= List of places in Merthyr Tydfil County Borough =

This is a list of places in the unitary authority of Merthyr Tydfil County Borough, Wales.

== Towns ==
- Merthyr Tydfil
- Treharris

== Communities ==
Local government communities:

- Bedlinog (with the only elected Community Council in the borough)
- Cyfarthfa
- Dowlais
- Gurnos
- Merthyr Vale
- Pant
- Park
- Penydarren
- Town
- Treharris
- Troed-y-rhiw
- Vaynor

== Electoral wards ==
- Bedlinog
- Cyfarthfa
- Dowlais
- Gurnos
- Merthyr Vale
- Park
- Penydarren
- Plymouth
- Town
- Treharris
- Vaynor

== See also ==
- Lists of places in Wales
