= List of electoral wards in Merthyr Tydfil County Borough =

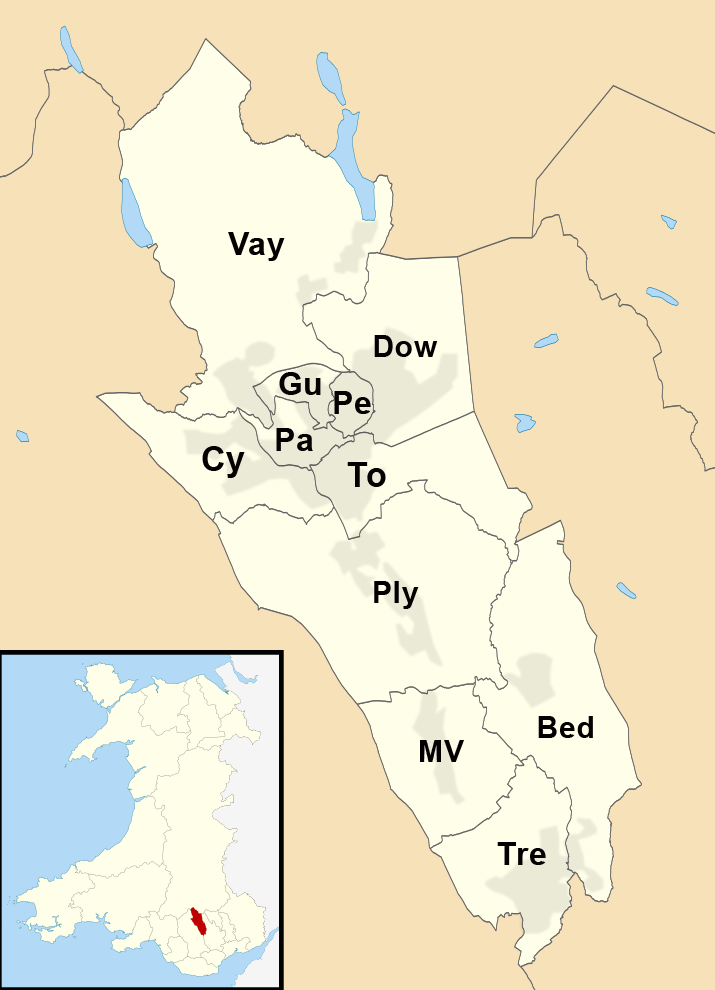
Locations of county wards in Merthyr Tydfil County Borough

This list of electoral wards in Merthyr Tydfil County Borough includes county borough electoral wards in Merthyr Tydfil County Borough, Wales. It also includes Community Council wards.

== County Borough Wards pre-1974 ==
Prior to 1 April 1974 the electoral wards to Merthyr Tydfil County Borough Council were Cyfarthfa, Dowlais, Park, Penydarren, Plymouth, Town and Treharris.

== County Borough Wards ==
The post-1996 county borough is divided into 11 electoral wards returning 33 councillors to Merthyr Tydfil County Borough Council. Most of these wards are coterminous with communities (parishes) of the same name. The following table lists council wards, numbers of councillors, associated communities and geographical areas:

Ward	County councillors	Communities	Settlements
Bedlinog ^{c}	2	Bedlinog	Bedlinog, Cwmfelin, Trelewis
Cyfarthfa ^{c}	3	Cyfarthfa	Clwydyfagwyr, Gelli-deg, Heolgerrig, Winch Fawr, Ynysfach
Dowlais	4	Dowlais; Pantyscallog	Dowlais, Dowlais Top, Caeharris, Caeracca, Pantyscallog, Rhydybedd, Tair Twynau
Gurnos ^{c}	4	Gurnos	Gurnos
Merthyr Vale ^{c}	2	Merthyr Vale	Aberfan, Mount Pleasant,
Park ^{c}	3	Park	Georgetown, The Quar
Penydarren ^{c}	3	Penydarren	Penydarren, Galon Uchaf
Plymouth	3	Troed-y-rhiw	Abercanaid, Pentrebach
Town ^{c}	4	Town	Merthyr Tydfil town centre, Twynyrodyn, Penyard
Treharris ^{c}	3	Treharris	Quakers Yard, Treharris, Pentwyn, Fiddler's Elbow, Edwardsville, Treharris
Vaynor ^{c}	2	Vaynor	Cefn Coed, Pontsticill, Trefechan, Vaynor

^{c} = Ward coterminous with community of the same name

== Community wards ==
Bedlinog is the only community in Merthyr Tydfil County Borough to elect a community council. For elections to Bedlinog Community Council, four community councillors are elected from a Bedlinog ward and five are elected from a Trelewis ward.

== See also ==
- List of electoral wards in Mid Glamorgan
- List of electoral wards in Wales
