= 2017 Merthyr Tydfil County Borough Council election =

2017 Welsh local government election

- 4 May 2017

All 33 seats to Merthyr Tydfil County Borough Council 17 seats needed for a majority
	First party	Second party	Third party
	Lab	Ind	Ind
Leader	Chris Barry	Kevin O'Neill	Paul Brown
Party	Labour	Independent	Merthyr Independents
Leader's seat	Park	Town	Cyfarthfa
Seats before	25	7	1
Seats won	15	17	1
Seat change	▼10	▲10	-
- Results of the 2017 Merthyr Tydfil County Borough Council election
Council control before election
Labour
Council control after election
Independent

The 2017 Merthyr Tydfil County Borough Council election took place on Thursday 4 May 2017 to elect the 33 members of Merthyr Tydfil County Borough Council in Wales. This was on the same day as other 2017 United Kingdom local elections. The Council shifted back from Labour to Independent control.

== Results ==
2017 Merthyr Tydfil Council Election
Party	Seats	Gains	Losses	Net gain/loss	Seats %	Votes %	Votes	+/−
Independent	17			+10				
Labour	15			-10				
Merthyr Independents	1			0				
Liberal Democrats	0			0	0.0			
Plaid Cymru	0			0	0.0			
UKIP	0			0	0.0			
Communist	0			0	0.0			
Conservative	0			0	0.0			

The outcome of the election wasn't decided until 8 June 2017, because the vote in the Cyfarthfa ward was delayed due to the death of a candidate. At the 4 May election the Independents overtook Labour as the largest group on the council, but were 1 seat short of a majority. They gained two of the three Cyfarthfa seats on 8 June to win control of the council. The former Labour leader of the council also lost his seat at the elections.

== Ward results ==
=== Bedlinog ===
Bedlinog ward (2 seats)
Party	Candidate	Votes	%	±%
Independent	Michael Colbran	727	65.8	
Independent	Sherelle Jago	718		
Labour	Helen Thomas	288	26.1	
Labour	Jeffrey Beard	284		
Liberal Democrats	Jasmine Sakura-Rose	90	8.1	
Majority				
Turnout				
Independent hold		Swing		
Independent hold		Swing		

=== Cyfarthfa ===
Cyfarthfa ward (3 seats)
Party	Candidate	Votes	%	±%
Independent	Geraint Thomas	1,369	30.0	
Merthyr Ind.	Paul Brown*	1,300	28.5	
Labour	David Chaplin*	1,202	26.4	
Labour	Margaret Davies*	1,137		
Labour	Carol Estebanez	1,072		
Merthyr Ind.	Terry Thomas	1,068	28.5	
Independent	Bleddyn Hancock	812		
Plaid Cymru	Mark Evans	685	15.0	
Majority				
Turnout			64.0	
Independent gain from Labour		Swing		
Merthyr Independent hold		Swing		
Labour hold		Swing		

The vote in the Cyfarthfa ward was delayed until 8 June because of the death of independent candidate, Ieuan Harris, during the campaign. The results gave the Independent group enough seats to have an overall majority on the council. The current mayor, Margaret Davies, who'd won her seat at a November 2012 by-election, lost her seat.

=== Dowlais ===
Dowlais ward (4 seats)
Party	Candidate	Votes	%	±%
Independent	Declan Salmon	1,122	64.0	
Independent	Tony Rogers	863		
Independent	David Hughes	762		
Independent	Julian Amos	777		
Labour	Phil Williams*	631	36.0	
Labour	Ray Thomas*	570		
Labour	Tom Lewis*	537		
Labour	Simon Williams	531		
Majority				
Turnout				
Independent gain from Labour		Swing		
Independent gain from Labour		Swing		
Independent gain from Labour		Swing		
Independent gain from Labour		Swing		

=== Gurnos ===
Gurnos ward (4 seats)
Party	Candidate	Votes	%	±%
Independent	Lee Davies	569	51.3	
Labour	Rhonda Braithwaite*	541	48.7	
Independent	Clive Tovey*	486		
Labour	Bill Smith*	479		
Labour	Deborah Isaac	423		
Labour	Mike O'Neill	421		
Independent	Mikey Mochan	402		
Independent	Gerwyn Butler	368		
Turnout				
Independent gain from Labour		Swing		
Labour hold		Swing		
Independent hold		Swing		
Labour hold		Swing		

=== Merthyr Vale ===
Merthyr Vale ward (2 seats)
Party	Candidate	Votes	%	±%
Labour	Darren Roberts*	698	61.1	
Labour	Scott Thomas	509		
Independent	Jeff Edwards	445	38.9	
Independent	Lynne Colston	266		
Majority				
Turnout				
Labour hold		Swing		
Labour hold		Swing		

=== Park ===
Park ward (3 seats)
Party	Candidate	Votes	%	±%
Independent	Tanya Skinner	802	51.0	
Labour	Clive Jones*	772	49.0	
Labour	Chris Barry*	689		
Labour	B. Toomey*	667		
Majority				
Turnout				
Independent gain from Labour		Swing		
Labour hold		Swing		
Labour hold		Swing		

=== Penydarren ===
Penydarren ward (3 seats)
Party	Candidate	Votes	%	±%
Independent	Kevin Gibbs	656	50.3	
Independent	Chris Davies	649		
Labour	David Issac*	647	49.7	
Independent	Dougy Evans	515		
Labour	John McCarthy	467		
Labour	Dan Beard	463		
Turnout				
Independent hold		Swing		
Independent gain from UKIP		Swing		
Labour hold		Swing		

=== Vaynor ===
Vaynor ward (2 seats)
Party	Candidate	Votes	%	±%
Independent	Howard Barrett*	948	66.7	
Independent	Lisa Mytton*	923		
Labour	Anthony Owen	474	33.3	
Labour	Emma Karan	371		
Turnout			44.2	
Independent hold		Swing		
Independent hold		Swing		

* = sitting councillor in this ward prior to election
