= 2012 Merthyr Tydfil County Borough Council election =

2012 Welsh local government election

- 3 May 2012

All 33 seats to Merthyr Tydfil County Borough Council 17 seats needed for a majority
	First party	Second party	Third party
	Lab	Ind	UKI
Leader	Brendan Toomey	Jeff Edwards	Jock Greer
Party	Labour	Independent	UKIP
Leader's seat	Park	Merthyr Vale (lost)	Penydarren
Seats before	8	19	0
Seats won	23	9	1
Seat change	▲15	▼10	▲1
Popular vote	N/A	N/A	588
Percentage	N/A	N/A	N/A
	Fourth party
	Lib
Leader	N/A
Party	Liberal Democrats
Leader's seat	N/A
Seats before	6
Seats won	0
Seat change	▼6
Popular vote	N/A
Percentage	N/A
- Results of the 2012 Merthyr Tydfil County Borough Council election

The 2012 Merthyr Tydfil County Borough Council election took place on 3 May 2012 to elect members of Merthyr Tydfil County Borough Council in Wales. This was on the same day as other 2012 United Kingdom local elections. The Council shifted from Independent to Labour.

== Results ==
2012 Merthyr Tydfil Borough Council Election
Party	Seats	Gains	Losses	Net gain/loss	Seats %	Votes %	Votes	+/−
Labour	23			+15	69.7	45.5	8,145	+12.5
Independent	7			-9	21.2	35.4	6,343	-7.0
Liberal Democrats	0			-6	0.0	5.1	910	-10.9
Merthyr Independents	2			-1	6.1	4.4	797	-1.1
Plaid Cymru	0			0	0.0	3.9	703	+1.2
UKIP	1			+1	3.0	3.3	588	New
Communist	0			0	0.0	2.1	383	+1.7
Conservative	0			0	0.0	0.3	50	New

The Liberal Democrats lost all the gains they had made in 2008. The Independent coalition council leader also lost his seat.

== Ward results ==
=== Bedlinog ===
Bedlinog ward (2 seats)
Party	Candidate	Votes	%	±%
Independent	L. Smart*	534	54.8	
Independent	G. Jones*	517		
Labour	O. Thomas	292	30.0	
Labour	D. Thomas	224		
Liberal Democrats	B. Setters	92	9.4	
Communist	C. Ashton	56	5.7	
Liberal Democrats	J. Pappas	33		
Majority				
Turnout			37.1	
Independent hold		Swing		
Independent hold		Swing		

=== Cyfarthfa ===
Cyfarthfa ward (3 seats)
Party	Candidate	Votes	%	±%
Independent	L. Elliott*	797	44.3	
Independent	P. Brown*	760		
Labour	T. Chaplin	683	38.0	
Independent	M. Jenkins	655		
Labour	M. Davies	640		
Labour	D. Chaplin	601		
Plaid Cymru	M. Evans	318	17.7	
Majority				
Turnout			33.1	
Independent hold		Swing		
Independent hold		Swing		
Labour gain from Independent		Swing		

=== Dowlais ===
Dowlais ward (4 seats)
Party	Candidate	Votes	%	±%
Labour	P. Williams*	971	58.0	
Labour	R. Thomas*	948		
Labour	P. Williams	863		
Labour	T. Lewis	806		
Independent	T. Rogers*	703	42.0	
Independent	J. Amos*	591		
Majority				
Turnout			33.1	
Labour hold		Swing		
Labour hold		Swing		
Labour gain from Independent		Swing		
Labour gain from Independent		Swing		

=== Gurnos ===
Gurnos ward (4 seats)
Party	Candidate	Votes	%	±%
Labour	R. Braithwaite	591	54.2	
Labour	B. Smith*	586		
Independent	C. Tovey*	500	45.8	
Labour	D. Jarrett	496		
Labour	S. Bevan	492		
Independent	R. Llewellyn	419		
Independent	G. Canavan	417		
Independent	A. Brown*	408		
Turnout			33.2	
Labour hold		Swing		
Labour hold		Swing		
Independent hold		Swing		
Labour gain from Independent		Swing		

=== Merthyr Vale ===
Merthyr Vale ward (2 seats)
Party	Candidate	Votes	%	±%
Labour	B. Mansbridge*	905	63.7	
Labour	D. Roberts	770		
Independent	Jeff Edwards*	516	36.3	
Majority				
Turnout			46.2	
Labour hold		Swing		
Labour gain from Independent		Swing		

Independent coalition leader of the council, Jeff Edwards, lost his seat at this election.

=== Park ===
Park ward (3 seats)
Party	Candidate	Votes	%	±%
Labour	B. Toomey*	913	63.2	
Labour	C. Jones*	888		
Labour	C. Barry*	822		
Independent	S. Davies	532	36.8	
Independent	G. Price	482		
Majority				
Turnout			41.1	
Labour hold		Swing		
Labour hold		Swing		
Labour hold		Swing		

=== Penydarren ===
Penydarren ward (3 seats)
Party	Candidate	Votes	%	±%
Independent	A. Jones*	656	36.2	
UKIP	Jock Greer*	588	32.4	
Labour	D. Issac	569	31.4	
Independent	C. Barsi	438		
Labour	J. McCarthy	435		
Labour	J. Johal	337		
Independent	K. Baker	315		
Independent	M. Regan	230		
Turnout			36.2	
Independent hold		Swing		
UKIP gain from Independent		Swing		
Labour gain from Independent		Swing		

=== Plymouth ===
Plymouth ward (3 seats)
Party	Candidate	Votes	%	±%
Labour	H. Jones	949	47.8	
Labour	B. Carter*	830		
Labour	G. Lewis	803		
Independent	D. Games*	738	37.2	
Independent	P. Watkins	523		
Independent	S. Thomas	414		
Liberal Democrats	K. O'Connor*	247	12.4	
Liberal Democrats	A. Sims	117		
Liberal Democrats	C. Lambourne	112		
Conservative	H. Kumar	50	2.5	
Turnout			44.1	
Labour gain from Liberal Democrats		Swing		
Labour gain from Liberal Democrats		Swing		
Labour gain from Independent		Swing		

=== Town ===
Town ward (4 seats)
Party	Candidate	Votes	%	±%
Labour	D. Jones	1,192	41.6	
Labour	D. Davies	986		
Labour	G. Davies	926		
Labour	L. Matthews	907		
Liberal Democrats	A. Kitcher*	571	19.9	
Independent	I. Clark	458	16.0	
Plaid Cymru	V. Pugh	385	13.4	
Liberal Democrats	B. Griffin*	363		
Plaid Cymru	D. Griffiths	356		
Liberal Democrats	A. Austin	324		
Independent	M. Thomas	323		
Independent	S. Taylor	316		
Independent	G. Powles	305		
Liberal Democrats	L. Heritage	271		
Communist	T. Roberts	261	9.1	
Turnout			38.8	
Labour gain from Liberal Democrats		Swing		
Labour gain from Liberal Democrats		Swing		
Labour gain from Liberal Democrats		Swing		
Labour gain from Liberal Democrats		Swing		

=== Treharris ===
Treharris ward (3 seats)
Party	Candidate	Votes	%	±%
Labour	K. Moran	829	50.2	
Independent	R. Thomas*	821	49.8	
Labour	E. Galsworthy	808		
Labour	G. Watkins	782		
Independent	G. Price*	611		
Independent	P. Smithers*	583		
Turnout			44.1	
Independent hold		Swing		
Labour gain from Independent		Swing		
Labour gain from Independent		Swing		

=== Vaynor ===
Vaynor ward (2 seats)
Party	Candidate	Votes	%	±%
Independent	L. Mytton*	885	73.6	
Independent	H. Barrett*	883		
Labour	T. Reid	251	20.9	
Labour	A. Barry	222		
Communist	R. Evans	66	5.5	
Turnout			44.2	
Independent hold		Swing		
Independent hold		Swing		
