= 2027 Merthyr Tydfil County Borough Council election =

2027 Welsh local government election

- 6 May 2027

All 30 seats to Merthyr Tydfil County Borough Council 16 seats needed for a majority
| | First party | Second party |
|---|---|---|
| | Labour | Independent |
| Leader | Brent Carter | Geraint Thomas |
| Party | Welsh Labour | Independent |
| Leader's seat | Plymouth | Cyfarthfa |
| Seats before | 15 | 15 |

The 2027 Merthyr Tydfil County Borough Council election will take place on 6 May 2027 to elect all 30 councillors across 11 wards to Merthyr Tydfil County Borough Council in Wales, as a part of both the 2027 Welsh local elections, and the 2027 United Kingdom local elections.

== Background ==
In 2022, the independent administration lost its majority and tied with Welsh Labour at 15 seats each. The independents continued to run the council as a minority administration.

In October 2023, councillor Jeremy Scriven resigned from Welsh Labour over the party's Middle East policy.

On 7 March 2024, councillor Kevin Gibbs announced his resignation from Welsh Labour via a Facebook post, citing concerns over Keir Starmer's leadership and his role in the United Kingdom's support for Israel during the Gaza war.

On 5 September 2024, following the resignation of independent councillor Malcolm Colbran, Welsh Labour's Gillian Preston won the Bedlinog & Trelewis by-election. This resulted in the resignation of Geraint Thomas as leader of the council.

On 18 September 2024, Welsh Labour's Brent Carter became leader of the council, officially granting Labour back its control of the council.

On 9 June 2025, during a speech in Port Talbot, Nigel Farage announced that independent councillors Andrew Barry and David Hughes had joined Reform UK.

On 25 March 2026, Andrew Barry resigned from Reform UK following the selection of Torfaen councillor, Jason O'Connell, as the party's top candidate for Pontypridd Cynon Merthyr in the 2026 Senedd election, claiming that the party was "parachuting" candidates into the constituency.

Following the 2026 Senedd election, Reform UK councillor David Hughes resigned as a councillor to become a Member of the Senedd for Pontypridd Cynon Merthyr. The following by-election for Hughes' ward, Dowlais & Pant, was held on 25 June 2026 and was won by Welsh Labour's Dean Barrett.
