= 2022 Welsh local elections =

- 5 May 2022

All 1,231 seats to 22 Welsh councils
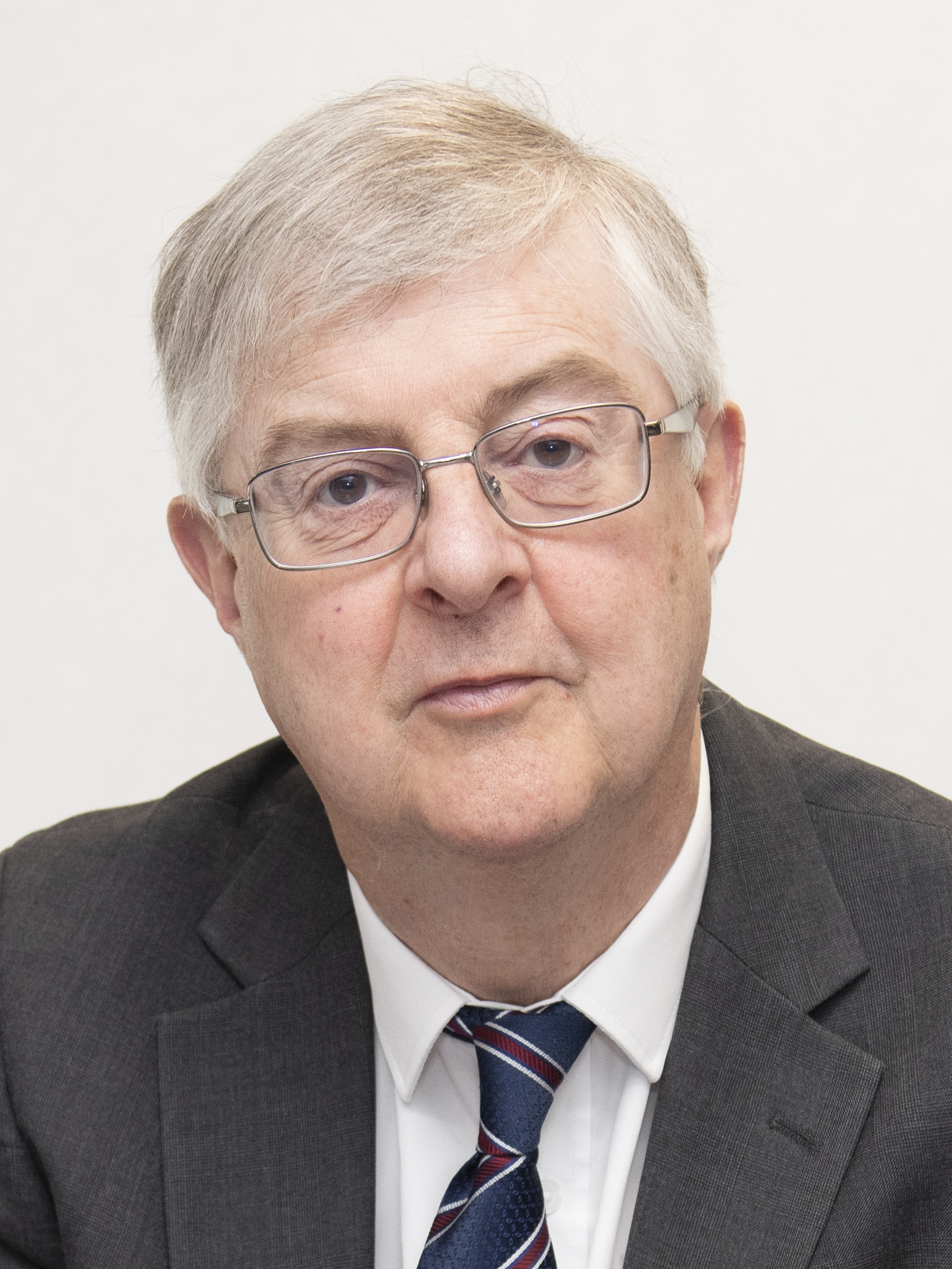

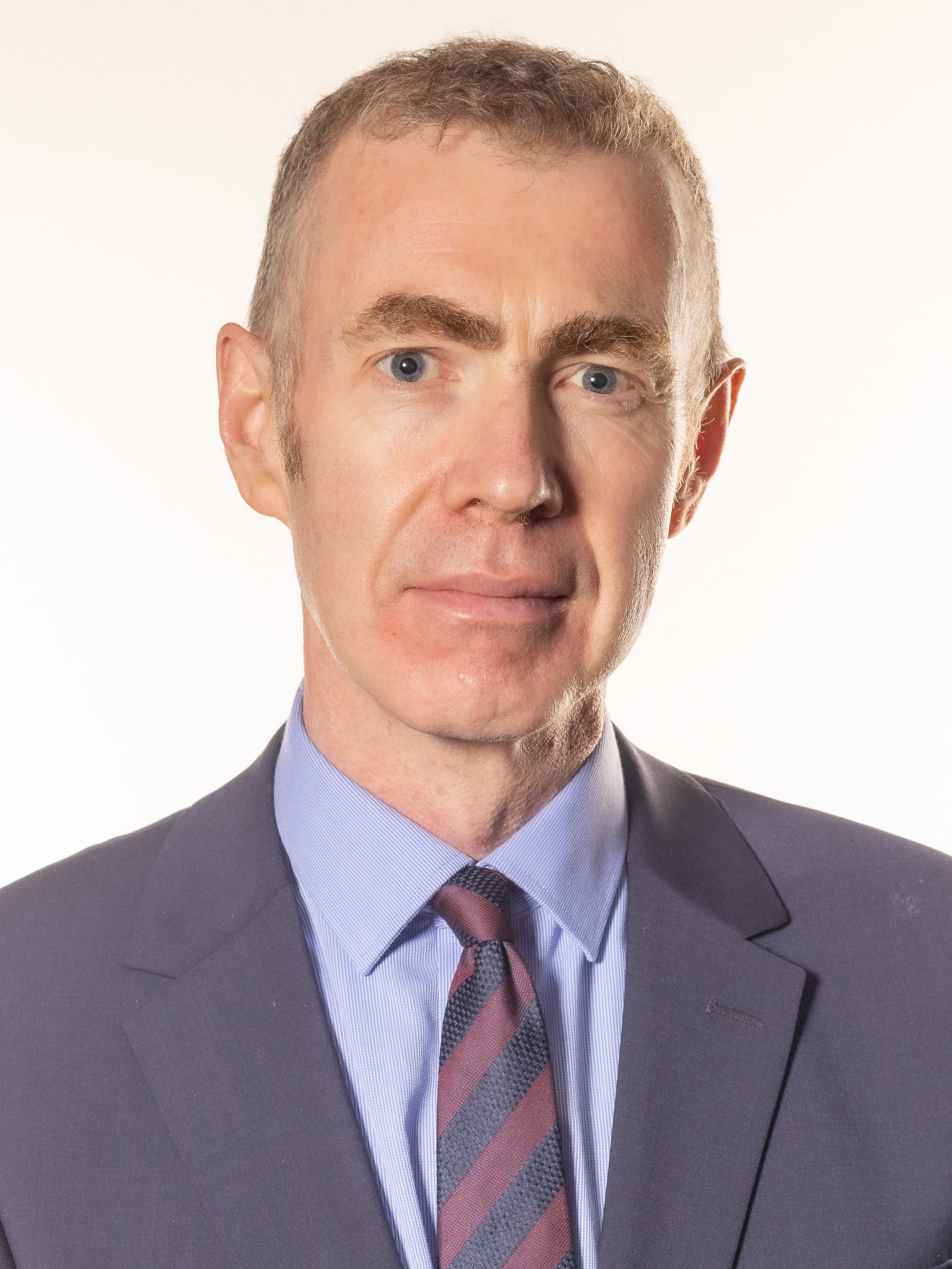

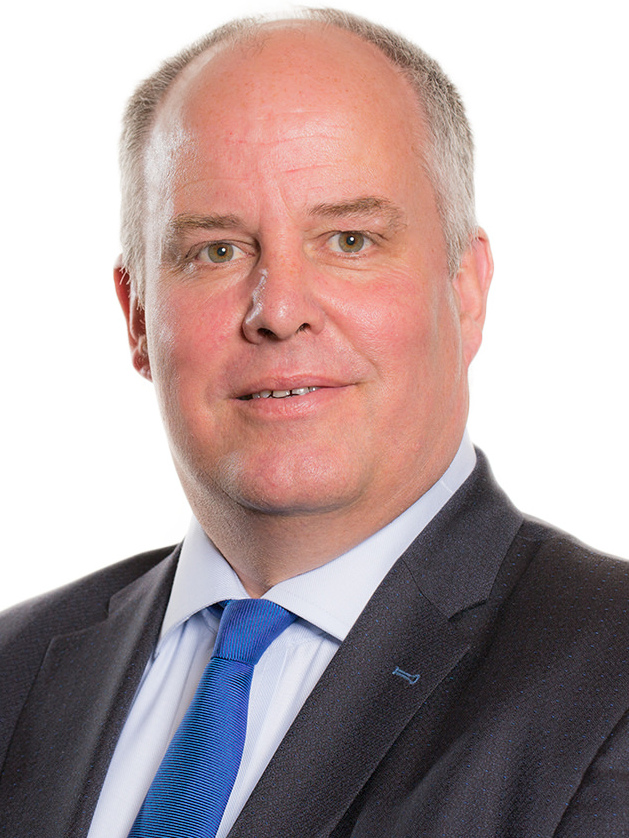

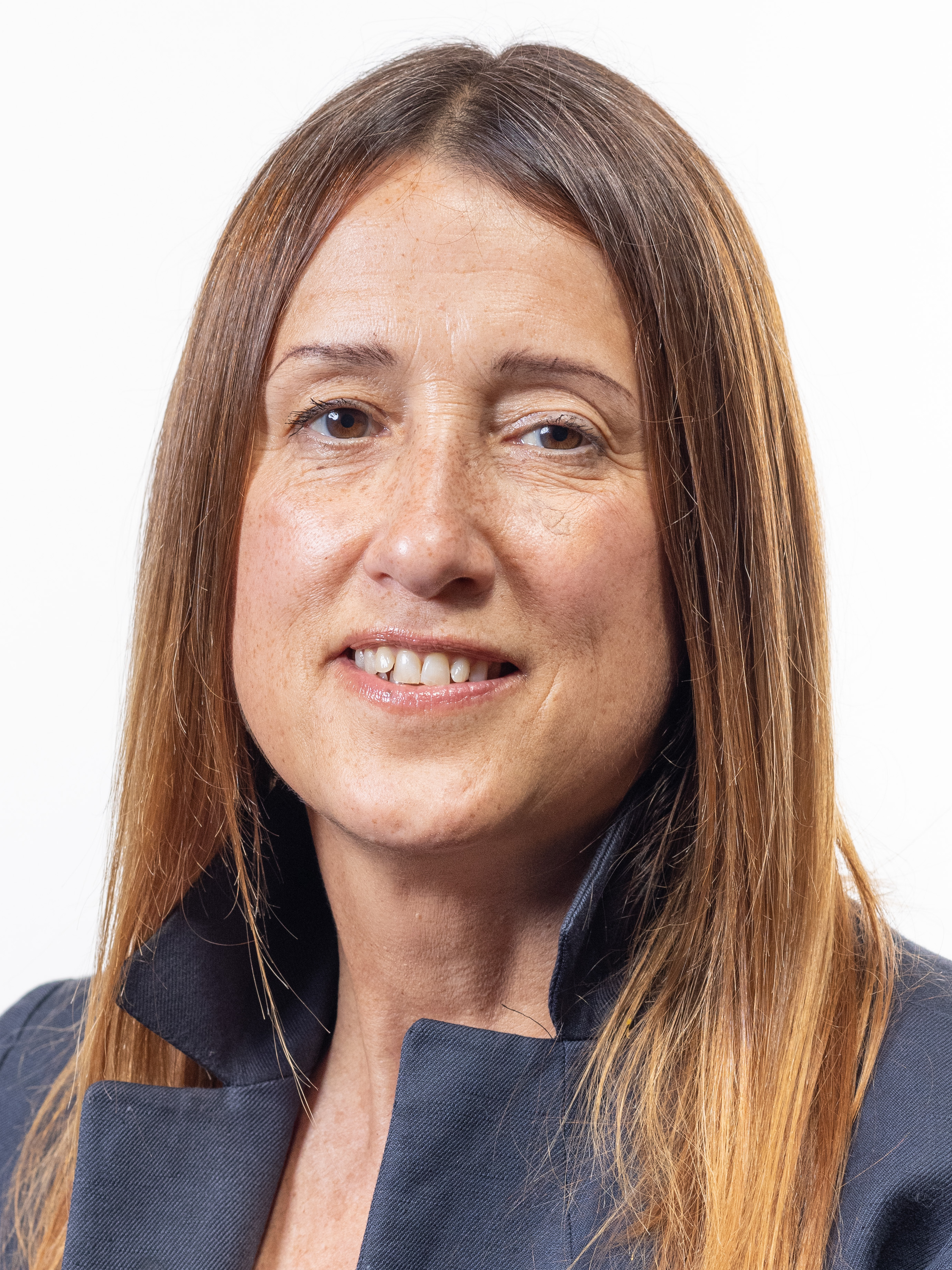

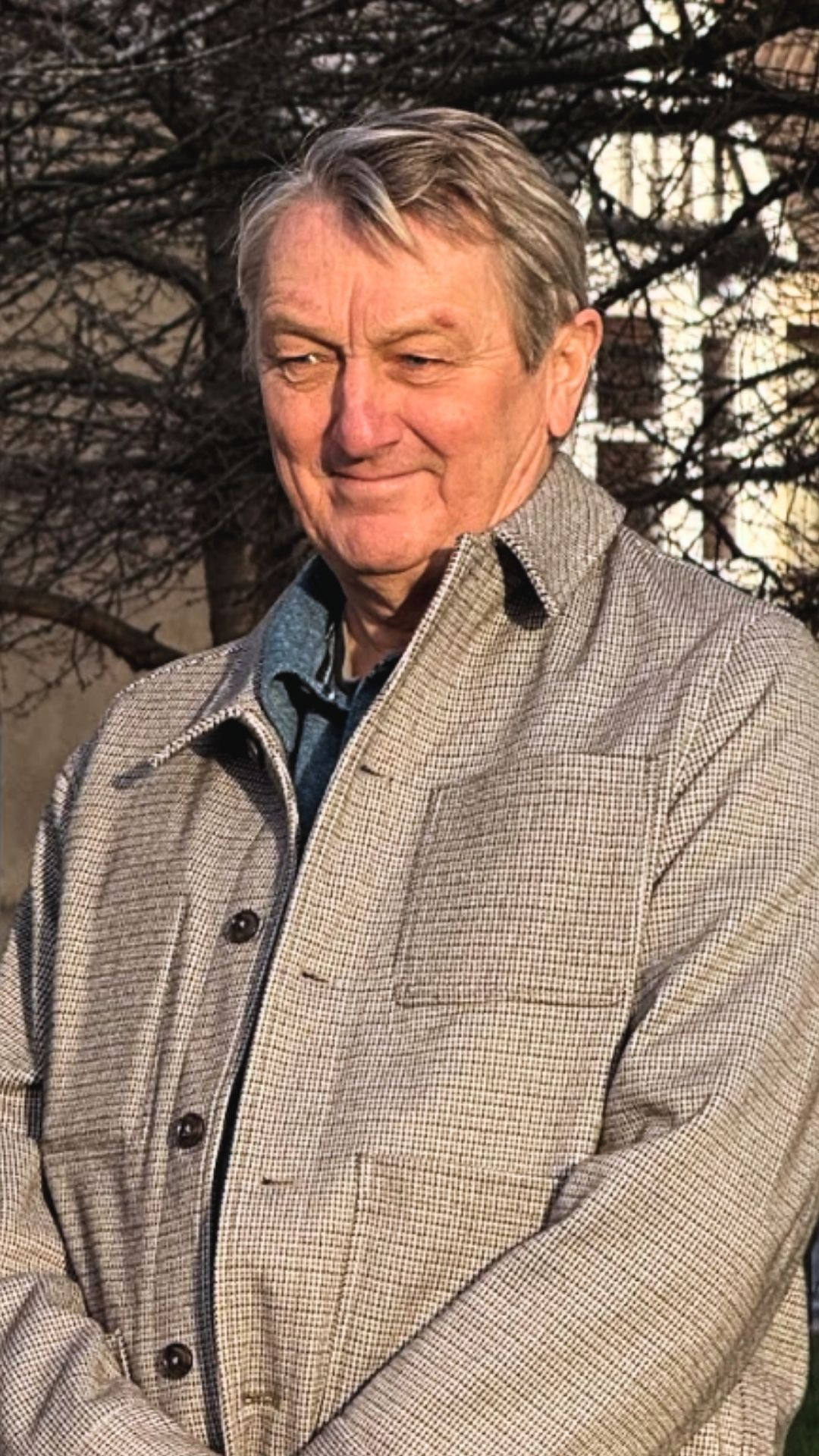
	First party	Second party	Third party
Leader	Mark Drakeford	None	Adam Price
Party	Labour	Independent	Plaid Cymru
Leader since	6 December 2018		28 September 2018
Last election	468 seats, 30.4% 7 councils	309 seats, 22.5% 3 councils	208 seats, 16.5% 1 council
Seats won	526; 8 councils	307; 0 councils	202; 4 councils
Seat change	▲66 ▲1 council	▼2 ▼3 councils	▼6 ▲3 councils
Popular vote	323,075	206,703	160,284
Percentage	34%	21.76%	16.9%
Swing	▲3.6%	▼0.74%	▲0.4%
	Fourth party	Fifth party	Sixth party
Leader	Andrew RT Davies	Jane Dodds	Anthony Slaughter
Party	Conservative	Liberal Democrats	Green
Leader since	24 January 2021	3 November 2017	December 2018
Last election	184 seats, 18.8% 1 councils	63 seats, 6.8% 0 councils	1 seat, 1.3% 0 councils
Seats won	111; 0 councils	69; 0 councils	8; 0 councils
Seat change	▼86 ▼1 council	▲10	▲7
Popular vote	145,115	66,180	21,585
Percentage	15.3%	6.97%	2.27%
Swing	▼3.52%	▲0.17%	▲0.97%
Colours denote the winning party with outright control (left), and the largest party by ward (right)
Key:
Labour
Independent
Plaid Cymru
Conservative
No overall control

Local elections in Wales were held on 5 May 2022 to elect members to the twenty-two local authorities. They were held alongside other local elections in the United Kingdom. The previous elections were held in 2017.

The Welsh Conservatives lost over a third of their seats and their majority on Monmouthshire County Council. Plaid Cymru won outright control of four councils, which was the highest number in the party's history, however their overall number of councillors elected decreased.

== Background ==
In the local elections in 2017, 1,271 seats were elected. Welsh Labour won 468 seats, independent candidates won 309 seats, Plaid Cymru won 208 seats, the Welsh Conservatives won 184 seats, and the Welsh Liberal Democrats won 63 seats. Other parties including the Wales Green Party won 22 seats. The 2022 Welsh local elections were initially scheduled for 2021, to give councillors a four-year term, but they were delayed to 2022 to avoid clashing with the 2021 Senedd election. The 2021 Local Government and Elections (Wales) Act permanently changed the term length for councillors from four years to five years.

Ahead of the 2022 elections, eleven of the twenty-two councils in Wales were under no overall control with no single party holding more than half of the seats. Labour controlled seven councils, Independents controlled two councils, and the Conservatives and Plaid Cymru each controlled one council.

== Process ==
To have been able to vote in the 2022 local elections in Wales a person must be aged 16 or over on the day of the election (also called "polling day"), have been registered to vote by the morning of the 14 April 2022, registered at an address in Wales, and not be legally excluded from voting. The deadline for applications to vote by post was 19 April 2022, of which a request must have been put in writing. Persons wishing to vote must also be one of the following:

- a British citizen
- an Irish or EU citizen
- a qualifying Commonwealth citizen
- a citizen of another country living in Scotland or Wales who has permission to enter or stay in the UK, or who does not need permission

For this election, councils in Wales use first-past-the-post voting (FPTP) in single-member wards and block voting in multi-member wards. For the next election in 2027, councils will choose whether to conduct elections under FPTP or the single transferable vote, due to changes in legislation in Wales.

== Principal councils ==
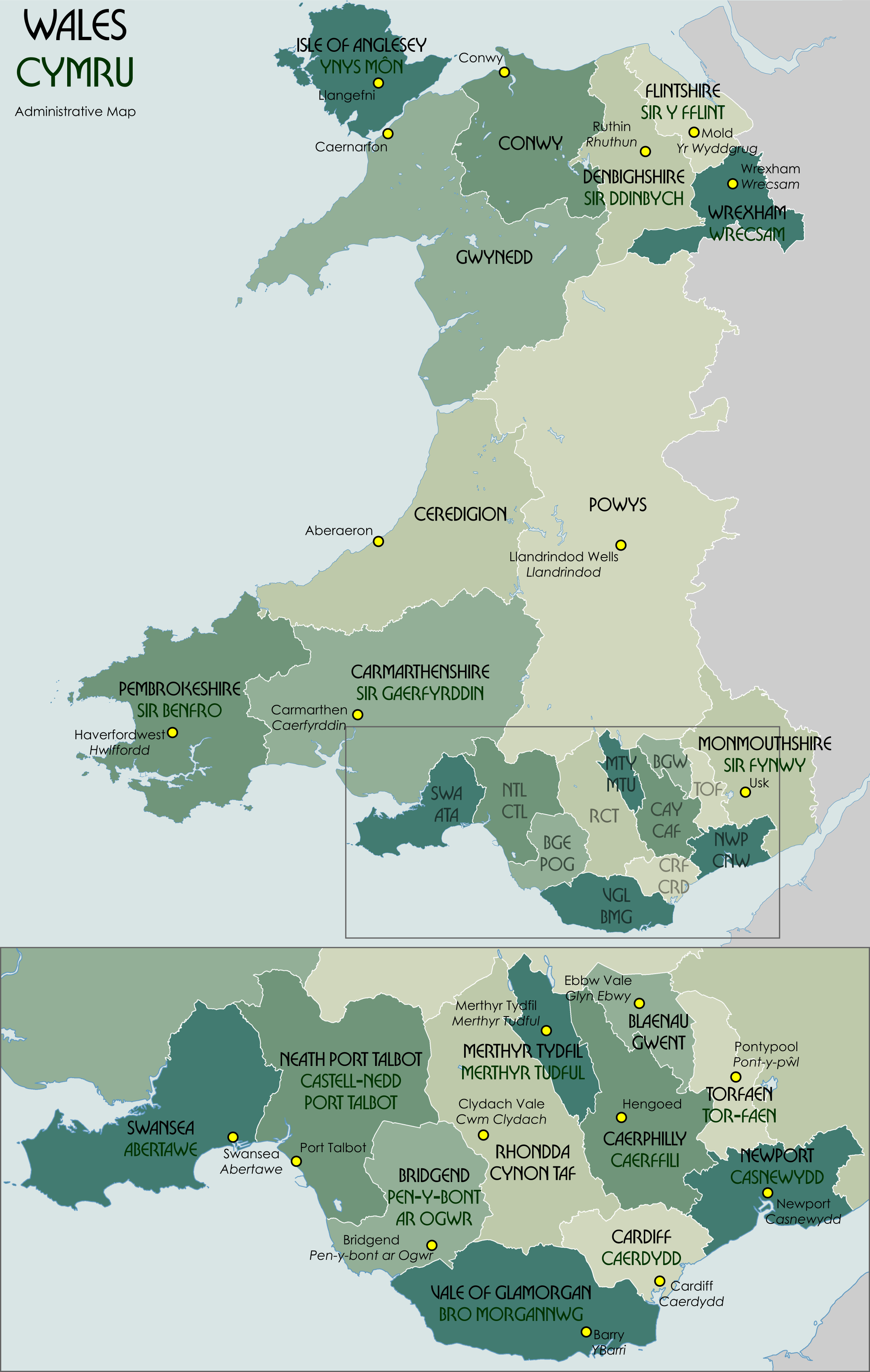

Elections were held for all councillors in all 22 local authorities, all of which were conducted under new boundaries. These boundary changes mean a number of seats have been redrawn and the total number of councillors in Wales will fall from 1,254 to 1,233, a decrease of 21.

Council	Seats		
Council	New	Prior	Difference
Anglesey	35	30	+5
Blaenau Gwent	33	42	–9
Bridgend	51	54	–3
Caerphilly	69	73	–4
Cardiff	79	75	+4
Carmarthenshire	75	74	+1
Ceredigion	38	42	–4
Conwy	55	59	–4
Denbighshire	48	47	+1
Flintshire	66	70	–4
Gwynedd	69	75	–6
Merthyr Tydfil	30	33	–3
Monmouthshire	46	43	+2
Neath Port Talbot	60	64	–4
Newport	51	50	+1
Pembrokeshire	60	60	0
Powys	68	73	–5
Rhondda Cynon Taf	75	75	0
Swansea	75	72	+3
Torfaen	40	44	–4
Vale of Glamorgan	54	47	+7
Wrexham	56	52	+4
Totals	1,233	1,254	–21

== Candidates ==
2,436 candidates sought election to 1,231 seats.

Candidates
Party	#	Difference from 2017
Labour	863	–47
Independent	683	–187
Conservative	669	–48
Plaid Cymru	526	–23
Liberal Democrats	284	+4
Green	115	+37
Propel	47	
TUSC	24	
Freedom Alliance	10	
Reform	4	
Breakthrough Party	1	
SDP	1	
Heritage	1	
Women's Equality	1	
Localist	18	
Other	53	

1.Plaid Cymru figures include Plaid Cymru and Green Party Common Ground Alliance candidates in Cardiff.

=== Councils ===
Council	Seats	Party control		Details
Council	Seats	Previous	New	Details
Anglesey	35	No overall control (Plaid Cymru/independent coalition)	Plaid Cymru	Details
Blaenau Gwent	33	Independent	Labour	Details
Bridgend	51	No overall control (Labour minority)	Labour	Details
Caerphilly	69	Labour	Labour	Details
Cardiff	79	Labour	Labour	Details
Carmarthenshire	75	No overall control (Plaid Cymru/independent coalition)	Plaid Cymru	Details
Ceredigion	38	No overall control (Plaid Cymru/independent coalition)	Plaid Cymru	Details
Conwy	55	No overall control (Conservative/independent coalition)	No overall control	Details
Denbighshire	48	No overall control (Conservative/independent coalition)	No overall control	Details
Flintshire	66	No overall control (Labour minority)	No overall control	Details
Gwynedd	69	Plaid Cymru	Plaid Cymru	Details
Merthyr Tydfil	30	Independent	No overall control	Details
Monmouthshire	46	Conservative	No overall control	Details
Neath Port Talbot	60	Labour	No overall control	Details
Newport	51	Labour	Labour	Details
Pembrokeshire	60	No overall control (independent/Labour/Plaid Cymru/Lib Dem coalition)	No overall control	Details
Powys	68	No overall control (independent/Conservative coalition)	No overall control	Details
Rhondda Cynon Taf	75	Labour	Labour	Details
Swansea	75	Labour	Labour	Details
Torfaen	40	Labour	Labour	Details
Vale of Glamorgan	54	No overall control (Labour/independent coalition)	No overall control	Details
Wrexham	56	No overall control (independent/Conservative coalition)	No overall control	Details
All 22 councils	1,233			

== Results ==
Party	Votes	%	+/-	Councils	+/-	Seats	+/-
Labour	323,075	34%	▲3.6%	8	▲1	526	▲66
Independent	206,703	21.76%	▼0.74%	0	▼3	307	▼2
Plaid Cymru	160,284	16.87%	▲0.37%	4	▲3	202	▼6
Conservative	145,115	15.28%	▼3.52%	0	▼1	111	▼86
Liberal Democrats	66,180	6.97%	▲0.17%	0	Steady	69	▲10
Green	21,585	2.27%	▲0.97%	0	Steady	8	▲7
Other	26,939	2.84%	▲0.34%	0	Steady	9	▼12
No overall control	n/a	n/a	n/a	10	▼1	n/a	n/a
Post-election vacancy	n/a	n/a	n/a	n/a	n/a	2	n/a

The Conservatives lost 86 councillors and lost control of the one council which they administered, Monmouthshire. Though Plaid Cymru lost a small amount of councillors, they consolidated and gained three councils. The Liberal Democrats became the largest party in Powys council. The Wales Green Party gained 8 councillors across 7 councils. Propel gained one councillor in Cardiff.

Whilst Labour gained two councils and lost one, they gained 66 councillors across the country.

== Ward result maps ==
=== By council ===
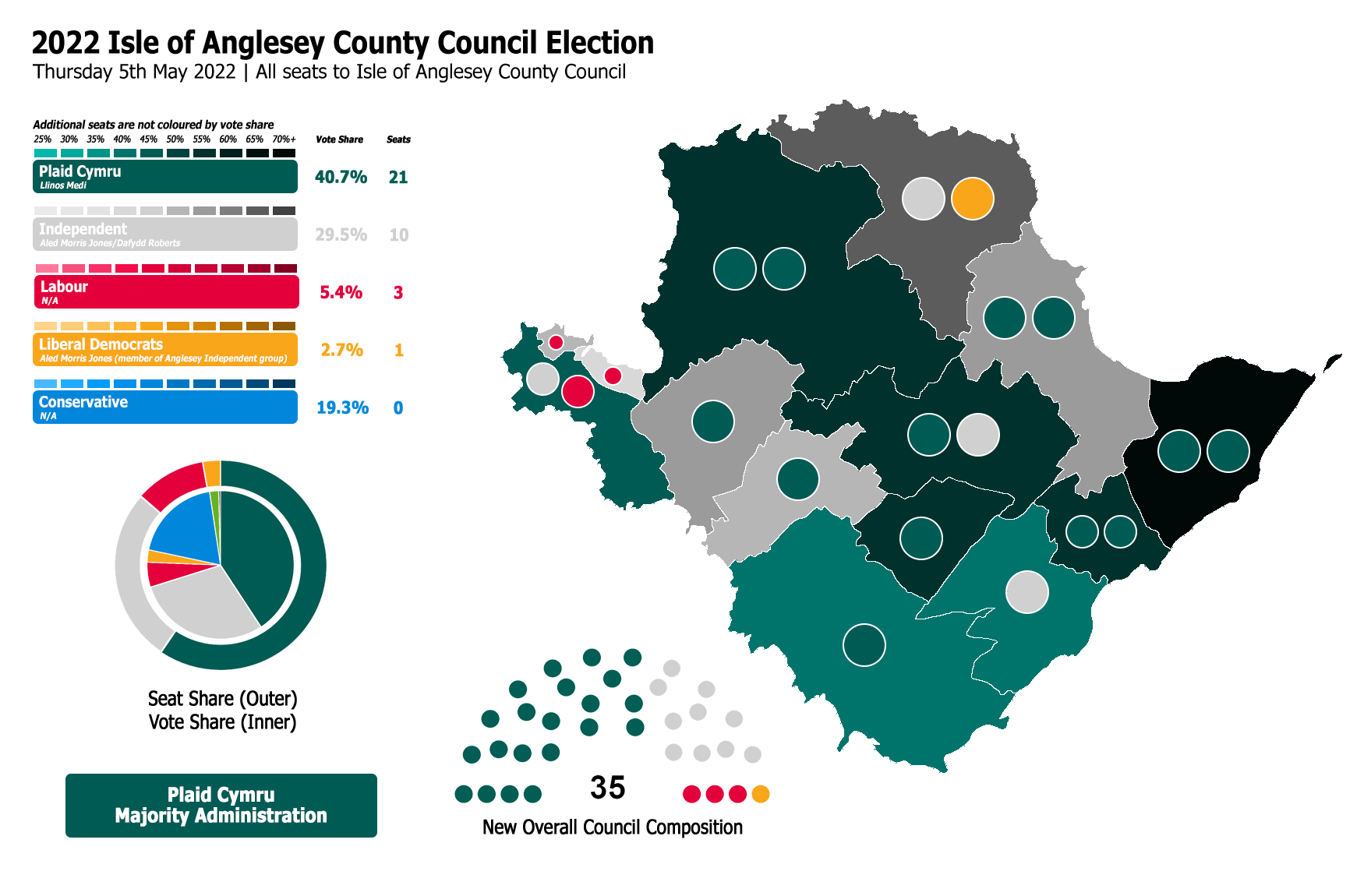
Anglesey 2022 result map

Cardiff 2022 result map

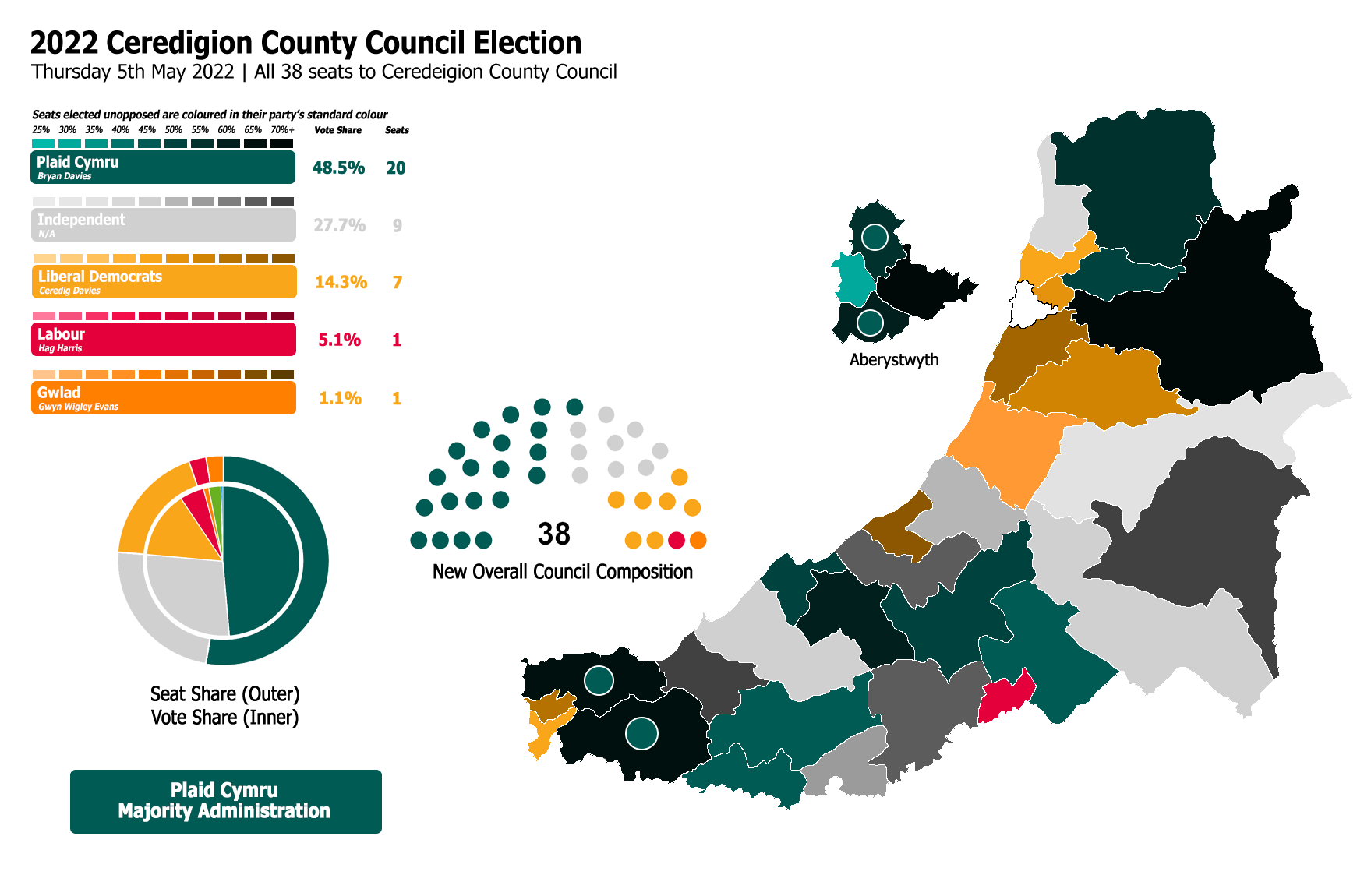
Ceredigion 2022 result map

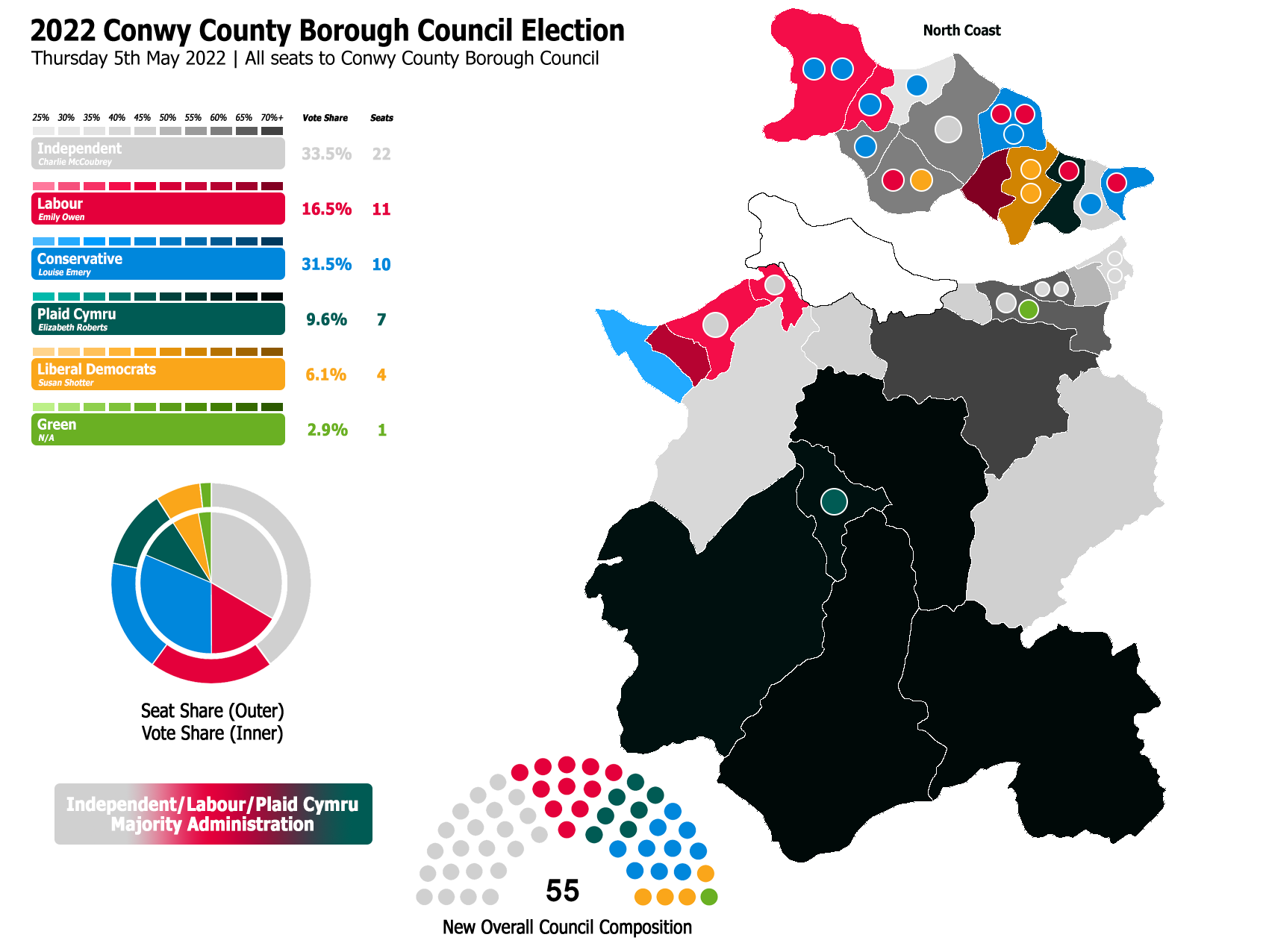
Conwy 2022 result map

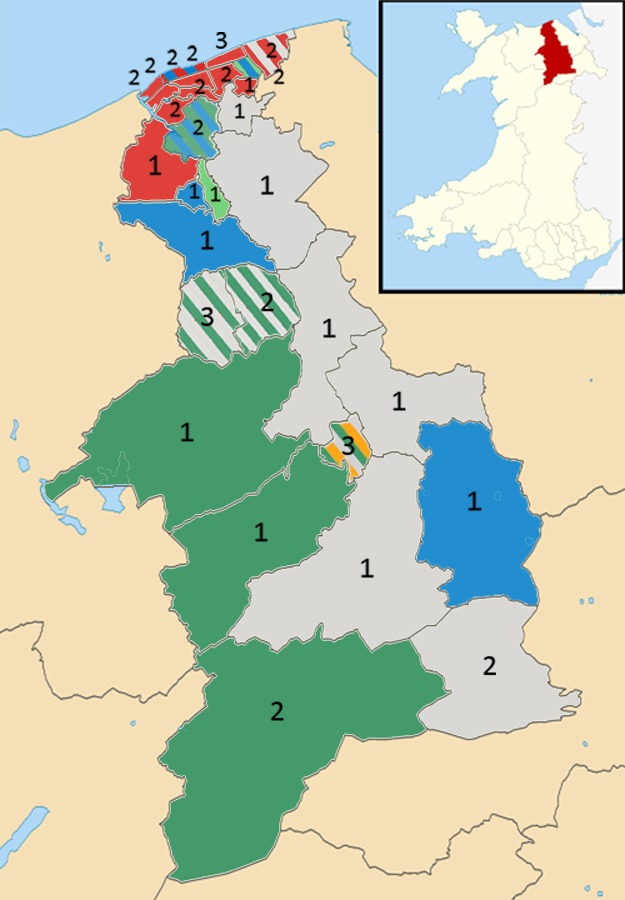
Denbighshire 2022 result map

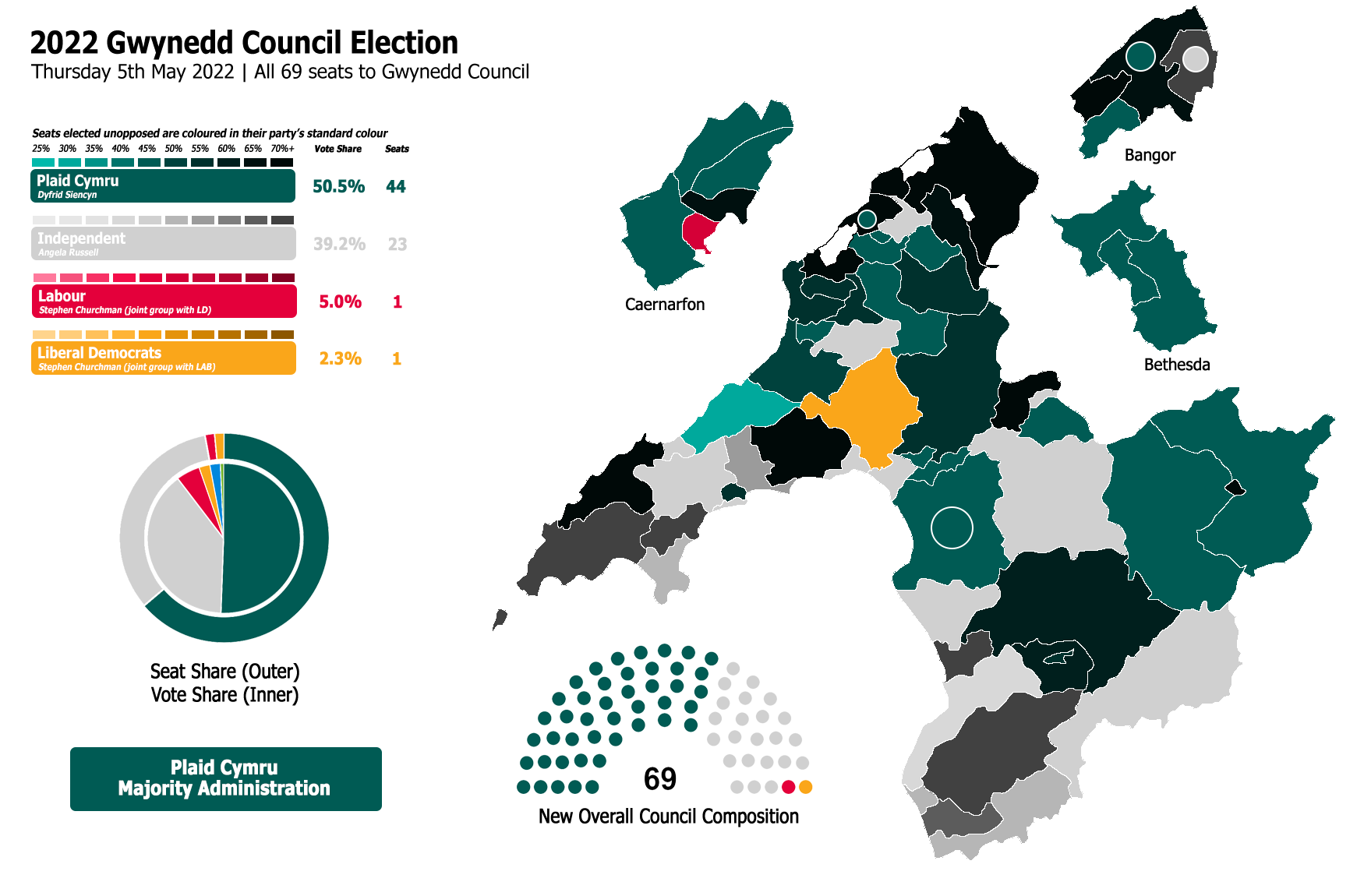
Gwynedd 2022 results map

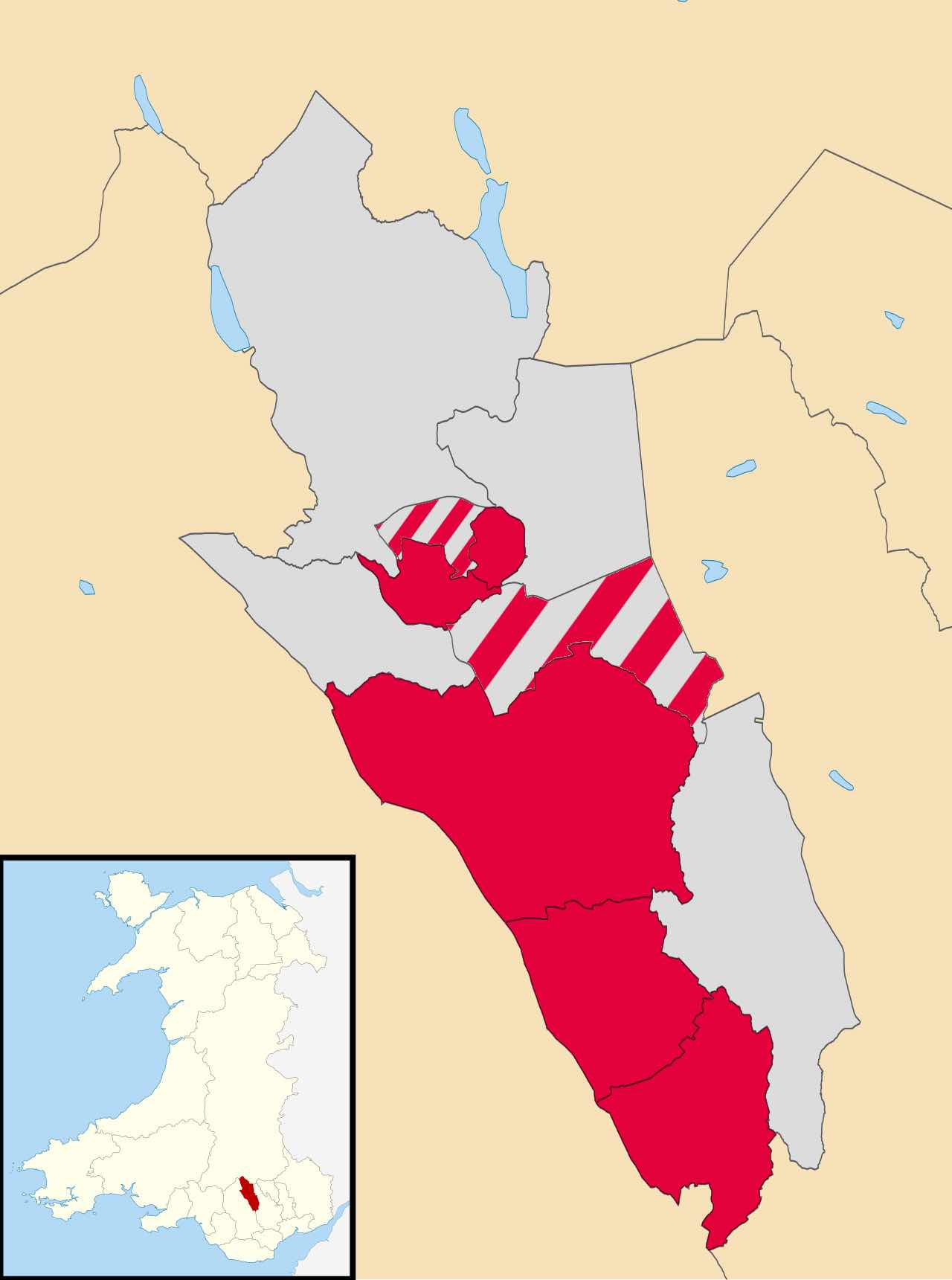
Merthyr Tydfil 2022 result map

Monmouthshire 2022 result map

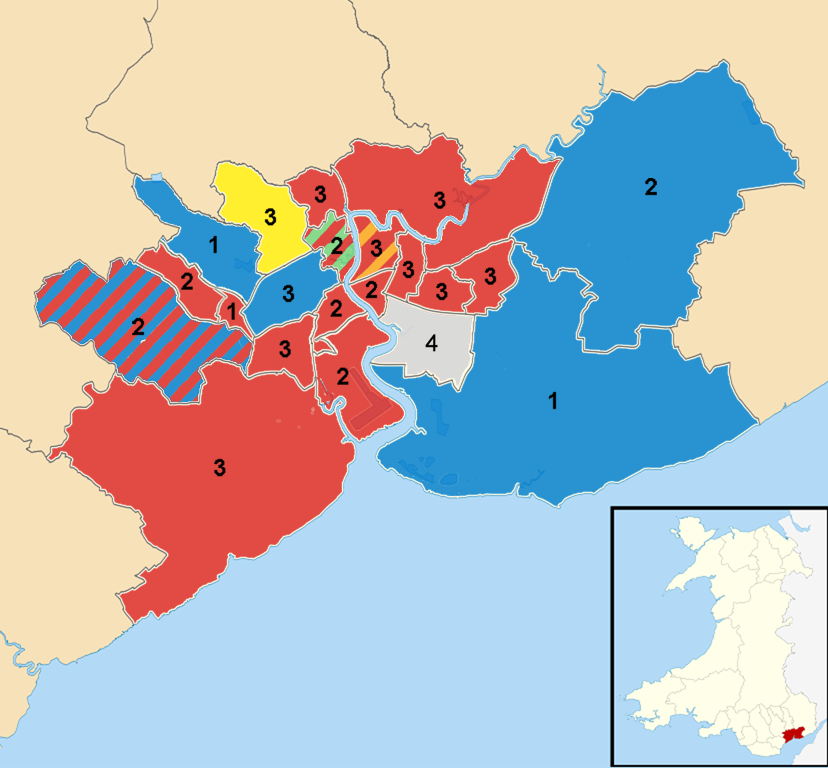
Newport 2022 result map

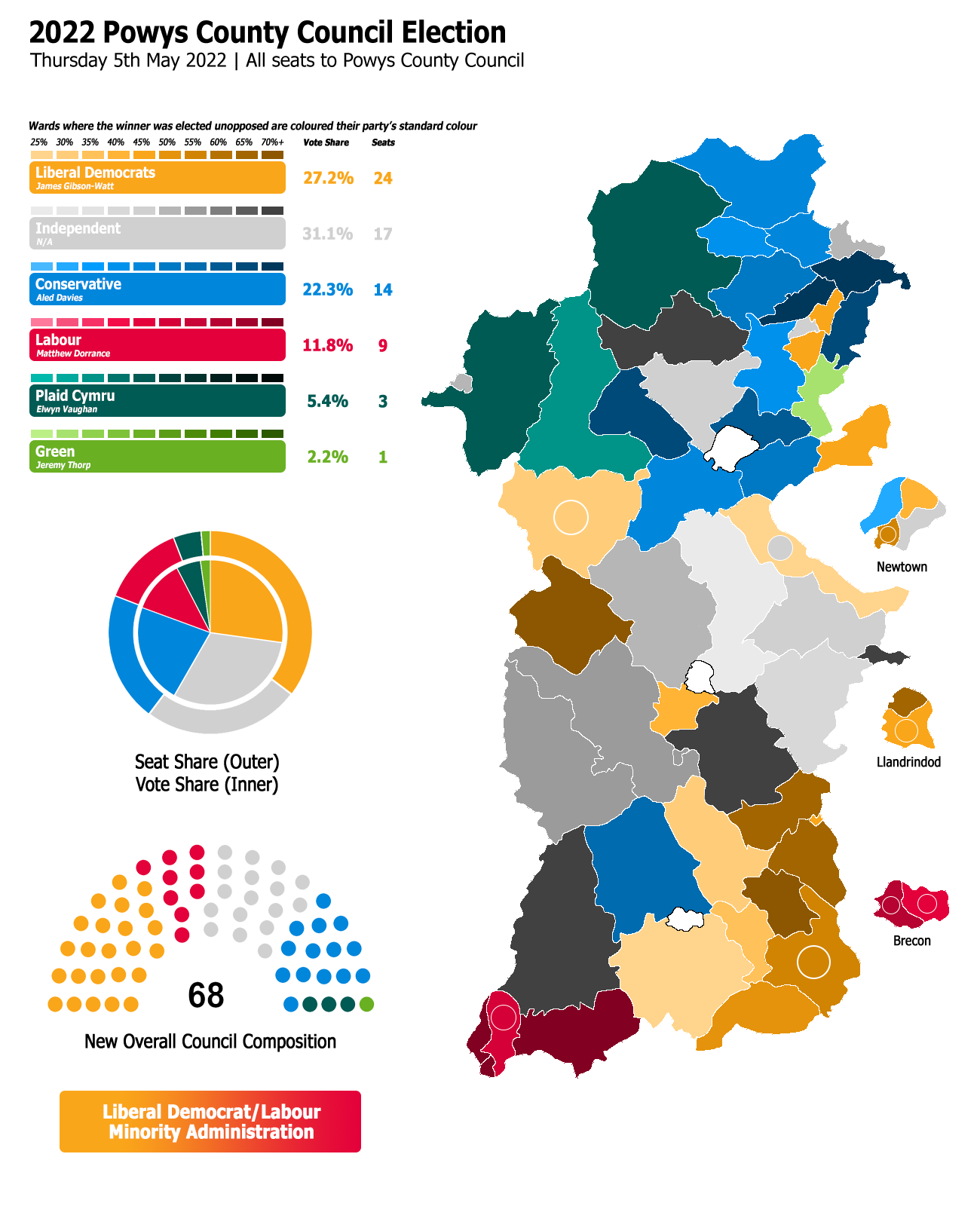
Powys 2022 result map

Swansea 2022 result map

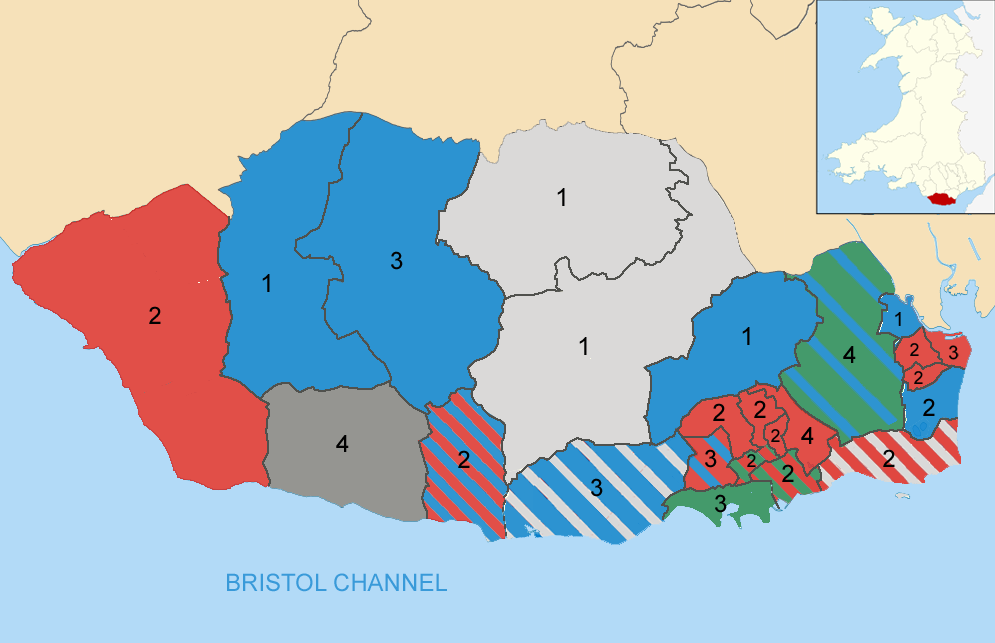
Vale of Glamorgan 2022 result map

Wrexham 2022 result map

== See also ==
- List of political parties in Wales
- Local government in Wales
- Politics of Wales
