= 2008 Merthyr Tydfil County Borough Council election =

2008 Welsh local government election

Results of the 2008 Merthyr Tydfil County Borough Council election

The 2008 Merthyr Tydfil County Borough Council election took place on 1 May 2008 to elect members of Merthyr Tydfil County Borough Council, the council of the local authority of Merthyr Tydfil County Borough in Mid Glamorgan, Wales. This was on the same day as the other 2008 United Kingdom local elections. The previous council election took place in 2004 and the following election was held in 2012.

In the election, the Labour Party lost control of the council to no overall control.

== Results ==
Party	Seats	Change
Independent/Others	19	▲3
Labour	17	▼9
Liberal Democrats	6	▲6

== See also ==
- 2008 Welsh local elections
