= 2022 Merthyr Tydfil County Borough Council election =

2022 Welsh local government election

- 5 May 2022

All 30 seats to Merthyr Tydfil County Borough Council 16 seats needed for a majority
	First party	Second party
	Independent	Labour
Leader	Lisa Mytton	Darren Roberts
Party	Independent	Labour
Leader's seat	Vaynor	Merthyr Vale
Seats before	17	13
Seats won	15	15
Seat change	▼2	▲2
Popular vote	17,281	19,642
Percentage	43.27%	49.18%
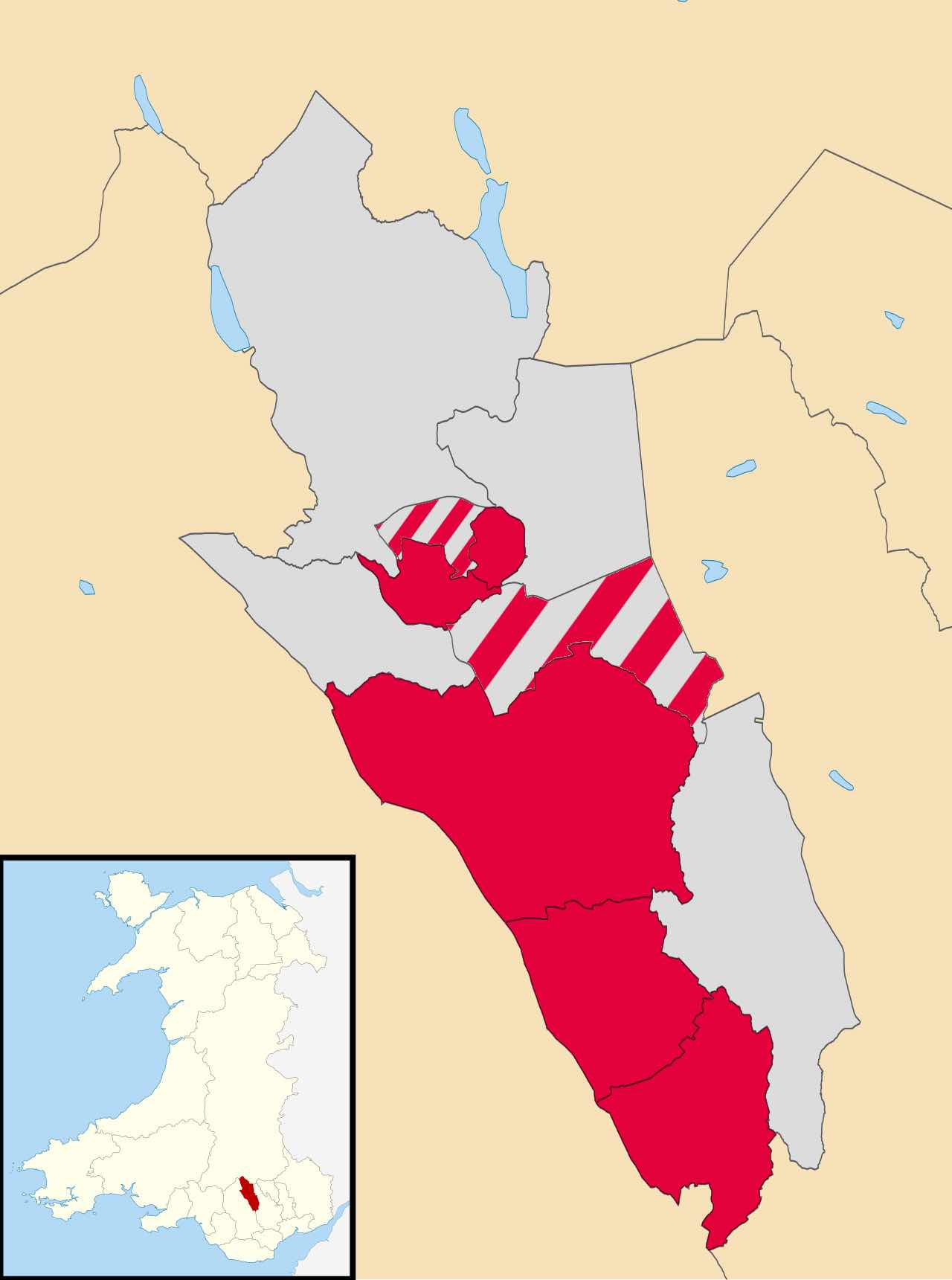
- Map of the election results by electoral ward, coloured in party colours. Stripes indicate wards where two or more councillors is of a different affiliation.

The 2022 Merthyr Tydfil County Borough Council election took place on Thursday 5 May 2022 to elect the 30 members to the Merthyr Tydfil County Borough Council in Wales, as a part of both the 2022 Welsh local elections, and the 2022 United Kingdom local elections. The electoral ward divisions had been altered, and the number of councillors elected had dropped from 33 to 30. The independents lost their majority of the council, and tied with Labour at 15 seats each.

== Results ==
Results
Party	Seats	Change
Independents	15	▼2
Labour Party	15	▲2

== Ward results ==
=== Bedlinog & Trelewis ===
Bedlinog & Trelewis
Party	Candidate	Votes	%	±%
Independent	Malcolm Colbran	581	59.2	
Independent	Michelle Symonds	408	41.5	
Labour	Vanessa Matthews	362	36.9	
Labour	Jeffrey Beard	343	34.9	
Independent	Richard Searl	136	13.8	
Conservative	Edward Dawson	57	5.8	
Turnout		982		
Independent win (new seat)				
Independent win (new seat)				

=== Cyfarthfa ===
Cyfarthfa
Party	Candidate	Votes	%	±%
Independent	Geraint Thomas	1,031	55.9	
Independent	Michelle Jones	836	45.3	
Independent	Claire Jones	701	38.0	
Labour	David Chaplin	696	37.7	
Labour	Kathryn Amaro	654	35.4	
Labour	Andrew Cremin	477	25.8	
Plaid Cymru	Lisbeth McLean	394	21.3	
Conservative	Sarah Phillips	180	9.8	
Turnout		1,846		
Independent win (new seat)				
Independent win (new seat)				
Independent win (new seat)				

=== Dowlais & Pant ===
Dowlais & Pant
Party	Candidate	Votes	%	±%
Independent	Declan Sammon	1,120	68.3	
Independent	Paula Layton	851	51.9	
Independent	David Hughes	803	49.0	
Labour	Richard Owen	485	29.6	
Labour	Sara Beard	480	29.3	
Labour	Simon Williams	470	28.7	
Independent	Jane Plowright	226	13.8	
Plaid Cymru	James Cushen	147	9.0	
Turnout		1,640		
Independent win (new seat)				
Independent win (new seat)				
Independent win (new seat)				

=== Gurnos ===
Gurnos
Party	Candidate	Votes	%	±%
Independent	Jeremy Davies	519	55.2	
Independent	Lee Davies	514	54.7	
Labour	Bill Smith	359	38.2	
Independent	Pauline Griffiths	306	32.6	
Independent	Tony Williams	283	30.1	
Labour	Sue Patman	281	29.9	
Labour	Gav Galleozzie	269	28.6	
Turnout		940		
Independent win (new seat)				
Independent win (new seat)				
Labour win (new seat)				

=== Merthyr Vale ===
Merthyr Vale
Party	Candidate	Votes	%	±%
Labour	Darren Roberts	892	86.4	
Labour	Scott Thomas	716	69.3	
Independent	Lynne Colston	276	26.7	
Turnout		1,033		
Labour win (new seat)				
Labour win (new seat)				

=== Park ===
Park
Party	Candidate	Votes	%	±%
Labour	Clive Jones	701	58.5	
Labour	Louise Minett Vokes	685	57.2	
Independent	Jason Launchbury	479	40.0	
Independent	Janet Morgan	398	33.2	
Turnout		1,198		
Labour win (new seat)				
Labour win (new seat)				

=== Penydarren ===
Penydarren
Party	Candidate	Votes	%	±%
Labour	David Isaac	650	58.1	
Labour	Kevin Gibbs	523	46.7	
Labour	Jamie Scriven	508	45.4	
Independent	Chris Davies	454	40.6	
Independent	Peter Thomas	272	24.3	
Independent	Julian Amos	194	17.3	
Plaid Cymru	Shaun Sullivan	190	17.0	
Independent	Simon Ryan	143	12.8	
Turnout		1,119		
Labour win (new seat)				
Labour win (new seat)				
Labour win (new seat)				

=== Plymouth ===
Plymouth
Party	Candidate	Votes	%	±%
Labour	Gareth Lewis	1,138	80.8	
Labour	Brent Carter	1,061	75.4	
Labour	Anna Williams-Price	879	62.4	
Independent	Lucie John	364	25.9	
Independent	Natasha Evans	349	24.8	
Turnout		1,408		
Labour win (new seat)				
Labour win (new seat)				
Labour win (new seat)				

=== Town ===
Town
Party	Candidate	Votes	%	±%
Labour	Dai Jones	995	46.9	
Independent	John Thomas	943	44.5	
Independent	Andrew Barry	873	41.2	
Independent	Julia Jenkins	826	39.0	
Independent	Kevin O'Neill	807	38.1	
Labour	Kelly McCarthy	716	33.8	
Labour	Rose Maycock	707	33.3	
Labour	Martin Eaglestone	659	31.1	
Plaid Cymru	Shaun O'Malley	368	17.4	
Plaid Cymru	Vivian Pugh	320	15.1	
Plaid Cymru	Ian Gwynne	312	14.7	
Plaid Cymru	Leighton Evans	306	14.4	
Turnout		2,120		
Labour win (new seat)				
Independent win (new seat)				
Independent win (new seat)				
Independent win (new seat)				

=== Treharris ===
Treharris
Party	Candidate	Votes	%	±%
Labour	Gareth Richards	1,635	80.9	
Labour	Ian Thomas	966	47.8	
Labour	Ernie Galsworthy	963	47.6	
Plaid Cymru	Francis Whitefoot	555	27.5	
Independent	Craig Andrews	527	26.1	
Independent	Jason Hughes	488	24.1	
Green	Tim Clayton	174	8.6	
Turnout		2,021		
Labour win (new seat)				
Labour win (new seat)				
Labour win (new seat)				

=== Vaynor ===
Vaynor
Party	Candidate	Votes	%	±%
Independent	Lisa Mytton	655	61.1	
Independent	Clive Tovey	532	49.6	
Independent	Stephen Jones	386	36.0	
Labour	Roy Bish	372	34.7	
Turnout		1,072		
Independent win (new seat)				
Independent win (new seat)				

== By-elections between 2022 and 2027 ==
=== Bedlinog & Trelewis (2024) ===
A by-election took place in Bedlinog & Trelewis on 5 September 2024 following the resignation of Independent councillor, Malcolm Colbran, for personal reasons. The seat was won by Labour.

Bedlinog & Trelewis by-election: 5 September 2024
Party	Candidate	Votes	%	±%
Labour	Gillian Preston	411	48.8	
Independent	Megan Drozd	314	37.2	
Plaid Cymru	Naomi Hughes	83	9.8	
Conservative	Edward Dawson	24	2.8	
Independent	Richard Searl	11	1.3	
Turnout		843	28	
Labour gain from Independent		Swing		

=== Dowlais & Pant (2026) ===
A by-election is due to take place in Dowlais & Pant on 25 June 2026 following the resignation of Reform UK councillor, David Hughes, following his election as a Member of the Senedd (MS) for Pontypridd Cynon Merthyr. The seat was won by Labour.

Dowlais & Pant by-election: 25 June 2026
Party	Candidate	Votes	%	±%
Labour	Dean Barrett	356	40.1	
Independent	Nick Meaney	215	24.2	
Reform	Terry Donegan	160	18	
Plaid Cymru	James Cushen	125	14.1	
Green	Janeen Davies	20	2.3	
Conservative	Roxanne Richardson	11	1.2	
Turnout		887	18	
Labour gain from Independent		Swing		
