= Jim Lewis (footballer, born 1909) =

Welsh footballer

Personal information
- Full name: Daniel James Lewis
- Date of birth: 21 June 1909
- Place of birth: Troed-y-rhiw, Wales
- Date of death: 7 October 1980 (aged 71)
- Place of death: Tipton St John, Devon, England
- Height: 5 ft 10 in (1.78 m)
- Position: Full back

Youth career
- New Tredegar

Senior career*
Years	Team	Apps	(Gls)
1931–1944	Watford	111	(0)
- * Club domestic league appearances and goals

Daniel James Lewis (21 June 1909 – 7 October 1980) was a Welsh professional footballer. He played as a full back in the English Football League for Watford from 1931 until 1939, when football was suspended due to the Second World War. During the final five league seasons, Lewis played regularly as Watford consistently finished in the top six positions in the Third Division South, and won the 1937 Third Division South Cup. He made a total of 124 Watford appearances in peacetime competitions, and a further 72 in wartime ones.
