= Merthyr Tydfil County Borough Council =

Local government of Merthyr Tydfil County Borough, Wales

Merthyr Tydfil County Borough Council Cyngor Bwrdeistref Sirol Merthyr Tudful (Welsh)
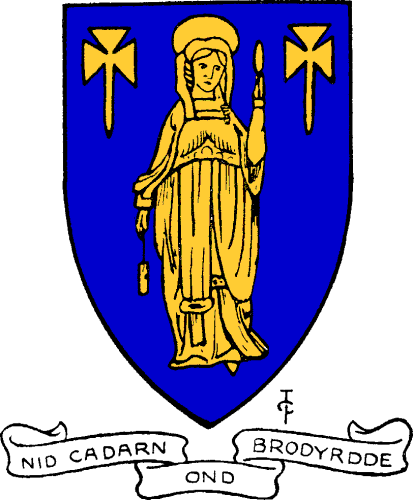

Type
- Type: Principal council of Merthyr Tydfil County Borough

History
- Founded: 1905 (Municipal borough); 1908 (County borough); 1974 (Borough); 1 April 1996 (County Borough)

Leadership
- Mayor: David Isaac, Labour since 13 May 2026
- Leader: Brent Carter, Labour since 18 September 2024
- Chief Executive: Ellis Cooper since 17 June 2021

Structure
- Seats: 30 councillors
- Graph of the party split among 30 seats.
- Political groups: All parties (30) Labour (15) Independent (15)
- Length of term: 5 years

Elections
- Voting system: First-past-the-post
- Last election: 5 May 2022
- Next election: 6 May 2027

Meeting place
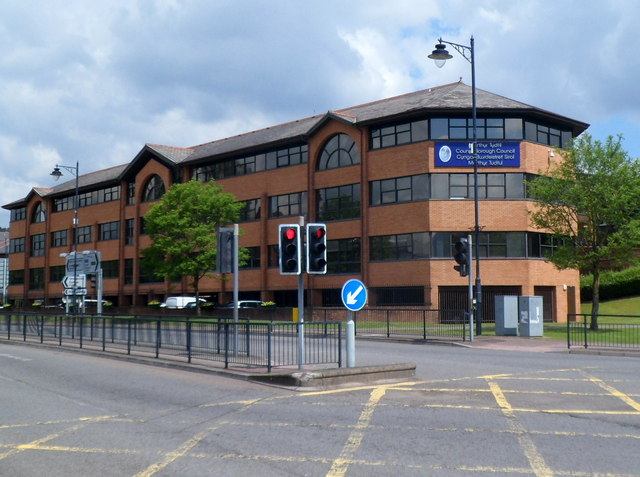
- Civic Centre, Castle Street, Merthyr Tydfil, CF47 8AN

Website
- www.merthyr.gov.uk

Merthyr Tydfil County Borough Council (Welsh: Cyngor Bwrdeistref Sirol Merthyr Tudful) is the local authority for the county borough of Merthyr Tydfil, one of the principal areas of Wales. The council is based at the Civic Centre on Castle Street in Merthyr Tydfil. The council has been under no overall control since 2017. A minority Labour administration has been running the council since 2024, supported by some of the independent councillors.

== History ==
The parish of Merthyr Tydfil was governed by a local board from 1850 until 1894, when it was replaced by an urban district council. The urban district was incorporated as a borough in 1905, creating the first Merthyr Tydfil Borough Council. In 1908 the council took over county-level functions from Glamorgan County Council in the area, becoming a county borough. It retained county borough status until 1974, when there were significant changes to local government under the Local Government Act 1972. From 1974 until 1996, Merthyr Tydfil Borough Council was a lower-tier district council, with Mid Glamorgan County Council providing county-level services in the area. Since the abolition of Mid Glamorgan County Council in 1996, Merthyr Tydfil has again been a county borough.

== Political control ==
The council has been under no overall control since 2017. Following the 2022 election, the independents and Labour each had 15 councillors. The independents managed to form the council's administration on the mayor's casting vote. Following a number of changes of allegiance and a by-election, the independent administration was replaced in September 2024 with a minority Labour administration. Two of the independent councillors subsequently joined Labour in the council's cabinet.

The first election to the council following the Local Government Act 1972 was held in 1973, initially operating as a shadow authority before coming into its revised powers on 1 April 1974. Political control of the council since 1974 has been as follows:

Lower-tier borough

Party in control	Years
Labour	1974–1976
Plaid Cymru	1976–1979
Labour	1979–1996

County borough

Party in control	Years
Labour	1996–1999
No overall control	1999–2004
Labour	2004–2008
Independent	2008–2012
Labour	2012–2017
No overall control	2017–present

=== Leadership ===
The role of Mayor of Merthyr Tydfil is largely ceremonial. Political leadership is instead provided by the leader of the council. The leaders since 2002 have been:

Councillor	Party	From	To
Harvey Jones	Labour	2002	May 2008
Jeff Edwards	Independent	May 2008	May 2012
Brendan Toomey	Labour	16 May 2012	May 2017
Kevin O'Neill	Independent	14 Jun 2017	23 Dec 2020
Lisa Mytton	Independent	20 Jan 2021	May 2022
Geraint Thomas	Independent	25 May 2022	18 Sep 2024
Brent Carter	Labour	18 Sep 2024	

=== Composition ===
Following the 2022 election, and subsequent by-elections and changes of allegiance up to June 2026, the composition of the council was:

Party	Seats
Labour	15
Independent	15
Total	30

Nine of the independent councillors sit together as the 'Independent Group', two form the 'Dowlais and Pant Community Independents' and the other four are not aligned to a group. Cabinet positions are held Labour and one of the non-aligned independents. The next election is due in 2027.

== Elections ==
Since 2012, elections have been held every five years:

Year	Seats	Labour	Independent / Others	Liberal Democrats	Plaid Cymru	Notes
1995	33	**29**	4	0	0	Labour majority controlled
1999	33	**16**	13	0	4	
2004	33	**17**	16	0	0	Labour majority controlled
2008	33	8	**19**	6	0	Independent majority controlled
2012	33	**23**	10	0	0	Labour majority controlled
2017	33	15	**18**	0	0	Independent majority controlled
2022	30	**15**	**15**	0	0	New ward boundaries. No overall control; independent-led.

Party with the most elected councillors in bold. Coalition agreements in notes column.

== Premises ==
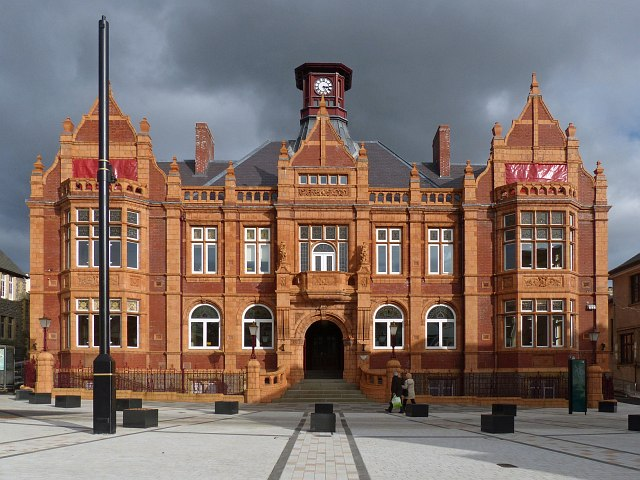
Old Town Hall: Council's headquarters until 1989.

Until 1989 the council was based at Merthyr Tydfil Town Hall, which had been built between 1896 and 1898 for the old urban district council. In 1989 a new civic centre was built on Castle Street, which opened as the council's headquarters at the start of January 1990.

== Electoral divisions ==
Electoral divisions in Merthyr Tydfil

The county borough is divided into 11 electoral wards returning 30 councillors. Most of these wards are coterminous with communities (parishes) of the same name.

Bedlinog & Trelewis Community Council is the only community council in Merthyr Tydfil.

The following table lists council wards, communities and associated geographical areas.

Ward	Communities (Parishes)	Other geographic areas
Bedlinog ^{c}	Bedlinog	Cwmfelin, Trelewis
Cyfarthfa ^{c}	Cyfarthfa	Clwydyfagwyr, Gelli-deg, Heolgerrig, Winch Fawr, Ynysfach
Dowlais	Dowlais; Pantyscallog	Pantyscallog, Rhydybedd, Tair Twynau, Dowlais Top, Caeharris, Caeracca,
Gurnos ^{c}	Gurnos	
Merthyr Vale ^{c}	Merthyr Vale	Aberfan, Mount Pleasant,
Park ^{c}	Park	
Penydarren ^{c}	Penydarren	Galon Uchaf
Plymouth	Troed-y-rhiw	Abercanaid, Pentrebach
Town ^{c}	Town	Twynyrodyn, Penyard
Treharris ^{c}	Treharris	Quakers Yard, Pentwyn, Fiddler's Elbow, Edwardsville
Vaynor ^{c}	Vaynor	Cefn Coed, Pontsticill, Trefechan

^{c} = Ward coterminous with community of the same name

== See also ==
- List of electoral wards in Merthyr Tydfil County Borough
