= Town, Merthyr Tydfil =

Town: Welsh: Y Dref
- Community and electoral ward
- Location within Merthyr Tydfil
- Population: 7,671 (2011 census)
- Principal area: Merthyr Tydfil
- Country: Wales
- Sovereign state: United Kingdom
- UK Parliament: Merthyr Tydfil and Aberdare
- Senedd Cymru – Welsh Parliament: Merthyr Tydfil and Rhymney
- Councillors: 4 (County)
- List of places UK Wales Merthyr Tydfil 51.746°N 3.369°W Map of the community

Town (Welsh: Y Dref) is the name of a local government community and electoral ward in the town of Merthyr Tydfil, in Merthyr Tydfil County Borough, Wales.

== Description ==
The Town community covers Merthyr Tydfil town centre east of the River Taff, stretching as far as Merthyr Common and the border with Caerphilly County Borough. It includes the residential areas of Cae-draw, Penyard, Penyrheol, Thomastown, Twynyrodyn and Ysgubor Newydd. The community of Troed-y-rhiw borders to the south, Cyfarthfa to the west, Park, Penydarren and Dowlais to the north and the Caerphilly community of Darran Valley to the east.

According to the 2011 UK Census the population of the community/ward was 7,671.

As well as the High Street and town centre the community includes Merthyr Tydfil railway station and Merthyr Tydfil bus station. Merthyr Tydfil's main Church in Wales church, St Tydfil's, is located at the bottom of the High Street. There are a number of schools in the community, including Cyfarthfa High School.

== Governance ==
Town is an electoral ward which elects four councillors to Merthyr Tydfil County Borough Council. At the May 2017 elections Town elected three Independent councillors (John Thomas, Kevin O'Neill, Andrew Barry) topped the poll, with the fourth councillor from the Labour Party (Dai Jones). Town has elected a broad political spectrum of councillors since 1995. Between 1995 and 1999 and 2012–2017 the ward elected four Labour councillors. Between 1999 and 2004 the ward was represented by Plaid Cymru. Between 2004 and 2008 three of the councillors were elected under the People Before Politics (PBP) banner. Between 2008 and 2012 the ward was represented by the Liberal Democrats.

By-elections took place in the ward on 23 October 2008 and 7 May 2015, both won by Labour.
