= Pen y Dre High School =

Coordinates: 51.767°N 3.380°W

Pen y Dre High School Welsh: Ysgol Uwchradd Pen y Dre

Location
- Gurnos, Merthyr Tydfil County Borough; Wales

Information
- Motto: Aspire Achieve Believe
- Head teacher: Keith Maher
- Gender: Mixed
- Age: 11 to 16
- Website: www.penydre.merthyr.sch.uk

Pen y Dre High School is an 11-16 mixed-sex comprehensive school situated in the Gurnos district of Merthyr Tydfil, Wales.

== School Structure ==
The school's motto is "Aspire Achieve Believe". Its current headteacher is Keith Maher.
