= 2022 Monmouthshire County Council election =

Welsh local election

- 5 May 2022

All 46 (previously 43) seats to Monmouthshire County Council 24 seats needed for a majority

	First party	Second party	Third party
Leader	Mary Ann Brocklesby	Richard John
Party	Labour	Conservative	Liberal Democrats
Leader's seat	Llanelly Hill	Mitchel Troy and Trellech United
Last election	10	25	3
Seats won	22	18	0
Seat change	▲12	▼7	▼3
	Fourth party	Fifth party
Leader		Ian Chandler
Party	Independents	Green
Leader's seat		Llantilio Crossenny
Last election	5	0
Seats won	5	1
Seat change	0	▲1
- Map showing the results of the 2022 Monmouthshire County Council elections.
Council control before election
Conservative
Council control after election
Labour

The 2022 election to Monmouthshire County Council took place on 5 May 2022 as part of the 2022 Welsh local elections.

The Welsh Conservatives lost overall control of the council, whilst the Lib Dems were wiped out. The Greens elected their first councillor in Monmouthshire in the Llantilio Crossenny ward.

Following the election Labour formed a minority administration, though they formed a coalition with the Greens in May 2023.

The election took place on the basis of revised ward boundaries, and an increase in the number of councillors from 43 to 46.

== Results ==
Results
Party	Seats	Change
Labour Party	22	▲12
Conservative Party	18	▼7
Independents	5	0
Green Party	1	▲1
Liberal Democrats	0	▼3

== Ward results ==
=== Bulwark and Thornwell ===
Bulwark and Thornwell
Party	Candidate	Votes	%	±%
Labour	Armand Watts	693	62.8	
Labour	Sue Riley	635	57.5	
Conservative	Keeley Rooke	268	24.3	
Conservative	Laura Dunn	232	21.0	
Liberal Democrats	Anthea Dewhurst	134	12.1	
Turnout		1,104		
Labour win (new seat)				
Labour win (new seat)				

=== Caerwent ===
Caerwent
Party	Candidate	Votes	%	±%
Conservative	Phil Murphy	457	60.8	
Labour	Steve Hoselitz	168	22.3	
Green	Bernie Howley	69	9.2	
Liberal Democrats	Phil Hobson	58	7.7	
Majority		289	38.5	
Turnout		757		
Conservative hold		Swing		

=== Caldicot Castle ===
Caldicot Castle
Party	Candidate	Votes	%	±%
Labour	Rachel Garrick	305	42.4	
Conservative	Ben Harris	233	32.4	
Liberal Democrats	Jo Watkins	182	25.3	
Majority		72	10.0	
Turnout		724		
Labour gain from Liberal Democrats		Swing		

=== Caldicot Cross ===
Caldicot Cross
Party	Candidate	Votes	%	±%
Labour	Jackie Strong	331	47.1	
Independent	Alan Davies	174	24.8	
Conservative	Edward Saville	132	18.8	
Liberal Democrats	Kerry Wreford-Bush	66	9.4	
Majority		157	22.3	
Turnout		703		
Labour win (new seat)				

=== Cantref ===
Cantref
Party	Candidate	Votes	%	±%
Labour	Sara Burch	476	49.3	
Conservative	Paul Jordan	371	38.4	
Green	Jeremy Callard	67	6.9	
Liberal Democrats	Vicky Hepburn-John	52	5.4	
Majority		105	10.9	
Turnout		973		
Labour gain from Conservative		Swing		

=== Chepstow Castle & Larkfield ===
Chepstow Castle & Larkfield
Party	Candidate	Votes	%	±%
Labour	Paul Griffiths	432	41.9	
Labour	Dale Rooke	381	37.0	
Liberal Democrats	Jez Becker	313	30.4	
Conservative	Marc Le Peltier	295	28.6	
Conservative	Graham Coombs	289	28.0	
Liberal Democrats	Dominic Power	210	20.4	
Turnout		1,031		
Labour win (new seat)				
Labour win (new seat)				

=== Croesonen ===
Croesonen
Party	Candidate	Votes	%	±%
Labour	Su McConnel	368	66.2	
Conservative	Mehmet Muftuoglu	147	26.4	
Liberal Democrats	Didier Duchet	41	7.4	
Majority		221	39.8	
Turnout		558		
Labour hold		Swing		

=== Crucorney ===
Crucorney
Party	Candidate	Votes	%	±%
Independent	David Jones	416	47.9	
Conservative	Rachel Buckler	251	28.9	
Green	Ginny Baillie	108	12.4	
Labour	Kyle Eldridge	94	10.8	
Majority		165	19.0	
Turnout		870		
Independent hold		Swing		

=== Devauden ===
Devauden
Party	Candidate	Votes	%	±%
Conservative	Bob Greenland	318	49.3	
Labour	Margaret Griffiths	198	30.7	
Green	Emily Fairman	66	10.2	
Liberal Democrats	Moira Coleman	63	9.8	
Majority		120	18.6	
Turnout		650		
Conservative hold		Swing		

=== Dewstow ===
Dewstow
Party	Candidate	Votes	%	±%
Labour	Tony Easson	303	71.5	
Conservative	Carol Carne	78	18.4	
Liberal Democrats	Caroline Duchet	27	6.4	
Green	Clive Shakesheff	16	3.8	
Majority		225	53.1	
Turnout		425		
Labour hold		Swing		

=== Drybridge ===
Drybridge
Party	Candidate	Votes	%	±%
Labour	Catrin Maby	263	36.2	
Conservative	Mat Feakins	213	29.3	
Independent	Martyn Ford	178	24.5	
Green	Karin Chandler	73	10.0	
Majority		50	6.9	
Turnout		733		
Labour gain from Conservative		Swing		

=== Gobion Fawr ===
Gobion Fawr
Party	Candidate	Votes	%	±%
Conservative	Alistair Neill	399	52.0	
Labour	John Riley	188	24.5	
Liberal Democrats	Steve Pritchard	95	12.4	
Green	Alison Pritchard	86	11.2	
Majority		211	27.5	
Turnout		771		
Conservative win (new seat)				

=== Goetre Fawr ===
Goetre Fawr
Party	Candidate	Votes	%	±%
Conservative	Jan Butler	412	49.8	
Labour	Janet Robins	313	37.8	
Green	Alan Williams	103	12.4	
Majority		99	12.0	
Turnout		828		
Conservative win (new seat)				

=== Grofield ===
Grofield
Party	Candidate	Votes	%	±%
Labour	Laura Wright	523	60.7	
Conservative	Sheila Woodhouse	338	39.3	
Majority		185	21.4	
Turnout		861		
Labour win (new seat)				

=== Lansdown ===
Lansdown
Party	Candidate	Votes	%	±%
Labour	Martyn Groucutt	315	63.3	
Conservative	Victoria Camp	104	20.9	
Independent	Kevin Williams	79	15.9	
Majority		211	42.4	
Turnout		498		
Labour win (new seat)				

=== Llanbadoc & Usk ===
Llanbadoc & Usk
Party	Candidate	Votes	%	±%
Independent	Meirion Howells	847	48.9	
Conservative	Tony Kear	755	43.6	
Independent	Val Smith	523	30.2	
Conservative	Amberley Morgan	493	28.5	
Labour	Philip Bowyer	210	12.1	
Green	Ceri Goring	185	10.7	
Labour	Roger Harris	183	10.6	
Liberal Democrats	Elliot Hepburn-John	78	4.5	
Majority		232	13.4	
Turnout		1,732		
Independent win (new seat)				
Conservative win (new seat)				

=== Llanelly Hill ===
Llanelly Hill
Party	Candidate	Votes	%	±%
Independent	Simon Howarth	619	35.7	
Labour	Mary Brocklesby	518	30.7	
Conservative	Jane Pratt	509	30.2	
Independent	Giles Howard	436	25.8	
Labour	Gareth Wilde	407	24.1	
Conservative	Richard Dixon	368	21.8	
Independent	Tony Carrington	160	9.5	
Green	Matthew Barney	157	9.3	
Liberal Democrats	Tony Redhead	60	3.6	
Majority		9	0.5	
Turnout		1,687		
Independent win (new seat)				
Labour win (new seat)				

=== Llanfoist & Govilon ===
Llanfoist & Govilon
Party	Candidate	Votes	%	±%
Labour	Ben Callard	727	50.0	
Conservative	Tomos Davies	679	46.7	
Labour	Bryony Nicholson	679	46.7	
Conservative	Hannah Jarvis	676	46.5	
Majority		0	0.0	
Turnout		1,453		
Independent win (new seat)				
Labour win (new seat)				

=== Llangybi Fawr ===
Llangybi Fawr
Party	Candidate	Votes	%	±%
Conservative	Fay Bromfield	357	47.2	
Independent	Andy Hunt	257	34.0	
Labour	Sally Ashby	91	12.0	
Green	Sarah Windrum	48	6.3	
Independent	Peter Marshall	3	0.4	
Majority		100	13.2	
Turnout		756		
Conservative win (new seat)				

=== Llantilio Crossenny ===
Llantilio Crossenny
Party	Candidate	Votes	%	±%
Green	Ian Chandler	474	52.7	
Conservative	Ruth Edwards	329	36.6	
Labour	Ann Eggleton	97	10.8	
Majority		145	16.1	
Turnout		900		
Green win (new seat)				

=== Magor East with Undy ===
Magor East with Undy
Party	Candidate	Votes	%	±%
Labour	John Crook	760	56.9	
Labour	Angela Sandles	651	48.8	
Conservative	Sally Raggett	507	38.0	
Conservative	Gareth Hughes	445	33.3	
Liberal Democrats	Mark Hitchins	118	8.8	
Majority		144	10.8	
Turnout		1,335		
Labour win (new seat)				
Labour win (new seat)				

=== Magor West ===
Magor West
Party	Candidate	Votes	%	±%
Independent	Frances Taylor	553	76.9	
Labour	Penny Simcock	101	14.0	
Conservative	Oliver Morgan	65	9.0	
Majority		452	62.9	
Turnout		719		
Independent win (new seat)				

=== Mardy ===
Mardy
Party	Candidate	Votes	%	±%
Conservative	Malcolm Lane	256	42.0	
Labour	Gethin Jones	178	29.2	
Independent	Ralph Chapman	123	20.2	
Liberal Democrats	Ian Prince	52	8.5	
Majority		78	12.8	
Turnout		609		
Conservative win (new seat)				

=== Mitchel Troy and Trellech United ===
Mitchel Troy and Trellech United
Party	Candidate	Votes	%	±%
Conservative	Richard John	753	45.9	
Conservative	Jayne McKenna	730	44.5	
Liberal Democrats	Martin Blakebrough	626	38.1	
Green	Joe Atkinson	365	22.2	
Labour	Alison Denton	304	18.5	
Labour	Laura McConnel	224	13.6	
Majority		104	6.4	
Turnout		1,642		
Conservative win (new seat)				
Conservative win (new seat)				

=== Mount Pleasant ===
Mount Pleasant
Party	Candidate	Votes	%	±%
Conservative	Paul Pavia	333	42.6	
Liberal Democrats	Emma Becker	304	38.9	
Labour	Peter Marsh-Jenks	144	18.4	
Majority		29	3.7	
Turnout		781		
Conservative win (new seat)				

=== Osbaston ===
Osbaston
Party	Candidate	Votes	%	±%
Conservative	Jane Lesley Lucas	416	48.7	
Labour	David Richard Simcock	240	28.1	
Green	Jill Cantor	102	11.9	
Liberal Democrats	Evan Roberts	97	11.3	
Majority		176	20.6	
Turnout		858		
Conservative win (new seat)				

=== Overmonnow ===
Overmonnow
Party	Candidate	Votes	%	±%
Labour	Steven Garratt	262	45.3	
Conservative	Jamie Treharne	200	34.6	
Independent	Kelly Jackson-Graham	89	15.4	
Green	Andrew Were	27	4.7	
Majority		62	10.7	
Turnout		578		
Labour win (new seat)				

=== Park ===
Park
Party	Candidate	Votes	%	±%
Labour	Tudor Thomas	553	75.3	
Conservative	Fred Morgan	181	24.7	
Majority		372	50.6	
Turnout		734		
Labour win (new seat)				

=== Pen Y Fal ===
Pen Y Fal
Party	Candidate	Votes	%	±%
Conservative	Maureen Powell	389	45.5	
Labour	Matthew Strong	376	44.0	
Liberal Democrats	Tudor Jones	90	10.5	
Majority		13	1.5	
Turnout		855		
Conservative win (new seat)				

=== Portskewett ===
Portskewett
Party	Candidate	Votes	%	±%
Conservative	Lisa Dymock	558	61.3	
Labour	Tom Kirton	291	31.9	
Liberal Democrats	Tim Wreford-Bush	62	6.8	
Majority		267	29.4	
Turnout		911		
Conservative win (new seat)				

=== Raglan ===
Raglan
Party	Candidate	Votes	%	±%
Conservative	Penny Jones	422	46.6	
Liberal Democrats	Nick Ramsay	294	32.5	
Labour	Maggie Harris	190	21.0	
Majority		128	14.1	
Turnout		906		
Conservative win (new seat)				

=== Rogiet ===
Rogiet
Party	Candidate	Votes	%	±%
Labour	Peter Strong	187	31.7	
Independent	Paul Cromwell	168	28.5	
Independent	Sebastian McVicker-Orringe	141	23.9	
Conservative	Ella Davies	47	8.0	
Liberal Democrats	Pete Milmine	47	8.0	
Majority		19	3.2	
Turnout		590		
Labour win (new seat)				

=== Severn ===
Severn
Party	Candidate	Votes	%	±%
Labour	Maria Stevens	256	43.3	
Liberal Democrats	Cris Watkins	154	26.1	
Conservative	Sue Standing	126	21.3	
Independent	Kay Harris	55	9.3	
Majority		102	17.2	
Turnout		591		
Labour win (new seat)				

=== Shirenewton ===
Shirenewton
Party	Candidate	Votes	%	±%
Conservative	Louise Brown	493	61.5	
Labour	Hugo Perks	308	38.5	
Majority		185	23.0	
Turnout		801		
Conservative win (new seat)				

=== St Arvans ===
St Arvans
Party	Candidate	Votes	%	±%
Conservative	Ann Webb	341	43.7	
Labour	Vanessa Dodd	217	27.8	
Liberal Democrats	Reuben Blakebrough	89	11.4	
Green	Paul Rollings	78	10.0	
Independent	Steve Pocock	56	7.2	
Majority		124	15.9	
Turnout		781		
Conservative win (new seat)				

=== St Kingsmark ===
St Kingsmark
Party	Candidate	Votes	%	±%
Conservative	Christopher Edwards	399	55.7	
Labour	Hilary Beach	212	29.6	
Liberal Democrats	Jenni Brews	105	14.7	
Majority		187	26.1	
Turnout		716		
Conservative win (new seat)				

=== Town ===
Town
Party	Candidate	Votes	%	±%
Labour	Catherine Fookes	339	46.3	
Conservative	Abbie Katsande	212	29.0	
Independent	David Cummings	142	19.4	
Green	Ann Were	39	5.3	
Majority		127	17.3	
Turnout		732		
Labour win (new seat)				

=== West End ===
West End
Party	Candidate	Votes	%	±%
Labour	Jill Bond	316	65.8	
Independent	Jimmy Harris	101	21.0	
Conservative	Joanne Fox	63	13.1	
Majority		215	44.8	
Turnout		480		
Labour win (new seat)				

=== Wyesham ===
Wyesham
Party	Candidate	Votes	%	±%
Independent	Emma Bryn	305	46.1	
Conservative	Robert Hatton	207	31.3	
Labour	Alice Fletcher	150	22.7	
Majority		98	14.8	
Turnout		662		
Independent win (new seat)				

== By-elections ==
=== Town (2024) ===
Town
Party	Candidate	Votes	%	±%
Conservative	Martin Newell	350	58.9	+29.9
Labour	Jackie Atkin	184	31.0	−15.3
Green	Paul Rollings	41	6.9	+1.6
Liberal Democrats	Jez Becker	19	3.2	N/A
Majority		166	27.9	+10.6
Turnout		594	33.7	−7.8
Conservative gain from Labour		Swing		
