= David Hughes (politician) =

Welsh politician

David Hughes MS
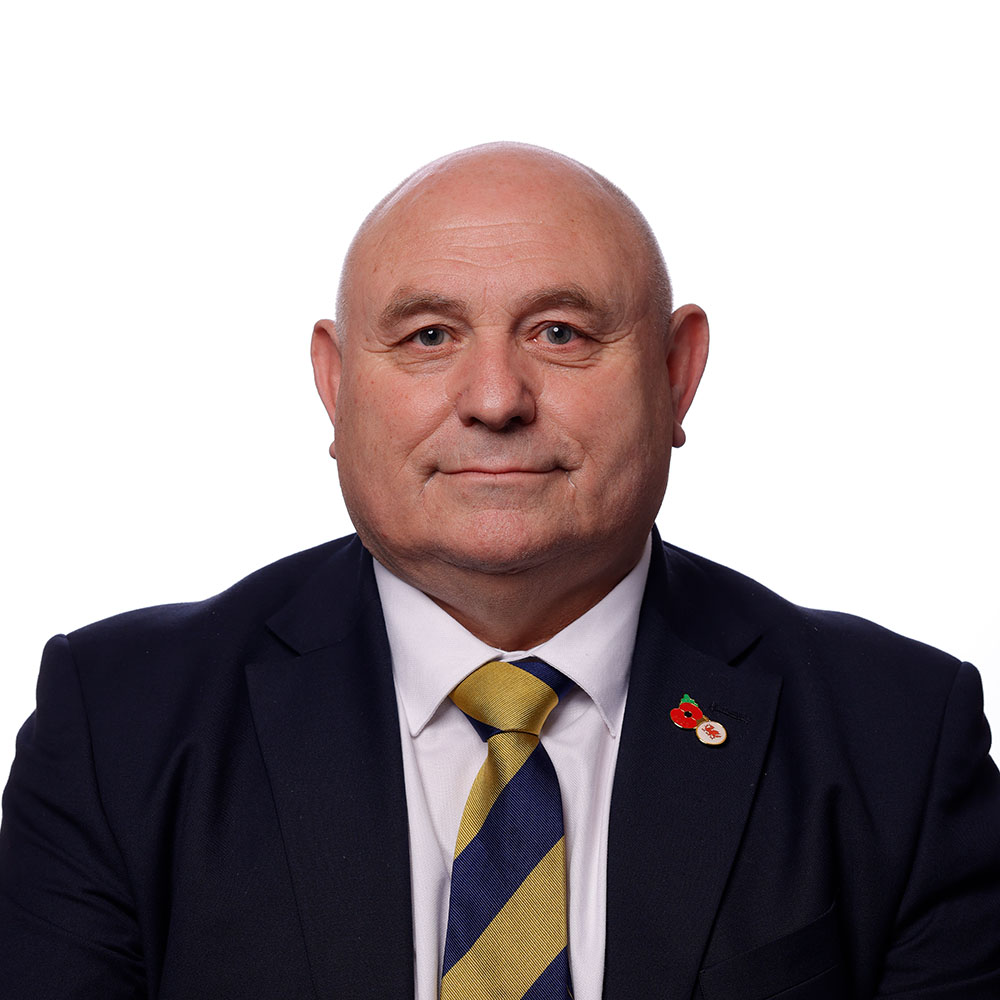
- Official portrait, 2026

Member of the Senedd for Pontypridd Cynon Merthyr
- Incumbent
- Assumed office 8 May 2026

Merthyr Tydfil County Borough Councillor for Dowlais & Pant
- In office 4 May 2017 – 9 May 2026

Personal details
- Party: Reform UK (since 2025)
- Other political affiliations: Independent (2017–2025)

David Hughes is a Welsh politician who has been a Member of the Senedd (MS) for Pontypridd Cynon Merthyr since 2026. He had also served as a member of Merthyr Tydfil County Borough Council for Dowlais & Pant from 2017 to 2026. Elected as an independent, he joined Reform UK in 2025.

== See also ==
- 7th Senedd
