= Troed-y-rhiw =

Coordinates: 51°42′44″N 3°20′42″W

- Village and community
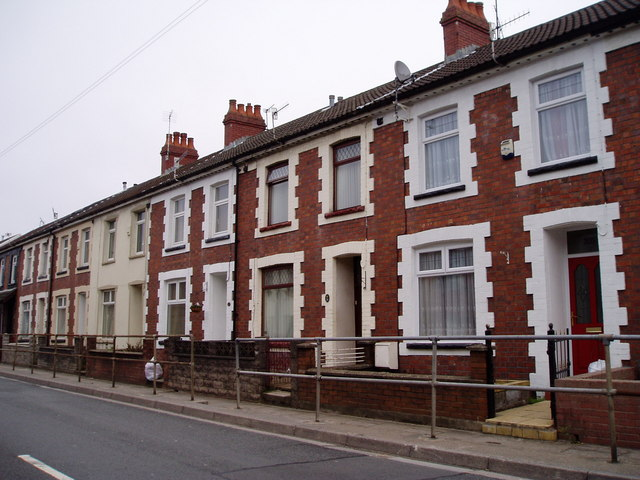
- Rhodfa Terrace, Troed-y-Rhiw

- Location within Merthyr Tydfil
- Principal area: Merthyr Tydfil
- Country: Wales
- Sovereign state: United Kingdom
- Police: South Wales
- Fire: South Wales
- Ambulance: Welsh
- List of places UK Wales Merthyr Tydfil Map of the community

Troed-y-rhiw (Welsh pronunciation: [ˌtrɔi̯d ə ˈr̥ɪu̯], 'foot of the slope') is a village and community in the county borough of Merthyr Tydfil, Wales. Its population at the 2011 census was 5,296. It features the Troed-y-rhiw railway station.

== Governance ==
The community shares a border with the electoral ward of Plymouth, which elects three county councillors to Merthyr Tydfil County Borough Council. At the May 2017 elections the ward re-elected three Labour Party councillors.

== Community Archives Wales ==
In 2007 the Troedyrhiw Environment Forum joined the Community Archives Wales programme. The Environment Forum is a part of the Troedyrhiw Community Partnership which has approximately 30 registered members who attend all kinds of different forums including a Residents Association, Scouts Group and Old Age Persons Group. The Environment Forum has engaged all parts of the community in a range of community projects, including the Trevithick Heritage Trail.

== Notable people ==
- Welsh international footballer Charlie Jones, who played for Nottingham Forest and Arsenal in the 1920s and 1930s, was born in Troed-y-rhiw in 1899.
- His Welsh international colleague Willie Davies, who played for several clubs, including Cardiff City and Tottenham Hotspur in the 1920s and 1930s, was born in Troed-y-rhiw in 1900.
- Bobby Weale was another footballer born (in 1903) in Troed-y-rhiw. His career took him to Swindon Town and Southampton before returning to Wales to play for Cardiff City, Newport County and Wrexham.
- Footballer Jim Lewis was born in Troed-y-rhiw in 1909 and played at left back for Watford from 1930 to 1939.
- His younger brother, George Lewis was also born in Troed-y-rhiw (in 1913) and played football as a centre forward, first for Watford and then for Southampton.
- Footballer Gwyn Jones, who played for Rochdale and Stockport County, was born in Troed-y-rhiw in 1912.
- Vivian Woodward was born in Troed-y-rhiw in 1914 and played at inside-forward for Fulham from 1936 to 1947, with later spells at Millwall, Brentford and Aldershot, as well as playing once for Wales.
- Actor Steve Speirs was born in Troed-y-rhiw in 1965.
