= Cyfarthfa =

- Location within Merthyr Tydfil
- Population: 6,869 (2011)
- OS grid reference: SO034067
- Principal area: Merthyr Tydfil
- Preserved county: Mid Glamorgan
- Country: Wales
- Sovereign state: United Kingdom
- Post town: Merthyr Tydfil
- Postcode district: CF48
- Dialling code: 01685
- Police: South Wales
- Fire: South Wales
- Ambulance: Welsh
- UK Parliament: Merthyr Tydfil and Aberdare
- Senedd Cymru – Welsh Parliament: Merthyr Tydfil and Rhymney
- List of places UK Wales Merthyr Tydfil 51.7512°N 3.3996°W Map of the community

Cyfarthfa is a community and electoral ward in the west of the town of Merthyr Tydfil in Merthyr Tydfil County Borough, Wales.

== Community ==
Cyfarthfa mainly consists of the settlements of Gellideg and Heolgerrig and Rhyd-y-car area just west of Merthyr Tydfil town. It is mostly bordered to the east by the A470 trunk road and to the north by the 'Heads of the Valleys' A465. Cyfarthfa Castle is located just to the east in the neighbouring community of Park. Cyfarthfa has strong historical ties to the industrial past of Merthyr Tydfil, the site of Cyfarthfa Ironworks was just to the east, by the River Taff.

At the 2001 census, it had a population of 6141, increasing to 6,869 at the 2011 Census.

== Electoral ward ==
Prior to 1995 Cyfarthfa was an electoral ward to Mid Glamorgan County Council (electing one councillor) and Merthyr Tydfil Borough Council.

Subsequent to 1995 Cyfarthfa became an electoral ward to Merthyr Tydfil County Borough Council, electing three councillors. Since 1995 the ward has largely elected Independent councillors standing under a variety of tickets, with the occasional Labour Party councillor. At the May 2017 elections the vote in Cyfarthfa was delayed until 8 June, because of the death of one of the candidates, Ieuan Harris. The result was seats being won by Geraint Thomas (Independent), Paul Brown (Merthyr Independents) and David Chaplin (Labour). The turnout was the highest in the borough, at 64%.

Following the May 2012 elections Cyfarthfa was represented by two Merthyr Independents. Councillor Les Elliott resigned only two months later on health grounds, triggering a by-election which took place on 15 November 2012. The by-election was won by Labour's Margaret Davies, who beat the replacement Merthyr Independents candidate by 21 votes.

Sitting Independent councillor, Paul Brown, died in February 2019, leading to a by-election being held on 11 April 2019.

== See also ==
- Cyfarthfa Castle
