= Pant, Merthyr Tydfil =

Village and community in Merthyr Tydfil, Wales

Coordinates: 51.774°N 3.361°W

Pant
- Village and community
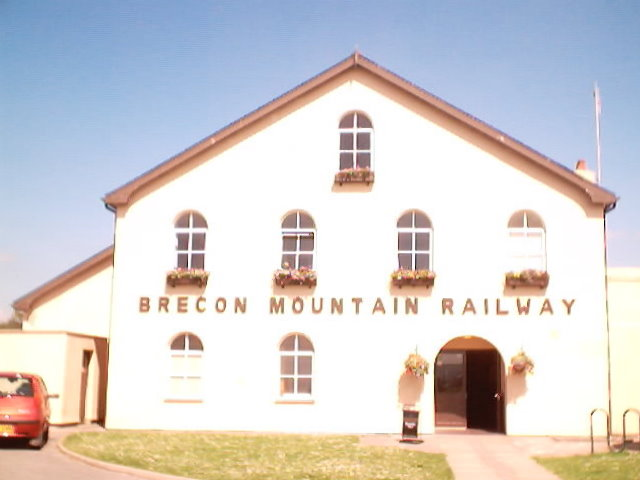
- Pant Station, Brecon Mountain Railway

- Location within Merthyr Tydfil
- Principal area: Merthyr Tydfil
- Country: Wales
- Sovereign state: United Kingdom
- Police: South Wales
- Fire: South Wales
- Ambulance: Welsh
- List of places UK Wales Merthyr Tydfil Map of the community

Pant is a village and community on the outskirts of Merthyr Tydfil, a large former mining town in the South Wales Valleys, Wales. Pant is notable for being the starting point of the Brecon Mountain Railway, and the site of the former Morlais railway tunnel, which runs underneath the village and emerges in the middle of it. The population of the community at the 2011 census was 2,656.
