= Plymouth, Merthyr Tydfil =

Coordinates: 51.7256°N 3.3567°W

Plymouth
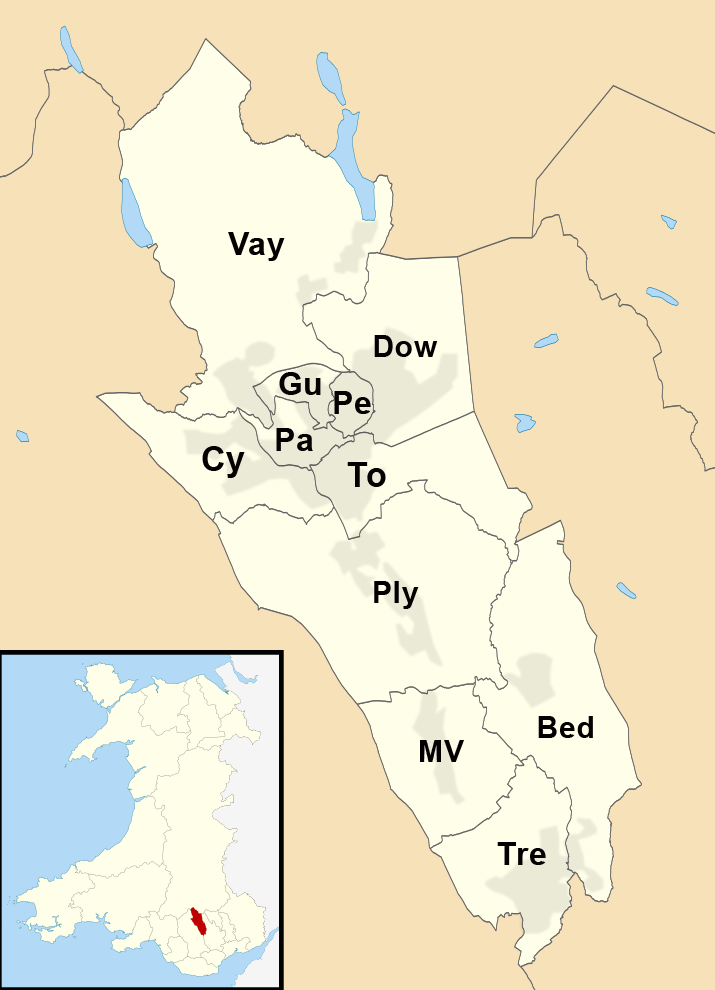
- Location of Plymouth (Ply) in Merthyr Tydfil County Borough
- Population: 4,326 (2011)
- Principal area: Merthyr Tydfil
- Preserved county: Mid Glamorgan
- Country: Wales
- Sovereign state: United Kingdom
- Post town: Merthyr Tydfil
- UK Parliament: Merthyr Tydfil and Aberdare
- Senedd Cymru – Welsh Parliament: Merthyr Tydfil and Rhymney

Plymouth is an electoral ward of Merthyr Tydfil, in Wales. It is coterminous with the community of Troed-y-rhiw.

== Description ==
The Plymouth ward covers the community of Troed-y-rhiw and includes the villages of Troed-y-rhiw, Pentrebach and Abercanaid.

It elects three councillors to Merthyr Tydfil County Borough Council. At the May 2017 elections the three Labour Party councillors, Gareth Lewis (967), Brent Carter (884) and Harvey Jones (860), successfully defended their seats.

Labour had previously held all three seats at the council elections in 1995, 1999 and 2004. At the 2008 elections two Liberal Democrat councillors and one previously Labour councillor standing as an Independent were elected. At the 2012 elections the ward returned to the Labour Party.

In 2015 one of the Labour councillors for the ward, Brent Carter (who had originally been elected as a Liberal Democrat in 2008) was discovered at a Merthyr Tydfil brothel during a police raid, though did not face any charges. A complaint about the councillor was referred to the Public Services Ombudsman.
