= Penydarren =

Community in Merthyr Tydfil, Wales

- Location within Merthyr Tydfil
- Population: 5,419 (2011)
- OS grid reference: SO055075
- Principal area: Merthyr Tydfil
- Preserved county: Mid Glamorgan
- Country: Wales
- Sovereign state: United Kingdom
- Post town: MERTHYR TYDFIL
- Postcode district: CF47
- Dialling code: 01685
- Police: South Wales
- Fire: South Wales
- Ambulance: Welsh
- UK Parliament: Merthyr Tydfil and Aberdare
- Senedd Cymru – Welsh Parliament: Merthyr Tydfil and Rhymney
- List of places UK Wales Merthyr Tydfil 51.7581°N 3.3705°W Map of the community

For Trevithick's Pen-y-darren locomotive, see Richard Trevithick.

Penydarren is a community and electoral ward in Merthyr Tydfil County Borough in Wales.

== Description ==
The area is most notable for being the site of a 1st-century Roman fort. During the Industrial Revolution it housed Penydarren Ironworks, the third largest of the great Merthyr works. Penydarren was also used by Richard Trevithick as the location for his experiments into steam locomotion. The community and ward has a population of 5,253, increasing to 5,419 at the 2011 Census.

Penydarren Park, the site of the Roman fort and the football ground, is today outside the community boundary.

== Roman fort ==
Its location on a spur of land 700 feet (210 m) above sea level, just southwest of the River Taff, made Pen-y-Darren an ideal location to build an occupation outpost fort for the Romans in AD 75, during the governorship of Sextus Julius Frontinus. It was during this period that he subdued the Silures and other hostile tribes of Wales by establishing a new base at Isca Augusta for Legio II Augusta, and this was one of a network of smaller forts 15–20 kilometres (9.3–12.4 mi) apart for his auxiliary units.

The only information known about the fort is from the later excavations undertaken during the construction of the football stadium in 1905 by Frank Treharne-James, and in 1957 during the demolition of Penydarren House.

From the combination of these works, it is presently estimated that the fort had a turf and clay rampart 8.2 metres (27 ft) wide, set on a cobble foundation and separated by a narrow berm of 0.6 metres (2 ft 0 in) wide from its double ditch. The inner ditch was 0.4 metres (1 ft 4 in) wide, the outer 0.3 metres (1 ft 0 in) wide, separated by a berm of 2.5 metres (8 ft 2 in). If a well recorded by Treharne-James in 1905 was centrally placed within the principia, and a square outline is assumed, then the fort had dimensions of 152 metres (499 ft) across the rampart crests, covering an area of 2.3 hectares (5.7 acres).

Flavian pottery confirms the origin of the fort as a wooden structure, replaced in stone around AD 100, with the bath house located outside the fort's southern defences contemporary with the rebuilding. The latest pottery recovered is Trajanic, confirming that the site was abandoned in the Hadrianic period, with its garrison, moved to a new build fort at Gelligaer.

== Penydarren House ==
After Samuel Homfray came to South Wales, and establishing the Penydarren Ironworks, he won a bet with Richard Crawshay, and with the proceeds built Penydarren House in 1786 on the site of the Roman fort. It was during the construction that workmen first found Roman bricks and the remains of a tessellated pavement. Developed on a site opposite the works, but "sufficiently removed from the town by the extent of the pleasure grounds, and contains all the conveniences and the luxuries requisite for a family of wealth and importance," Homfray was waited on by servants who were dressed in a scarlet and buff livery, while he was driven everywhere in a coach and four horses.

In 1800, Homfray married Jane Morgan, daughter of Sir Charles Morgan, 1st Baronet of Tredegar House, and thus obtained a favorable lease of mineral land at Tredegar, where he established the Tredegar Ironworks. In 1813 he was appointed High Sheriff of Monmouthshire and in 1818, returned as Member of Parliament for Stafford borough.

Penydarren House was requisitioned by the UK Government at the start of World War II, it was handed over to the Ministry of Works in 1943. The house was demolished in 1957, and after a period of archaeological excavation of the Roman fort, the site was redeveloped as the present day housing community.

== The "Pen-y-Darren" locomotive ==
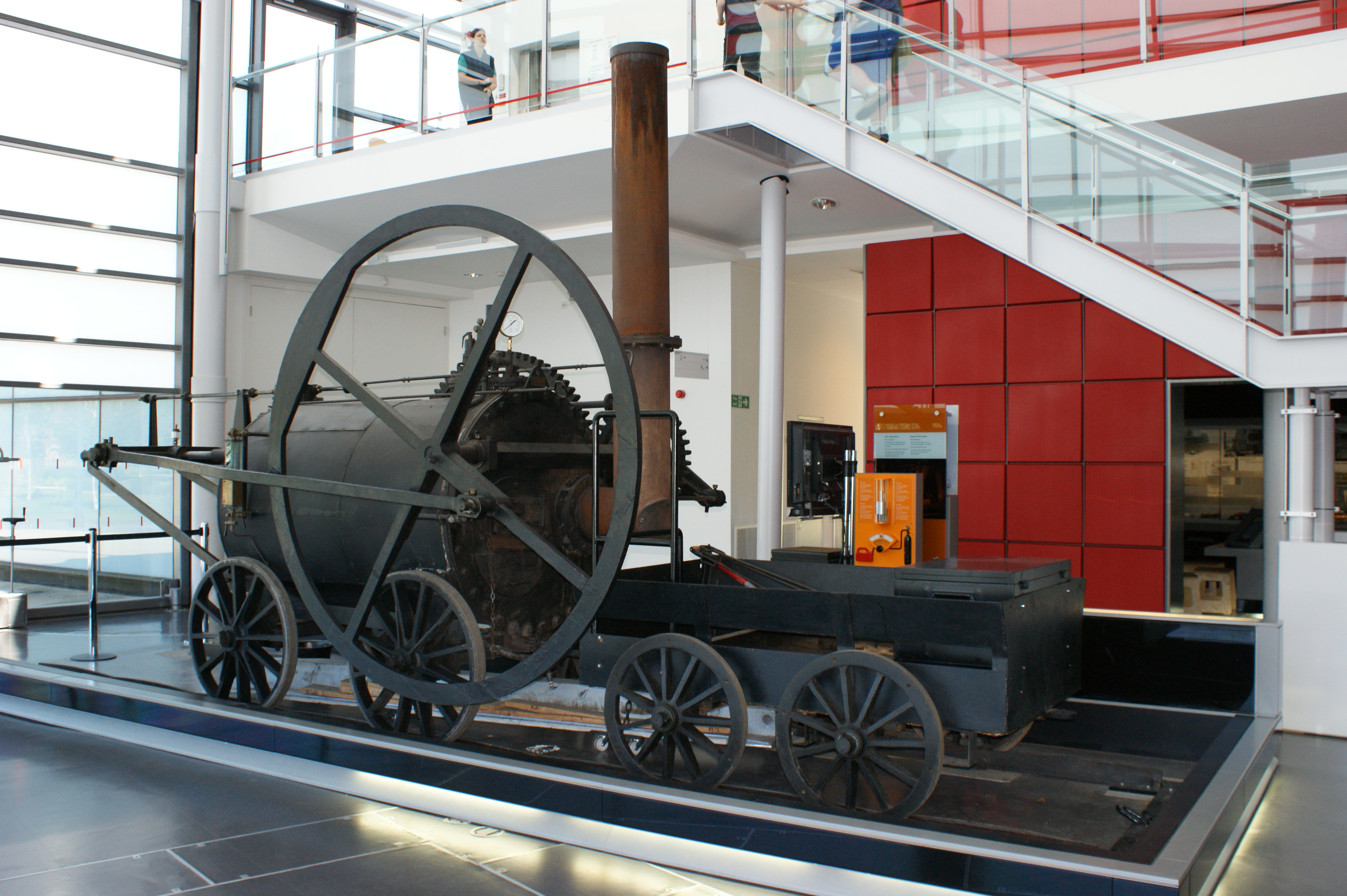
Full-scale replica of Trevithick's 1804 steam-powered railway locomotive in the National Waterfront Museum, Swansea.

"Pen-y-Darren Locomotive"
Type and origin
- Power type: Steam
- Builder: Richard Trevithick
- Build date: 1803
Specifications
- Configuration
  - Whyte: 0-4-0
Career
- Operators: Merthyr Tydfil Tramroad

In 1802, Homfray commissioned engineer Richard Trevithick to build one of his high-pressure steam engines to drive a hammer at the Penydarren Ironworks. With the assistance of works engineer Rees Jones, Trevithick mounted the engine on wheels and turned it into a locomotive. In 1803, Trevithick sold the patents for his locomotives to Homfray.

Homfray was so impressed with Trevithick's locomotive that he made another bet with Crawshay, this time for 500 guineas (£525), that Trevithick's steam locomotive could haul 10 tons of iron along the Merthyr Tydfil Tramroad from Penydarren (51°45′03″N 3°22′33″W) to Abercynon (51°38′44″N 3°19′27″W), a distance of 9 3/4 miles (15.7 km). Amid great interest from the public, on 21 February 1804 it successfully carried 11.24 tons of coal, five wagons and 70 men over the full distance, in 4 hours and 5 minutes, at an average speed of 2.4 mph (3.9 km/h). As well as Homfray, Crawshay, and the passengers, other witnesses included Mr. Giddy, a respected patron of Trevithick, and an 'engineer from the Government'. The latter was probably a safety inspector, who would have been particularly interested in the boiler's ability to withstand high steam pressures.

In modern Merthyr, behind the monument to Trevithick's locomotive, is a stone wall, which is the sole remainder of the former boundary wall of Penydarren House.

== 1811–1856: Merthyr Rising ==
The Penydarren Ironworks had been financed by William Forman of the Tower of London, who provided all the capital, partly on mortgage but also by taking shares himself. Samuel Homfray left the business in 1813, selling both the house and his shares in the Penydarren Ironworks to Foreman.

The house played a key role in the Merthyr Rising. On 2 June 1831, while local employers and magistrates were holding a meeting with the High Sheriff of Glamorgan at the Castle Inn, a group led by Lewsyn yr Heliwr (also known as Lewis Lewis) marched there to demand a reduction in the price of bread and an increase in their wages. The demands were rejected, and after being advised to return to their homes, attacked the inn. Engaged by the 93rd (Highland) Regiment, after the rioters seized some of their weapons, the troops were commanded to open fire. After a protracted struggle in which hundreds sustained an injury, some fatal, the Highlanders were compelled to withdraw to Penydarren House and abandon the town to the rioters. For eight days, Penydarren House was the sole refuge of authority in the district.

== Development and the James family ==
Forman offered the works for sale in 1859, and the Dowlais Iron Company bought the mineral ground. Foreman subsequently sold the house and its estate to the James family. While the site of the Ironworks was left to decay, eventually becoming the service depot of the Merthyr tramway, from 1870, parts of the estate were sold off for housing development.

For the period 1876 to 1888, the family leased the house out to the Merthyr Proprietary School. In the 1890s, developments included the general hospital, the Roman Catholic Church of St. Mary's, and the imposing Park Terrace and nearby large villas.

The filling in of the former fish pond marked at Bryant's Field allowed the development of Penydarren Park between 1902 and 1905, during which additional excavation of the Roman fort was undertaken by Frank Treharne-James. This also allowed the development of the terraces along Gwaelod-y-Garth lane, including Stuart, Cromwell, and Tudor.

By 1910, the Edwardian Baroque YMCA and the Masonic Temple had been completed, and post World War I Penydarren had become Merthyr Tydfil's premier middle-class suburb, with the addition of further terraces north and south of Dane Street, and properties along the Grove.

== Electoral ward ==
Penydarren was an electoral ward to Mid Glamorgan County Council from 1973 to 1996.

Penydarren has subsequently become an electoral ward (coterminous with the community) to Merthyr Tydfil County Borough Council. It elects three county councillors. At the May 2017 elections two Independent candidates (Kevin Gibbs and Chris Davies) and one Labour Party candidate (David Isaac) came top of the poll. Kevin Gibbs is now a labour councillor.
