= Gurnos =

Coordinates: 51°45′32″N 3°22′52″W

- Community
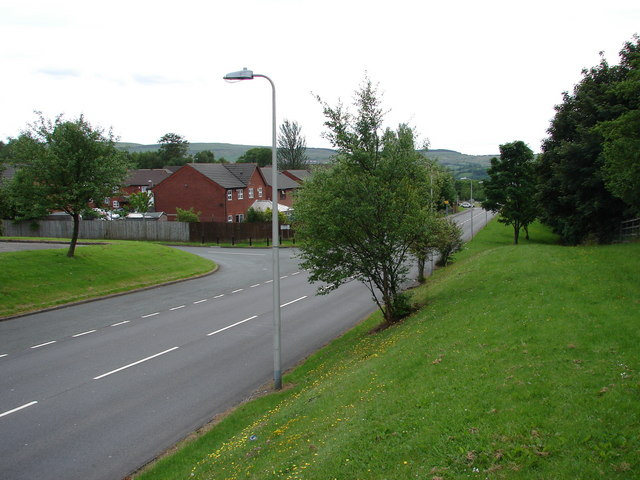
- The A465 road embankment at the north end of the Gurnos estate

- Location within Merthyr Tydfil
- Principal area: Merthyr Tydfil
- Country: Wales
- Sovereign state: United Kingdom
- Police: South Wales
- Fire: South Wales
- Ambulance: Welsh
- List of places UK Wales Merthyr Tydfil Map of the community

Gurnos is a community of Merthyr Tydfil County Borough in Wales, United Kingdom. It consists principally of the Gurnos Estate. The population in 2011 was 5,280.

== Background ==
The Gurnos Estate is a large housing estate established by Merthyr Tydfil Council in the early 1950s and expanded over many years. Many of the initial streets were named after trees; such as Oak, Acacia and Rowan. A major expansion took place during the 1970s, including the building of Prince Charles Hospital. Streets on 1970s development were named after flowers and shrubs; such as Lavender, Heather, Lupin and Forsythia, with the exception of the three most recent areas known as Pen-Gurnos, Pen-y-Dre and Pen-y-Fan View. The area built since the 1970s is still often referred to locally as The New Estate. The community population at the 2011 census was 5,280.

The area was formerly open land, including the long-established Gurnos Farm. It also encompassed the notoriously dangerous Goitre Pond.

The design and planning of the Gurnos estate borrows ideas from the Radburn system. The estate has become notorious throughout Wales, with the reputation of being an area of deprivation and crime.

The Gurnos Tavern, one of the two community centres and many of the maisonette flats were demolished to make greener areas during the late 1990s.

== Amenities ==
The Gurnos estate includes a main small shopping centre at Chestnut Way ("The Gurnos Shops"), a social club, and a community centre. The Clover Road Stores are a small shopping section on Clover Road.

In 1999 the 3Gs Development Trust was established to work with the communities of the Gurnos and Galon Uchaf, offering support, information and developmental activities. The trust's offices are based at The Gurnos Shops, together with other centres including a youth centre at Forsythia Close. The name 3Gs illustrates the local perception that there are two estates, separated by Prince Charles Hospital; the "Old Gurnos" and the "New Estate"; being two of the Gs, together with Galon Uchaf being the third. Penydarren was later added to the 3Gs remit and by 2013 the organisation's remit was expanded to include other wards as the Communities First North Cluster.

The only secondary school in the area is Pen-Y-Dre High School, there are also two primary schools; Goetre Primary School and St Aloysius Roman Catholic Primary School.

There were two pubs, the Gurnos Tavern and later The Matchstick Man, named after late boxer Johnny Owen, however both have since closed.

== People ==
Notable people associated with Gurnos include:

- Richard Harrington, actor, who was born there
