= Park, Merthyr Tydfil =

Park: Welsh: Y Parc
- Location within Merthyr Tydfil
- Population: 4,326 (2011)
- OS grid reference: SO041072
- Principal area: Merthyr Tydfil
- Preserved county: Mid Glamorgan
- Country: Wales
- Sovereign state: United Kingdom
- Post town: MERTHYR TYDFIL
- Postcode district: CF47
- Postcode district: CF48
- Dialling code: 01685
- Police: South Wales
- Fire: South Wales
- Ambulance: Welsh
- UK Parliament: Merthyr Tydfil and Aberdare
- Senedd Cymru – Welsh Parliament: Merthyr Tydfil and Rhymney
- List of places UK Wales Merthyr Tydfil 51.7555°N 3.3896°W Map of the community

Park (Welsh: Y Parc) is a community and electoral ward of the county borough of Merthyr Tydfil, in Wales.

== Community ==
The community covers an area north of Merthyr Tydfil town centre, including Cyfarthfa Park and the residential areas of Abermorlais, Georgetown, Williamstown and The Quar. At the 2001 census, it had a population of 4307, increasing to 4,326 at the 2011 census.

Park has several notable landmarks, but its most notable is Cyfarthfa Castle, which dominates the community.

== Electoral ward ==
Prior to April 1974 Park was an electoral ward to the pre-1974 Merthyr Tydfil County Borough Council. In May 1972 Plaid Cymru's Dafydd Wigley achieved a shock win in the ward, pushing the sitting Labour councillor into third place.

From 1973 to 1996 Park was a ward to Merthyr Tydfil District Council. From 1989 till 1996 Park was an electoral ward to Mid Glamorgan County Council, electing one county councillor. It also included neighbouring Vaynor.

Subsequently, the Park county ward has been coterminous with the Park community and had elected three councillors to Merthyr Tydfil County Borough Council. At the May 2017 elections the council leader and Labour Party representative, Brendan Toomey, who had represented Park for 18 years, lost his seat to an independent candidate, Tanya Skinner. The other two seats were retained by Labour's Chris Barry and Clive Jones, in what Toomey described as a safe Labour ward. Labour had previously held all three seats in the ward since 1995.
