= Registered historic parks and gardens in Merthyr Tydfil County Borough =

List of buildings in county borough of Wales

Merthyr Tydfil County Borough shown within Wales

Merthyr Tydfil County Borough is located in the historic county of Glamorgan in Wales and takes its name from its largest town. The county borough covers an area of 111 km^{2} (43 sq mi) and had a population of approximately 58,900 in 2021. There are three sites on the register of parks and gardens in Merthyr Tydfil County Borough. Two are listed at Grade II*, and one is Grade II.

The Cadw/ICOMOS Register of Parks and Gardens of Special Historic Interest in Wales was established in 2002 and given statutory status in 2022. It is administered by Cadw, the historic environment agency of the Welsh Government. Elisabeth Whittle described Cadw as having a "somewhat special and guiding role" in the preservation of historic parks and gardens, since they are "an integral part of Welsh archaeological and architectural heritage". The register includes just under 400 sites, ranging from gardens of private houses, to cemeteries and public parks. Parks and gardens are listed at one of three grades, matching the grading system used for listed buildings. Grade I is the highest grade, for sites of exceptional interest; Grade II*, the next highest, denotes parks and gardens of great quality; while Grade II denotes sites of special interest.

At the beginning of the 19th century Merthyr Tydfil was the largest town in Glamorgan. The previous fifty years had seen the establishment of four major ironworks in the area, Dowlais, Plymouth, Cyfarthfa and Penydarren, and the registered sites are all associated with of the impact that this industrial development had on the region. The oldest of the registered sites is Cyfarthfa Castle which dates from 1825. Before becoming a public park in 1910 it was the estate of the Crawshay family whose ironworks it overlooked. In the early 19th century, Cyfarthfa, with around 1,500 workers, was the largest ironworks in the world. By the middle of the century it had been overtaken by Dowlais which employed over 7,000 workers. In 1851, the population of the town of Merthyr Tydfil had grown to 46,000, twice that of Cardiff or Swansea, leading to the creation of a public cemetery in 1859 to the north-west of the town near the village of Cefn-coed-y-cymmer. It is registered together with the adjacent Jewish burial ground established to serve the communities of mainly Polish, Romanian and Russian Jews that were drawn to the region by the mining and iron industries. In 1875, when coal consumption at Dowlais averaged around 3,000 tons a day, the Merthyr Vale Colliery approximately 4 miles (6.4 km) south of Merthyr Tydfil first began to produce coal. In the 1910s, when the colliery ran out of space on the valley floor, it started tipping waste on the mountainside above the village of Aberfan. This eventually led to the disaster in 1966 when the catastrophic collapse of a spoil tip resulted in 144 deaths. The site of the tip and the slide area has been landscaped and is registered together with the Garden of Remembrance and Aberfan Cemetery.

== Key ==
Grade	Criteria
I	Parks and gardens of exceptional interest
II*	Parks and gardens of great quality
II	Parks and gardens of special interest

== List of parks and gardens ==
List of parks and gardens
Name	Location Grid Ref. (Note: Sometimes known as OSGB36, the grid reference is based on the British national grid reference system used by the Ordnance Survey.) Geo-coordinates	Date Listed	Description / Notes	Grade	Reference Number	Image
Aberfan: Cemetery, Garden of Remembrance and Former Tip and Slide Area	Aberfan; SO0593900963; 51°41′57″N 3°21′40″W	1 February 2022	Cemetery, community garden and former coalworks On 21 October 1966, 144 people, including 116 children, were killed when a coal tip above Aberfan collapsed. The cemetery, which dates from the late 19th century, has a section where 106 of the victims are buried. The memorial garden was created in 1969 on the site of Pantglas School which was mostly destroyed in the disaster. The area of the tip and its slide path have been landscaped with the aim of ensuring good drainage and stability.	II*	PGW(Gm)69(MER)	an aerial view of Aberfan Cemetery
Cefn Coed Cemetery & Jewish Burial Ground	Cefn-coed-y-cymmer; SO0244108421; 51°45′56″N 3°24′50″W	1 February 2022	Cemetery Located between the A470 and the A4054 roads, Cefn Coed Cemetery covers about 40 acres (16 ha). It was opened in 1859 and expanded in 1905, 1982 and 1994. On the opposite (east) side of the A4054 is the Jewish Burial Ground which opened in the 1860s and is one of the largest in south Wales.	II	PGW(Gm)70(MER)	Small stone building at cemetery entrance
Cyfarthfa Castle	Park; SO0418907472; 51°45′26″N 3°23′18″W	1 February 2022	Public park In 1825 ironmaster William Crawshay II had a large mansion built overlooking the Taff Valley and the Cyfarthfa Ironworks. At the time there was a natural landscape around the house but by the 1870s it had been developed into a formal garden and Victorian parkland that is now present. In 1909 Cyfartha Castle was sold to the Merthyr Corporation and the grounds became a public park the following year.	II*	PGW(Gm)1(MER)	A castle in the distance viewed between trees on a lawn sloping down to a lake in the foreground.

== See also ==
- List of scheduled monuments in Merthyr Tydfil County Borough
- Grade I listed buildings in Merthyr Tydfil County Borough
- Grade II* listed buildings in Merthyr Tydfil County Borough
