= Grade II* listed buildings in Merthyr Tydfil County Borough =

List of buildings in county borough of Wales

Merthyr Tydfil County Borough shown within Wales

Merthyr Tydfil County Borough is located in the historic county of Glamorgan in Wales and takes its name from its largest town. The county borough covers an area of 111 km^{2} (43 sq mi) and had a population of approximately 58,900 in 2021. There are ten structures on the list of twelve Grade II* listed buildings in Merthyr Tydfil. Two viaducts constructed as part of the Brecon and Merthyr Railway both straddle the borders of neighbouring communities so have separate designations for each of these locations.

In the United Kingdom, the term listed building refers to a building or other structure officially designated as being of special architectural, historical, or cultural significance. Listing was begun by a provision in the Town and Country Planning Act 1947. Once a building is listed, strict limitations are imposed on the modifications allowed to its structure or fittings and alterations require listed building consent. In Wales, authority for listing or delisting, under the Planning (Listed Buildings and Conservation Areas) Act 1990, rests with the Welsh Ministers, though these decisions are based on the recommendations of Cadw. There are around 30,000 listed buildings in Wales and these are categorised into three grades: Grade I (one), II* (two star) and II (two). Grade II* denotes "particularly important buildings of more than special interest" and makes up about seven per cent of the total number of listed buildings in Wales.

At the beginning of the 19th century Merthyr Tydfil was the largest town in Glamorgan. The previous fifty years had seen the establishment of four major ironworks in the area, Dowlais, Plymouth, Cyfarthfa and Penydarren, and the Grade II* listed architecture of the region reflects the growth of this industry and transport network associated with it. The oldest structure, a bridge built in 1793, had a dual purpose as it carried a tramway and aqueducts powering the Cyfarthfa Ironworks. The growth of iron foundries in Merthyr Tydfil led to the building of the Glamorganshire Canal (1791–1795) connecting the industry to the docks at Cardiff. Within a decade the Merthyr Tramroad, a 15.3 km (9.5 miles) route linking the Dowlais and Penydarren works to Abercynon, was built to bypass the upper section of the canal. Near Quakers Yard there are two Grade II* listed bridges (built 1815) that were part of the tramway and a viaduct, which passes over it, was built in 1841 as part of the Taff Vale Railway. The two viaducts of the Brecon and Merthyr Railway, built 1866, were designed by Henry Conybeare and Alexander Sutherland. Robert Crawshay of the Cyfarthfa Ironworks was a friend of Sutherland and the Crawshay Estate laid down conditions for the design of the Cefn viaduct, with the Taff Valley being overlooked by Cyfarthfa Castle. There are two Grade II* listed engine houses in the county, one built in 1836 at the Ynysfach Ironworks (operated as part of the Cyfarthfa complex), and the other in the early 20th century at the Dowlais Ironworks. In the first half of the 19th century Cyfarthfa was surpassed by Dowlais as the largest ironworks in the world. The only Grade II* listed building that was originally for recreational use, the former Guest Memorial Library, was built to commemorate the owner of the Dowlais Ironworks during this period, John Josiah Guest, who died in 1852. At this time the population of the town of Merthyr Tydfil was 46,000, twice that of Cardiff or Swansea, however it was not until 1894 that an urban district council was established. The Town Hall (1896–98) built as an expression of the civic pride of attaining urban status rapidly became the centre of civic and political focus in the town.

== Buildings ==
List of buildings
Name	Location Grid Ref. (Note: Sometimes known as OSGB36, the grid reference is based on the British national grid reference system used by the Ordnance Survey.) Geo-coordinates	Date Listed	Notes	Reference Number	Image
Cefn Railway Viaduct	Cyfarthfa; SO0304907597; 51°45′31″N 3°24′22″W	7 November 1951	Viaduct A dual-listed (see also 11382) structure built in 1866 to carry the Brecon and Merthyr Railway over the Taf Fawr. It was designed by Henry Conybeare and Alexander Sutherland at a cost of £25,000 (equivalent to £2,925,000 in 2023). The fifteen arches of the 36.6 m (120 ft) high viaduct follow a gentle curve of 235 m (771 ft).	11377	See more images
Cefn Railway Viaduct	Vaynor; SO0304007795; 51°45′38″N 3°24′23″W	7 November 1951	Viaduct A dual-listed (see also 11377) structure built in 1866 to carry the Brecon and Merthyr Railway over the Taf Fawr. The viaduct has tall, slender limestone piers, a material originally intended to be used throughout, however, the arches were completed using a contrasting red brick due to a trade union strike by stonemasons.	11382	See more images
Pont-y-Cafnau	Park; SO0376507138; 51°45′17″N 3°23′44″W	22 August 1975	Bridge An ironwork bridge spanning the River Taff constructed in 1793. The name, meaning "bridge of troughs", comes from its unusual three tier design of a tramroad between two watercourses, one beneath the bridge deck and the other on an upper wooden structure which is no longer present. Pont-y-Cafnau is also designated as a scheduled monument.	11408	See more images
Town Hall	Town; SO0489306371; 51°44′51″N 3°22′40″W	22 August 1975	Town hall A Large municipal building designed by Edwin Arthur Johnson in the early Renaissance style and built 1896–98 by Harry Gibbon. Built of red Cattybrook brick with orange terracotta dressings on a base of Pennant Sandstone. Following restoration work it became the Red House, an arts centre, in 2014.	11444	See more images
Pontsarn Railway Viaduct	Pant; SO0454309921; 51°46′47″N 3°23′06″W	22 August 1975	Viaduct A dual-listed (see also 81196) structure built in 1866 to carry the Brecon and Merthyr Railway over the Taf Fechan. It was designed by Henry Conybeare and Alexander Sutherland. The viaduct is 28 m (92 ft) high and 128 m (420 ft) long.	11484	See more images
Former Guest Memorial Library	Dowlais; SO0699107880; 51°45′43″N 3°20′57″W	22 August 1975	Library A two-storey cruciform building of 1855–1863 built as a memorial to John Josiah Guest of the Dowlais Ironworks. The Dowlais workmen intended for the library and reading room to be funded by subscription, but rising costs led to the building being completed by the company at a total cost of £7,000 (equivalent to £846,000 in 2023).	11490	See more images
Dowlais Works Blast Engine House	Dowlais; SO0690907739; 51°45′38″N 3°21′01″W	22 August 1975	Engine house A 54 m (177 ft) long and 15 m (49 ft) high red brick industrial building constructed in 1905–07 to house three blowing engines as part of the Dowlais Ironworks. The works went into decline in the 1930s and in the late 20th century the building was being used by a chocolate company.	11491	See more images
Quakers Yard Railway Viaduct	Treharris; ST0885396473; 51°39′35″N 3°19′09″W	1 April 1988	Viaduct A tall stone-built viaduct with six arches that spans both the River Taff and the Merthyr Tramroad. It was constructed 1840–41 by Isambard Kingdom Brunel as part of the Taff Vale Railway and widened by 1861.	11514	See more images
Ynysfach Engine House	Cyfarthfa; SO0452406096; 51°44′44″N 3°23′04″W	5 November 1995	Engine house Built in 1836 as part of the Ynysfach Ironworks, it originally housed an engine made at the Neath Abbey Ironworks. This four-storey building of blue Pennant Sandstone with white ashlar dressings fell into disuse when the Ynysfach works closed in 1874. In the 1980s It was restored and became a museum.	16073	Upload Photo
Greenfield Bridge, Penydarren Tramroad	Treharris; ST0902496544; 51°39′37″N 3°19′00″W	20 February 2003	Bridge A single arch Pennant Sandstone structure built to replace an earlier wooden bridge that collapsed in 1815 when a train was passing over it. The semi-circular arch has span of 19.2 m (63 ft) at a height of 8.4 m (28 ft) above the river. It is part of the Merthyr Tramroad scheduled monument.	80907	Upload Photo
Victoria Bridge, Penydarren Tramroad	Treharris; ST0942396281; 51°39′29″N 3°18′39″W	20 February 2003	Bridge A single high-arch bridge over the River Taff similar in design to the nearby Greenfield bridge. Built in 1815 to replace a wooden bridge of 1800–02 it was originally as part of the Merthyr Tramway but is now a footbridge. It is part of the Merthyr Tramroad scheduled monument.	80910	Upload Photo
Pontsarn Railway Viaduct	Vaynor; SO0453409918; 51°46′47″N 3°23′07″W	22 August 1975	Viaduct A dual-listed (see also 11484) structure built in 1866 to carry the Brecon and Merthyr Railway over the Taf Fechan. It is constructed of limestone and has tall, slender piers with segmental arches. The Cadw description has seven arches, Newman has eight.	81196	See more images

== See also ==
- List of Scheduled Monuments in Merthyr Tydfil
- Grade I listed buildings in Merthyr Tydfil County Borough
- Registered historic parks and gardens in Merthyr Tydfil County Borough
