= William Wood (ironmaster) =

British ironmaster and mintmaster

William Wood (1671–1730) was an English hardware manufacturer, ironmaster, and mintmaster, notorious for receiving a contract to strike an issue of Irish coinage from 1722 to 1724. He also struck the 'Rosa Americana' coins of British America during the same period. Wood's coinage was extremely unpopular in Ireland, occasioning controversy as to its constitutionality and economic sense, notably in Jonathan Swift's Drapier's Letters. The coinage was recalled and exported to the colonies of British America. Subsequently, Wood developed a novel but ineffective means of producing iron, which he exploited as part of a fraudulent investment scheme.

== Family life ==
William Wood was born in Wolverhampton, son of Francis Wood, a silkweaver. His family were not supposedly descendants of Huguenots named Dubois who had fled France after the St. Bartholomew’s Day Massacre in 1572.

William married Margaret Molineaux in 1690, daughter of Willenhall ironmonger Richard Molineaux. The couple lived in a large house in Wolverhampton, The Deanery, where they raised 14 children.

== Career ==
=== Ironmonger ===
After his marriage William Wood entered into a partnership as a manufacturing ironmonger in Wolverhampton with his father-in-law, Richard Molyneux. Later in 1723 his two brothers-in-law, the Dublin ironmongers John and Daniel Molyneux, disclaimed all connection with the coinage of William Wood. However, little is known of his trade.

=== Ironmaster ===
In 1715, William Wood 'took two important steps away from his prosperous anonymity and down a road which led eventually to infamy and ruin. The first was his application for the receiver-generalship of the land tax for the neighbouring county of Shropshire, and the second his formation of a large partnership for the production and marketing of iron and steel in the Midlands and London.' Effectively he was attempting to profit from the crushing Whig victory in 1714.

In 1714, he had entered into a partnership with Thomas Harvey and others at Tern Mill, a brass and iron mill close to Tern Hall (now Attingham Park), with the intention of obtaining further ironworks. They built Sutton Forge, at Sutton by Shrewsbury, and with Charles Lloyd of Dolobran, Bersham Furnace. They also had for a time furnace at Esclusham Above and Ruabon. In 1717, he became a partner in building a blast furnace at Rushall, where there was at least an intention to use coke as fuel, then a comparatively novel idea.

In 1720, Wood issued a prospectus for erecting 'a company for manufacturing iron copper brass etc.', The Present State of Mr Wood's Partnership. He probably hoped to profit from share dealing. Harvey wanted to buy Wood's shares and have his own business back. Wood offered to buy Harvey's, but did not offer enough. Harvey accepted shares in the new company. He also agreed to sell his potwork at Gardden at Rhosllannerchrugog and shares in the White Grit and Penally lead mines on the Stiperstones for £17100. By 1723, Wood also had the Falcon Iron Foundry at Southwark, where he placed his son William in charge.

Harvey went unpaid for several years and had to seek help from his fellow Quaker Joshua Gee, whose son Joshua married Harvey's daughter, leading to litigation against William Wood, his sons William and Francis and son-in-law William Buckland (as guarantors). This ultimately led to several ironworks being returned to Harvey. Wood's share of Ruabon Furnace was purportedly transferred to Daniel Ivie in satisfaction for the non-delivery of iron. He broke into the house at Gardden, occupied by John Hawkins the clerk there, and had to be removed by a constable, but Hawkins (who was arrested) had to get himself removed to London by habeas corpus in 1731 to answer proceedings. Ivie seems to have operated there until 1737, while Hawkins became managing partner for a firm involving some of the Coalbrookdale ironworks partners at Bersham ironworks.

=== Wood's halfpence ===
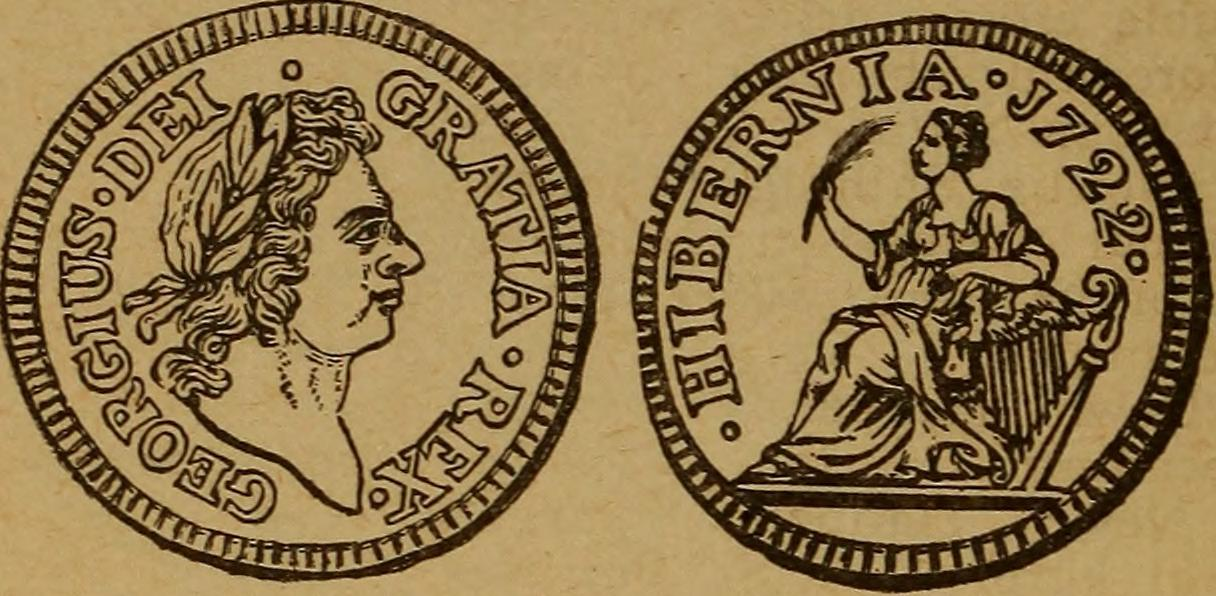
Wood's Irish halfpence coin, obverse and reverse.

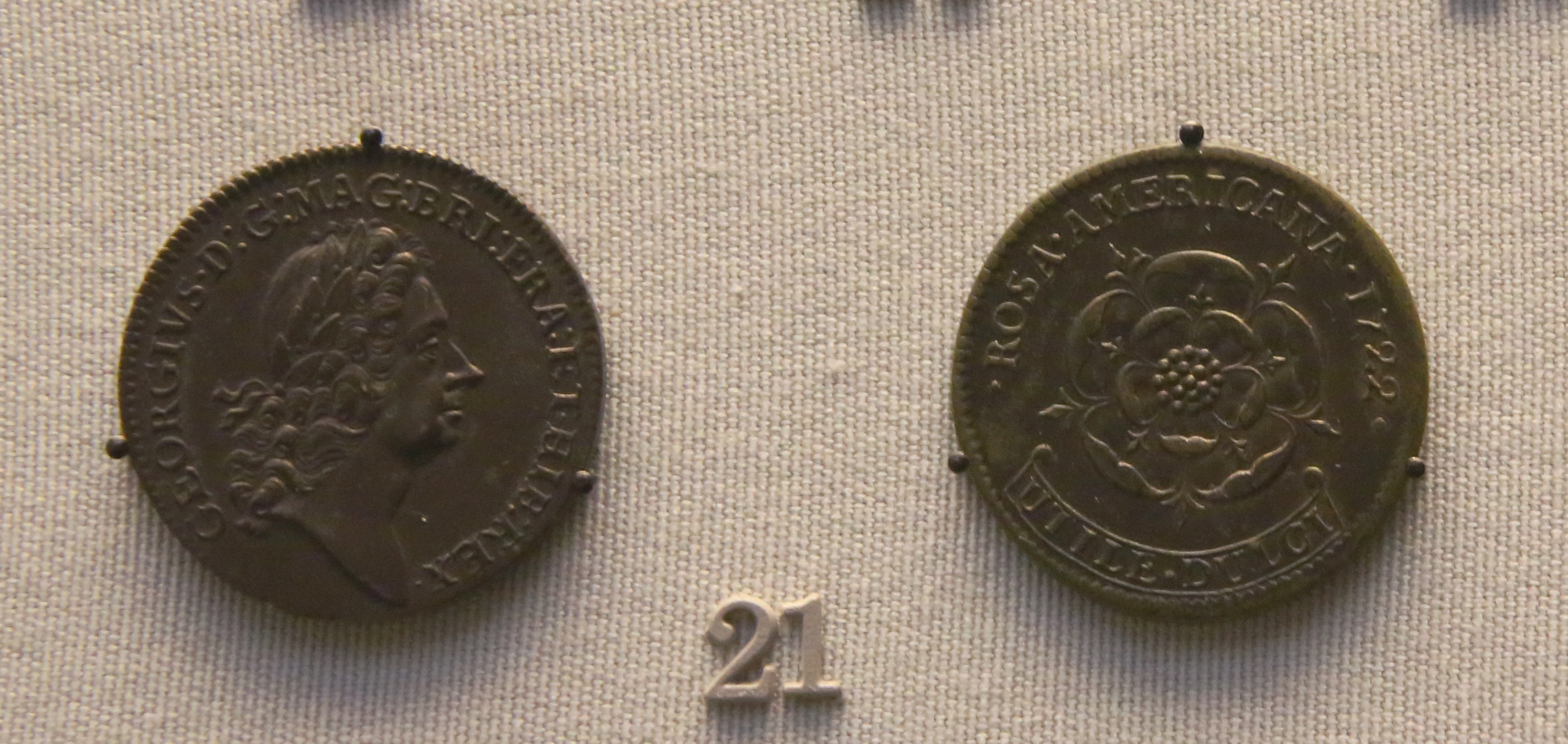
'Rosa Americana' halfpence, struck for circulation in the Thirteen Colonies

Wood hoped to make a profit producing coins for use in Ireland and America. During the first half of 1722 the king's mistress, the Duchess of Kendal, obtained a patent from the Earl of Sunderland for coining copper money for Ireland. This was a means of providing her with something to live on after the death of the king. Wood thought this would be a profitable enterprise so he purchased the royal patent from the duchess for £10,000. In his indenture from George I dated 16 June 1722, Wood was authorized to produce up to 360 tons of halfpence and farthings for Ireland at 30 pence to the pound over a period of fourteen years for an annual fee of £800 paid to the king. These Hibernia coins, which were minted in Phoenix Street, Seven Dials, London, from January 1722, were heavier than the coppers then circulating in Ireland. They were certainly less profitable for Wood to mint than his lighter weight Rosa Americana issues (Hibernias weighed sixty halfpence to the pound as compared to 120 Rosa Americana halfpence to the pound). When including the costs of production and the £10,000 fee paid to the Duchess of Kendal, P. Mossman has calculated Wood would have lost £4,871 over the fourteen years of the patent. Thus from Wood's standpoint the Hibernia coin specifications were too generous based on the cost of production, fuelling speculation that Wood intended to make good his shortfall by debasing or even counterfeiting his own coins.

Wood's coinage was extremely unpopular in Ireland. The Anglican archbishop of Dublin, William King, was an early critic of the copper coinage scheme, arguing as early as July 1722 that its introduction would lead to an outflow of gold and silver coins from the kingdom. The Commissioners of the Irish Revenue similarly argued that there was no shortage of halfpence and farthings in Ireland, and a large influx of copper coins would be prejudicial to the country's commerce and the royal revenue. The Parliament of Ireland sent an address to the king in September 1723 protesting against the coins' introduction, citing the danger of inflation and of legal tender (gold and silver) coinage flowing out of Ireland as well as the "Clandestine and Unpresedented [sic] manner" in which Wood had obtained his patent. Open letters, ballads, pamphlets, and puppet shows denounced or mocked Wood's coinage. Jonathan Swift attacked the coinage in a widely circulated series of pseudonymous Drapier's Letters. Swift objected to the secretive way this patent had been given to a private individual in England, rather than to the Irish authorities (who were not consulted in the matter); to the officiousness of Robert Walpole in defending the patent; and to the high-handed way that the wishes of Ireland's parliament and public opinion were set aside. Swift claimed that Ireland would be defrauded of much of the silver and gold in circulation on the grounds that Wood's coins were of inferior quality and could easily be forged. The controversy was not quelled when assays carried out by Sir Isaac Newton, at that time Master of the Mint, showed that the copper in the coins he assayed "was of the same goodness and value with that which was coined for England." Irish pamphleteers, including Swift, pointed out that Wood himself had selected the coins for Newton to test and that Wood would not be able to turn a profit without debasing the coins actually bound for Ireland. The controversy turned increasingly into a larger debate about Ireland's constitutional status and the rights of the Irish Parliament and people. As a result of the popular agitation against the coins, Wood's halfpence and farthings were ultimately recalled. As compensation for the loss of his patents, Wood was granted a pension of £3000 a year for eight years, although he only received this for three years before his death on 2 August 1730.

The famed blind Irish harper Turlough O'Carolan (1670 – 25 March 1738) wrote a tongue-in-cheek celebration of this failure, titled "Squire Wood's Lamentation on the Refusal of his Halfpence".

=== Patent iron-making venture ===
While working at Lee Hall in Bellingham, Northumberland, his son Francis devised a means of making iron with mineral coal, which he patented in 1727. In 1723, Thomas Baylies on behalf of Wood had agreed an iron ore mining lease in Frizington Parks, near Whitehaven. In May 1728, he sought to exploit the patent for iron-making processes invented by his son Francis, which he re-patented himself. He financed this by contracting to supply a large quantity of iron to the United Company of Mines Royal and Mineral and Battery Works, who advanced money (or rather saleable shares) with which Wood erected works on Frizington Moor. The works were 375 feet long and 36 feet wide, with 11 furnaces, three horsemill-powered forges and engines for grinding coal and iron ore.

Wood was secretive over what was achieved. Sir John Meres of the United Company of Mines Royal (etc.) asked James Lowther of Whitehaven to find out what was happening. The reports that Lowther obtained from his agent John Spedding indicated the works were experiencing difficulty, with the result that the Company delayed instalments of what they were to advance. The company never received more than some 10 tons of Wood's iron.

Having failed to secure finance from the Mines Royal Company, Wood wanted to incorporate the "Company of Ironmasters of Great Britain", with a capital of £1,000,000, but it was feared this would prove to be a vehicle for stockjobbing. This led to an investigation by the Privy Council, at which point William Wood died. The government provided £500 to build furnaces by the high road to Chelsea, so that the promoters could demonstrate the process. Wood, two of his sons, William and Charles, his son-in-law William Buckland, and Kingsmill Eyre were the petitioners in this. A trial of the process in the presence of John Hanbury, Sir James Lowther, and the Earl of Hay took place in November 1731. The iron produced was then tried by blacksmiths in the presence of Privy Council clerks. The smiths gave the opinion that the iron required more work than common redshort iron and was weaker when cold. This adverse report was the end of efforts to have a company chartered.

Kingsmill Eyre took out a patent for a similar process in his own name in 1736. In this, scrap iron was added to the charge, which made the iron less bad. He tried to revive the Frizington works, but nothing came of this and he was declared bankrupt in May 1738.

== Posterity ==
William's son John obtained £2000 from his father for handing back a share in Francis' patent, though he had some difficulty in getting it paid. He set up Wednesbury Field Forge in 1740, where he made iron from scrap. He patented a process for making pig iron malleable in 1761 and, with this brother Charles in 1762, a similar process, the earlier form of that known as potting and stamping. This was an important advance in the conversion from pig iron to bar iron.

William’s son Charles Wood was involved in the discovery of platinum. He built Low Mill Forge, near Egremont, where he conducted experiments for the potting and stamping process, which he patented with John. He built the Cyfarthfa Iron foundry in Glamorgan, for Anthony Bacon and William Brownrigg, recording events in a diary (Gross 2001).

Francis was engaged at Ember Mill in Thames Ditton when he was declared bankrupt in October 1732, as was William Wood junior. Charles and his brother-in-law William Buckland followed in 1733.

Charles was the grandfather of the noted Victorian writer Mary Howitt. She published a history of the family, Some Reminiscences of my Life, in the journal Good Words.

William was also an ancestor of the poet Armine Kent and the architect Arthur Blomfield.

== See also ==
- Coins of British America
- Coins of Ireland
