= Richard Crawshay (fencer) =

British fencer (1882–1953)

Richard Oakes Crawshay
Personal information
- Born: 12 April 1882 Kensington, London, England
- Died: 31 January 1953 (aged 70)

Sport
- Sport: Fencing

Richard Oakes Crawshay (12 April 1882 – 31 January 1953) was a British fencer, the son of Richard Frederick Crawshay, J.P. and D.L., of Ty Mawr, Abergavenny, Brecknockshire by his wife Tempe Isabella, daughter of Colonel Edward Oakes. He was the great-grandson of William Crawshay (1788-1867), great-great-grandson of William Crawshay (1762-1834), and great-great-great grandson of Richard Crawshay, who owned the Cyfarthfa Ironworks at Merthyr Tydfil.

Crawshay was educated at Harrow. He attained the rank of Lieutenant in the Grenadier Guards. In 1907 he married Ann, the youngest daughter of Lazarus Threlfall Baines, of Westbrook, and divorced her in 1915 having had no children.

Crawshay competed in the team sabre event at the 1912 Summer Olympics.
