= Richard Crawshay =

English iron merchant

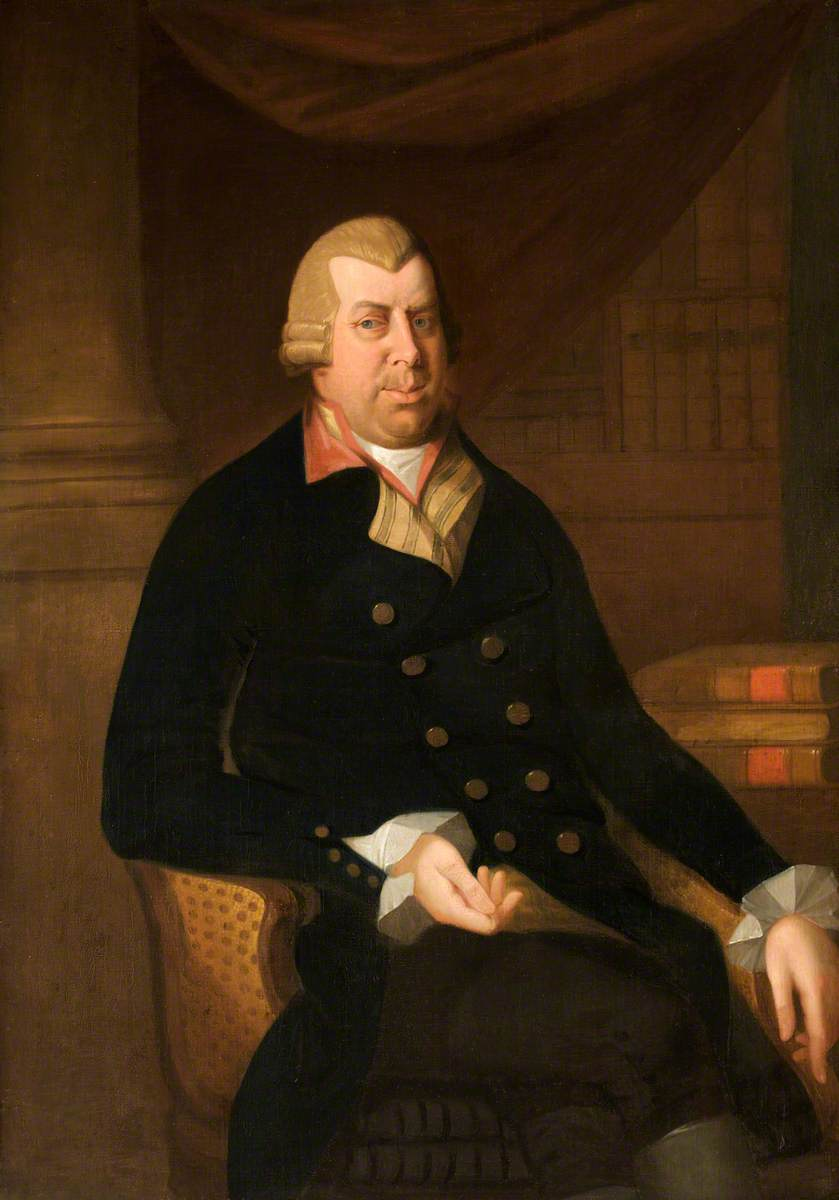
- Portrait of Richard Crawshay (18th-century) at Cyfarthfa Castle Museum & Art Gallery
- Born: 1 October 1739; Normanton, West Riding of Yorkshire, England
- Died: 27 June 1810 (aged 70)
- Resting place: Llandaff Cathedral, Cardiff, Wales
- Engineering career
- Discipline: Ironmastery

Richard Crawshay (1 October 1739 – 27 June 1810) was an English iron merchant and then South Wales ironmaster; he was one of ten known British millionaires in 1799.

== Early life and marriage ==
Richard Crawshay was born in Normanton in the West Riding of Yorkshire on 1 October 1739. Initially starting work aged 16, working for Mr Bicklewith of York Yard, Thames Street, London (to whom he was apprenticed) in a bar iron warehouse in London, he became sole proprietor of the business on Bicklewith's retirement in 1763.

On 15 June 1763, Crawshay married Mary Bourne, the daughter of Ebenezer Bourne, a London stove-grate maker. They had a son, William, and three daughters, the second of whom, Charlotte, married industrialist Benjamin Hall.

== Iron importation and ironworks proprietorship ==
By the 1770s Crawshay was a leading London iron merchant, dealing mainly in Swedish and Russian iron. The firm was Crawshay and Moser in 1774, and then Crawshay, Cornwell and Moser in 1784. The business still existed, as R & W Crawshay, in 1816. By 1775 he was acting as Anthony Bacon's agent for supplying iron cannon to the Board of Ordnance and was from 1777 a partner in that business, casting cannon at Cyfarthfa Ironworks in Merthyr Tydfil. This continued until Bacon had to give up government contracts in 1782, because he was a Member of Parliament.

In 1786, following the death of Anthony Bacon, Crawshay took over the whole Cyfarthfa Ironworks, in partnership with William Stevens (a London merchant) and James Cockshutt, who had previously managed the forge and boring mill for ironmaster David Tanner. In May 1787 he took out a licence from Henry Cort for his puddling process, but the rolling mill needed was not completed until 1789. He solved the problems of the puddling process by using an iron plate for the furnace ceiling and sea-washed sand for the floor. In 1791 he terminated the partnership, which had made little profit. He continued the business alone, and had two blast furnaces, eight puddling furnaces, three melting fineries, three balling furnaces, and a rolling mill in 1794. A blast furnace was built by 1796, and a fourth the same year. There were six furnaces by 1810. He thus developed Cyfarthfa into one of the most important ironworks in South Wales.

Crawshay was very ambitious and imperious in manner, being called 'The Tyrant' by some, but was without social pretension. He was active in protecting the interests of the iron trade and was a major promoter of the Glamorganshire Canal which immensely improved transport of iron to Cardiff Docks.

In 1799 he was the sixth wealthiest man or family in Britain (with some forerunners counted for completeness as wider family concerns), owning £2M (equivalent to £197,500,000 in 2025). He was one of ten millionaires known that year. At his death in 1810 his undivested estate was sworn at £1.5 million. By his last will he left 3/8 of his ironworks to son William Crawshay I, 3/8 to his son-in-law, Benjamin Hall and 1/4 to nephew Joseph Bailey. He was buried at Llandaff Cathedral.

== See also ==
- Cyfarthfa Castle – built by Richard's grandson, William
