= William Crawshay =

William Crawshay may refer to:

- William Crawshay I (1764–1834), South Wales industrialist
- William Crawshay II (1788–1867), son of William I, owner of Cyfarthfa Ironworks in Merthyr Tydfil
- William Thompson Crawshay (1847–1918), grandson of William II, ironmaster
