= Grade I listed buildings in Merthyr Tydfil County Borough =

List of buildings in county borough of Wales

Merthyr Tydfil County Borough shown within Wales

Merthyr Tydfil County Borough is located in the historic county of Glamorgan in Wales and takes its name from its largest town. The county borough covers an area of 111 km^{2} (43 sq mi) and had a population of approximately 58,900 in 2021.

In the United Kingdom, the term listed building refers to a building or other structure officially designated as being of special architectural, historical, or cultural significance. Listing was begun by a provision in the Town and Country Planning Act 1947. Once a building is listed, strict limitations are imposed on the modifications allowed to its structure or fittings and alterations require listed building consent. In Wales, authority for listing or delisting, under the Planning (Listed Buildings and Conservation Areas) Act 1990, rests with the Welsh Ministers, though these decisions are based on the recommendations of Cadw. There are around 30,000 listed buildings in Wales and these are categorised into three grades: Grade I (one), II* (two star) and II (two). The highest is Grade I which denotes "buildings of exceptional interest" and makes up fewer than two per cent of the total number of listed buildings in Wales.

Merthyr Tydfil County Borough has one Grade I listed building, Cyfarthfa Castle. The castle has two listing designations, dating from the time of listing when the castle was subdivided into a museum and a school.

== Buildings ==
Name	Location Grid Ref. (Note: Sometimes known as OSGB36, the grid reference is based on the British national grid reference system used by the Ordnance Survey.) Geo-coordinates	Date Listed	Function	Notes	Reference Number	Image
Cyfarthfa Castle	Park; SO0417607331; 51°45′23″N 3°23′23″W	15 July 1974	Country House	1824-5. Designed by Robert Lugar for ironmaster William Crawshay II. Situated in its own landscaped park overlooking the Taff Valley and site of the former Cyfarthfa Ironworks.	11396	See more images

== See also ==
- Grade II* listed buildings in Merthyr Tydfil County Borough
- Listed buildings in Wales
- List of Scheduled Monuments in Merthyr Tydfil
- Registered historic parks and gardens in Merthyr Tydfil County Borough
