= Kingsmill Eyre =

Kingsmill Eyre (23 May 1682–1743) was Secretary of Chelsea Hospital, a garden designer, and the patentee of a process for making iron.

== Family ==
Kingsmill was the youngest of five children of Samuel and Martha Eyre of New House, Whiteparish, Wiltshire. His elder brother was Robert Eyre, Solicitor-General in 1708–10 and then Chief Justice of the Common Pleas in 1725–35.

== Career ==
His mother was looking for a place of employment for him in 1702, and sought the help of John Locke, the philosopher. He had served eight years (including time in Holland) as an apprentice to a Mr Chitty, a merchant, supplying stores to the Navy Board. The outcome of this has not been discovered.

Somehow, Eyre entered the circle of Robert Walpole; the point of contact may have been his brother Robert. This led to Eyre's appointment as Agent to the Four Companies of Invalids of Chelsea Hospital in 1716, a post in the gift of Walpole as its treasurer. This was followed in 1718 by his appointment as Secretary to the Commissioners of Chelsea College.

In this period, Eyre was responsible for laying out the garden at Walpole's Norfolk mansion at Houghton. He may also have designed other gardens during the 1720s.

During the 1720s, Eyre became involved in the iron-making project of William Wood, whose son had obtained a patent for a method of making iron in an air furnace using mineral coal in 1727. This was followed by another to Wood himself in 1728 for something similar, but the enterprise collapsed because Wood was unable to perform what he promised. How deeply Eyre was involved is not clear, but in 1736, he took out a similar patent in his own name.

In May, 1726 he was elected a Fellow of the Royal Society.
