= Anthony Bacon (industrialist) =

English-born merchant and industrialist

Anthony Bacon (baptised 24 January 1716 – 21 January 1786) was an English-born merchant and industrialist who was significantly responsible for the emergence of Merthyr Tydfil as the iron-smelting centre of Britain.

== Background ==
Bacon was born at St Bees near Whitehaven in Cumberland, the youngest son of William Bacon, a ship's captain trading in coal from that port to Ireland. His eldest full brother was Thomas and his father also had a son William from his first marriage.

The family claimed descent from Sir Nicholas Bacon (1540–1624); however, since very little is known about his ancestry and upbringing, the connection may be spurious or illegitimate.

== Early life ==
Following the death of both his parents, William Bacon and Elizabeth Richardson, Anthony moved to Talbot County Maryland to live with his maternal uncles, tobacco merchants Thomas and Anthony Richardson. He became a merchant and mariner, expanding the business to include Virginia and the import of Spanish wine. During the Seven Years' War Bacon became a government contractor for shipping and victualling in partnership with London merchant William Biggin, also from Whitehaven.

== Career ==
In 1738, Bacon became master of the ship York, a tobacco trade vessel owned by John Hanbury. In 1740, under contract from Andrew Reid esq. and in accordance with the Transportation Act 1717 (4 Geo. 1. c. 11), Bacon used this ship to transport 115 convicted felons (women, men and children) from Newgate Prison in London to the Province of Maryland where they were sold for a 7 to 14-year penal transportation sentence.

Between 1760 and 1766, Anthony Bacon was full or partial owner of five ships that completed a total of six Atlantic slave trade voyages: the ship Sarah in 1760 to Virginia; the ship Kepple in 1760 to South Carolina; the ship Charming Molly 1762 to Maryland; the ship Two Sisters in 1763 to Maryland; and the ship King of Bonny in 1765 to Barbados & in 1766 to St. Kitts. In 1763, the ship Two Sisters was co-owned by Anthony Bacon and his nephew, Anthony Richardson Jr.

The following year, 1764, Bacon withdrew from the tobacco trade, and concentrated on trade to and contracting in new British colonies (the ceded islands—St Vincent, Tobago, Dominica, and Grenada) in the West Indies and west Africa. At the same time to aid his business in government contracts, he was elected as Member of Parliament for the venal borough of Aylesbury, which he represented until 1784, by which time the participation of MPs in government contracting had been prohibited.

In 1765 Bacon went into partnership with William Brownrigg of Whitehaven, taking out a lease on 4,000 acres (16 km^{2}) of land in the Merthyr valley. After obtaining the mineral-rich land very cheaply, they employed Charles Wood to build Cyfarthfa forge using his patented potting and stamping process to make pig iron into bar iron. This was followed by a blast furnace at Cyfarthfa, 50 feet high and opened in 1767. In 1766, Bacon took over the Plymouth Ironworks to supply pig iron to his forge. Brownrigg partnership was dissolved in 1777. Bacon leased the Hirwaun ironworks in 1780.

Bacon's government contracts included supplying ordnance. In 1773, after the Carron Company's guns had been withdrawn from service as dangerous, Bacon offered to provide three cannon for a trial, made respectively with charcoal, coke, and mixed fuel. He also delivered a fourth with then 'cast solid and bored'. This gun was reported to be 'infinitely better than [those cast] in the ordinary way, because it makes the ordnance more compact and consequently more durable', despite the greater expense. This led to a contract in 1774. These guns were apparently cast by John Wilkinson until Bacon's contract with him ended in 1776. The next year, Bacon asked for Richard Crawshay's name to be included in his warrants, and from this time the cannon were cast at Cyfarthfa. This continued until Bacon as a member of parliament was disabled from undertaking government contracts by the House of Commons (Disqualification) Act 1782 (22 Geo. 3. c. 45), when the forge and some of the gunfoundry business were leased to Francis Homfray.

== Family ==
Bacon married Elizabeth Richardson, but their only son died in 1770, aged 12. His brother Thomas also died in Maryland, and one of Thomas' daughters (Elizabeth) had sailed to England to assist Anthony's family. Bacon therefore made Elizabeth and his illegitimate sons his heirs. When he died, the sons received princely amounts for the time. Bacon's eldest son, Anthony Bushby Bacon (1772–1827) was to receive the Cyfarthfa estate when he came of age. The second son Thomas Bacon was to receive the Plymouth furnace, etc. In addition, "The Hirwaun furnace and collieries became the joint property of Anthony II and Thomas, while Robert, it seems, had the mines, etc., at Workington. Elizabeth was to receive a clear annuity of £300 when she became 21. William, then a baby, was to receive the remainder of the trust funds, provided the sum did not amount to more than £10,000, when he came of age." The sons showed little or no interest in their father's businesses and rapidly sold or leased them, Anthony II to Richard Crawshay, who was one of the witnesses to the father's will, and Thomas to his uncle Richard Hill. Both took on estates in Berkshire.

== Sources ==
- Jacob M. Price, 'Bacon, Anthony (bap. 1717, d. 1786)', Oxford Dictionary of National Biography, Oxford University Press, Sept 2004; online edn, May 2008 subscription needed, accessed 26 May 2008.

Parliament of Great Britain
| Preceded by John Wilkes; Welbore Ellis | Member of Parliament for Aylesbury; 1764–1784; With: Welbore Ellis to 1768; John Durand 1768–1774; John Aubrey 1774–1780; Thomas Orde 1780–1784 | Succeeded by Sir Thomas Hallifax; William Wrightson |
