= Rose Mary Crawshay =

British philanthropist (1828–1907)

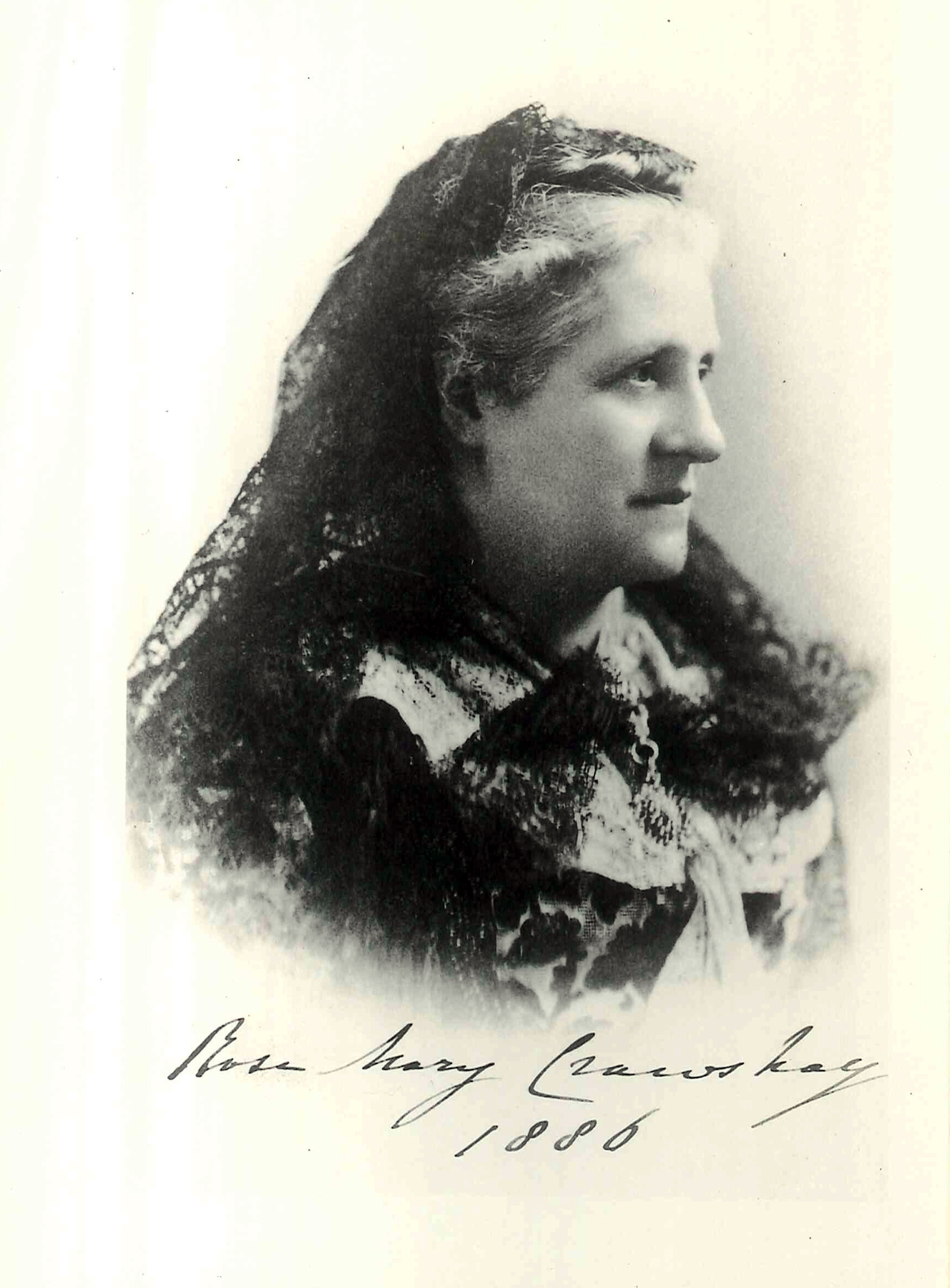
- in the 1870s
- Born: Rose Mary Yeates; 1828; Berkshire, England, United Kingdom of Great Britain and Ireland
- Died: 2 June 1907 (aged 78–79); Cathedine, Wales, United Kingdom of Great Britain and Ireland
- Known for: Philanthropy
- Spouse: Robert Thompson Crawshay
- Children: 5

Rose Mary Crawshay (1828–1907) was a British philanthropist. She commissioned free libraries and a non-fiction prize for women.

== Life ==
Crawshay was born Rose Mary Yeates in Caversham Grove in Oxfordshire to Wilson Yeates and his first wife. She married the 29-year-old Robert Thompson Crawshay on 15 May 1846 at St Peter's Church, Caversham. He was the last of the Merthyr Tydfil ironmasters. She became the mistress of the 72 roomed and 15 towered Cyfarthfa Castle.

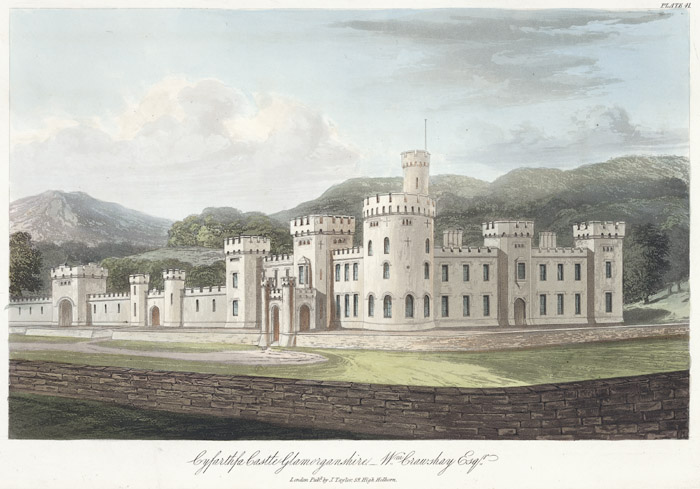
Her home in the 1840s

The marriage was not happy but they did have five children William Thompson in 1847, Rose Harriette Thompson the following year, Henrietta Louise in 1851, Robert Thompson in 1853 and Richard Frederick in 1859. The following year her husband had a stroke which left him deaf. She involved herself in public life and encouraged the idea of reforming matrimonial law. She was not keen on Welsh culture and she joined the National Society for Women's Suffrage founded by Lydia Becker in 1867. She became a Vice President of the Bristol and West of England National Society for Women's Suffrage.

In 1870 women were first allowed to become members of school boards. The following year she had joined the school board in Merthyr Tydfil and she not only joined but chaired the school board at Vaynor. No woman before 1900 sat on two school boards, and Crawshay chaired one and was re-elected twice retiring in 1879. Meanwhile, in 1872 she had helped form the Swansea Training College which was the first facility in Wales where women could train to be qualified teachers.

She created the Byron, Shelley, Keats in Memoriam Prize Fund in 1888, stated by the British Academy to be the only UK literary prize for female scholars. The Rose Mary Crawshay Prize is now "only" £500, but it provides a valuable recognition for non-fiction women writers. It has been awards since 1916 by the British Academy.

A philanthropist, she paid for part of Vaynor and Penderyn High School in about 1861. Crawshay opened seven free libraries which she opened on Sundays and insisted that they were open to men and women. When 49 local miners died in a disaster she visited each family.
