= Charles Wood (ironmaster) =

English ironmaster

Charles Wood (1702 – October 1774) was an English ironmaster and one of the inventors of the potting and stamping method of making wrought iron from pig iron.

== Parents ==
Charles Wood was the 7th of 15 children of William Wood of Wolverhampton and his wife Margaret, daughter of Richard Molyneux, an ironmonger in that area. William Wood followed his father-in-law's trade until 1715, when he became an ironmaster too and later entered into a contract to provide copper coinage for Ireland. He was also a projector, floating his business as an ironmaster as a joint stock company at the time of the South Sea Bubble (1720). Later, he sought to develop a new process of ironmaking and to obtain a charter for a "Company of Ironmasters of Great Britain". However the process (carried on at Frizington, Cumberland) produced little iron and he probably died in debt.

== Career ==
Charles Wood was a partner in some of the businesses, and certainly in the final one. His father's will left him a legacy of £15000, but his father died insolvent. The result was that Charles and some of his brothers were also made bankrupt in the following years.

=== Jamaica ===
Charles Wood went out to Carolina in 1733 following his bankruptcy but only stayed there a couple of years. He returned to Cumberland to marry Anne Piele of Buttermere and then went to Jamaica to superintend lead mines in Liguanea. They had a child in Jamaica in 1739, but the next was born at Whitehaven. His activities between 1741 and 1747 remain unknown, but in 1747, he was appointed assay master to the Governor of Jamaica.

=== Platinum ===
In this period, William Brownrigg (from 1742 a Fellow of the Royal Society) reported Wood's experiments on a metal, subsequently known as platinum. This had been found in the course of alluvial gold working in what is now Colombia, and had been smuggled from Cartagena to Jamaica. Wood reported this to Brownrigg in about 1741. Brownrigg reported it to the Royal Society in 1750. They found the metal did not react with acid and was unaffected by the usual process for extracting silver from lead.

=== Low Mill, Egremont ===
In 1749, Wood returned to Cumberland to build and manage a forge at Egremont. His partners were Peter How, William Hicks, and Gabriel Griffiths, a Whitehaven brazier. Wood and How leased coal mines in Egremont, while How, Griffiths, William Brownrigg and Joseph Bowes (a merchant) leased iron ore mines. He recorded experiments in iron making in a memorandum book. Initially he sued iron ore according to his father's process, but later moved on to reworking scrap iron and later still "coldshort metal", probably pig iron.

In September 1754, Wood and toured the Midlands with Gabriel Griffiths, visiting ironworks in the area. They visited fireclay works at Stourbridge and his brother John Wood, who had a forge at Wednesbury. John was working scraps and using pots to do so.

In 1763, Charles and John Wood patented their ironmaking process, which is usually described by historians as potting and stamping. This followed one to John Wood alone in 1761.

In December 1763, Peter How's tobacco firm became bankrupt, as did the braziers' business of Gabriel Griffiths and Robert Ross. The fate of the forge is not clear. In 1789, the building had been suffered to decay, and the expense of repairing it was more than the lease was worth, so that the lease was surrendered. However, Wood had left there in 1766 to go to Merthyr Tydfil.

=== Cyfarthfa ===
William Brownrigg and Anthony Bacon (a London merchant born in Whitehaven) leased the mines in 4,000 acres (16 km^{2}) at Merthyr Tydfil. Wood was brought in to build a forge for them there and he reached Merthyr in April 1766. The forge had six races leading off the river Taff, for a clay mill, two stampers, two hammers, and a chafery. In addition there were air furnaces, in which the iron was heated during the refining process. A drying shed for the pots and other buildings.

A blast furnace, 50 feet (15 m) high and blown by blowing cylinders was begun to be built that autumn, but was probably not completed until the following year. In the meantime, pig iron was needed for the forge to work, so Wood arranged for the owners to take over the nearby Plymouth Furnace. Wood returned to Lowmill in January 1766, but was back at Merthyr in April. He remained there as manager until his death in 1774. His widow stayed there until her death in 1799.

== Sources ==
- J. Gross (ed.): The diary of Charles Wood of Cyfarthfa Ironworks, Merthyr Tydfil, 1766-1767, with P. Riden, 'Introduction' (Merton Priory Press, Cardiff 2001).
- L B Hunt: 'The First Experiments on Platinum - Charles Wood's Samples from Spanish America', Platinum Metals Review, 29(4), 1985, 180–184.open link
- J. M. Treadwell: 'William Wood and the Company of Ironmasters of Great Britain', Business History 16(2), 1974, 93–112.
- J. M. Treadwell: 'Swift, William Wood, and the Factual Basis of Satire', The Journal of British Studies, Vol. 15(2) (Spring, 1976), pp. 76–91.subscription required
