= Coins of British America =

The coins of British America were issued between the 17th and 18th century, with the first coins being minted as far back as 1652.

== 1652 coinage ==
The silver threepence was made in Boston just a few weeks after the colonial mint opened in 1652. One side of the coin bears a simple “NE” stamp to signify New England. The other side denotes its value in Roman numerals.

== 1688 coinage ==
This coin depicts King James II of England on a horse on the obverse, and crowned shields on the reverse.

== William Wood's coinage ==
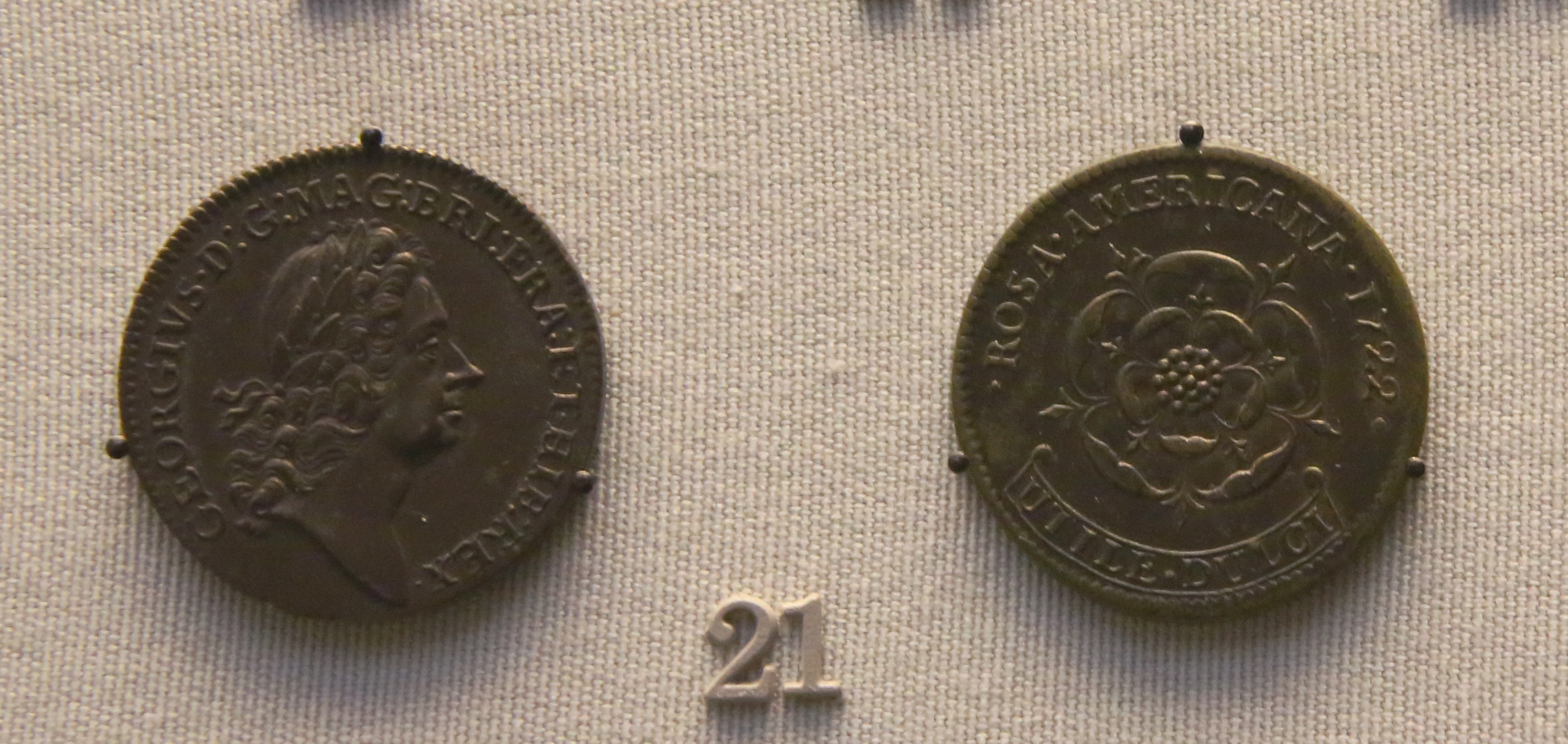
The Rosa Americana halfpenny

This issue is also known as the Rosa Americana (Latin for American Rose) coinage. These coins depict a laureated portrait of George I of Great Britain facing right on the obverse. The Halfpenny and 1 Penny depict a rose right in the centre of the reverse, whereas the Twopence depicts a crowned rose on the reverse.

The 1 Penny also exists with a crowned rose depicted on the reverse dated 1723.

== See also ==
- Higley copper
- Vermont copper
- William Wood (ironmaster)
