= Joshua Dixon =

English physician and biographer

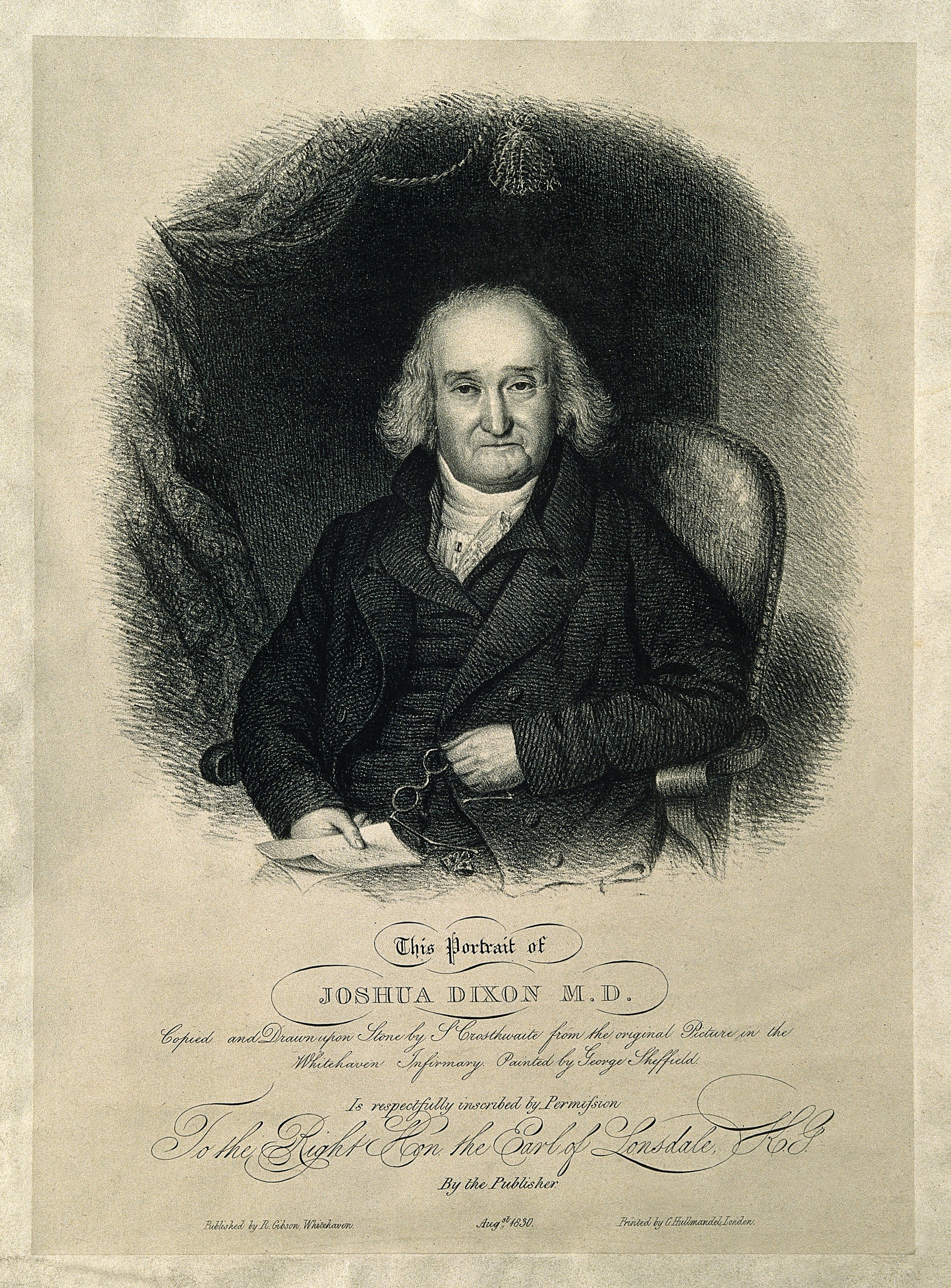
Joshua Dixon

Joshua Dixon (baptised 1743, died 1825) was an English physician and biographer.

== Life ==
Dixon was baptised in Whitehaven, Cumberland in 1743. In 1764 he went to Liverpool, to work for the apothecary Edward Parr.

Dixon took the degree of M.D. at the University of Edinburgh in 1768. He subsequently practiced as a physician in Whitehaven. There in 1783 he helped establish the dispensary, and then ran it.

Dixon died on 7 January 1825.

== Works ==
At graduation, Dixon's dissertation was De Febre Nervosa. He wrote tracts and essays, acknowledged and anonymous. His major work is The Literary Life of William Brownrigg, M.D., F.R.S. (1801), on his reticent friend William Brownrigg. It was published with an Account of the Coal Mines near Whitehaven, and Observations on the means of preventing Epidemic Fevers.
