= Vaynor and Penderyn High School =

Location
- Old Church Street; Merthyr Tydfil, CF48 2RR; Wales
- Coordinates: 51°45′37″N 3°24′08″W

Information
- Established: 1861
- Closed: 2005
- Local authority: Merthyr Tydfil
- Department for Education URN: 401828 Tables
- Ofsted: Reports

Vaynor and Penderyn High School was situated at Cefn Coed, Merthyr Tydfil in Wales. Although now part of Merthyr Tydfil, the area covered by the school was part of the old county of Brecknockshire (Breconshire) until local government reorganisation in 1974. The designated catchment area of the school was made up of the communities served principally by Ysgol y Graig Primary in Merthyr Tydfil and Penderyn and Hirwaun Primary Schools in Rhondda Cynon Taff, and is an area which suffers a high degree of economic deprivation. The school had an age range of 11-18 and a capacity of 455 places which would be small for a secondary school even if full.

The School was opened by Robert Crawshay in 1861 but closed in 2005.

== History ==
Few schools in Wales can boast a history as long as Vaynor & Penderyn. The school can record its history back to well over three centuries, with the first school on this site being a circulating school established in a farmhouse in 1740. There has been a school of one kind or another serving the community and offering opportunity of an education to one and all on this very site ever since.

The oldest building still in use dates from 1861. This works school was paid for by Rose Mary Crawshay, wife of the Cyfartha Ironmaster at a time when Merthyr Tydfil was arguably the Iron capital of the world. The school was extended in 1868 following the passing of the Parliamentary Bill known as the Forster Education Act.

This school continued to serve the community until it was further extended in 1932 when the Vaynor and Penderyn Grammar and Secondary School was established. The first Headmaster, Mr. Trevor Lovett, established a national reputation as an advocate of multilateral schools (a kind of precursor to comprehensive education) and was instrumental in placing this school at the forefront of educational innovation in the 1930s and 1940s. Innovations that as one might expect were a response to the unemployment and economic depression that South Wales experienced throughout the 1930s. From c1950 to 1990 it was called Vaynor and Penderyn Comprehensive School/Ysgol Gufun Y Faenor a Phenderyn.

This school site has offered the opportunity of an education for one and all for more than 250 years, a record superseded in Wales only by some of the older independent schools.

== School Site ==
Having such a long and varied history has produced a school with a range of buildings, arguably one from each of the last three centuries, unique to a local authority school in Wales. Located in the heart of Cefn Coed, the school is surrounded on all sides by residential property, this gave the school a unique community feel and spirit.

Split over 3 distinct areas, Upper, Middle and Lower School, with a collection of "temporary" class rooms, some of which dated back to the 1960s. The school fields and tennis courts are located outside of the campus at the lower end of the school site and offer considerable area for rugby, football and track sports.

Upper School

The newest of the buildings on the site is located here along with 3 temporary classrooms. The main building constructed during the 1960s over two floors, consisted of the old headmaster's office and administration area and housed subjects such business studies and computers as well as the new sixth form common room and toilet block. Temporary class rooms housed music, biology, chemistry and history.

Middle School

Built in 1932 the grand Victorian style red brick building stretches practically the width of the entire school site. The school hall and gym sitting to the east of the site. A unique feature of this collection of buildings was ceiling mounted radiators, which often bemused and what would today be called a cavity wall construction. Subjects included Physics, French, English, Math's, Geography and Welsh. The deputy heads office, caretakers office and staff room along with the old mistress room were here.

Lower School

The oldest of the schools buildings are both based here. The Crawshay family funded the construction of the larger of the two in 1861 which housed canteen and old sixth form common room, the CDT and Home Economics Departments. A two-story stone building housing the woodwork and later art department sits below the school hall and is believed to be the older of the two.

== The End Of Vaynor and Penderyn ==
There had been a continuous downward trend in its pupils numbers in its latter years and the school had around 256 pupils on roll by mid-2004, only 30 of whom were sixth formers.

In October 2001 Merthyr Tydfil County Borough Council undertook preliminary consultation on its 'Review of Secondary School Provision in Merthyr Tydfil'. This outlined a range of possible proposals in relation to secondary schools and sixth form provision. Two of the options presented included the closure of Vaynor and Penderyn.

Following the end of this preliminary consultation, the Local Authority together with the National Council for Education and Training and other partner bodies decided to establish, with funding from the Learning Challenge Fund, a Project Management Team to further develop and move forward the options outlined in the review. However, pupils numbers at Vaynor and Penderyn continued to decline rapidly, falling from 363 in January 2003 to 284 in January 2004. This prompted the Local Authority to consider bringing forward a proposal to discontinue Vaynor and Penderyn in advance of any more general proposals identified by the Project Management Team.

On 15 January 2004 the Authority issued a consultation document outlining its case for closing the school and, subject to parental preference, transferring its pupils to Pen-Y-Dre High School. The document was sent to a comprehensive list of interested parties and invited comments by 5 March 2004. A notice outlining the proposal was also placed in various newspapers.

Certain consultees were also invited to attend meetings. In the case of staff, governors and parents at Vaynor and Penderyn, meetings were held at the school for each group in turn on 27 January 2004. A meeting with the School Council was held on 28 January. Meetings were also held on 29 January with the staff, governors, parents and the School Council at Pen-y-Dre High School, on 3 February with the parents of Vaynor's three feeder primary schools (Ysgol y Graig, Hirwaun and Penderyn) and on 9 February with the Governing Body of Bishop Hedley High School.

Votes were held at each of the meetings. The thirty-three Vaynor and Penderyn and feeder school parents who attended voted unanimously against the proposal. Six of Vaynor's Governing Body voted in favour of the proposal with two against and three abstentions. Sixteen of the school's staff voted for the proposal, none voted against, and four abstained. The School Council voted three in favour, twenty-two against with one abstention. With the exception of one member of staff all those who were present at the meetings held at Pen y Dre and Bishop Hedley voted in favour of the proposal.

Following the end of consultation on 5 March 2004 and after consideration of responses from consultees, the Authority decided on 7 April to proceed with the proposal to close Vaynor and Penderyn and a notice was published on 16 April 2004.
