= Cyfarthfa Ironworks =

Former industrial site in Wales

Coordinates: 51°45′09″N 3°23′39″W

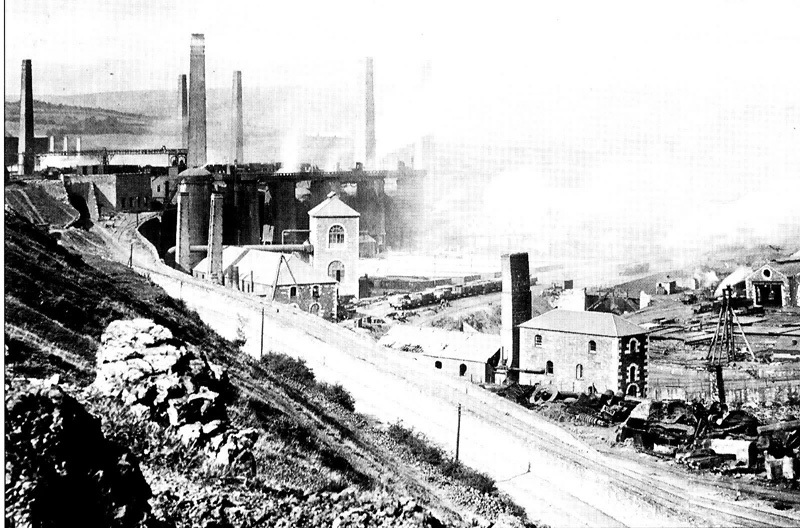
Cyfarthfa Ironworks in 1894

The Cyfarthfa Ironworks were major 18th- and 19th-century ironworks in Cyfarthfa, on the north-western edge of Merthyr Tydfil, in South East Wales.

== The beginning ==
The Cyfarthfa works were begun in 1765 by Anthony Bacon, the Member of Parliament for Aylesbury, and William Brownrigg, who like him was a native of Whitehaven, Cumberland. They secured a lease for ninety-nine years to exploit the reserves of coal and iron on the neighbouring estate to Dowlais for an annual sum of £100 without any liability for royalties. The land which was covered by the lease comprised 4,000 acres (1,600 ha) on the west side of the river Taff at Merthyr Tydfil.

The partners employed Brownrigg's brother-in-law Charles Wood to build a furnace and a forge, to enable them to deploy the potting and stamping process for which he and his brother had a patent. The furnace was powered by water from the river, the race dividing into six to power a clay mill (for making the pots), two stampers, two helve hammers and a chafery. The construction of the first coke blast furnace began in August 1766. This was intended to be 50 feet (15 m) high with cast iron blowing cylinders, rather than the traditional bellows. It was probably brought into blast in autumn 1767. In the meantime, Plymouth Ironworks was leased to provide pig iron for the forge.

Brownrigg retired as a partner in 1777, receiving £1,500 for his share. From about that time Richard Crawshay was Bacon's partner in his contracts to supply cannon to the Board of Ordnance, but perhaps not in the ironworks. Bacon had previously subcontracted cannon-founding to John Wilkinson, but henceforth made them at Cyfarthfa, as is indicated by his asking for ships carrying them to be convoyed from Penarth. Bacon had the Cyfarthfa Canal, a short tub boat waterway, constructed during the latter part of the 1770s, to bring coal to the ironworks.

Under the House of Commons (Disqualification) Act 1782 (22 Geo. 3. c. 45), Bacon, as a Member of Parliament, had to relinquish government contracts and passed the forge and boring mill with the gun-founding business to Francis Homfray. However, in 1784 Homfray gave it up to David Tanner an ironmaster from Monmouth, to enable his sons to establish the Penydarren Ironworks. Tanner employed three managers: James Cockshutt, Thomas Treharne and Francis William Bowzer. However, like Homfray, he did not stay long. Instead, soon afterwards, in 1786, the year of Bacon's death, he gave up the works.

Bacon left a family of illegitimate children and was the subject of Chancery proceedings. The court directed a lease of the whole works to Richard Crawshay, who took as his partners, William Stevens (a London merchant) and James Cockshutt. Crawshay took out a licence from Henry Cort for the use of his puddling process, and proceeded to build the necessary rolling mill. However, difficulties remained with the puddling process and it was not until perhaps 1791 that these were resolved. In 1790 Crawshay terminated the partnership, which had been barely profitable, and continued the works alone, adding further furnaces in the following years.

== The Crawshay heyday ==
=== Richard Crawshay 1739–1810 ===
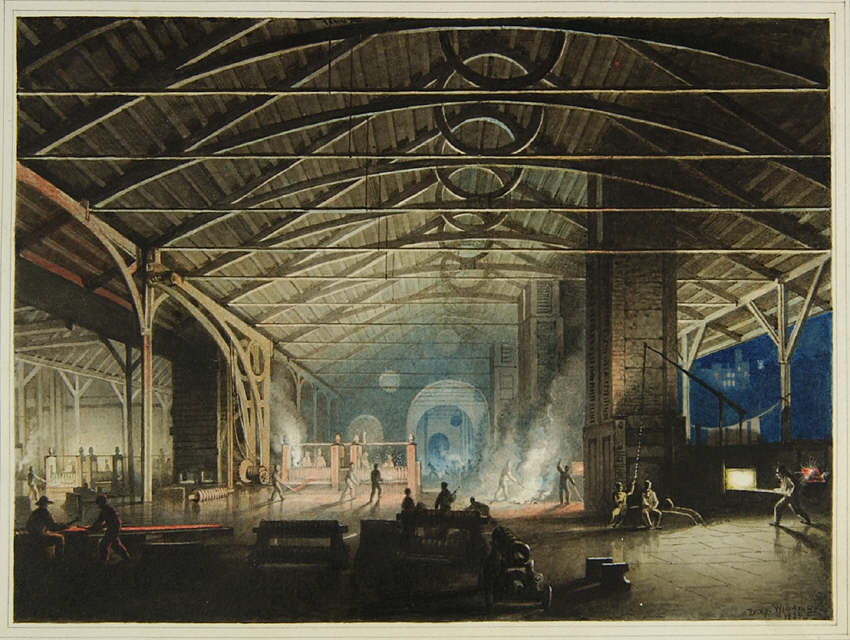
Cyfarthfa Ironworks Interior at Night, by Penry Williams, (1825)

Under Richard Crawshay, the Cyfarthfa works rapidly became an important producer of iron products. Great Britain was involved in various naval conflicts during this time around the British Empire, and the demand for cannon and other weapons was great. Cyfarthfa works became critical to the success of the war effort, so much so that Admiral Nelson paid a personal visit to the works in 1802. The Crawshay family crest included a pile of cannonballs in token of the crucial role of their ironworks. Richard passed on the responsibility for the works to his son, William, but the latter was less committed to the works than his father.

=== William Crawshay II 1788–1867 ===
William Crawshay II was appointed by his father William Crawshay to manage the works after Richard's death in 1810. By 1819, the ironworks had grown to six blast furnaces, producing 23,000 tons of iron. The works continued to play an enormous role in providing high-quality iron to fuel the voracious appetite of the Industrial Revolution, with the Tsar of Russia sending a representative to view the production of iron rail. During this time, the Cyfarthfa works lost its position as the leading ironworks in Merthyr Tydfil to its longtime rival, the Dowlais Ironworks.

It was also during this period that Crawshay had built a home, which became known as Cyfarthfa Castle. The buildings were erected in 1824, at a cost of £30,000 (equivalent to £2,104,964.72 in 2007). They were solidly and massively built of local stone, and designed by Robert Lugar, the same engineer who had built many bridges and viaducts for the local railways. It was designed in the form of a "sham" or mock castle, complete with crenellated battlements, towers and turrets, in Norman and Gothic styles, and occupied by William Crawshay II and his family. It stood, and still does, amid 158 acres (0.64 km^{2}) of landscaped parkland, and overlooked the family-owned ironworks just across the river. The Cyfarthfa Canal ceased operation in the late 1830s during William Crawshay II's time as manager.

=== Robert Thompson Crawshay 1847–1879 ===
Robert Thompson Crawshay was the last of the great Crawshay ironmasters, as foreign competition and the rising cost of iron ore (much of which had to be imported as local supplies were exhausted) exacted a heavy toll on the Cyfarthfa works. Robert was reluctant to switch to the production of steel, but in 1875 the works was forced to close.

== Decline and final closure ==
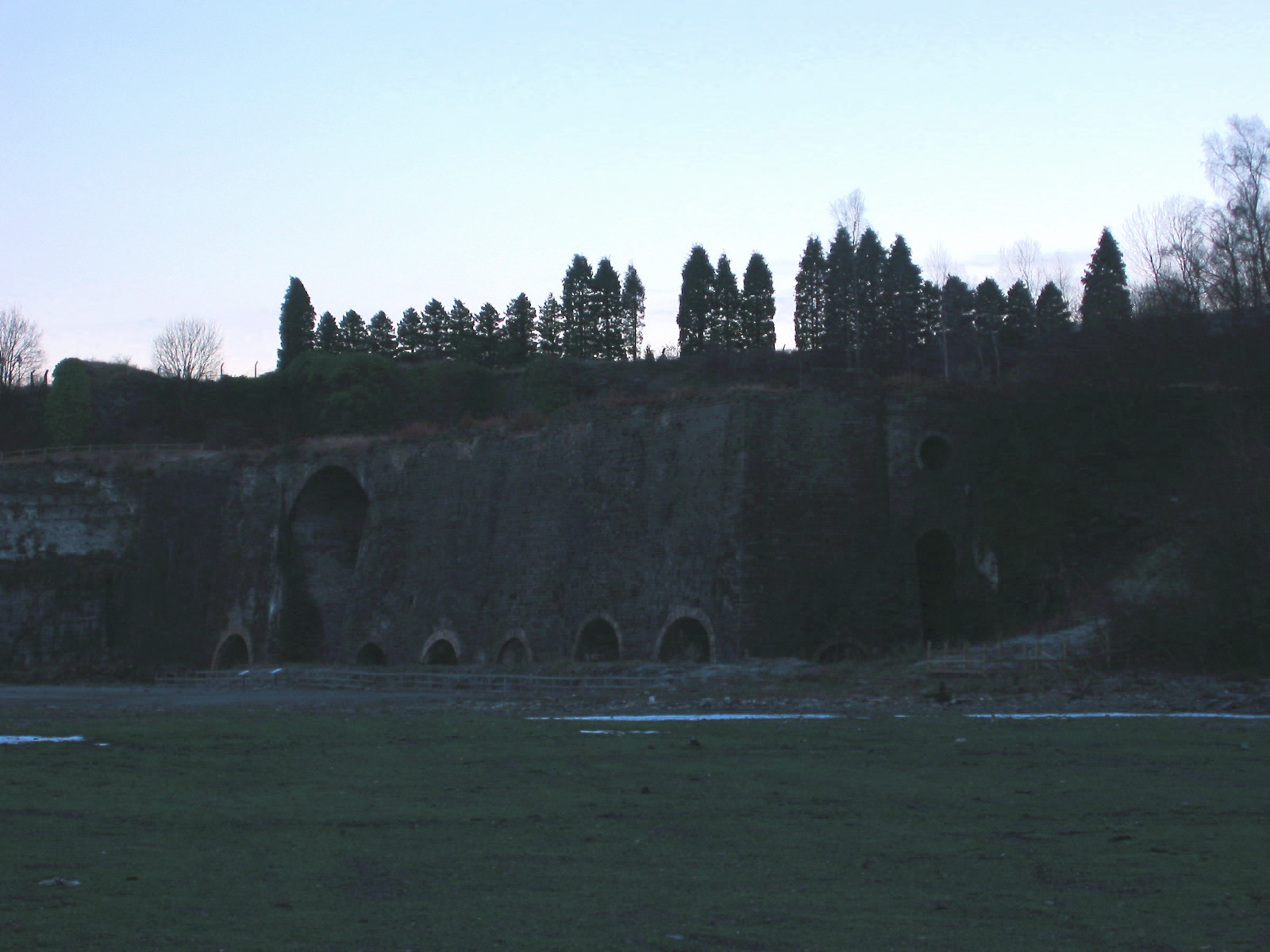
The abandoned Cyfarthfa Ironworks.

=== The next generation ===
After R. T. Crawshay's death, his sons reopened the works, but soon closed again for a long and costly rebuild that was not complete until 1884, while a steel works was constructed. Crawshay Brothers, Cyfarthfa, Limited continued the business until 1902, when the works were sold to Guest Keen and Nettlefolds Limited, the proprietors of the Dowlais Ironworks.

By 1910, the steelworks had been forced to close again, and while it was briefly reopened in 1915 to aid in the production of materials for World War I, the works closed for the last time in 1919. It fell into disrepair until it was dismantled in 1928. The failure of the works was a devastating blow to the local community, as it had depended heavily on the works for its economic livelihood.

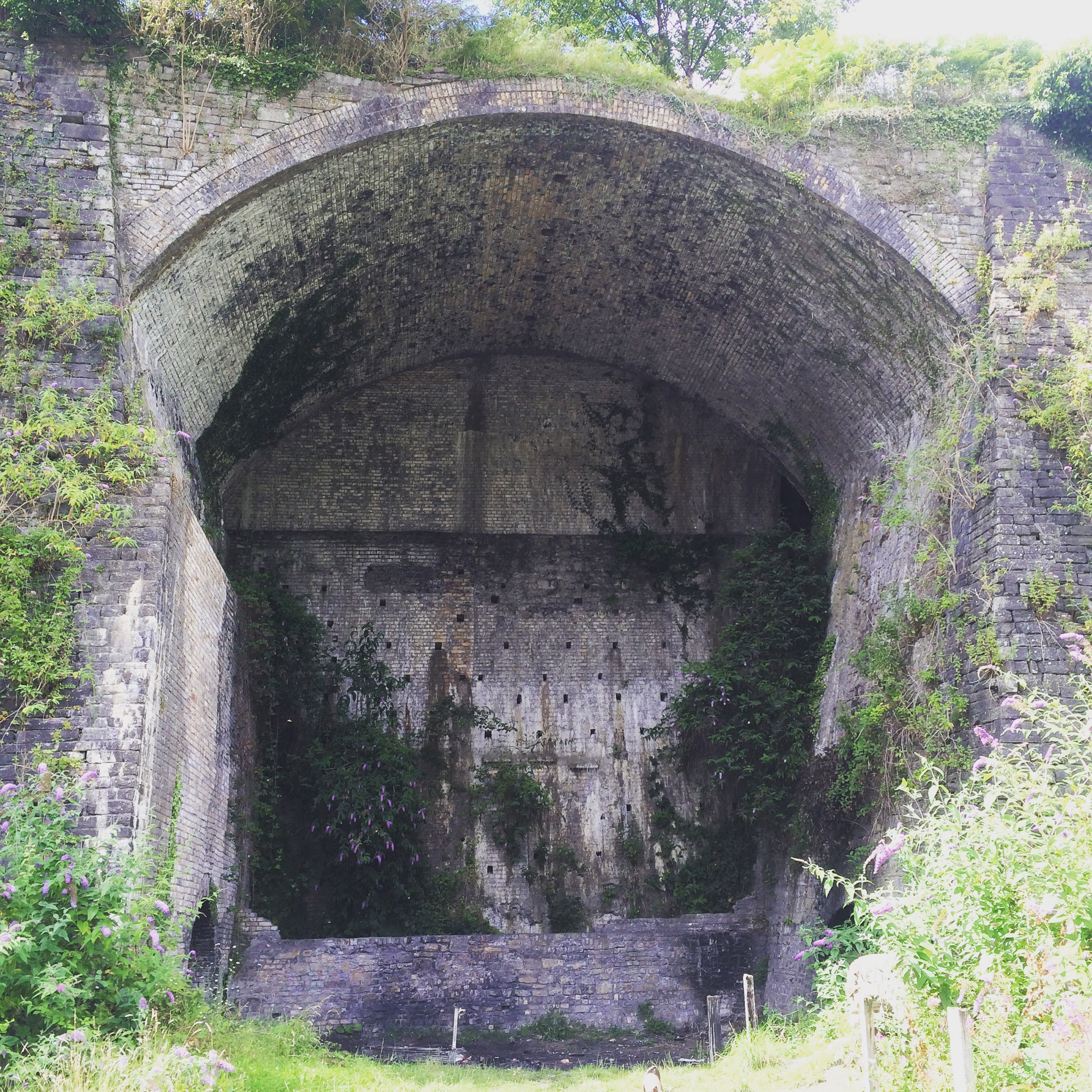
The remains of a blast furnace at Cyfarthfa Ironworks

== The works today ==
Portions of the enormous complex that formed the Cyfarthfa works remain intact today, including six of the original blast furnaces. The furnaces at Cyfarthfa are the largest and most complete surviving specimens of their type anywhere. In 2013, workers building a do-it-yourself store near the site of the old ironworks unearthed a significant portion of the old factory. Found during the excavation were a canal, tram lines and the plant's coking ovens; until the discovery, little was known about how the ironworks prepared its fuel. The structures were razed shortly after the end of World War I. Archaeologists were given an opportunity to study the artefacts before they were reburied. The site is now part of the Cyfarthfa Heritage Area and is administered by Merthyr Tydfil County Borough Council. The council has plans for restoration of the ironworks site.

== See also ==
- Benjamin Hall
- Pont-y-Cafnau, world's earliest iron railway bridge
- The Fire People, a novel by Alexander Cordell about the lives of the workers at Cyfarthfa and surrounding districts.
- Eliot Crawshay-Williams
