= List of scheduled monuments in Merthyr Tydfil County Borough =

Merthyr Tydfil County Borough has 43 scheduled monuments. The prehistoric scheduled sites include many burial cairns and several defensive enclosures. The Roman period is represented by a Roman Road. The medieval periods include two inscribed stones, several house platforms and two castle sites. Finally the modern period has 14 sites, mainly related to Merthyr's industries, including coal mining, transportation and iron works. Almost all of Merthyr Tydfil was in the historic county of Glamorgan, with several of the northernmost sites having been in Brecknockshire.

Scheduled monuments have statutory protection. The compilation of the list is undertaken by Cadw Welsh Historic Monuments, which is an executive agency of the National Assembly of Wales. The list of scheduled monuments below is supplied by Cadw with additional material from RCAHMW and Glamorgan-Gwent Archaeological Trust.

== Scheduled monuments in Merthyr Tydfil County Borough ==
Image	Name	Site type	Community	Location	Details	Historic County	Period	SAM No & Refs
	Gelligaer Standing Stone	Standing stone	Bedlinog	51.7221°N 3.2994°W, SO103034	A 2 m (6.6 ft) high stone on open moorland. Probably Bronze Age and with the possible remains of a Bronze Age burial alongside. An inscription on the stone, now mostly illegible, is described as either post-Roman/Early Christian or Early Medieval.	Glamorganshire	Prehistoric; Early Medieval	GM221
	Coed Cae Round Cairns	Round cairn	Bedlinog	51.6892°N 3.3127°W, ST093997	Located in a cairnfield with at least 19 stony mounds, the scheduling consists of a group of eight Bronze Age burial cairns.	Glamorganshire	Prehistoric; Bronze Age	GM271
	Gelligaer Common Round Cairns	Round cairn	Bedlinog	51.7211°N 3.3007°W, SO102032	A group of eleven Bronze Age burial cairns.	Glamorganshire	Prehistoric; Bronze Age	GM220
	Carn Castell y Meibion ring cairn	Ring cairn	Troed-y-rhiw	51.7185°N 3.3979°W, SO035031	A ring cairn, possibly dating to the Bronze Age, with an 8 m (26 ft) diameter and surrounded by a 3 m (9.8 ft) wide stony ring bank.	Glamorganshire	Prehistoric; Bronze Age	GM586
	Brynbychan Round Cairn	Round cairn	Merthyr Vale, (also Mountain Ash), (see also Rhondda Cynon Taff)	51.6812°N 3.3564°W, ST063989	A Bronze Age circular cairn with a diameter of 18 m (59 ft). There is an OS triangulation pillar on the site.	Glamorganshire	Prehistoric; Bronze Age	GM286
	Cefn Merthyr Round Cairns	Cairnfield	Merthyr Vale	51.6922°N 3.3287°W, SO082001		Glamorganshire	Prehistoric	GM272
	Morlais Hill ring cairn	Ring cairn	Pant	51.7774°N 3.3747°W, SO052096		Glamorganshire	Prehistoric	GM563
	Tir Lan round barrow cemetery	Round barrow	Treharris	51.6857°N 3.31°W, ST095993	The remains of six Bronze Age round barrows, three to the north-west and three to the south-east of Tir Lan farm. All six remain substantially intact despite being reduced by ploughing in the past.	Glamorganshire	Prehistoric	GM270
	Garn Las Earthwork	Round cairn	Troed-y-rhiw, (also Aberdare), (see also Rhondda Cynon Taf)	51.7248°N 3.4073°W, SO028038	The remains a circular burial cairn measuring 14 m (46 ft) in diameter, probably dating to the Bronze Age.	Glamorganshire	Prehistoric; Bronze Age	GM236
	Merthyr Common Round Cairns	Round cairn	Troed-y-rhiw	51.7295°N 3.3357°W, SO078042	A group of six Bronze Age burial cairns ranging from 5 to 19 m (16 to 62 ft) in diameter.	Glamorganshire	Prehistoric	GM222
	Carn Ddu platform cairn	Platform Cairn	Vaynor	51.8037°N 3.3998°W, SO035125		Glamorganshire	Prehistoric	GM570
	Cefn Cil-Sanws ring cairn	Ring cairn	Vaynor	51.7875°N 3.4162°W, SO024108		Glamorganshire	Prehistoric	GM567
	Cefn Cil-Sanws, Cairn on SW side of	Round Cairn	Vaynor	51.7785°N 3.4147°W, SO024098		Brecknockshire	Prehistoric	GM599
	Coetgae'r Gwartheg barrow cemetery	Round cairn	Vaynor	51.7935°N 3.419°W, SO022114		Glamorganshire	Prehistoric	GM568
	Garn Pontsticill ring cairn	Ring cairn	Vaynor	51.7966°N 3.375°W, SO052117		Glamorganshire	Prehistoric	GM569
	Dyke 315m E of Tyla-Glas	Ditch	Bedlinog	51.7033°N 3.2876°W, SO111012	The remains of a later prehistoric/medieval dyke with a clearly defined bank and ditch running east-west across a ridge top. The 3 m (9.8 ft) wide ditch is 1.5 m (4.9 ft) deep at its east end.	Glamorganshire	Prehistoric	GM260
	Cefn Cil-Sanws Defended Enclosure	Enclosure - Defensive	Vaynor	51.7796°N 3.4105°W, SO027099		Brecknockshire	Prehistoric	GM600
	Enclosure East of Nant Cwm Moel	Enclosure - Defensive	Vaynor	51.7922°N 3.394°W, SO039113		Glamorganshire	Prehistoric	GM518
	Enclosure on Coedcae'r Ychain	Enclosure - Defensive	Vaynor	51.7915°N 3.4167°W, SO023112		Glamorganshire	Prehistoric	GM519
Gelligaer Common Roman road	Gelligaer Common Roman Road	Road	Bedlinog	51.7226°N 3.3007°W, SO102034		Glamorganshire	Roman	GM556
	Nant Crew Inscribed Stone (now in St John's Church, Cefn Coed )	Standing stone	Vaynor	51.7628°N 3.4035°W, SO032081	A 1.5 m (5 ft) high square-sectioned pillar stone thought to date to the Bronze Age. A Latin inscription on the west face and cross incised on the north face are from the 6th and 7th-9th centuries. Holes in the stone indicate that it had been used as a gatepost.	Brecknockshire	Early Medieval	BR145
	Platform Houses and Cairn Cemetery on Dinas Noddfa	House platforms (& Cairnfield)	Bedlinog	51.7195°N 3.3132°W, SO093031	Medieval house platforms, also prehistoric cairnfield	Glamorganshire	Medieval	GM314
	Platform Houses on Coly Uchaf	Platform house	Bedlinog	51.7112°N 3.3161°W, SO091022		Glamorganshire	Medieval	GM320
Morlais Castle	Morlais Castle	Castle	Pant	51.7768°N 3.3789°W, SO049095	The collapsed remains of a castle begun in 1288 by Gilbert de Clare, Lord of Glamorgan. The walls enclosed an area of approximately 130 by 60 m (430 by 200 ft). It was captured during the 1294-95 rebellion of Madog ap Llywelyn and may have been abandoned shortly afterwards.	Glamorganshire	Medieval	GM028
Cae Burdydd Castle	Cae Burdydd Castle	Motte	Vaynor	51.7824°N 3.3823°W, SO047102	A 3 m (9.8 ft) high motte and ditch dating to the medieval period. The diameter of 23 m (75 ft) narrows to 9 m (30 ft) at the top.	Brecknockshire	Medieval	BR118
	Cefn Car settlement	Building (Unclassified)	Vaynor	51.8084°N 3.4256°W, SO018131		Glamorganshire	Medieval	GM571
	Gurnos Quarry Tramroad & Leat	Industrial monument	Gurnos	51.7624°N 3.4002°W, SO034080		Glamorganshire	Post-Medieval/Modern	GM478
	Sarn Howell Pond and Watercourses	Pond	Town	51.7471°N 3.3241°W, SO086062		Glamorganshire	Post-Medieval/Modern	GM494
	Abercanaid egg-ended boiler	Egg-ended Boiler, re-purposed as garden shed	Troed-y-rhiw	51.7248°N 3.3679°W, SO056037		Glamorganshire	Post-Medieval/Modern	GM572
	Cyfarthfa Canal Level	Canal Level	Cyfarthfa	51.7388°N 3.3876°W, SO042053		Glamorganshire	Post-Medieval/Modern	GM467
	Cyfarthfa Tramroad Section at Heolgerrig	Tramroad	Cyfarthfa	51.7462°N 3.4044°W, SO031062		Glamorganshire	Post-Medieval/Modern	GM495
	Iron Ore Scours and Patch Workings at Winch Fawr, Merthyr Tydfil	Iron mine	Cyfarthfa	51.752°N 3.4241°W, SO017068		Glamorganshire	Post-Medieval/Modern	GM554
	Ynys Fach Iron Furnaces	Industrial monument	Cyfarthfa	51.745°N 3.3841°W, SO045060		Glamorganshire	Post-Medieval/Modern	GM331
Penydarren Tramway	Penydarren Tram Road	Trackway	Merthyr Vale	51.6707°N 3.3304°W, ST080977		Glamorganshire	Post-Medieval/Modern	GM359
	Iron Canal Bridge from Rhydycar	Bridge	Park	51.7504°N 3.3857°W, SO044066		Glamorganshire	Post-Medieval/Modern	GM486
Pont y Cafnau iron tramroad bridge	Pont-y-Cafnau tramroad bridge	Bridge	Park	51.7546°N 3.3956°W, SO037071	An ironwork bridge spanning the River Taff constructed in 1793. The name, meaning "bridge of troughs", comes from its unusual three tier design of a tramroad between two watercourses, one beneath the bridge deck and the other on an upper wooden structure which is no longer present. Pont-y-Cafnau is also Grade II* listed.	Glamorganshire	Post-Medieval/Modern; Post-Medieval	GM424
	Merthyr Tramroad: Morlais Castle section	Tramroad	Pant	51.7786°N 3.3826°W, SO047097		Glamorganshire	Post-Medieval/Modern	GM594
	Merthyr Tramroad Tunnel (Trevithick's Tunnel)	Tramroad	Troed-y-rhiw	51.7349°N 3.3686°W, SO055049		Glamorganshire	Post-Medieval/Modern	GM573
	Cwmdu Air Shaft & Fan	Air Shaft	Cyfarthfa	51.7371°N 3.4039°W, SO031051		Glamorganshire	Post-Medieval/Modern	GM460
Cyfarthfa Iron Works	Remains of Blast Furnaces, Cyfarthfa Ironworks	Blast Furnace	Park	51.7521°N 3.3952°W, SO037068		Glamorganshire	Post-Medieval/Modern	GM425
	Tai Mawr Leat for Cyfarthfa Iron Works	Leat	Park	51.7586°N 3.4046°W, SO031076		Glamorganshire	Post-Medieval/Modern	GM479
	Deserted Iron Mining Village, Ffos-y-fran	Industrial monument	Troed-y-rhiw	51.742°N 3.3463°W, SO071056		Glamorganshire	Post-Medieval/Modern	GM496

Scheduled monuments in Merthyr Tydfil, Wales.
=Prehistoric =Roman =Early Medieval
=Medieval =Post-Medieval/Modern

== See also ==
- Grade I listed buildings in Merthyr Tydfil County Borough
- Grade II* listed buildings in Merthyr Tydfil County Borough
- List of Cadw properties
- List of castles in Wales
- List of hill forts in Wales
- Historic houses in Wales
- List of monastic houses in Wales
- List of museums in Wales
- List of Roman villas in Wales

== Bibliography ==
- Newman, John (1995). Glamorgan. The Buildings of Wales. London: Penguin Books. ISBN 0-14-071056-6.
