= Robert Thompson Crawshay =

British ironmaster (1817–1879)

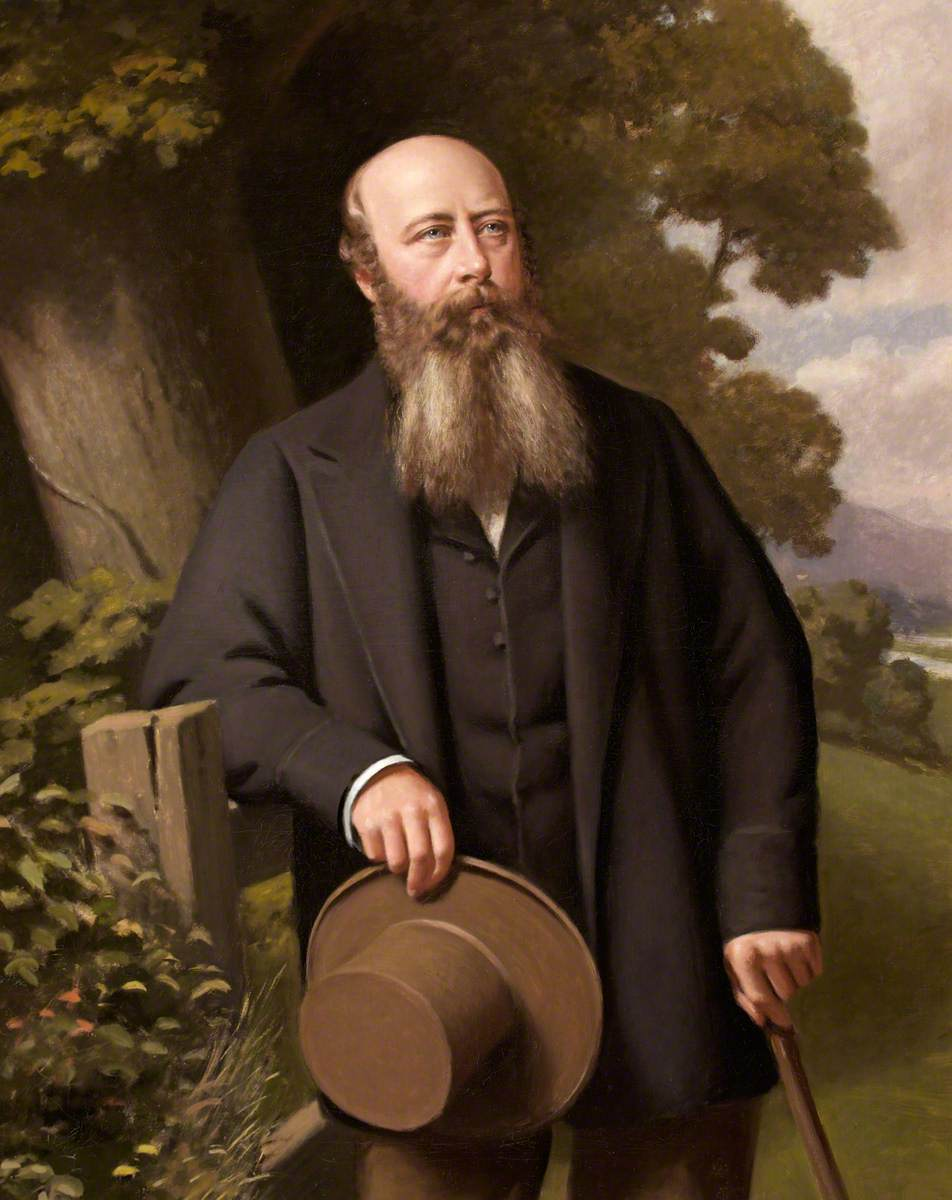

Robert Thompson Crawshay (3 March 1817 – 10 May 1879) was a Welsh ironmaster.

== Life ==
Crawshay, youngest son of William Crawshay by his second wife, Bella Thompson, was born at Cyfarthfa Ironworks. He was educated at Dr. Prichard's school at Llandaff, and from a very early age manifested interest in his father's ironworks, and spent much of his time among them. As years increased he determined to learn practically the business of an ironworker, and in turn assisted in the puddling, the battery, and the rolling mills; he carried this so far that he even exchanged his own diet for that of the workmen. On the death of his brother William by drowning at the old passage of the Severn he became acting manager of the ironworks, and at a later period when his brother Henry removed to Newnham he came into the working control of the entire establishment.

On 15 May 1846 he married the 18 year old Rose Mary Yeates in Oxfordshire. She became the mistress of the 72 roomed Cyfarthfa Castle and she joined an unsettled marriage.

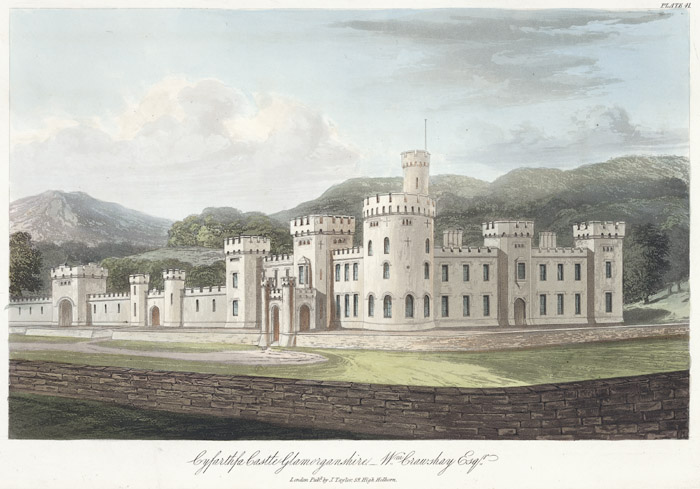
Their home in the 1840s

The marriage was not happy but they did have five children:- William Thompson in 1847, Rose Harriette Thompson the following year, Henrietta Louise in 1851, Robert Thompson in 1853 and Richard Frederick in 1859. The following year her husband had a stroke which left him deaf. Crawshay had been very interested in music but with his disability his leisure time was taken up with the expensive hobby of photography.

In 1846 the original lease of Cyfarthfa lapsed, and was renewed at Crawshay's earnest entreaties. On the death of his father, the active head of the business, in 1867 he became the sole manager, and not only considerably improved the works, but opened out the coal mines to a greater and more profitable issue.

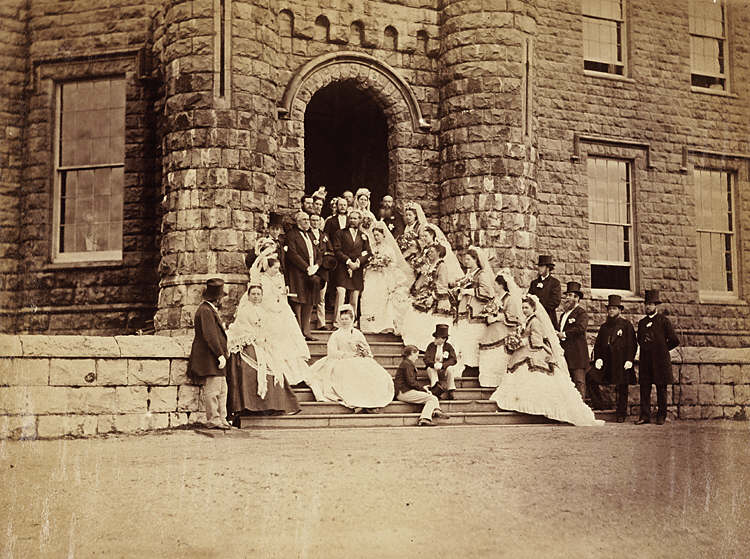
1871 Crawshay Wedding photographed by Robert Thompson Crawsahy on the steps of Cyfarthfa Castle, 29 April 1871 (Marriage of Henrietta Louise Crawshay to Captain 'Cookie' Ralston)

At this time there were upwards of five thousand men, women, and children employed at Cyfarthfa, all receiving good wages, and well looked after by their master. Crawshay was often spoken of as the "Iron King of Wales". His name came prominently before the public in connection with the great strikes of 1873–5. He was averse to unions among masters or men, but assented, as a necessary sequence of the action of the men, to a combination among the masters. Unionism became active at Cyfarthfa at a time of falling prices; Crawshay called his men together and warned them of the consequences of persisting in their demands; but as they would not yield the furnaces were one by one put out. Soon after came the revolution in the iron trade, leading to the discarding of iron for steel through the invention of the Bessemer and Siemens processes, and the thorough extinction of the old-fashioned trade of the Crawshays and the Guests.

Crawshay would have reopened his works for the benefit of his people had it not been very apparent that under no circumstances could Cyfarthfa again have become a paying concern. The collieries were, however, still kept active, employing about a thousand men, and several hundreds of the old workmen laboured on the estates.

For the last two years of his life he took little interest in business; he had become completely deaf and broken down by other physical infirmities. While on a visit to Cheltenham for the benefit of his health he died suddenly at the Queen's Hotel, and on 21 June following his personalty was sworn under £1,200,000. His son, William Thompson Crawshay, succeeded to the management of the extensive coalfields, and inherited his father's estate at Caversham in Berkshire.
