= William Brownrigg =

English physician and scientist (1711–1800)

William Brownrigg (24 March 1712 [O.S. 13 March 1711] – 6 January 1800) was an English physician and scientist who practised at Whitehaven in Cumberland. While there, Brownrigg carried out experiments that earned him the Copley Medal in 1766 for his work on carbonic acid gas. He was the first person to recognise platinum as a new element.

He was created a Fellow of the Royal Society.

== Early life and education ==
He was born at High Close Hall near Plumbland, England the son of local gentry, George Brownrigg. William's mother, Mary Brownrigg, was from Ireland.

William was educated in Latin and Greek by a local clergyman from the age of 13 and by the age of 15 was an apprentice to an apothecary in Carlisle. Then followed two years studying under a surgeon in London before going to Leiden where he studied under Boerhaave, 's Gravesande, van Royen and Albinus. He graduated in 1737 with his thesis "De Praxi Medica Ineunda" – about the environment where the clinician practises medicine. He gained the degree of Doctor of Medicine (MD).

== Medical career ==
Brownrigg returned to Britain and took up medicine with an established doctor called Richard Senhouse in Whitehaven. Senhouse died soon after, making Brownrigg the principal doctor in the area for many years to come. His casebook for 1737-1742 survives and was recently transcribed. It contains descriptions of his patients and remedies and some of the earliest English references to puerperal fever.

In 1741, Brownrigg married Mary Spedding. Mary's father and uncle ran the collieries for James Lowther, whose family had developed Whitehaven into a major seaport. This increased William's local influence and also promoted his interest in the health and welfare of the miners.

Later in 1771, with the threat of an epidemic from Europe, Brownrigg who had studied the subject from outbreaks of typhus at Whitehaven, published a paper "Considerations on the means of pestilential contagion, and of Eradicating it in Infected Places."

== Scientist ==
His medical interest led him to investigate the gases the miners breathed – fire damp (methane) and choke damp (oxygen depleted air). Carlisle Spedding helped to build a laboratory for Brownrigg and fed it with gases from a nearby coal mine through lead pipes. Brownrigg developed methods of collecting and transferring the gases and supplied James Lowther with gas filled bladders to show to The Royal Society which then elected Brownrigg as a Fellow.

His experiments on gases continued and after visiting a spa resort in Germany he became interested in gases to be found in mineral waters. A paper he published entitled "Experimental inquiry concerning the nature of the mineral elastic spirit or air contained in the Pouhon water, and other acidulae" earned him the prestigious Copley Medal in 1766.

=== Discovery of platinum ===
In 1741, Brownrigg's relative, Charles Wood, a British metallurgist, found various samples of Colombian platinum in Jamaica, which he sent to Brownrigg for further investigation. In 1750, after studying the platinum sent to him by Wood, Brownrigg presented a detailed account of the metal to the Royal Society, stating that he had seen no mention of it in any previous accounts of known minerals. Brownrigg wrote up Wood's experiments and did some of his own. He was the first to recognise it as a new element and by bringing the new metal to the attention of The Royal Society encouraged other scientists to start investigating it.

=== Salt manufacture ===
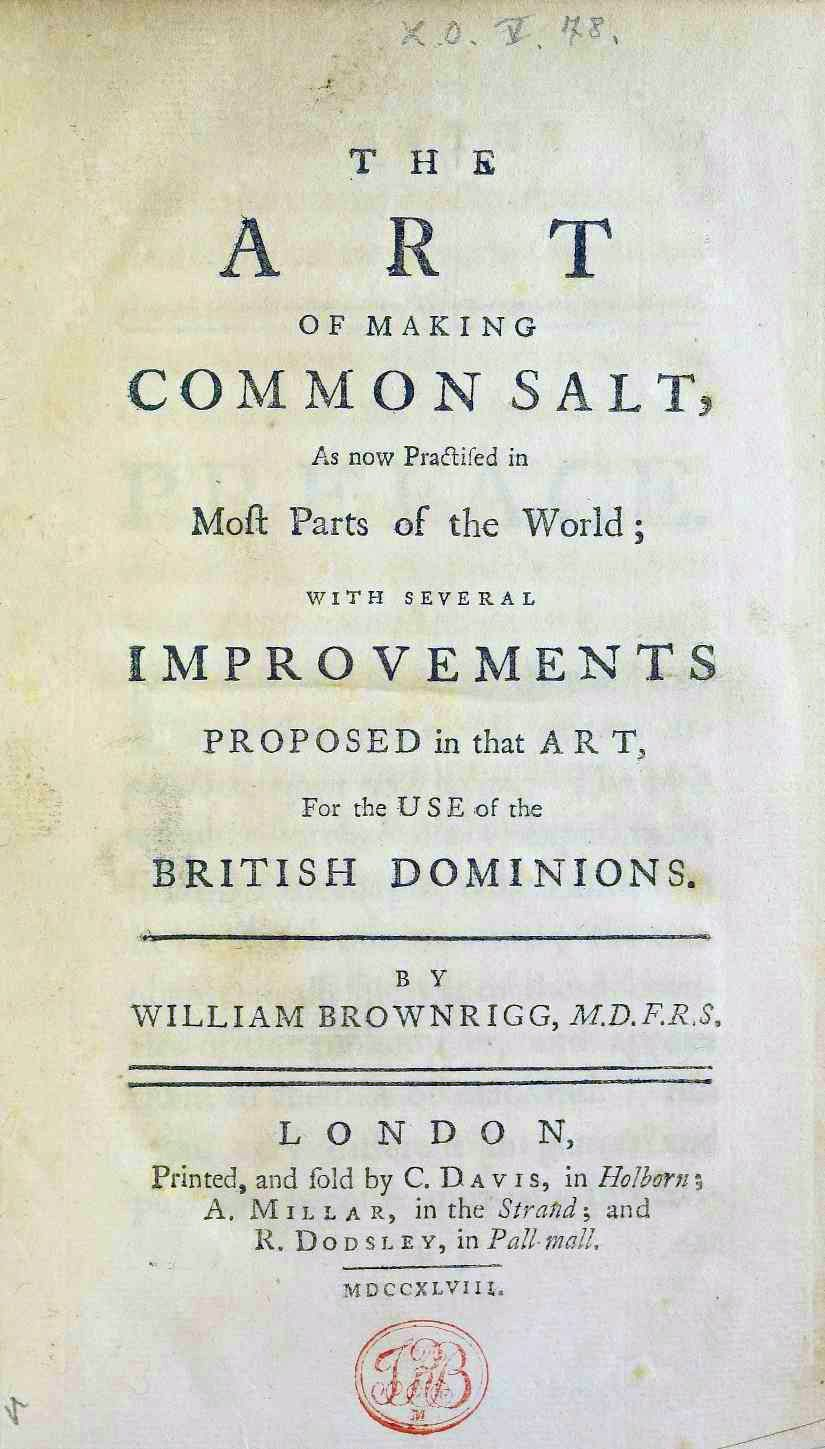
The Art of making common salt, 1748

Brownrigg also produced a major treatise on salt manufacture. He hoped that improved domestic production could make Britain self-sufficient in this valuable resource thereby improving the fishing industry and economy both in Britain and America. Much of the best quality salt was 'bay salt' produced in France and Spain; the two European powers with whom Britain was most likely to be at war with in the eighteenth century. When a paper based upon his book was read at the Royal Society in June 1748 (whilst the negotiations which were to lead to the peace treaty ending the War of the Austrian Succession were still under way), it was considered the most important paper read there in the last fifty years.

=== Franklin ===
In 1771 Benjamin Franklin was on a tour of Britain with Sir John Pringle who advised him to visit William Brownrigg. Franklin stayed at Brownrigg's home of Ormathwaite in the Lake District and was presented with a signed copy of his book on salt. Franklin demonstrated his experiment of adding oil to the water surface of Derwent Water to calm the waves. He later corresponded with Brownrigg on the subject leading to another paper for The Royal Society's transactions.

== Other interests ==
Brownrigg was a businessman as well as a doctor and scientist. He went into partnership with Anthony Bacon from Whitehaven in 1765 to develop the iron industry in Wales which led to the expansion of Merthyr Tydfil, particularly the Cyfarthfa Ironworks. He also inherited a share of John Speddings ropery and invested in the Keswick Turnpike Trust.

With his retirement to Ormathwaite, he became interested in improving the local agriculture, made a study of minerals, and encouraged Thomas West to write A Guide to the Lakes, the first guide book to the Lake District. He had several society positions including magistrate, Patent searcher at Port Carlisle and Receiver General of Government Taxes for Cumberland and Westmorland.

Brownrigg died in 1800 and was buried at Crosthwaite church where his coffin was carried by three baronets and other local gentry. His friend and biographer Joshua Dixon felt that his importance and abilities had been overlooked due to his modesty and reluctance to leave his home county of Cumberland in later life.

== Publications ==
- The Art of making common salt. London: Charles Davis. 1748.
