= Aberfan Cemetery =

Municipal cemetery in Merthyr Tydfil County Borough, Wales

Coordinates: 51°41′29″N 3°20′53″W

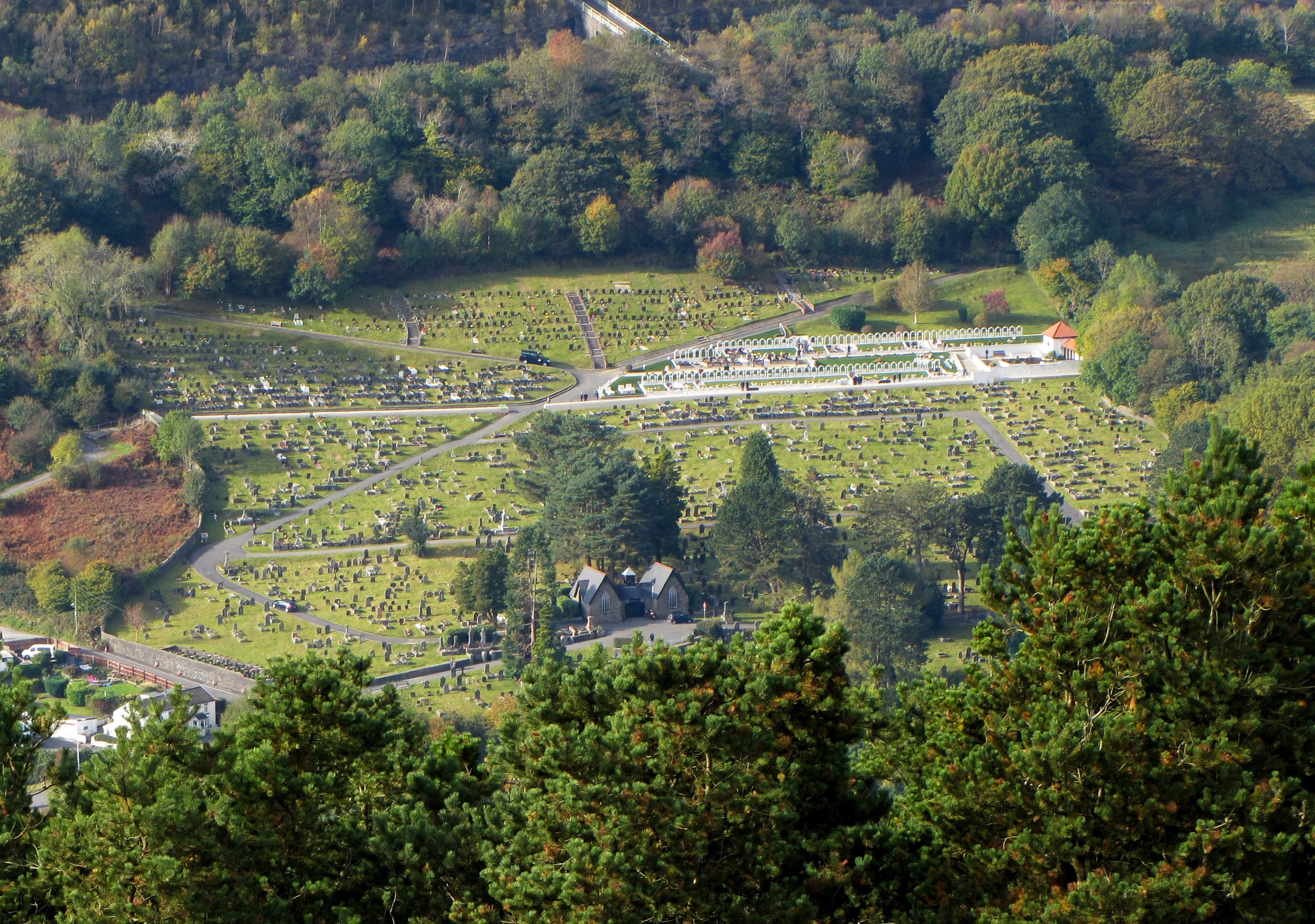
Aerial view of Aberfan Cemetery

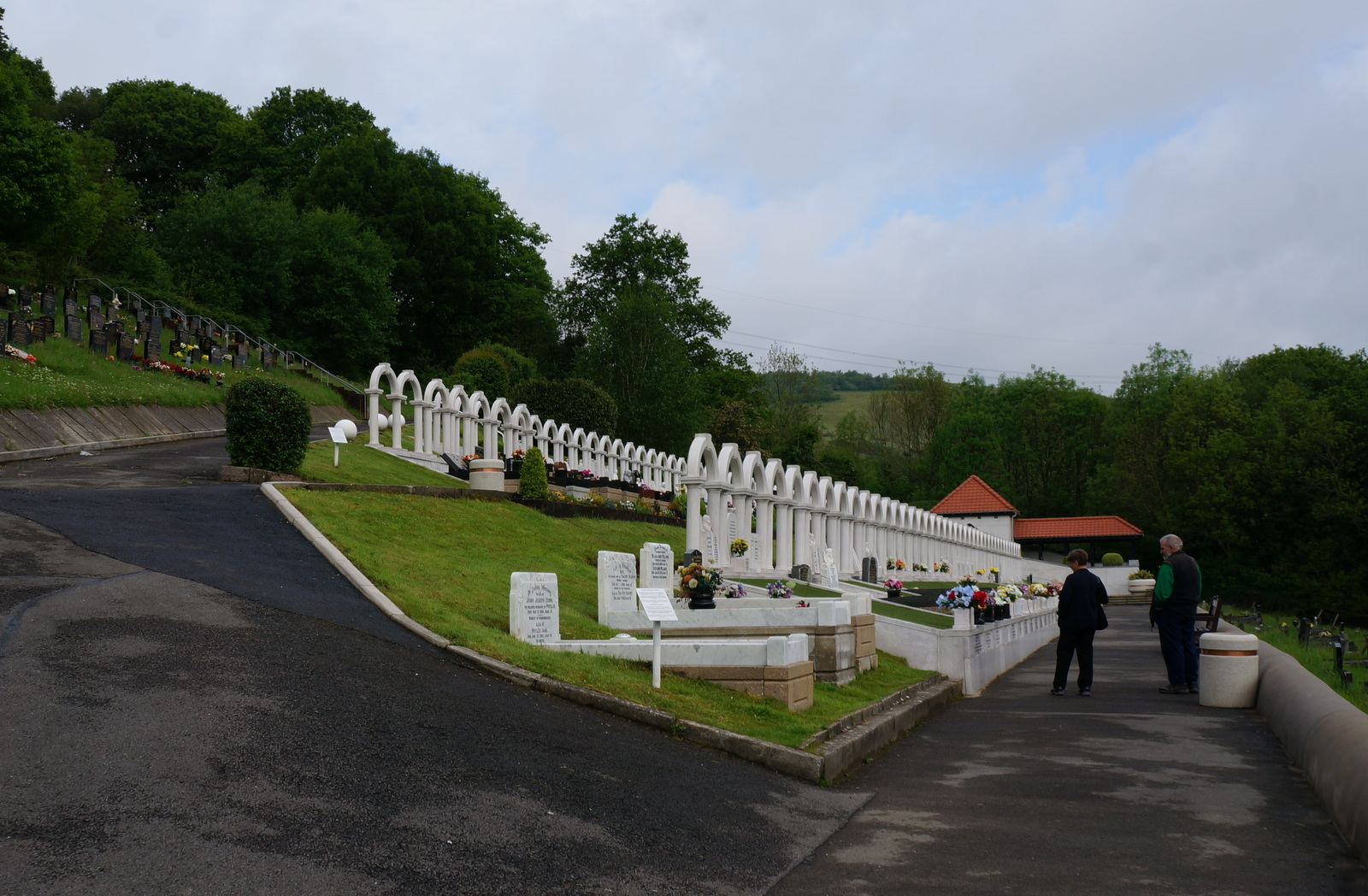
The Children's cemetery, where children killed in the Aberfan disaster are buried.

Aberfan Cemetery (Welsh: Mynwent Aberfan) is a cemetery near the village of Aberfan, Merthyr Tydfil. It is one of five cemeteries in Merthyr Tydfil County Borough and is particularly well known for the graves of 144 victims of the Aberfan disaster in 1966, when a colliery coal tip collapsed and killed many people in the village of Aberfan.

The cemetery was opened in 1876 and includes Bryntaf Cemetery, an extension opened in 1913. It covers approximately 8 acres (3 hectares). The cemetery is Green Flag accredited. In 2022, the cemetery, together with the memorial garden and the area of the tip and its slide path, was listed on the Cadw/ICOMOS Register of Parks and Gardens of Special Historic Interest in Wales. The record of the Grade II* listed site describes it as being "of great national importance and meaning".

As well as a monument to the Aberfan disaster victims, there is also a military monument to seven soldiers who drowned in the Bristol Channel in 1888. There are also Commonwealth war graves from both World Wars: 12 within Aberfan Cemetery proper and 18 within Bryntaf Cemetery.
