= James Cockshutt =

English footballer

Personal information
- Full name: James William Cockshutt
- Date of birth: 1872
- Place of birth: Darwen, England
- Date of death: 13 April 1938 (aged 65–66)
- Position: Forward

Senior career*
Years	Team	Apps	(Gls)
1891–1892	Blackburn Rovers	1	(0)
1892–1893	Brierfield		
1893–1894	Burnley	0	(0)
1894–1897	Nelson		
1897–1898	Reading		
1898–1900	Grimsby Town	61	(21)
1900–190?	Nelson		
- * Club domestic league appearances and goals

James William Cockshutt (1872 – 13 April 1938) was an English professional footballer who played as a forward.
