= William Crawshay I =

British industrialist (1764–1834)

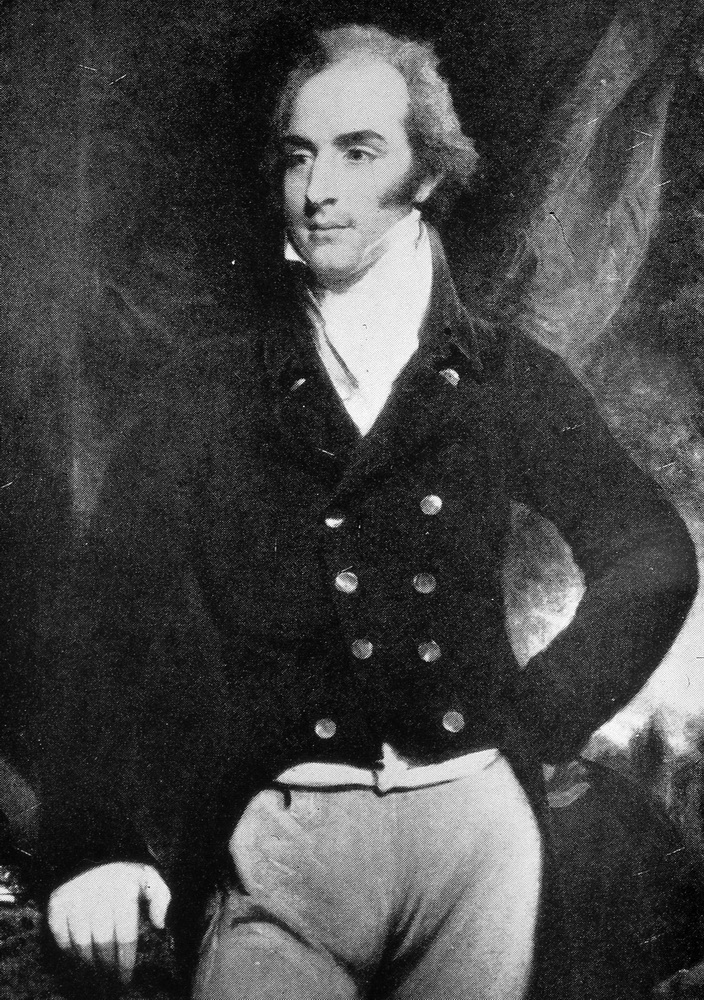

William Crawshay (1764 – 11 August 1834) was a British industrialist. Born in South Wales, he spent most of his life in London.

He was the only surviving son of Richard Crawshay, one of the richest men in the United Kingdom. He had three sisters, including Charlotte, who married Benjamin Hall, also an industrialist, making William Crawshay the uncle of Sir Benjamin Hall, politician and reformer.

William took over the Cyfarthfa Ironworks from his father, but it was never his primary concern, and he continued to live in London, where he took charge of the company's selling agency. He already had trading interests in India and had only taken a role in the business because of the death of his elder brother. After his father's death in 1810, he left the running of the works mostly in the hands of his own son, William Crawshay II, and died at Stoke Newington aged 70, leaving a fortune of £700,000.
