= Potting and stamping =

Potting and stamping is a modern name for one of the 18th-century processes for refining pig iron without the use of charcoal.

== Inventors ==
The process was devised by Charles Wood of Lowmill, Egremont in Cumberland and his brother John Wood of Wednesbury and patented by them in 1761 and 1763. The process was improved by John Wright and Joseph Jesson of West Bromwich, who also obtained a patent.

== Process ==
The process involved the melting of pig iron in an oxidising atmosphere. The metal was then allowed to cool, broken up by stamping, and washed. The granulated iron was then heated in pots in a reverberatory furnace. The resultant bloom was then drawn out under a forge hammer in the usual way.

== Adoption ==
During the 14-year term of the patents, the process was little used except by the inventors. However, from c.1785, shortly before Wright & Jesson's process came out of patent, it seems to have been adopted by many ironmasters in the West Midlands. Professor Charles Hyde argues that the potting and stamping process was largely responsible for a 70% rise in wrought iron production from 1750 to 1788.

Ultimately, the process was replaced by puddling, though it remains unclear how quickly.
