= Cyfarthfa Castle =

- Castell Cyfarthfa
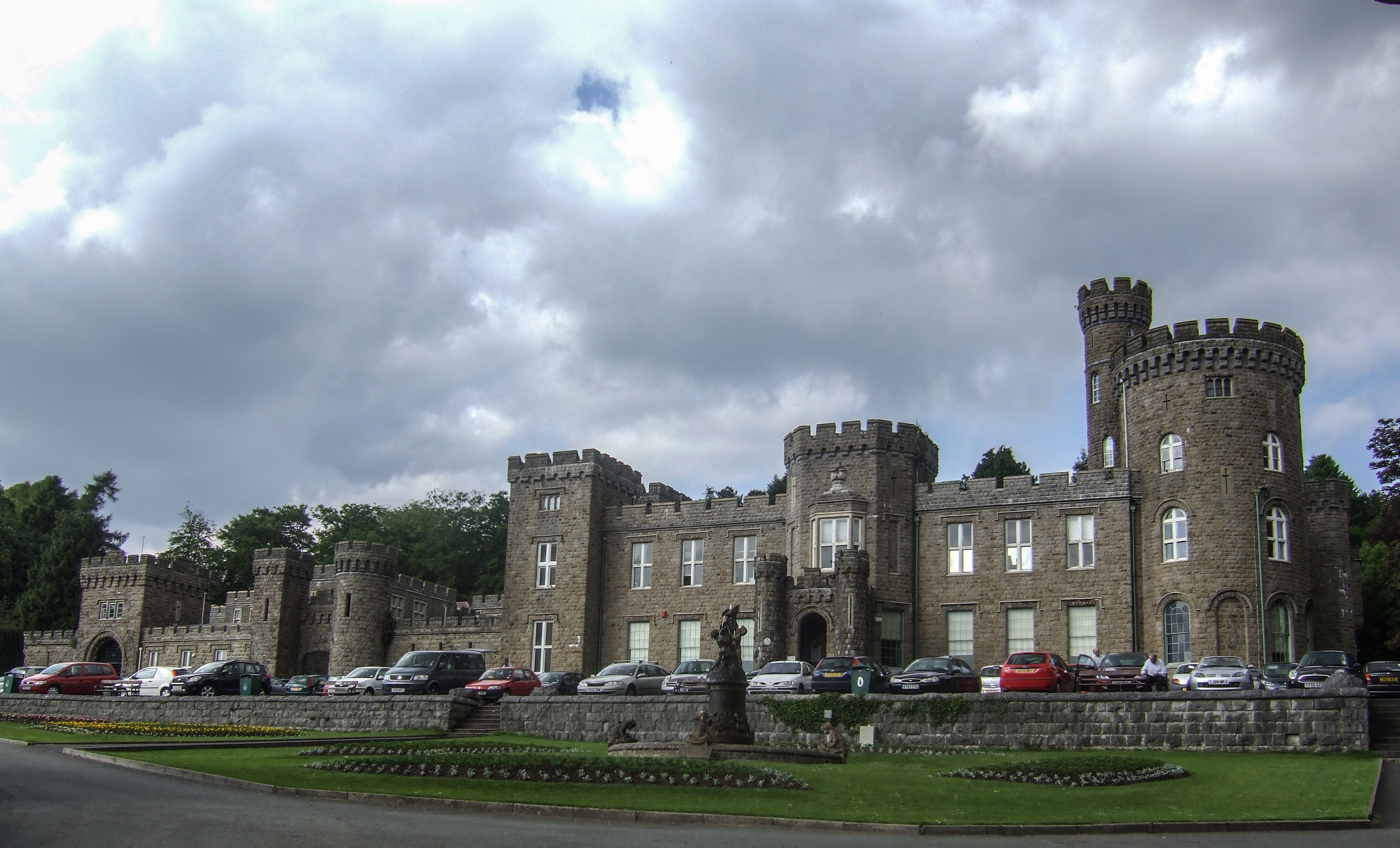
- Front view of Cyfarthfa Castle

- Location within Merthyr Tydfil
- Established: 1824
- Location: Park, Merthyr Tydfil, Wales
- Coordinates: 51.75666°N 3.39014°W
- Type: Historic house museum, art museum
- Architect: Robert Lugar
- Owner: Merthyr Tydfil County Borough Council
- Website: www.cyfarthfa.co.uk

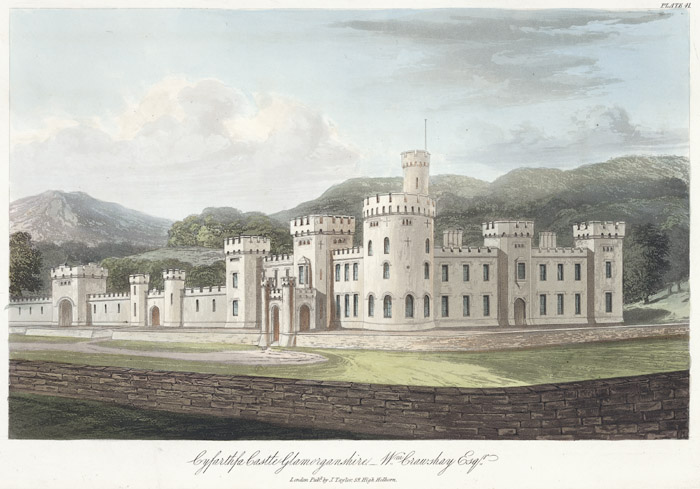
Cyfarthfa Castle, c.1840

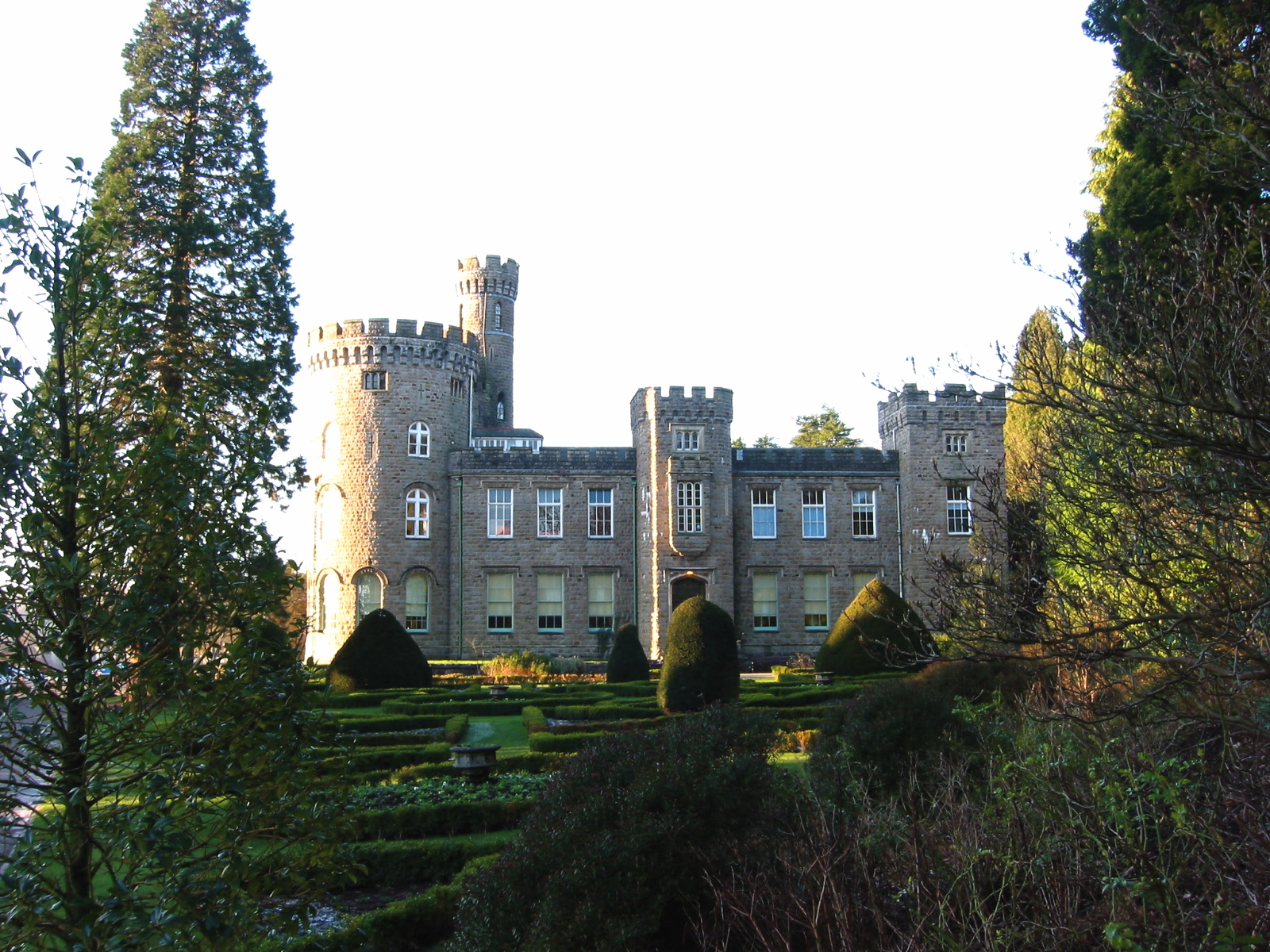
Cyfarthfa Castle, commissioned in 1819 by the ironmaster William Crawshay

Cyfarthfa Castle (Welsh: Castell Cyfarthfa; [kəˈvarθva]) is a castellated mansion that was the home of the Crawshay family, ironmasters of Cyfarthfa Ironworks in Park, Merthyr Tydfil, Wales. The house commanded a view of the valley and the works, which ‘at night, offer a truly magnificent scene, resembling the fabled Pandemonium, but on which the eye may gaze with pleasure’. Cyfarthfa loosely translates from the Welsh for place of barking. The reason is hunting dogs were regularly heard in this area of the town, hunting polecats and weasels among others.

Despite appearing to be a fortified building, it is a house built in the style of a large mansion with a large kitchen, bake house and dairy, billiard room, library, and a range of reception rooms. In addition, there is a brew house, icehouse and extensive storage cellars that used to contain over 15,000 individual bottles of wines and spirits such as Sherry, Champagne, Whisky, Brandy, Madeira Wine, and over 7,500 bottles of port. Adjoining the building were also stable blocks and coach houses. The castle stands in 158-acre (64 ha) of parkland, now called Cyfarthfa Park and maintained by Merthyr Tydfil County Borough Council. The park is listed on the Cadw/ICOMOS Register of Parks and Gardens of Special Historic Interest in Wales.

== History ==
The castle was designed in 1824 by the architect Robert Lugar for William Crawshay II, and built at a cost of approximately £30,000 using locally quarried stone. The castle has 15 towers and 72 rooms. The mistress of the house was Rose Mary Crawshay from 1846 to the death of her husband in 1889. She lived until 1907 but made her home elsewhere.

The castle was sold in 1908 to the local council, who were initially unsure as to what purpose it should be put. Eventually, they decided to use part of the ground floor for a museum, which still operates. The museum includes paintings, including two by James Inskipp. The rest of the building became a secondary school, and it was opened in 1913, operating as separate boys' and girls' schools. In 1945, they amalgamated, and in accordance with government policy the school was redesignated as a Grammar school under the name of Cyfarthfa Castle Grammar School. It became a comprehensive school in 1970, under the name Cyfarthfa High School.

The Entrance Hall is one of the most elegant rooms of the house and this is where the shop and reception area are located. Much of the decoration has a mock-Tudor feel; the small shields around the frieze, the tall pillars round the windows, huge Gothic doors and the superb red and clear glass windows that fill the rear of the hall, all add to the imposing grandeur. When the house was completed in 1825, the hall was the largest room and was, undoubtedly, the room in which the Crawshays held any large functions. It remained the largest room in the house until the school – which occupied the vast majority of the building from 1913 – knocked smaller rooms into one and created large halls. The ceiling depicts the white rose of Yorkshire, the original home of the Crawshay family.

In December 1997, the castle was one of the proposed sites for the location of the Senedd Welsh Parliament building. The castle would have likely seen huge renovations in order to see the construction of the Y Siambr chamber and relevant government offices, including that of the First Minister of Wales. However, following debate by the government, the site was rejected.

== Facilities and events ==
Cyfarthfa Park is listed at Grade II* on the Cadw/ICOMOS Register of Parks and Gardens of Special Historic Interest in Wales. It has acres of walks and a miniature steam railway run by Merthyr Tydfil Model Engineering Society since 1987. Canolfan Cyfarthfa, a conference center, is also in the park. It has function rooms and a seasonal café, a children's playground complete with a ‘Splash Pad’, a 9-hole golf course, bowling grounds and tennis courts, and a fishing lake. The park also hosts events throughout the year such as car shows, horse shows and concerts.

On 30 June 2007, Donny Osmond, who traces his family history to Merthyr Tydfil, performed the 'Donny Comes Home' concert in the park grounds. The concert was attended by 15,000 people despite unseasonably heavy rain. On 26 July 2008, Status Quo performed in the park grounds.

The Museum and Art Gallery are set in restored Regency rooms and contain a superb collection of family memorabilia, fine and decorative art, curios from around the world and social history material.

The Playroom is the Castle's temporary exhibition space. When the Crawshay family lived there the room had a very different purpose. This was one of several rooms that were solely for use of the Crawshay children, hence the name Playroom. William Crawshay had many children and he adored having his children close, which is why all the children's areas of the house surround his office. The Playroom hosts a wide variety of temporary exhibitions each year, from contemporary and classical art exhibitions, to community and social history exhibitions.

== Bibliography ==
- Margaret Stewart Taylor – The Crawshays of Cyfarthfa Castle: A family history (1967)
- Roderick Thomas – Cyfarthfa and the Crawshays (1999)
- Cyfarthfa Castle Museum and Art Gallery – Cyfarthfa Castle Museum and Art Gallery (2014)
