= Plymouth Ironworks =

Industrial plant in South Wales

Coordinates: 51.7352°N 3.3696°W

The Plymouth Ironworks was a major 18th- and 19th-century ironworks located on land leased from the Earl of Plymouth at Merthyr Tydfil, in South Wales. The metal produced was considered to be the finest in South Wales.

The Ironworks was established by John Guest and Isaac Wilkinson in 1763, but the venture was unsuccessful and transferred to Anthony Bacon in 1765. On his death in 1788, Richard Hill became the owner. Anthony Hill, a later owner, adopted the Bessemer process. On his death in 1862, the company was taken over by Fothergill, Hankey, and Bateman until its closure in 1882.
