= William Crawshay II =

British ironmaster (1788–1867)

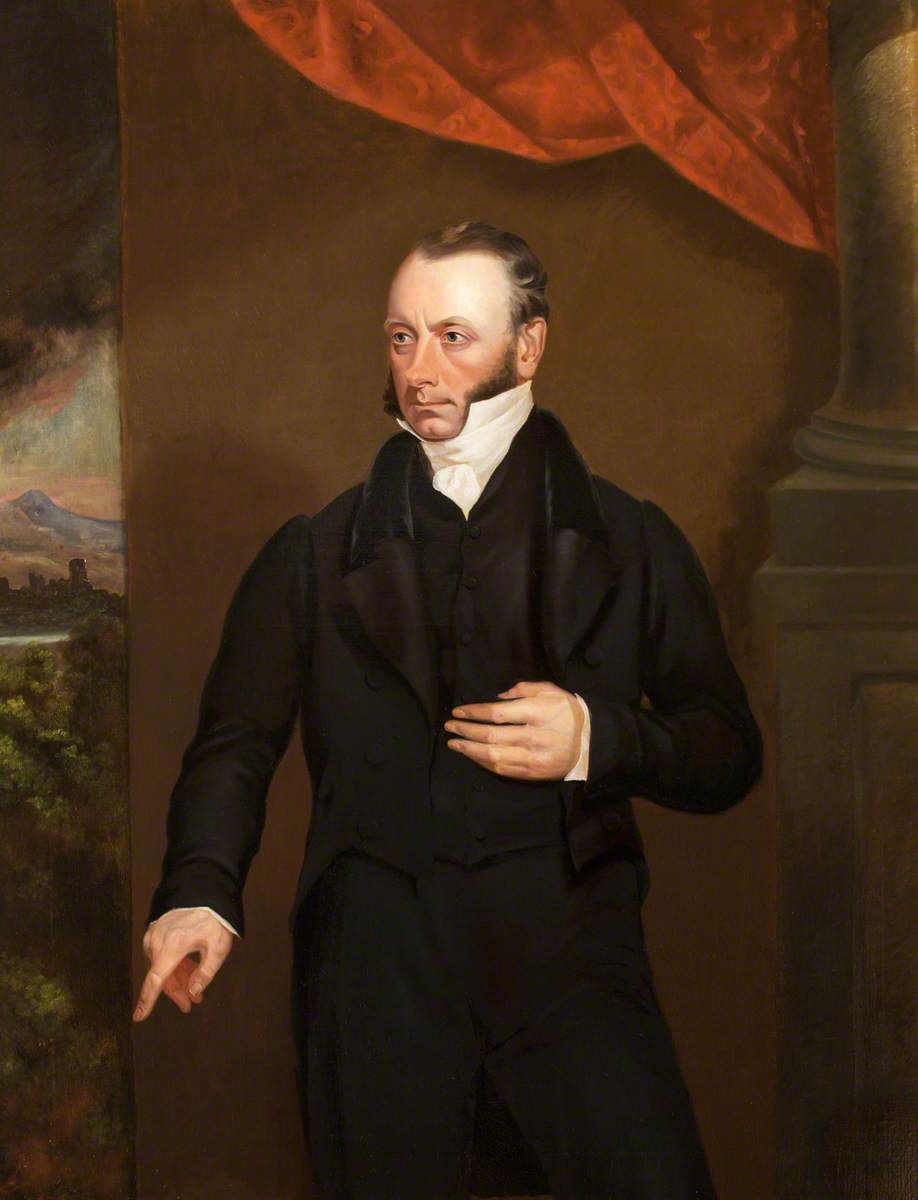
Portrait of William Crawshay II

William Crawshay II (27 March 1788 – 4 August 1867) was the son of William Crawshay I, the owner of Cyfarthfa Ironworks in Merthyr Tydfil, Wales.

William Crawshay II became an ironmaster when he took over the business from his father. He was known as the 'Iron King'. He was considered a hard master by some, and his employees took part in the protests that led to the Merthyr Rising of 1831.

He was responsible for the building of Cyfarthfa Castle (now a museum) in the 1820s. In 1847, he retired to Caversham Park in Oxfordshire (now Berkshire), where he died 20 years later. After a fire in 1850, Caversham Park was rebuilt by Crawshay to a design by Horace Jones who much later also designed London's Tower Bridge.

His son, Robert Thompson Crawshay, carried on the South Wales business.
