= Bethesda =

Bethesda originally referred to the Pool of Bethesda, a pool in Jerusalem, described in the New Testament story of the healing the paralytic at Bethesda.

Bethesda may also refer to:

== Places ==
=== Antigua and Barbuda ===
- Bethesda, Antigua and Barbuda

=== Canada ===
- Bethesda, Simcoe County, Ontario, Canada
- Bethesda, York Regional Municipality, Ontario, Canada

=== South Africa ===
- Nieu-Bethesda, South Africa

=== Suriname ===
- Bethesda, Suriname, a former leper colony

=== United Kingdom ===
- Bethesda, Gwynedd, Wales
  - Bethesda Athletic F.C.
  - Bethesda RFC, a rugby union team
- Bethesda, Pembrokeshire, Wales

=== United States ===
- Bethesda, Arkansas
- Bethesda, Chatham County, Georgia
- Bethesda, Greene County, Georgia
- Bethesda, Davidson County, North Carolina
- Bethesda, Durham County, North Carolina
- Bethesda, Iowa
- Bethesda, Maryland
  - Bethesda station, a Washington Metro station in Bethesda, Maryland
  - Bethesda Naval Hospital (now Walter Reed National Military Medical Center)
- Bethesda (Ellicott City, Maryland), a plantation house
- Bethesda, Ohio
- Bethesda, Pennsylvania
- Bethesda, Tennessee
- Bethesda, West Virginia
- Bethesda, Wisconsin
- Bethesda Terrace and Fountain, with the Angel of the Waters statue in New York City's Central Park
- Bethesda Academy, Savannah, Georgia

== Other uses ==
- Bethesda system, a classification system for thyroid neoplasia, named after the town in Maryland
- Bethesda Softworks, a video games publishing company, named after the town in Maryland
  - Bethesda Game Studios, Bethesda Softworks' in-house video game development company
- Bethesda units, used to measure blood anticoagulant activity

== See also ==
- Bethesda Chapel (disambiguation)
- Bethesda Church (disambiguation)
- Bethesda Hospital (disambiguation)
- Bethsaida (disambiguation)
