= Bethesda Presbyterian Church =

Bethesda Presbyterian Church may refer to:

- Bethesda Presbyterian Church (Edwards, Mississippi)
- Bethesda Presbyterian Church (Aberdeen, North Carolina)
- Bethesda Presbyterian Church (Houstonville, North Carolina)
- Bethesda Presbyterian Church (Camden, South Carolina)
- Bethesda Presbyterian Church (McConnells, South Carolina)
- Bethesda Presbyterian Church (Russellville, Tennessee)

== See also ==
- Bethesda Church (disambiguation)
- Bethesda Meeting House, Bethesda, Maryland
