= Bethesda Hospital =

Bethesda Hospital may refer to:

- Bethesda Hospital (Ambur), Ambur, India
- Bethesda Hospital (North Hornell, New York), a twentieth-century hospital
- Bethesda Hospital (Saint Paul, Minnesota), United States
- Bethesda Hospital (Yogyakarta), Indonesia
- Bethesda Naval Hospital, Maryland, United States
- Bethesda North Hospital, Montgomery, Ohio, United States
- Bethesda Oak Hospital (formerly Bethesda Hospital), Cincinnati, Ohio, United States

== See also ==
- Bethesda (disambiguation)
