= Rillington Manor =

Manor house in Rillington, North Yorkshire, England

Coordinates: 54°09′49″N 0°41′24″W

Rillington Manor is a historic building in Rillington, a village in North Yorkshire, in England.

The house was built in 1913, for Wilfred Henry Hudleston. It was designed by Sidney Kitson, in the neo-Georgian style, and is accessed by a tree-lined driveway. The house was grade II listed in 1986.

The country house in built of red brick with a sill band, a mutule cornice, overhanging sprocketed eaves, and hipped pantile roofs. It has two storeys with attics and five bays, the outer bays on the front projecting and with quoins, and a single-storey range on the left. The centre range has a full-height round-arched arcade, a central doorway with pilaster jambs, and an open pediment with a cartouche and a motto in the tympanum. The windows are sashes under varying arches, and there are dormers in the attics with volutes between the sashes. The garden front has full-height canted bay windows in the outer bays, and a single-storey glazed loggia with Doric columns. Inside, the original plasterwork and wood panelling survives, along with the original doors and staircase, which is in the style of 1700.

The stable block is also grade II listed, and is also built of red brick, with rusticated quoins, an impost band, bracketed eaves and a hipped pantile roof. It has a single storey, and a flat arch in the centre flanked by three-bay blind arcades, each bay containing a lunette. Above, are two flat dormers, the one on the left between volutes.

== See also ==
- Listed buildings in Rillington
