= Bethesda Hospital (Ambur) =

- Bethesda Hospital Council

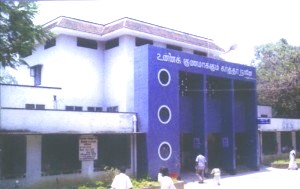
- "House of Mercy"

Geography
- Location: Ambur, Vellore, Tamil Nadu, India
- Coordinates: 12.78°N 78.72°E

Organisation
- Type: Teaching
- Affiliated university: Indian Nursing Council

Services
- Speciality: Multi-speciality

History
- Founded: 1921; 105 years ago

Links
- Website: www.bethesdahospitalambur.org
- Lists: Hospitals in India

Bethesda Hospital is a multi-speciality hospital situated in Ambur in the south Indian state of Tamil Nadu. It serves the taluk and the adjoining areas of Ambur.

== History ==
J. Deoderlein, a Christian missionary from The Lutheran Church Missouri Synod-LCMS, United States, offered such a comprehensive care in Ambur as early as 1907. A bullock cart was used to provide medical services to the areas surrounding Ambur which was used as a mobile clinic. Later in 1921, a 16-bedded Hospital was started by the efforts of Dr. Th. Doederlein, an eminent Chicago physician and Two American trained nurses, Miss. Angela Rehwinkel and Miss. Etta Herold. This spark was slow but steady which in later 1986, with a dedicated team of doctors from CMCH Vellore led by Dr A S FENN was envisaged as a multispeciality hospital providing secondary level health care to majority of poor and middle class society in and around Ambur without discrimination of caste, creed and religion.

Bethesda Hospital is situated in Ambur town, with a population of more than one lakh and is surrounded by approximately 60 village hamlets. The hospital housed in a campus area of 35 acres serves the health need of very large segment of the rural populations. Patients come from the nearby larger towns such as Vaniyambadi, Pernambut, Gudiyattam, Jolarpet, Natrampalli and Tirupattur. People from socially backward areas from districts like Salem, Dharmapuri, Krishnagiri and Kuppam also benefit from this hospital. Also service through community Health Programmes at Nayakkaneri and Kattukollai – hill stations reach the people from the interior.

== Background ==
Bethesda comes from a Hebrew word meaning “House of Mercy”. In Jewish belief, it was a name given to a pool, that when stirred by an angel produced ailment to those who first entered it thereafter. Miss. Angela Rehwinkle and Dr. Dodelein, who founded the hospital chose the name 'Bethesda' to signify the healing that would take place at this hospital. During the early years, Miss. Angela Rehwinkle managed the hospital by her. Subsequently, dedicated doctors Mr. J.C. Williams, Mr. Kalyan, Mr. Eapen Benjamin and Mr. Nallathambi adjoined her for this noble cause.

In 1950 Dr.W.F.Bulle a surgeon, through his services enlisted the support of the Wheat Ridge Foundation to sponsor a Tuberculosis control project within the municipal limits of Ambur. The Ambur municipality donated Rs.1,00,000 towards this tuberculosis project.

A Leprosy programme was started in the outskirts of Ambur serving up to Pallikonda. This was started with 4 paramedical workers and financial support from the German Leprosy Relief Association (GLRA) based in Chennai.

After years of services, Dr. A.S. Fenn, a surgeon, together with a team of physicians notably Dr. Malati Jadhav, an eminent pediatrician, transformed this traditional mission hospital into multispeciality Health Care Center.

== Infrastructure ==
The hospital being multi speciality caters to various medical needs of the people including General Medicine, Pediatrics, Surgery, Obstetrics & Gynecology, Orthopedic Surgery, Pediatric Surgery, Neuro surgery, Anaesthesia, Otolaryngology, Ophthalmology, Radiology, Dentistry, Physiotherapy and Dietary departments. Laboratory services including Biochemistry, Microbiology and Clinical Pathology and Pharmacy services are available to the access round the clock. Dialysis Unit, HIV/AIDS Care and Support Programmes further add significance for this centre. Trauma Care Unit are available 24 hours. Medical Records Department streamline the patients to the respective departments for immediate action. Apart from this Blood bank is operational. Proposed additions include setting up of Corporate cell, "Golden Hour" Mobile Coronary Care Unit and installation of CT scan facilities.

== Community health and development ==
Bethesda Hospital's community health programs are innumerable. It has been the tradition of this hospital since its inception to arrange community health programs. Many such programs have been and now sponsored by various Governments. Some of them include:

- Family Planning
- Infant Care Programme
- Leprosy Control Programme
- Tuberculosis Control Programme
- Urban Community Health Programmes
- Rural Community Health Programmes
- Blood bank
- Integrated Child Care Project (ICCP)
- The Community Care Project
- The Care and Treatment programme of APAC
- Integrated Counseling and Testing Center (ICTC)
- Prevention of Mother to Child Transmission

Out of the above, Leprosy Control Programme and Tuberculosis Control Programme were mainly taken care by the Bethesda Hospital. Cases with deformity in Leprosy are referred to the hand surgery to the Schefflin Research Hospital at Karigiri.

== Bethesda School of Nursing ==
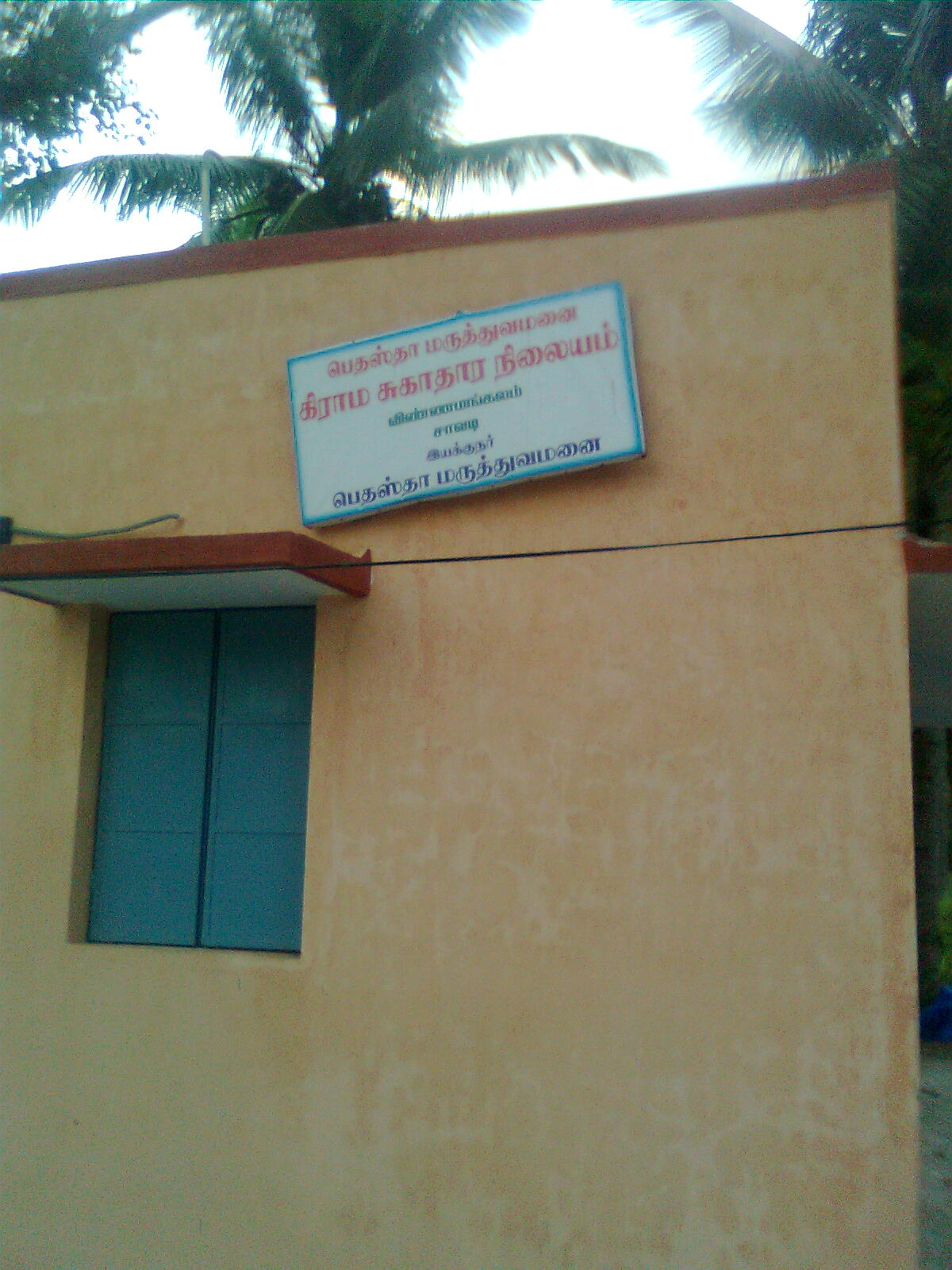
Village Health Station, Vinnamangalam

The School of Nursing was started in 1997 with an intake of 20 students every year with the recognition from Indian Nursing Council. Diploma course in general nursing and midwifery is offered in this school. The students of this school are actively involving in Community Health Programmes in the surroundings rural villages and urban slums. Regular visits, ante-natal and post natal care to the mothers, referral services, counseling, periodical medical camps, awareness camps, immunization camps, and training of volunteers in the community are taken care by the students. They have also adopted a village nearby named Vinnamangalam. Around 200 students have completed and got placements in different places in this country and abroad.

== See also ==
- Ambur
- Christian Medical College & Hospital
- India Evangelical Lutheran Church
