= Bethesda Chapel =

Bethesda Chapel may refer to:

- Bethesda Chapel, Abercwmboi, Rhondda Cynon Taf, Wales
- Bethesda Chapel, Dublin, Ireland
- Bethesda Methodist Chapel, Hanley, Staffordshire, England
- Bethesda Chapel, Merthyr Tydfil, South Wales
- Bethesda Chapel, Rillington, North Yorkshire, England
- Bethesda Chapel, Bethesda, North Wales

== See also ==
- Bethesda Church (disambiguation)
