= Bethesda Church =

Bethesda Church may refer to:

== Churches ==
- Bethesda-by-the-Sea, Palm Beach, Florida
- Bethesda Meeting House, Bethesda, Maryland
- Bethesda Baptist Church and Cemetery, Greene County, Georgia
- Bethesda Episcopal Church (Saratoga Springs), New York
- Bethesda Methodist Protestant Church, Brinkleyville, North Carolina

== Other uses ==
- Battle of Bethesda Church, during the American Civil War

== See also ==
- Bethesda Chapel (disambiguation)
- Bethesda Presbyterian Church (disambiguation)
