= Morlais Castle =

13th century castle in Merthyr Tydfil County Borough, Wales

- Castell Morlais
- Merthyr Tydfil, Wales, United Kingdom

Location
- Coordinates: 51°46′37″N 3°22′45″W

Morlais Castle is a 13th-century castle located above the Taff Gorge near the town of Merthyr Tydfil in Wales.

== History ==
Building of the castle was first begun by Gilbert de Clare, 3rd Earl of Gloucester on land claimed by Humphrey de Bohun, 3rd Earl of Hereford. Warfare broke out between the Earls in 1290 and they were severely admonished and fined by King Edward I of England, who had to march down from North Wales to intervene. The castle was captured by Madog ap Llywelyn in 1294. The castle is believed to have never been fully completed, and the location was too remote and exposed to serve as a residence. The Bucks' engraving of 1741, however, shows that fragments of the walls then still stood high.

== Description ==
The castle comprised a triangular inner ward with sides about 45m long and an inner bailey 60m wide. The inner ward had a round keep 17m in diameter at the north corner, a D-shaped tower with a staircase on the north side at the SE corner, and a similar tower projected from the south wall. Between the latter two was the gateway. On the west side was a freestanding building about 25m long. It was joined to the south tower by an almost square building. In front of the south tower is a deep pit, presumably the cistern. The outer ward has no towers on the west side, but there is a D-shaped tower at the south-east corner. The latter has a rib-vaulted basement with a central pier and a sharply pointed doorway. Against the east curtain was a large and thickly walled building over 20m long, and on the west is a smaller building. Little remains today, though, with only one room still intact in what would have been the bottom of the main keep, and small walls around the castle give us an idea of where it once stood. The moat stretches around most of the castle, although one side has vanished; this may be because of the lime quarry located there. The 18-hole Morlais Castle golf course is located to one side of the castle.

== Gallery ==
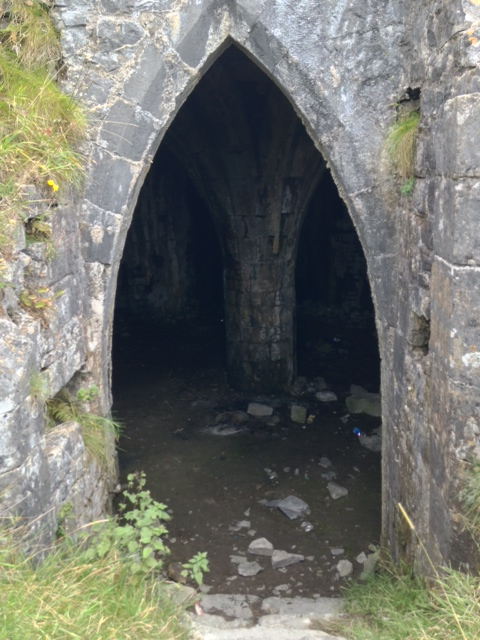
View of some internal features of remaining room at Morlais Castle

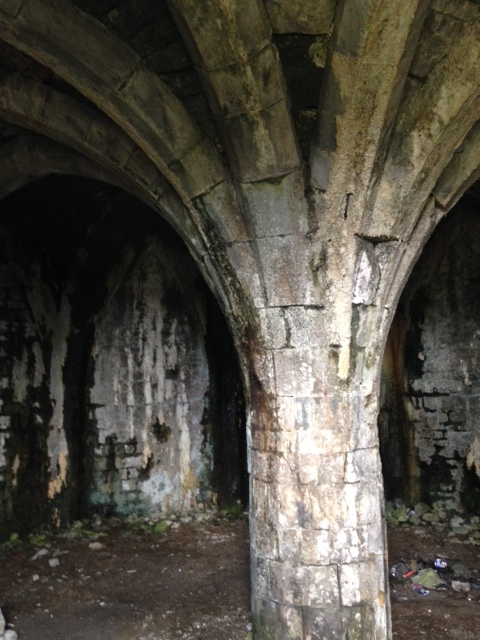
Morlais Castle Internal Room

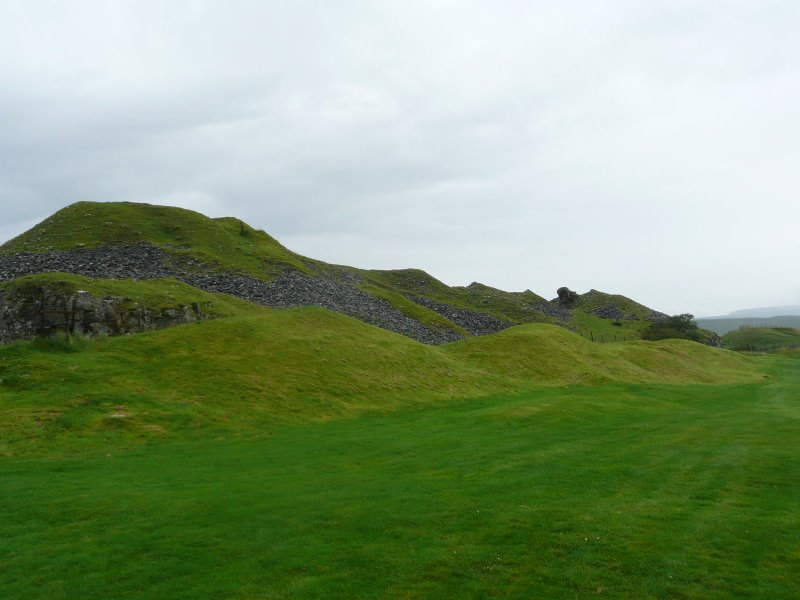
external view of the only remaining room at Morlais castle.

== See also ==
- List of castles in Wales
- Castles in Great Britain and Ireland
