= Bethsaida (disambiguation) =

Bethsaida is a Biblical location

Bethsaida may also refer to:

- Bethsaida Valley

== See also ==
- Bethesda (disambiguation)
