= Bethesda, Chatham County, Georgia =

Unincorporated community in Georgia, U.S.

Coordinates: 31°57′48″N 81°05′38″W

Bethesda is an unincorporated community in Chatham County, in the U.S. state of Georgia.

== History ==
The community took its name from an orphanage, now known as Bethesda Academy, established at the site.
