= Bethesda Chapel, Rillington =

Chapel in Rillington, North Yorkshire, England

Coordinates: 54.1581°N 0.6951°W

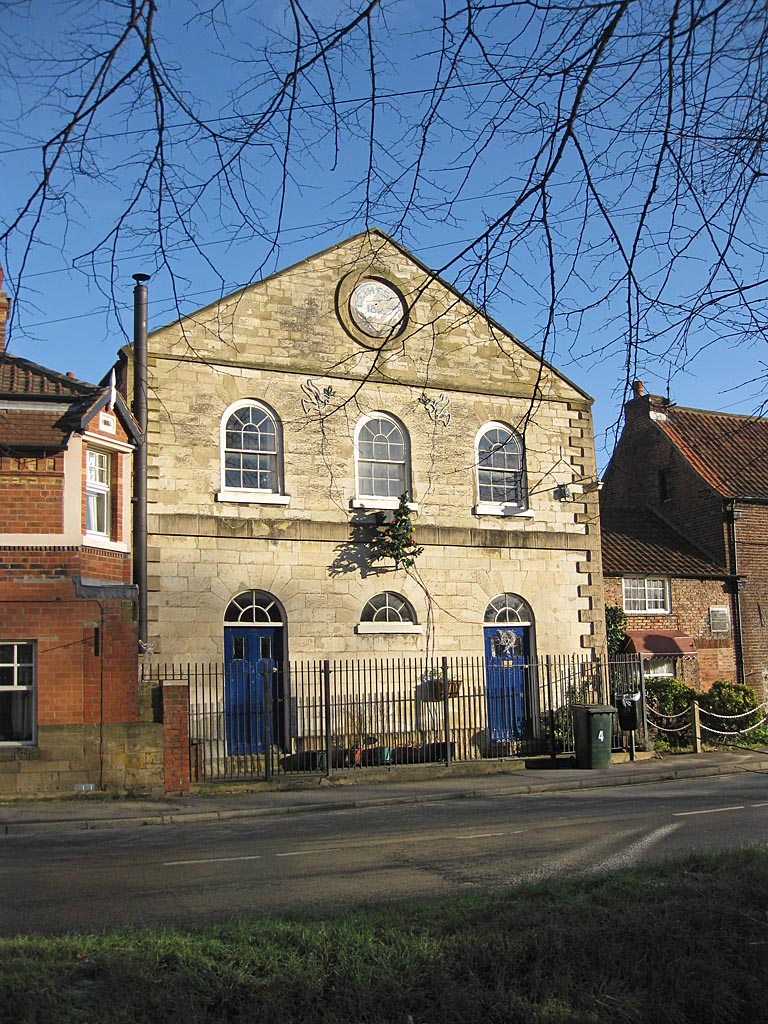
The building, in 2011

The Bethesda Chapel is a historic building in Rillington, a village in North Yorkshire, in England.

George Sykes was a preacher with the Wesleyan Methodist Church, but in the 1810s left the church. In 1818, he established a Congregationalist chapel in Rillington. The building was restored in 1875, and the chapel was active until 1989, following which it was converted into a house. The building has been grade II listed since 1966.

The chapel is built of limestone on a sandstone plinth, with sandstone dressings, quoins and a pantile roof. The front has two storeys and three bays, and is gabled with the date in a roundel. The ground floor contains two round-headed windows of voussoirs flanking a lunette, and on the upper floor are three round-headed windows. Along the sides are lunettes under semicircular arches, and a paired modillion eaves course.

== See also ==
- Listed buildings in Rillington
