= Vinnamangalam =

- Village
- Location in Tamil Nadu, India Vinnamangalam (India)
- Coordinates: 12.740116°N 78.691898°E
- Country: India
- State: Tamil Nadu
- District: Tirupattur

Languages
  - Official: Tamil
- Time zone: UTC+5:30 (IST)
- PIN: 635807
- Telephone code: 91-4174
- Nearest city: Vellore
- Climate: hot

Vinnamangalam is a village in Tirupathur district of Tamil Nadu State, India. Alankuppam, Kannadikuppam, Periyankuppam, Veerankuppam, Nacharkuppam,minnur are the nearby villages within 1–2 km radius. Tamil is the local language in the village. Kennedy College Of Hotel Management And Catering Technology (a self-financed polytechnic) is located in Agaramcheri, nearby Vinnamangalam. Vinnamangalam and Ambur train stations are the nearby railway stations to Vinnamangalam. However, Katpadi junction is the major railway station 59 km near to Vinnamangalam.

Temples

Sridevi Bhoomadevi samethe Sri Amarntha Sundhararaja Perumal Kovil
