= Merthyr Tydfil =

Town in Wales

Merthyr Tydfil: Welsh: Merthyr Tudful
- Town
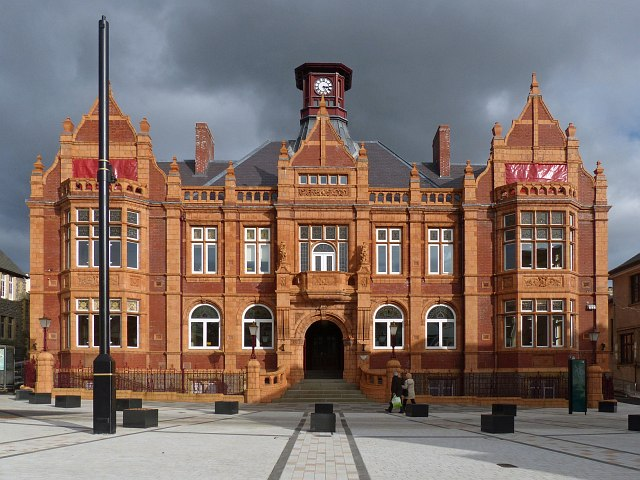
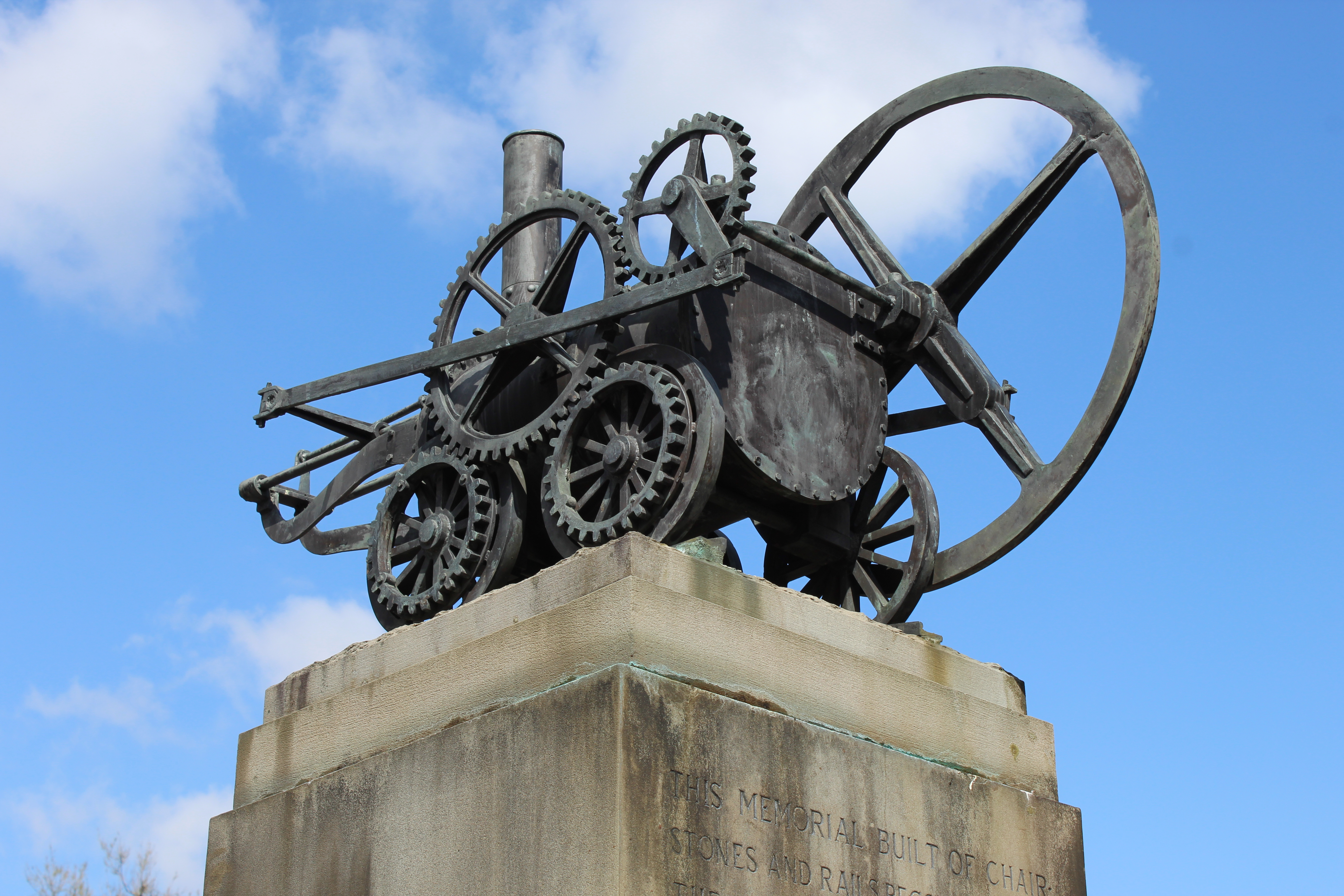
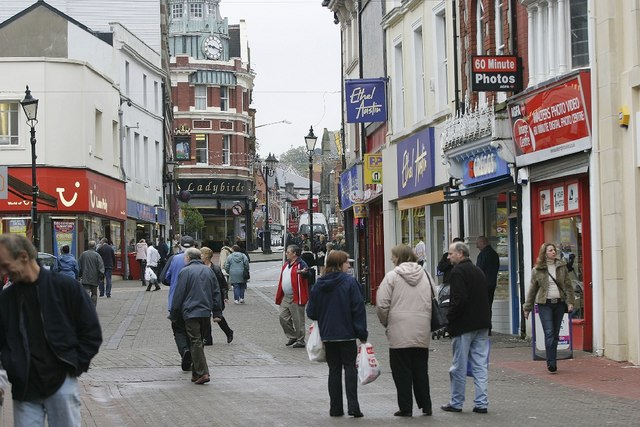
- From the top, The old Town Hall, Richard Trevithick monument, High street

- Location within Merthyr Tydfil
- Population: 43,820 (2011 Census)
- OS grid reference: SO 0506
- Principal area: Merthyr Tydfil
- Preserved county: Mid Glamorgan
- Country: Wales
- Sovereign state: United Kingdom
- Post town: Merthyr Tydfil
- Postcode district: CF47/CF48
- Dialling code: 01685
- Police: South Wales
- Fire: South Wales
- Ambulance: Welsh
- UK Parliament: Merthyr Tydfil and Aberdare
- Senedd Cymru – Welsh Parliament: Merthyr Tydfil and Rhymney

Merthyr Tydfil (Note: /ˈmɜːrθər ˈtɪdvɪl/ MUR-thər TID-vil) (Welsh: Merthyr Tudful) (Note: pronounced [ˈmɛrθɪr ˈtɪdvɪl]) is the main town in Merthyr Tydfil County Borough, Wales, administered by Merthyr Tydfil County Borough Council. It is about 23 miles (37 km) north of Cardiff. Often called just Merthyr, it is said to be named after Tydfil, daughter of King Brychan of Brycheiniog, who according to legend was slain at Merthyr by pagans about 480 CE. Merthyr generally means "martyr" in modern Welsh, but here closer to the Latin martyrium: a place of worship built over a martyr's relics. Similar place names in south Wales are Merthyr Cynog, Merthyr Dyfan and Merthyr Mawr.

Noted for its industrial past, Merthyr was known as the 'Iron Capital of the World' in the early 19th century, due to the scale of its iron production. The world's first steam-powered railway journey happened in Merthyr in 1804, travelling 9 mi (14 km) from the ironworks at Penydarren to the Glamorganshire Canal on the Merthyr Tramroad. The 1851 census found Wales to be the world's first industrialised nation, as more people were employed in industry than agriculture, with Merthyr the biggest town in Wales at that time. The city of Donetsk in Ukraine (then in the Russian Empire), originally 'Hughesovka', was founded by John Hughes of Merthyr in 1870, when he took iron working to the area. Iron production declined in Merthyr from 1860 on, though Merthyr's population continued to rise due to the emergence of coal mining in the area, peaking with around 81,000 people in 1911.

The area is currently known for its industrial heritage and adventure tourism. Merthyr and the surrounding areas boast the Grade-I listed Cyfarthfa Castle, the world’s fastest seated zip line, the UK's largest mountain bike park, the largest indoor climbing wall in Wales, national cycle routes and plans for the UK's longest indoor ski slope.

== History ==
=== Pre-history ===
Peoples migrating north from Europe had lived in the area for many thousands of years. The archaeological record starts from about 1000 BCE with the Celts. From their language, the Welsh language developed. Hillforts were built during the Iron Age and the tribe that inhabited them in the south of Wales was called the Silures, according to Tacitus, the Roman historian of the Roman invaders.

=== The Roman invasion ===
The Romans arrived in Wales by about 47–53 CE and established a network of forts, with roads to link them. They had to fight hard to consolidate their conquests, and in 74 CE they built an auxiliary fortress at Penydarren, overlooking the River Taff. It covered an area of about three hectares, and formed part of the network of roads and fortifications; remains were found underneath the Merthyr Town F.C. football ground. A road ran north–south through the area, linking the southern coast with Mid Wales and Watling Street via Brecon. Parts of this and other roads, including Sarn Helen, can be traced and walked.

The Silures resisted this invasion fiercely from their mountain strongholds, but the Roman army eventually prevailed. In time, relative peace was established, and the Penydarren fortress was abandoned by about 120 CE. This was bad for the local economy, which had come to rely upon supplying the fortress with beef and grain, and imported items such as oysters from the coast. The Romans had intermarried with local women and many auxiliary veterans had settled on farms locally.

With the decline of the Roman Empire, Roman legions were withdrawn about 380 CE. By 402, the Roman army in Britain consisted mostly of Germanic troops and local recruits; the cream of the army had been withdrawn to the continent of Europe. Sometime in that period, Irish Dalriadans (Scots) and Picts attacked and breached Hadrian's Wall. During the 4th and 5th centuries the coasts of Cambria (Wales) had been subject to the raids of Irish pirates, in much the same way as the south and east coasts of Britain had been raided by Saxon pirates from across the North Sea. Around the middle of the 5th century, Irish settlements had been established around Swansea, the Gower Peninsula, Carmarthenshire, and in Pembrokeshire and eventually petty kingdoms were established as far inland as Brecon.

=== The coming of Christianity ===
The Latin language and some Roman customs and culture became established before the withdrawal of the Roman army. The Christian religion was introduced throughout much of Wales by the Romans, but locally it may have been introduced later by monks from Ireland and France, who made their way into the region following rivers and valleys.

=== Local legends ===
Local tradition holds that, around 480 CE, a girl called Tydfil, daughter of a local chieftain named Brychan, was an early local convert to Christianity, and was murdered by either Welsh or Saxon pagans, and buried in the town. The girl was considered a martyr after her death. Merthyr translates to "martyr" in English, and tradition holds that when the town was founded, the name was chosen in her honour. A church was eventually built on the traditional site of her burial.

=== The Normans ===
For several hundred years the valley of the River Taff was heavily wooded, with a few scattered farms on the mountain slopes. Norman barons moved in after the Norman Conquest of England, but by 1093 they occupied only the lowlands; the uplands remained in the hands of the local Welsh rulers. There were conflicts between the barons and the families descended from the Welsh princes, and control of the land passed to and fro in the Welsh Marches. During this time Morlais Castle was built two miles north of the town.

=== Early modern Merthyr ===
No permanent settlement was formed until well into the Middle Ages. People continued to be self-sufficient, living by farming and later by trading. Merthyr was little more than a village. An ironworks existed in the parish in the Elizabethan period, but it did not survive beyond the early 1640s at the latest. In 1754, it was recorded that the valley was almost entirely populated by shepherds. Farm produce was traded at a number of markets and fairs, notably the Waun Fair above Dowlais.

=== The Industrial Revolution ===
==== Influence and growth of iron industry ====
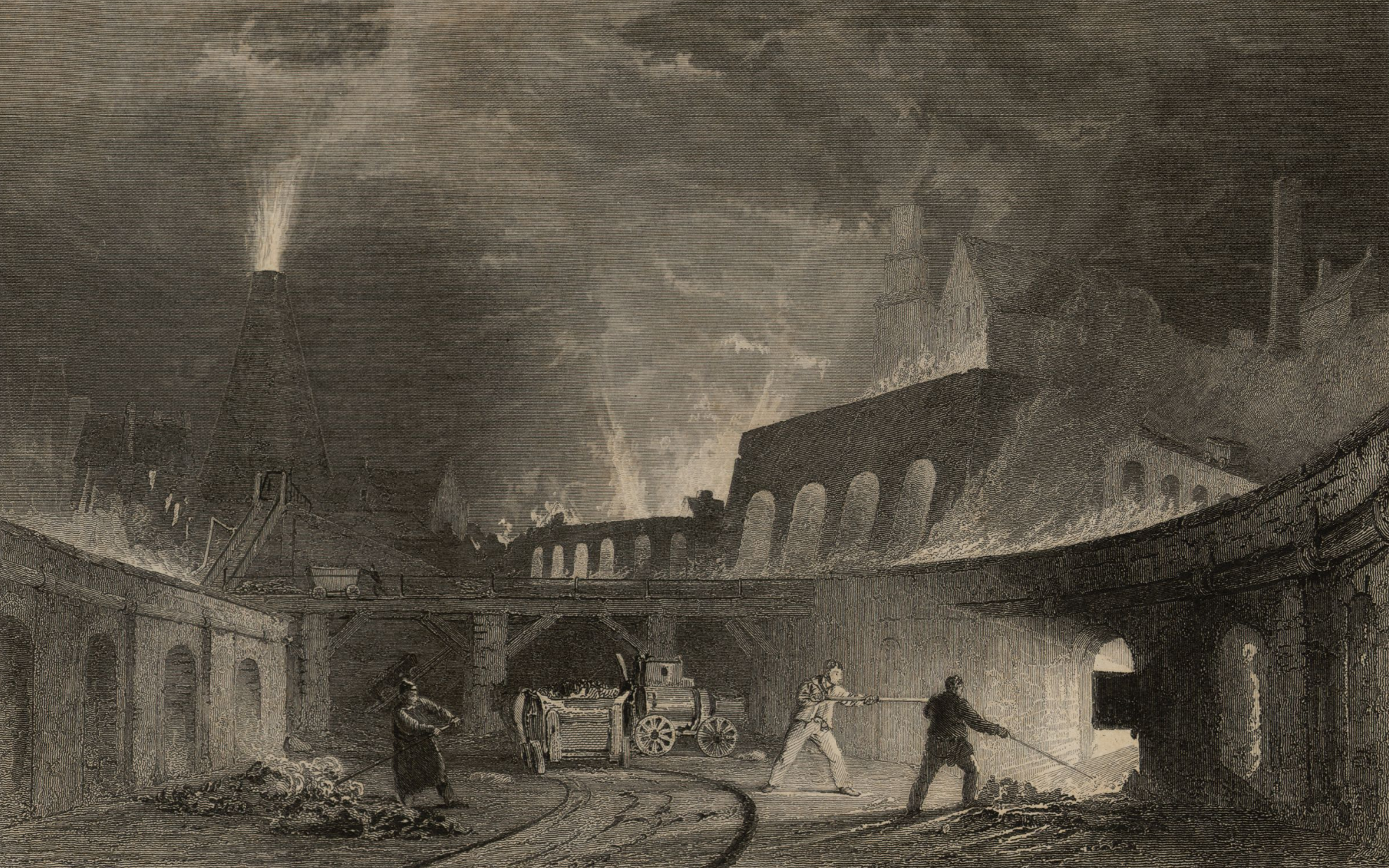
Early 19th-century industry in Merthyr Tydfil

Merthyr was close to reserves of iron ore, coal, limestone, timber and water, making it an ideal site for ironworks. Small-scale iron working and coal mining had been carried out at some places in South Wales since the Tudor period, but in the wake of the Industrial Revolution the demand for iron led to the rapid expansion of Merthyr's iron operations. By the peak of the revolution, the districts of Merthyr housed four of the greatest ironworks in the world: Dowlais Ironworks, Plymouth Ironworks, Cyfarthfa Ironworks and Penydarren. The companies were mainly owned by two dynasties, the Guest and Crawshay families.

Starting in the late 1740s, land within the Merthyr district was gradually being leased for the smelting of iron to meet the growing demand, with the expansion of smaller furnaces dotted around South Wales. By 1759, with the management of John Guest, the Dowlais Ironworks was founded. This would later become the Dowlais Iron Company and also the first major works in the area. Following the success at Dowlais, Guest took a lease from the Earl of Plymouth which he used to build the Plymouth Ironworks. However, this was less of a success until the arrival in 1763 of a "Cumberland ironmaster, Anthony Bacon, who leased an area of eight miles by five for £100 a year on which he started the Cyfarthfa Ironworks and also bought the Plymouth Works". After the death of Anthony Bacon in 1786, the ownership of the works passed to Bacon's sons, and was divided between Richard Hill, their manager and Richard Crawshay. Hill now owned the Plymouth Iron Works and Crawshay the works at Cyfarthfa. The fourth ironworks was Penydarren, built by Francis Homfray and his son Samuel Homfray in 1784.

It was the need to export goods from Cyfarthfa that led to the construction of the Glamorganshire Canal running from their works right down the valley to Cardiff Bay, stimulating other businesses along the way.

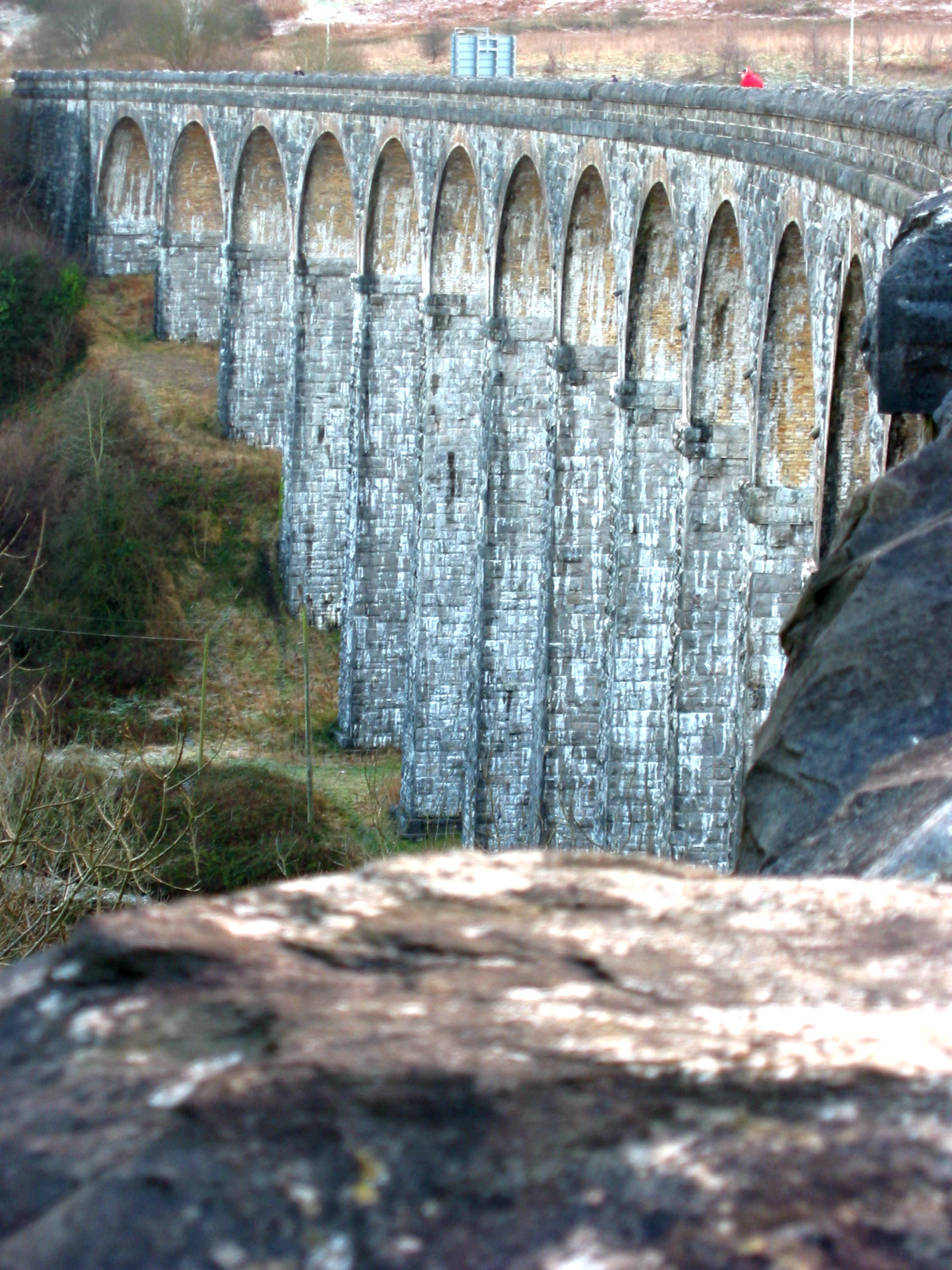
Cefn Coed Viaduct was built to carry the Brecon and Merthyr Railway.

During the first few decades of the 19th century, the ironworks at Cyfarthfa (and neighbouring Dowlais) continued to expand, and at their height were the most productive ironworks in the world: 50,000 tons of rails left just one ironworks in 1844, for the railways across Russia to Siberia. With the growing industry in Merthyr, several railway companies established routes linking the works with ports and other parts of Britain. They included the Brecon and Merthyr Railway, Vale of Neath Railway, Taff Vale Railway and Great Western Railway. They often shared routes to allow access to coal mines and ironworks through rugged country, which presented great engineering challenges. According to David Williams, in 1804, the world's first railway steam locomotive, "The Iron Horse", developed by the Cornish engineer Richard Trevithick, pulled 10 tons of iron with passengers on the new Merthyr Tramroad from Penydarren to Quakers Yard. He also claims that this was the "first 'railway' and the work of George Stephenson was merely an improvement upon it". A replica of this locomotive is in the National Waterfront Museum in Swansea. The tramway passed through what is arguably the oldest railway tunnel in the world, part of which can be seen alongside Pentrebach Road at the lower end of the town. The demand for iron was also fuelled by the Royal Navy, which needed cannon for its ships, and later by the railways. In 1802, Admiral Lord Nelson visited Merthyr to witness cannon being made.

Famously, upon visiting Merthyr in 1850, Thomas Carlyle wrote that the town was filled with such "unguided, hard-worked, fierce, and miserable-looking sons of Adam I never saw before. Ah me! It is like a vision of Hell, and will never leave me, that of these poor creatures broiling, all in sweat and dirt, amid their furnaces, pits, and rolling mills."

==== Living conditions in the China district ====
China was the name given to a nineteenth-century slum in the Pont-Storehouse area of Merthyr Tydfil. This was not a 'Chinatown' in the modern sense, and its residents were mainly English, Irish and Welsh. The inhabitants of China were seen as a separate class, away from the respectable areas of Merthyr, and were clearly recognisable by their lifestyle and appearance. In his article, In search of the Celestial Empire, historian Keith Strange compares China to areas of Liverpool, Nottingham and Derby, and states that this area was just as bad if not worse than those "little Sodoms".

There were at least 1,500 people living in the slum, the inhabitants of which were the poorest of society and had a bad reputation. Their living conditions were some of the most squalid in Britain. The slum was based around narrow streets, badly ventilated and full of crowded houses that led to festering diseases. China became known as "Little Hell" and was notorious for having no toilets but open sewers, which caused diseases such as cholera and typhoid.

==== The Merthyr Rising ====
With the Industrial Revolution came a sharp decline in young men working in agriculture, who were attracted by higher wages paid in industries such as iron. In 1829, the depression hit Merthyr hard, as ironmasters responded with dismissals, wage cuts and short-term working. Any sudden downturn in the market plunged workers into hardship, widening the class distinctions.

The Merthyr Rising of 1831 was precipitated by ruthless collection of debts, frequent wage reductions, and imposition of truck shops. Some workers were paid in specially minted coins or credit notes known as "truck", which could be spent only at shops owned by their employers. Many workers objected to the price and quality of goods sold there. Throughout May 1831, the coal miners and others who worked for William Crawshay took to the streets of Merthyr Tydfil, calling for reform, and protesting against the lowering of their wages and general unemployment.

Between 7,000 and 10,000 workers marched, and for four days magistrates and ironmasters were under siege in the Castle Hotel, with the protesters effectively controlling the town. Soldiers called in from Brecon clashed with the rioters, and several on both sides were killed. Despite the hope of negotiating with the owners, the skilled workers lost control of the movement. Several supposed leaders of the riots were arrested. One of them, Richard Lewis, popularly known as Dic Penderyn, was hanged for stabbing a soldier in the leg, becoming known as the first local working-class martyr. It was claimed in 1876 that it was not Lewis who stabbed Black, but another man, Ianto Parker, who fled to America after the incident to avoid prosecution. Such claims have never been fully verified, although Lewis's innocence is widely accepted in Merthyr.

The Chartist movement of 1831 did not consider the reforms put forward by The Reform Act of 1832 to be extensive enough.

=== The Pen-y-Darren locomotive ===
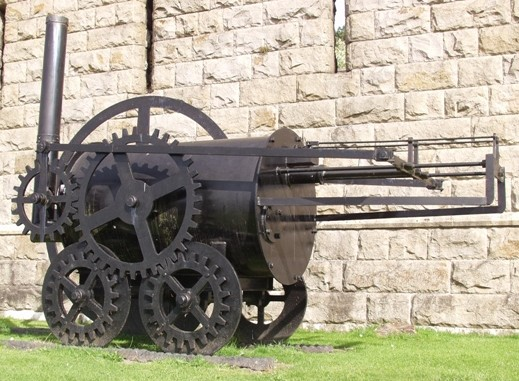
Pen-y-Darren locomotive (replica)

In 1802, Homfray, the Master of the Penydarren Ironworks, commissioned engineer Richard Trevithick to build one of his high-pressure steam engines to drive a hammer at the Penydarren Ironworks. With the assistance of works engineer Rees Jones, Trevithick mounted the engine on wheels and turned it into a locomotive. In 1803, Trevithick sold the patents for his locomotives to Homfray.

Homfray was so impressed with Trevithick's locomotive that he made another bet with Crawshay, this time for 500 guineas so that it could haul 10 tons of iron along the Merthyr Tydfil Tramroad from Penydarren (51°45′03″N 3°22′33″W) to Abercynon (51°38′44″N 3°19′27″W), a distance of 9.75 miles (15.69 km). Amid great public interest on 21 February 1804, it successfully carried 11.24 tons of coal, five wagons and 70 men over the full distance in 4 hours and 5 minutes, at an average speed of 2.4 mph (3.9 km/h). As well as Homfray, Crawshay and the passengers, other witnesses included Mr Giddy, a respected patron of Trevithick, and an "engineer from the Government". The latter was probably a safety inspector, who would have been particularly interested in the boiler's ability to withstand high steam pressures. This allowed others to develop Trevithick's ideas; some claim the modern railway system was born in Merthyr Tydfil. In modern Merthyr, behind the monument to Trevithick's locomotive, is a stone wall, the sole remainder of the former boundary wall of Penydarren House. There is a full-scale working replica of Trevithick's 1804 steam-powered railway locomotive in the National Waterfront Museum, Swansea.

=== The decline of coal and iron ===
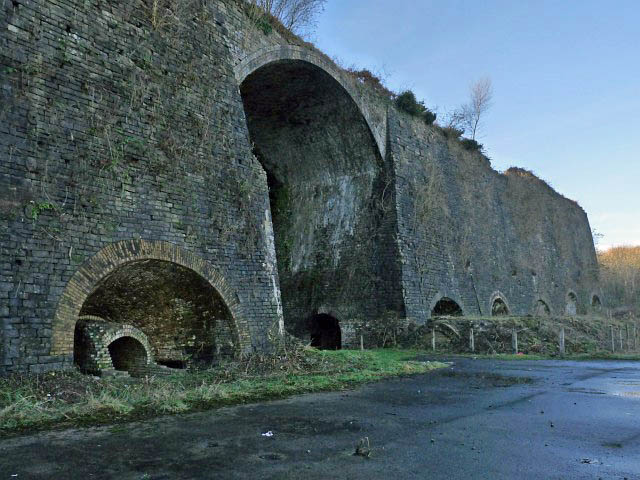
The abandoned Cyfarthfa Ironworks blast furnaces

The population of Merthyr reached 51,949 in 1861, but then went into decline for several years. As the 19th century progressed, Merthyr's inland location became increasingly disadvantageous for iron production. Penydarren closed in 1859 and Plymouth in 1880; thereafter some ironworkers migrated to the United States or even Ukraine, where Merthyr engineer John Hughes established an ironworks in 1869, creating the new city of Donetsk in the process.

In the 1870s, the advent of coal mining to the south of the town gave renewed impetus to the local economy and population growth. New mining communities developed at Merthyr Vale, Treharris and Bedlinog, and the population of Merthyr rose to a peak of 80,990 in 1911. The growth of the town led to a grant of county borough status in 1908.

A prime example of the decline is the Cyfarthfa Ironworks. The actions, or inactions, of Robert Crawshay ("The Iron King") can be seen as the main reasons for its downfall. The Crawshays refused to modernise by replacing iron production with steel production, using the newly discovered Bessemer process. This led to closure of the works in 1874, which caused economic hardship and unemployment in Merthyr.

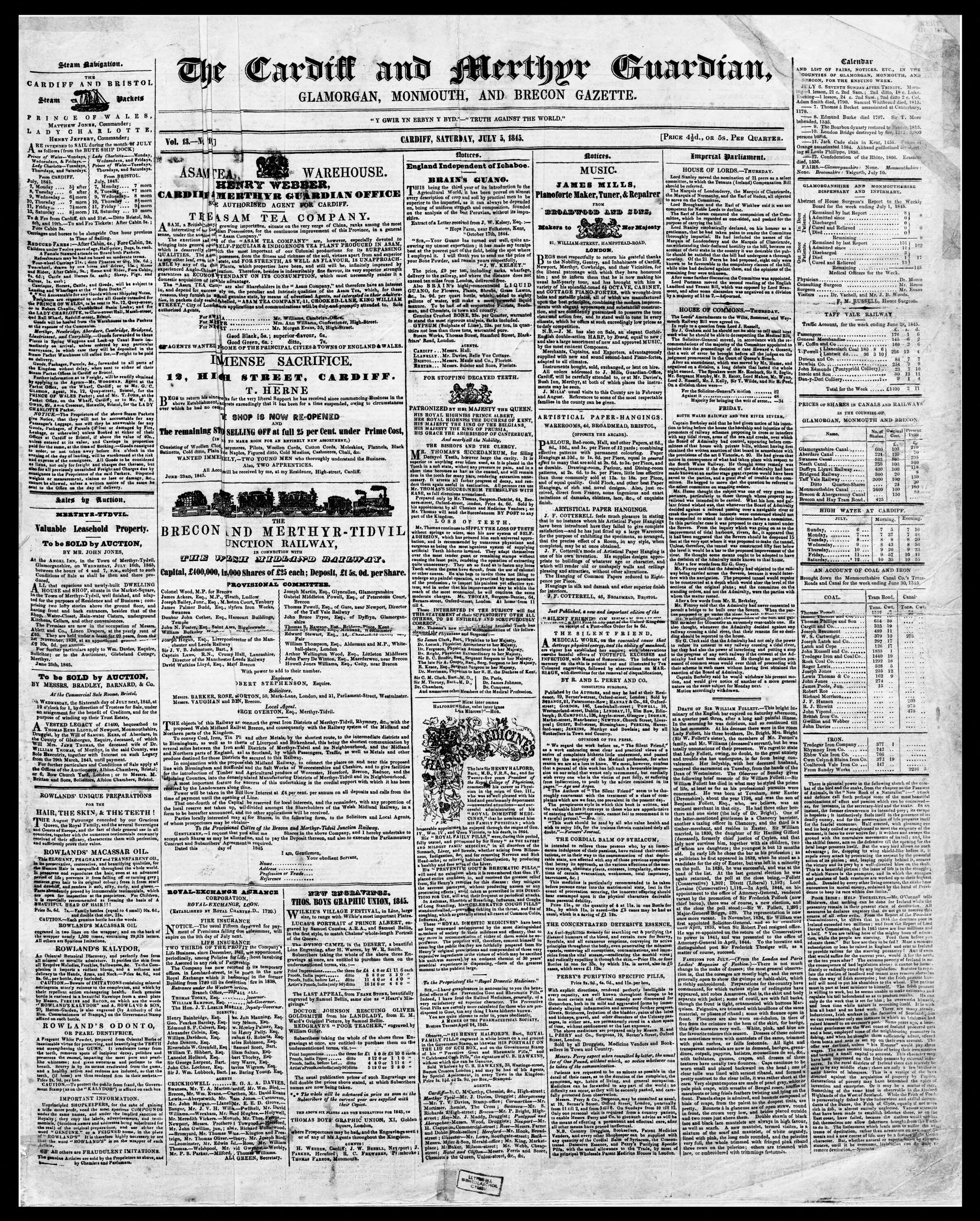
Front page of the earliest surviving copy of the Welsh newspaper The Cardiff and Merthyr Guardian; 5 July 1845

After Robert's death in 1879 his son William Thompson Crawshay took over the Cyfarthfa works. William finally modernised the works, introducing steel production. However it took until 1882 to get the works back up and running. It never fully caught up with other steel-making areas and closed again in 1910. Despite a comeback during the First World War, it finally closed in 1919. The local steel and coal industries began to decline after the war. By 1932, more than 80 per cent of men in Dowlais were unemployed; 27,000 people emigrated from Merthyr in the 1920s and 1930s, and a Royal Commission recommended that the town's county borough status be withdrawn. The fortunes of Merthyr revived temporarily during World War II, as war industry reached the area.

=== Post-Second World War ===
Immediately after the Second World War, several large companies set up in Merthyr. In October 1948, the American-owned Hoover Company opened a large washing machine factory and depot in the village of Pentrebach, a few miles south of the town. The factory was purpose-built to manufacture the Hoover electric washing machine; at one point, Hoover was the largest employer in the borough. Later the Sinclair C5 was built in the same factory.

Hoover and other companies targeted Merthyr; its declining coal and iron industries gave space for new businesses to start up there and grow. There were then increasing numbers of unemployed workers in the area and, since the Second World War, this has included women too. "Initially 350 people were employed, by the mid 1970s that number had risen to near 5,000; making Hoover the largest employer in the borough", therefore strongly filling in for the declining coal and iron industries.

The strong growth of employment of women in Merthyr after the Second World War can be seen as a result of the introduction of more light manufacturing and consumer-based business – a stark contrast to the heavy industry in the coal and ironworks which had an almost entirely male workforce.

Several other companies built factories, including the aviation components company Teddington Aircraft Controls, which opened in 1946 and closed in the early 1970s. The Merthyr Tydfil Institute for the Blind, founded in 1923, is the oldest active manufacturer in the town.

Cyfarthfa, the former home of the ironmaster William Crawshay II, an opulent mock castle, is now a museum. It houses a number of paintings of the town, a large collection of artefacts from the town's Industrial Revolution period, and a notable collection of Egyptian tomb artefacts, including several sarcophagi.

In 1992, while testing a new angina treatment in Merthyr Tydfil, researchers discovered that the new drug had erection-stimulating side effects for some of the healthy volunteers in the trial study. This discovery formed the basis for Viagra.

In 2006, inventor Howard Stapleton, based in Merthyr Tydfil, developed the technology that gave rise to the recent mosquitotone or Teen Buzz phenomenon.

In September 2021, Merthyr Tydfil County Borough Council announced a bid to apply for city status, to be coordinated by urban economic and social researcher Dr Jane Croad.

== The Welsh language ==
Use of the Welsh language in the town declined significantly in the late 19th and 20th centuries. In the 1891 census, 68.4 per cent of the 110,569 inhabitants habitually spoke Welsh. By the 1911 Census, the figure had fallen to 50.9 per cent of 74,596 inhabitants. The 2011 census showed 8.9 per cent primarily speaking Welsh.

Merthyr Tydfil hosted the National Eisteddfod in 1881 and 1901 and the national Urdd Gobaith Cymru Eisteddfod in 1987. Merthyr has 3 Welsh medium primary schools, with the third opening in 2022. There are also calls for a Welsh medium secondary school to be built in Merthyr.

== Industrial legacy ==
Founded on heavy industry, Merthyr became the ‘'Iron Capital of the World'’ and Wales' largest town the early 19th century. However, despite its long and varied industrial heritage with the decline of heavy industry and the closure of long-established nearby collieries and ironworks, Merthyr could not offer the employment it had previously. This led to marked economic challenges for the area, particularly in the 20th century.

In 2006, a Channel 4 series ranked Merthyr Tydfil as the United Kingdom's third-worst place to live. In the 2007 edition of the same series, Merthyr had improved to fifth-worst. However complaints about the show led to an investigation by regulator Ofcom, which noted the programme had been guilty of "unfortunate and avoidable" factual inaccuracies.

More recent commentary cites a growth in desirability due to various renovation projects and an increasing tourism sector. In 2021 Merthyr Tydfil local authority area had a 27.9% house price increase over the 12 months of the year, the highest of any of the 22 local authority areas in Wales. The area was second highest in Wales from 2018 to 2019.

Cyfarthfa Castle, a castellated mansion built for the Ironmasters of Cyfarthfa, is now a museum and art shop, attracting almost 7 million day visits in a year. Further plans report a 50 million renovation planned of the Castle and its surrounding areas, including rescuing the 200-year-old Cyfarthfa furnaces west of the Taff, a scheduled ancient monument of world importance, but currently endangered.

Cefn Coed viaduct is the third largest in Wales and now a Grade II listed building. It is a picturesque part of the Taff Trail cycle path linking Cardiff to Brecon.

Merthyr Tydfil Town Hall has been given a new lease of life as an arts and creative industries centre. The Grade-II listed terracotta building, opening originally in 1896 having taken 35 years to build, has had an £8 million refurbishment finishing in 2014.

The four-storey, Grade-II listed YMCA building, also with terracotta-faced structure, is undergoing an £8.6million refurbishment. Originally created by leading Welsh architect Sir Percy Thomas in 1911, it is planned to be a hub for economic and social activity.

== Open-cast mining ==
In 2006, a large open-cast coal mine to extract 10 million tonnes of coal over 15 years was authorised just east of Merthyr, as part of the Ffos-y-fran open-cast mine.

== Government ==
The parish of Merthyr Tydfil was made a local board district in 1850, which became an urban district in 1894. The urban district was made a municipal borough in 1905, with eight electoral wards. Merthyr Tydfil was granted county borough status in 1908, making it independent from Glamorgan County Council. From 1974 to 1996 the borough reverted to being a lower-tier district council, with Mid Glamorgan County Council providing county-level services in the area. The borough was also enlarged in 1974, gaining Vaynor from Brecknockshire and Bedlinog from Gelligaer Urban District.

In 1996, Mid Glamorgan County Council was abolished and the borough council took over its functions in the area, being renamed Merthyr Tydfil County Borough Council. The council governs the town and the wider Merthyr Tydfil County Borough, which stretches as far south as Treharris and Bedlinog. The town includes the electoral wards of Park, Penydarren, Cyfarthfa, Gurnos, Dowlais, Vaynor, and Town.

The Member of Parliament for the Merthyr Tydfil and Rhymney constituency is Gerald Jones; the Senedd member is Dawn Bowden MS.

== Religion ==
=== Anglican churches ===
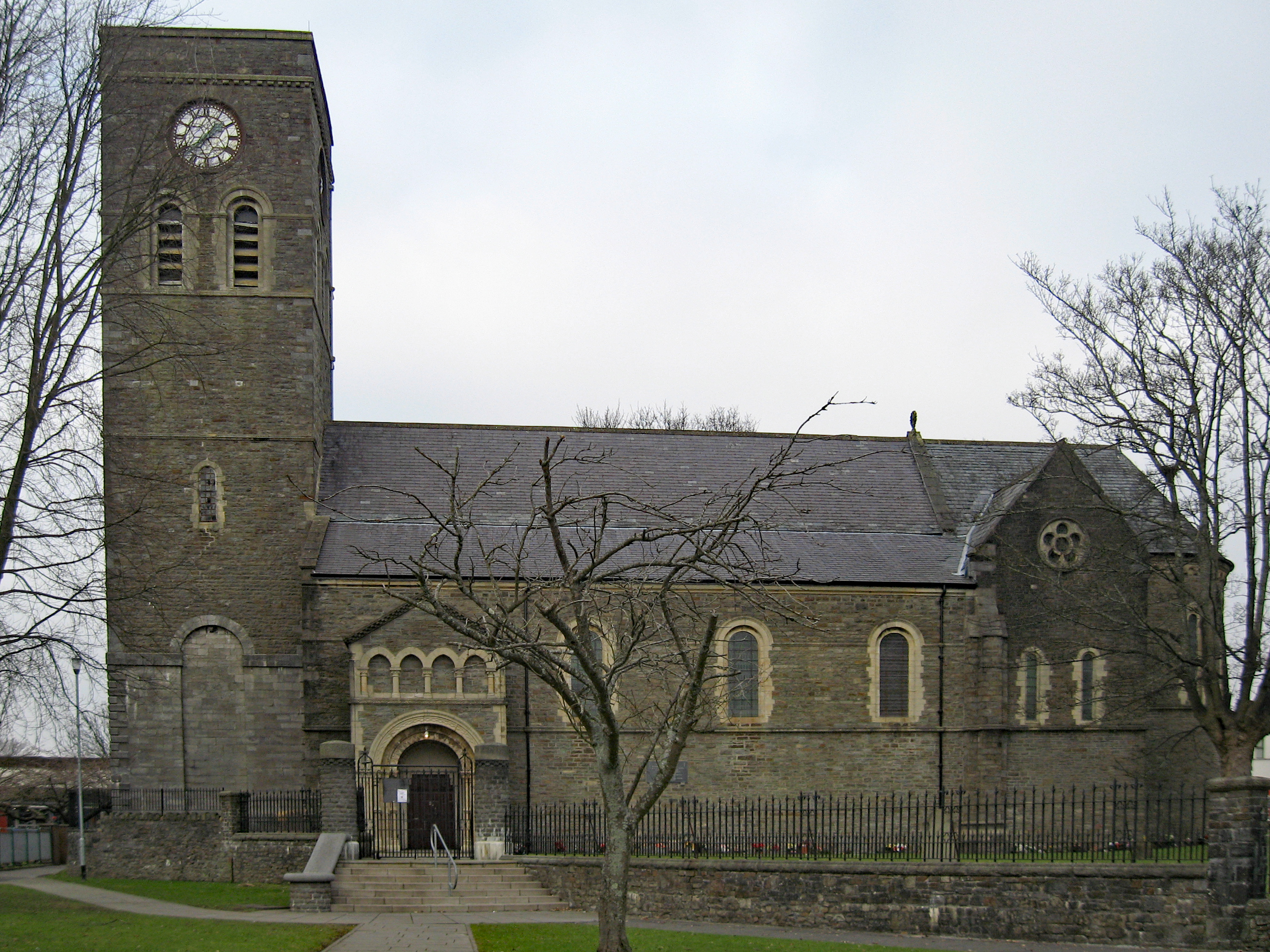
St Tydfil's Church

Merthyr was regarded as a nonconformist stronghold in the 19th century, but the chapels declined rapidly from the 1920s onwards and most are now closed.

The Church of England (now the Church in Wales) sought to counterbalance the influence of nonconformity in the 19th century and Merthyr had a succession of notable parish priests. Among them was John Griffith, rector of Merthyr from 1858 until his death in 1885. Griffith had previously been the incumbent at Aberdare, where he had created controversy for his evidence to the commissioners preparing the 1847 Education Reports. His views became more tempered over time. Griffith's move to Merthyr Tydfil saw him take over a much larger and more established parish than Aberdare. He became less than popular with the church authorities, however, as a result of his support for disestablishment. In July 1883 he stated "I have been for years convinced that nothing but Disestablishment, the separation of the Church from the State, can ever reform the Church in Wales."

Griffith's funeral was said to have been attended by 12,000–15,000 people. "I venture to declare," wrote one correspondent, "no man in this part of the kingdom could be more popular in his day and generation than the Rev. John Griffith." Among the nonconformist ministers present was an old rival, Dr Thomas Price of Aberdare.

Another influential character was Sir John Guest, who contributed greatly to the building of St John's Church, Dowlais. Despite the generally small congregations of Anglican churches, St John's thrived: it held two services in English each Sunday and also two in Welsh. This church was significant in the plan to counterbalance nonconformity in Merthyr. In 2019 the church was converted into residential flats which retain the original structure.

=== Nonconformity ===
Merthyr was notable in the 19th and early 20th centuries for a large number of nonconformist places of worship, most holding services in Welsh.

One of the earliest was Ynysgau Chapel, which dated from 1749. It was demolished in 1967 as part of the Merthyr Town Improvement Scheme. The original cause at Ynysgau was established by various "dissenters" from the Church of England. It had been acquired by the Independents (Congregationalists) by the early 19th century.

Other early chapels were Zion and Ebenezer (Baptists), Zoar and Bethesda (Independents) and Pontmorlais (Calvinistic Methodists).

=== Roman Catholic churches ===
Merthyr has four Roman Catholic churches: Saint Mary's, Saint Illtyd's, St. Aloysius' and Saint Benedict's. Roman Catholic education is provided at the Blessed Carlo Acutis Catholic School (St. Aloysius Campus).

=== The Merthyr Hebrew Congregation ===
Merthyr Tydfil had the largest Jewish community in Wales in the 19th century, reaching 400 at its height. As the Jewish population had increased, Merthyr Hebrew Congregation was founded in 1848 and a cemetery consecrated a few years later at Cefn-Coed. Merthyr Synagogue was built in 1875. Religious services ceased when it had a male Jewish congregation of under ten, the minyan (quorum) required for them.

In 1978, the building was given Grade II* listing, changed to Grade II in 1983. In the 1980s, the 120-year-old synagogue was sold and became a Christian Centre, then a gym. In 2009, permission was obtained to turn it into flats. In 2019 it was bought by the Foundation for Jewish Heritage, with plans to open as a Jewish Heritage Centre. In 2025 a planning application for this development was submitted.

== Culture ==
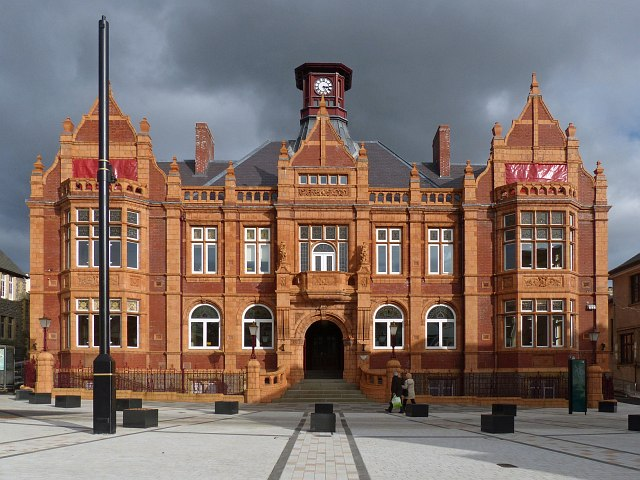
Merthyr Tydfil Town Hall after its renovation in 2014 to create the Redhouse Cymru arts centre

The town's many cultural events include local poets and writers holding poetry evenings and music festivals organised at Cyfarthfa Castle and Park. Menter Iaith Merthyr Tudful (the Merthyr Tydfil Welsh Language Initiative) has successfully transformed the Zoar Chapel and adjacent vestry building in Pontmorlais into a community arts venue, Canolfan Soar and Theatr Soar, which run a programme of performance events and activities in both Welsh and English, together with a cafe and a bookshop specialising in local interest and Welsh language books and CDs.

Merthyr Tydfil Housing Association, in partnership with Canolfan Soar, has raised funds to turn the Pontmorlais area into a cultural quarter. With references to the 1831 Merthyr Rising and red bricks for its frontage, an arts and creative industries centre named Redhouse Cymru was launched in Merthyr Tydfil Town Hall on Saint David's Day 2014. The town's several choirs – Dowlais Male Voice Choir, Ynysowen Male Voice Choir, Treharris Male Voice Choir, Merthyr Tydfil Ladies Choir, Con Voce, Cantorion Cyfarthfa, St David's Church Choir, St David's Choral Scholars, Merthyr Aloud and Tenovus – perform locally and abroad and in the media.

Merthyr has several historical and heritage groups:

- Merthyr Tydfil Heritage Regeneration Trust aims to preserve for the benefit of the residents... and the Nation at large whatever of the Historical, Architectural and Constructional Heritage may exist in and around Merthyr Tydfil in the form of buildings and artefacts of particular beauty or of Historical, Architectural or Constructional interest and also to improve, conserve and protect the environment thereto."
- Merthyr Tydfil Historical Society sets out "to advance the education of the public by promoting the study of the local history and architecture of Merthyr Tydfil".
- Merthyr Tydfil Museum and Heritage Groups aspire "to advance the education of the public by the promotion, support and improvement of the Heritage of Merthyr Tydfil and its Museums."

Merthyr's Central Library holds a prominent position in the town centre, as a Carnegie library. Merthyr hosted the National Eisteddfod in 1881 and 1901 and the national Urdd Gobaith Cymru Eisteddfod in 1987. Like nearby Aberdare, it is known for its music scene. Several bands have achieved national success, including The Blackout and Midasuno. From 2011 to 2014, the town held a Merthyr Rock Festival at Cyfarthfa Park. To complement this, the town holds the Merthyr Rising each year – a three-day celebration of town history through local music, held on the site of the Rising itself in Penderyn Square at the junction of Castle Street and High Street.

== Tourism ==
The town lies on the southern edge of the Brecon Beacons National Park and is also well-placed for visitors to the South Wales Valleys. The remains of Morlais Castle are on the northern edge of Merthyr Tydfil, the Norman castle was reportedly never completed. The Brecon Mountain Railway is a narrow-gauge tourist railway that runs up the Taf Fechan valley from Pant on the outskirts of Merthyr Tydfil, using five miles of trackbed of the abandoned Brecon & Merthyr Railway.

== Transport ==
=== Railway ===
Transport for Wales (TfW) operates a regular service on the Merthyr Line from Merthyr Tydfil to Cardiff Queen Street and Cardiff Central.

A new railway station will be built by 2024 as part of the South Wales Metro upgrades to the area. The provision of a new gateway railway station building at Merthyr Tydfil is a key strategic aspiration of the new emerging Town Centre Masterplan, providing a significant regeneration impact within the Borough, increasing connectivity and accessibility to the wider region. New overhead lines have been installed to the Merthyr tracks, powering new tram-trains. These will reduce journey times between Merthyr Tydfil and Cardiff city centre and allow TfW to increase the frequency of services to four every hour.

=== Buses ===
Merthyr Tydfil bus station is located in Swan Street, to the south of the town centre. It opened in June 2021, replacing a previous one in Castle Street. Its new location is closer to the railway station to facilitate interchange as part of the South Wales Metro network.

Stagecoach South Wales operates services in the area, with routes connecting Merthyr to Aberdare, Brecon, Bridgend, Cardiff, Newport and Porthcawl.

=== Roads ===
Road improvements mean the town is increasingly a commuter location and has shown some of the highest house-price growth in the UK.

== Employment ==
Merthyr relies on a combination of public sector, manufacturing and service sector companies to provide employment. The Welsh Government has recently opened a major office in the town near a large telecommunications call centre (T-Mobile and EE, now part of BT Group). Hoover (now part of Candy Group) has its registered office in the town and remained a major employer until it transferred production abroad in March 2009, with a loss of 337 jobs from the closure of its factory.

== Sport and leisure ==
=== Boxing ===
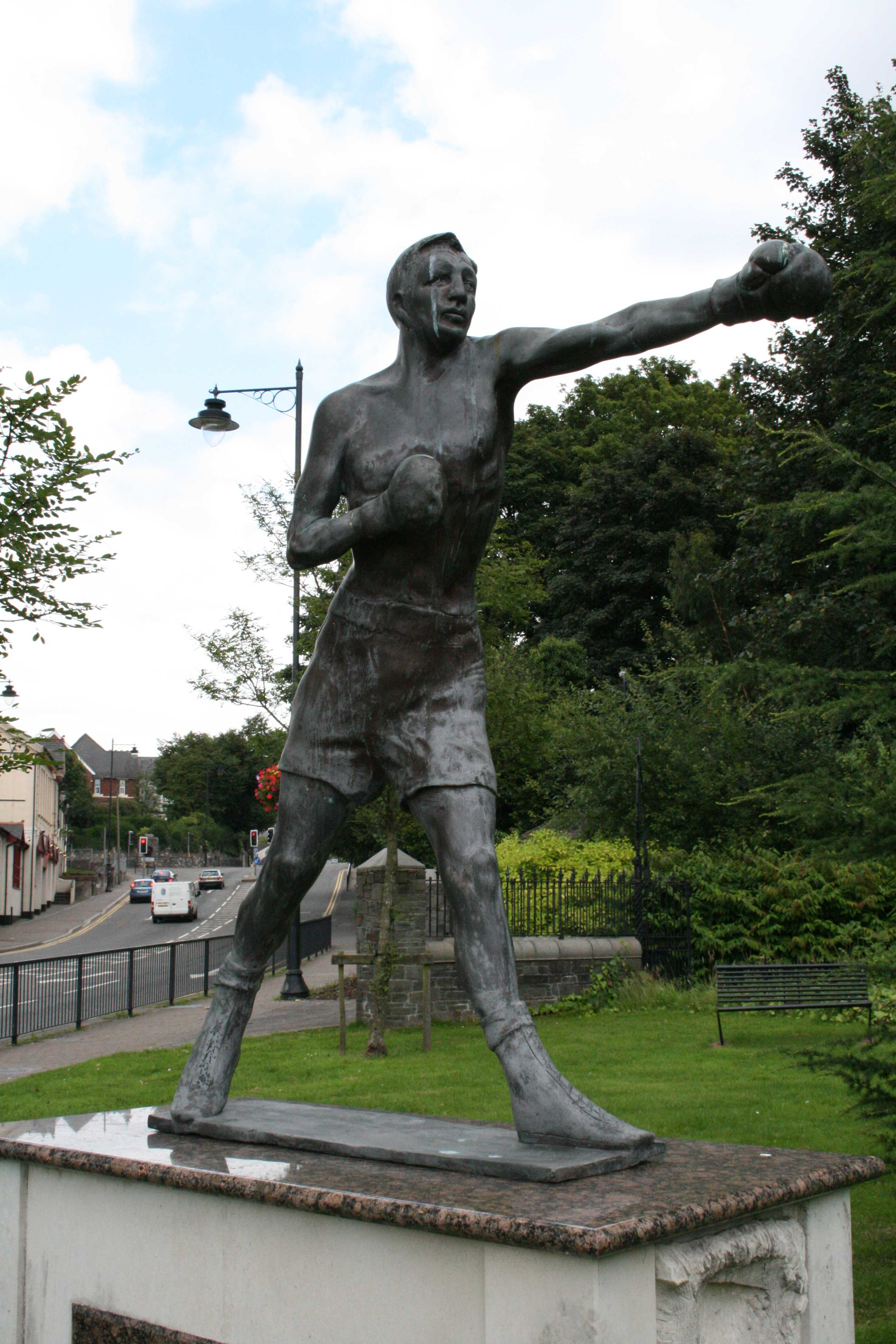
Sculpture of boxer Eddie Thomas in Bethesda Gardens

Merthyr is well known for boxers, amateur and professional. The latter have included Johnny Owen, Howard Winstone, and Eddie Thomas. A series of bronze sculptures in the town mark their achievements.

The site of the sculpture of Eddie Thomas was also the location of the Bethesda Community Arts Centre in the 1980s.

=== Football ===
Merthyr has a football team, Merthyr Town or The Martyrs, currently playing in the National League North, the Sixth tier of the English football league system. The team plays its home games at Penydarren Park.

The town was home to the professional Football League club Merthyr Town F.C. (1909), which folded in the 1930s; Merthyr Tydfil AFC was founded in 1945. In 1987, it won the Welsh Cup and qualified for the European Cup Winners' Cup. The year 2008 marked the centennial of football at Penydarren Park. After going into liquidation in 2010, the club dropped down three divisions, reverted to the name of Merthyr Town and made Rhiw Dda'r its new home ground. After promotion, the club moved back to Penydarren Park in July 2011.

=== Rugby ===
==== Union ====
Merthyr RFC, known as the Ironmen, was one of the 12 founding clubs of the Welsh Rugby Union in 1881. It competes in the Principality Premiership and plays home games at The Wern.

==== League ====
From 2017, semi-professional League 1 club South Wales Ironmen, known previously as the South Wales Scorpions, plays in the town at Merthyr RFC's ground, The Wern. Merthyr is also home to the Tydfil Wildcats Rugby League team, which played at The Cage in Troedyrhiw until September 2010. Merthyr Tydfil was one of the first rugby league sides in Wales in 1907 and beat the first touring Australian side in 1908.

=== Mountain biking ===
Bikepark Wales, the UK's first purpose-built mountain biking centre, is located at Gethin Woods, Merthyr Tydfil, spread across 1,200 acres (490 ha).

=== Outdoor pursuits ===
Parkwood Outdoors Dolygaer is an outdoor activity centre that was opened in 2015 on the site of an earlier centre run by the local education authority. Pursuits include canoeing and stand-up paddleboarding on the Pontsticill Reservoir.

== Education ==
The main secondary schools in the town are Afon Tâf High School, Cyfarthfa High School and Pen y Dre High School.

== Notable people ==
See Category:People from Merthyr Tydfil

Among those born in Merthyr are:

- Gareth Abraham – professional footballer
- Laura Ashley – fashion designer and retailer
- Des Barry – author
- Members of The Blackout – Rock band featuring Sean Smith
- William Berry, 1st Viscount Camrose – newspaper proprietor, and his brothers Seymour Berry, 1st Baron Buckland and Gomer Berry, 1st Viscount Kemsley
- Jamie Bevan – Welsh language activist
- Nathan Craze – professional ice hockey goaltender
- Kristian Dacey - Welsh international rugby player
- Gordon Davies – Welsh international footballer
- Richard Davies – actor
- Timothy Evans – wrongly convicted and hanged for murder
- Kevin Gall – professional footballer
- Sir Samuel Griffith – Australian politician; Premier of Queensland and first Chief Justice of Australia
- Gavin Gwynne – professional boxer
- Richard Harrington – actor
- John Hughes – businessman
- Ciaran Jenkins – broadcaster and journalist
- Declan John – professional footballer
- David W. Jones (1815–1879), Wisconsin politician
- Glyn Jones (1905–1995) – poet and novelist
- Jack Jones - miner and novelist
- John Edward Jones – American politician and the eighth Governor of Nevada
- William Ifor Jones – American conductor and organist
- Brian Law – Welsh international football player
- Chelsea Lewis – Welsh international netball player
- Peter Locke – Welsh professional darts player
- Julien Macdonald – fashion designer
- Man – prog-rock band
- Leslie Norris – poet and short-story writer
- Geoffrey Olsen – artist
- Dale Owen – architect
- Johnny Owen (1956–1980) – boxer
- Jonny Owen – actor, broadcaster and producer
- Joseph Parry – composer
- Gustavius Payne – artist
- Mark Pembridge – Wales international football player
- Liam Reardon - Love Island winner
- Robert Sidoli – Welsh rugby international
- Eddie Thomas – boxer
- Ian Watkins – musician and child sex offender
- Penry Williams – artist
- Howard Winstone – boxer

Other notable residents have included poet and author Mike Jenkins (his son Ciaran mentioned above) and daughter Plaid Cymru politician Bethan Jenkins; poet, journalist, and Welsh nationalist Harri Webb; National Patriotic Front and Free Wales Army organiser Gethin ap Gruffydd; General Secretary of the PCS trade union Mark Serwotka; poet, author, and Welsh language activist Meic Stephens; poet, author, and journalist Grahame Davies; and current head of Network Rail Andrew Haines. Sam Hughes began his career as a noted player of the ophicleide in the Cyfarthfa Brass Band. One of the first two Labour MPs to be elected to parliament was the Scot Keir Hardie, for Merthyr Tydfil constituency.

Notable descendants of Merthyr include the singer-songwriter Katell Keineg, whose mother is from Merthyr, the "Chariots of Fire" athlete Harold Abrahams' mother Esther Isaacs, and the grandfather of Rolf Harris. The 1970s juvenile group The Osmonds traced its ancestry to Merthyr.

Lady Charlotte Guest, publisher and translator, married ironmaster John Josiah Guest in 1833 and moved to his mansion in Dowlais, where she lived for many years. There she translated the stories of the Mabinogion in 1838–1845 and 1877.

== References in art and literature ==
- Anthony Trollope mentions it twice in the final chapter of Orley Farm as an example of a remote place where a young lawyer can be sent to.
- Horatio Clare's retelling of one of the Mabinogion tales, The Prince's Pen (Seren) refers to Merthyr as being "declared an insurgent zone", and that people would refer to "'what happened at Merthyr' for years to follow".
- Merthyr is mentioned in the folk song The Bells of Rhymney: "Is there hope for the future?" cry the brown bells of Merthyr, quoting poetry from Idris Davies.
- In the third episode of the 1978 BBC sitcom Going Straight, Merthyr is referred to as having "more pubs... than anywhere else in Britain and they're all shut Sundays."
- In Jasper Fforde's Thursday Next series (set in an alternate history), Merthyr is the capital of an independent People's Republic of Wales.
- Australian poet Les Murray references his experiences in the town in his poem, "Vindaloo in Merthyr Tydfil".
- Canadian songwriter Jane Siberry once visited Merthyr Tydfil, and used the line "and my heart is black and heavy, it is slags of Merthyr Tydfil" as an image to convey feelings of abandonment and sadness in her song "You Don't Need", from the 1984 album, No Borders Here.
- In the 2nd season of the BBC sitcom Blandings, in episode 1 "Throwing Eggs", Merthyr Tydfil is said to have a Sanitarium where the Welsh portion of the family of the Duke of Dunstable is confined.

== Twinnings ==
- Clichy, Hauts-de-Seine, France, since 1980

== See also ==
- Sustainability in Merthyr Tydfil
