= Sustainability in Merthyr Tydfil =

Public policy in a Welsh town

Local and national public authorities in the Welsh town of Merthyr Tydfil have taken considerable steps towards improving social, economic, cultural and environmental sustainability in the area. This has included funding from charities, organisations and local government. The Merthyr Tydfil council has put in place policies to regulate development on natural heritage sites, along with preserving the local history and culture. The building of homes within Merthyr Tydfil has also been influenced to create environmentally sustainable homes, with the use of renewable energy sources.

== Background ==
Merthyr Tydfil is one of the largest towns in South East Wales with a population of around 62,000 people, situated between the Brecon Beacons and Cardiff, at the centre of the Heads of the Valleys region, with one fifth of the county borough lying within the Brecon Beacons National Park. It is accessible via the A470 and A465 transport corridors, also lying close to the intersection of the A470 and A472 in the South. Only around 30 minutes North of Cardiff, Wales’ capital city. Merthyr Tydfil is rich in heritage, culture and history, once known as "iron capital of the world", as well as once contributing to Cardiff’s title as largest coal exporter in the world.

Merthyr Tydfil County Borough Council has defined sustainable development as follows: "Enhancing the economic, social and environmental wellbeing of people and communities, achieving a better quality of life for our own and future generations, in ways which promote social justice and equality of opportunity and enhance the natural and cultural environment and respect its limits - using only our fair share of the earth’s resources, preserving and sustaining our cultural legacy. Sustainable Development is the process by which we reach the goal of Sustainability".

== Economic sustainability ==
Merthyr Tydfil has implemented certain programmes in an attempt to maintain economic sustainability in the future. One such programme is the South East Wales Community Economic Development Fund (SEWCED), a European and Welsh Government initiative. This fund provided £2,000,000 to the Merthyr Tydfil CBC over a five-year period, 2010–2015, including support to local business such as Merthyr Tydfil Institute for the Blind (MTIB), an established manufacturing business which has been based in the town for 90 years, the oldest business in the area. The South East Wales Community Economic Development Fund provided £79,880 for the business in 2012, leading to an increase in overall sales of 25%, and helping the business to become a "self-sustaining manufacture business in its own right".

The SEWCED programme went on to create 30 jobs, the equivalent of 21.5 full time posts, 3 new social enterprises created, 5 organisations assisted, 28 organisations financially supported, 15 organisations adopting and implementing environmental action plans, and 13 organisations adopting and improving equality strategies and monitoring systems across the Merthyr Tydfil area, and was assessed to have been a successful programme.

== Cultural sustainability ==
It is a crucial aim of the council to sustain and preserve the town's local history and culture. Merthyr Tydfil County Borough Council are currently focusing on the Cyfarthfa heritage area, by restoring and conserving three main heritage projects which include: The Heritage Lottery Fund Parks for people scheme at Cyfarthfa Park, the restoration and enhancement of the Cyfarthfa Leat and Old Gurnos Tramway, and the re-use and restoration of Cyfarthfa Castle. These three projects aim to improve each site, drawing in more visitors and ensuring a sustainable future for all three as a cultural attraction.

Merthyr Tydfil’s natural heritage includes its biodiversity and landscapes, both of which have been impacted by human activity, throughout and since the Industrial Revolution. Sustaining these sites has become an important contribution to the quality of life experienced by the local population.

"Within Merthyr Tydfil County Borough lies two national nature conservation designations, Cwmglo/Glyndyrus SSSI and Cwm Taf Fechan Woodlands SSSI". These conservation designations welcome significant numbers of tourists, both locally and from further afield. As these sites contribute significantly in terms of culture to Merthyr Tydfil, as a part of the Local Development Plan (LDP) for Merthyr Tydfil 2006-2021, the Council have prioritised these locations as protected sites. The Council aims to protect and support the enhancement of the County Borough’s distinctive natural heritage. Development proposals will only be permitted where they maintain, enhance or do not cause harm.

== Environmental sustainability ==
One objective that is listed under the Local Development Plan (LDP) for Brecon Beacons National Park, which contains a fifth of the Merthyr Tydfil County Borough, is ‘Sustainable Use Of Land’, this objective aims to "encourage development on previously developed land in preference to the development of Greenfield land".

Merthyr Tydfil Development Plan 2006-2021 concentrates on the design of new buildings within Merthyr Tydfil and how they can be made sustainable within their environment, for example ensuring buildings are built in an orientation that would ensure they gained the full benefit of passive solar energy. As well as this, the plans include the proposed ideas of ‘wind sheltering’ which uses the building of trees and the natural environment to shelter buildings from the wind, focusing on the temperature of the buildings allowing them to sustain heat efficiently. The planting of ‘street trees’ is also proposed to enhance the quality of the local environment and its sustainability, by improving air quality, creating continuous habitats for birds and insects, and making neighbourhoods more visually attractive.

Another aspect of environmental sustainability which is being focused on within Merthyr Tydfil is the biodiversity of plants and animals within the environment. The ‘Merthyr Tydfil Biodiversity Action Plan 2014-2019’ has set targets to keep and improve the natural habitats and animals that are special to the area, including heathland, the dormouse, bats, broadleaved woodland, and rivers and streams. The Action Plan includes awareness raising, education, data collection, sustainable development and ecological connectivity for Merthyr Tydfil, its population and environment.

B&Q opened a new ‘eco-learning’ store opened in Merthyr Tydfil in 2014 and features a range of sustainable initiatives. The retail store installed a ‘Transpired Solar Collector’ system which provides renewable heat, significantly reducing the heating energy consumed and carbon footprint of the store. This has proven effective, inasmuch as the heat energy and carbon footprint of the store has significantly decreased.

== Social sustainability ==
In 2009, Merthyr Tydfil County Borough Council (Merthyr CBC) set in motion a Bridges into Work and Sustainability Plan. The goal of this plan was to reduce levels of unemployment, improve education and to find a way of reducing poor levels of health within local communities. An update report in 2012 stated "to date the plan has seen a reduction in the levels of unemployment, with 73.4 percent of people registering as economically active during 2010, compared to the economically inactive data of 52.6 percent of people when the plan was initially launched, proving this plan has been effective."

Merthyr County Borough Council announced that "Merthyr Tydfil Local Authority and Cwm Taf Health Board combined to launch the Health Social Care & Wellbeing Strategy (HSCWB) for 2011 to 2014. The strategy was initially developed to aid the improvement of health, social care and wellbeing of Merthyr’s local communities. By focussing on social determinates of health, including lifestyles and education, it was hoped that the HSCWB would reduce pre-existing health inequalities within the local community, and promised to provide an improved quality of life to its residents."

A £36 million plan launched by Ashgrove Medical Centre in 2010 directed attention to improving access to healthcare within Merthyr itself. "The £36 million investment for this plan, earmarked by the Welsh Assembly Government (WAG) was done so in order to establish Wales’ flagship health park in Merthyr Tydfil".

A further issue for Merthyr is its continuing pattern of outward migration. This process has been seen in Merthyr due to a change in economic structure, with an increased number of people moving back into cities. Out-migration leaves behind an ageing and less economically stable society, which can be seen as a key factor in Merthyr’s recent economic “crisis”. As part of Merthyr’s Local Development Plan (LDP) for 2014–2020, the Country Borough Council have acknowledged that "in order for a more sustainable future, it is essential that the LDP included the reversal of population decline at the earliest stage".

Another local strategy, the Moderate Growth Strategy, aimed to "facilitate a reduction in out migration so that population levels stabilised by 2016". This strategy has attempted to encourage people to stay within Merthyr Tydfil, particularly skilled workers.

The plans and actions undertaken by Merthyr Tydfil council link in with the aims and benefits of The Well-being of Future Generations (Wales) Act 2015. The act strengthens existing governance arrangements for improving the well-being of Wales to ensure that present needs are met without compromising the ability of future generations to meet their own needs.
