= Ambur railway station =

Railway station in Tamil Nadu, India

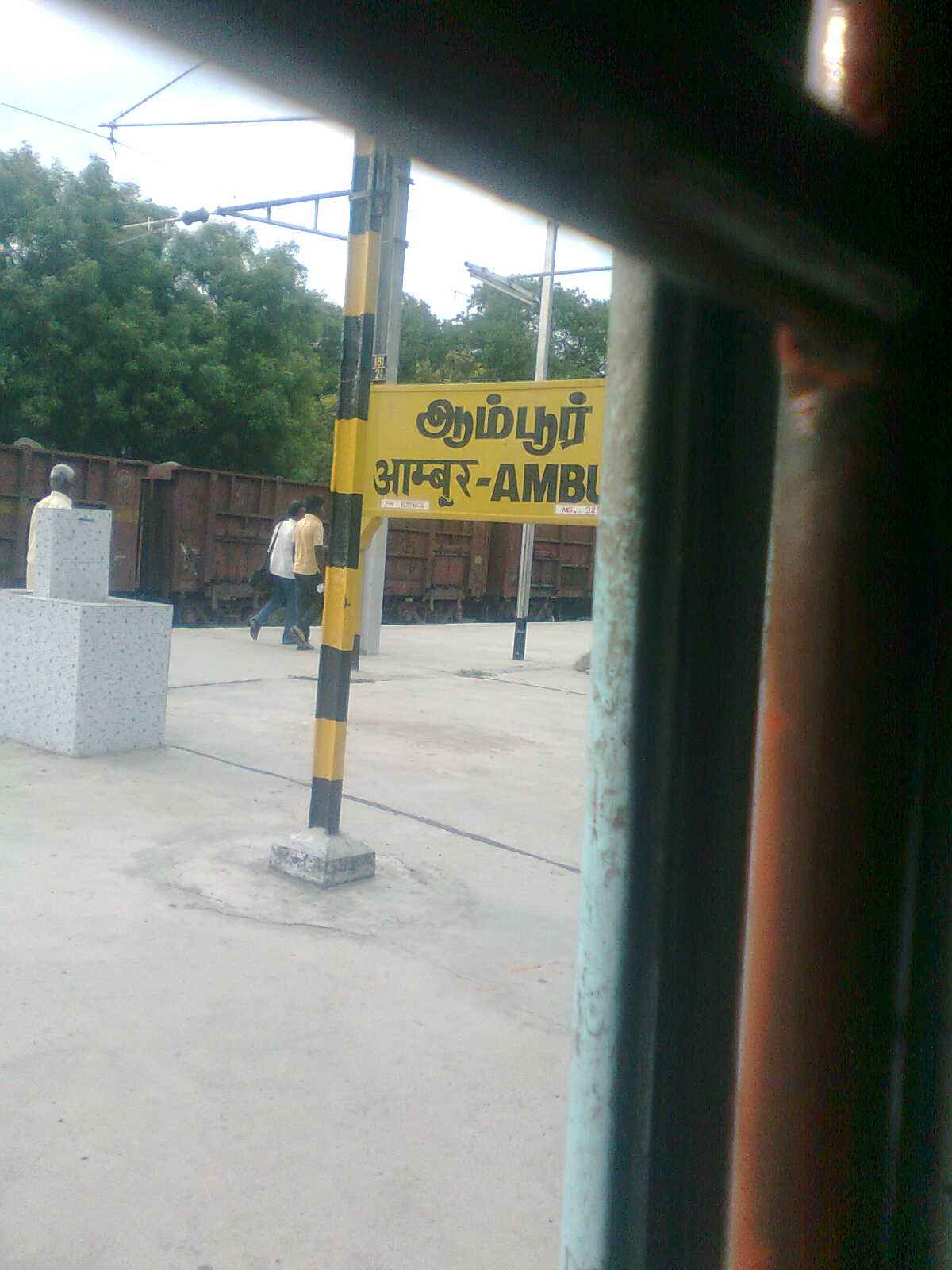

General information
- Location: Ambur, India
- Coordinates: 12.78°N 78.72°E
- Elevation: 330 m (1,080 ft)
- System: Railway Station
- Owner: Indian Railways
- Line: Chennai Central–Bangalore City line
- Platforms: 3
- Tracks: Double Electric
- Connections: Auto

Construction
- Structure type: At Grade
- Parking: Yes

Other information
- Station code: AB
- Zone(s): Southern Railway

History
- Rebuilt: 2010

Passengers
- 1500 per day
Location
- Location within India Location within Tamil Nadu

Ambur railway station (station code: AB) is an NSG–5 category Indian railway station in Chennai railway division of Southern Railway zone. It is located in Ambur, Tirupattur district, Tamil Nadu.

Ambur railway station was built in 1856 by the British raj. Royapuram to Ambur railway line started operating on July 1, 1856.

== Facilities ==
This station has a waiting hall, dormitory, retiring rooms, AC and non-AC upper class waiting room and separate waiting rooms for men and women.

== Expansion ==
Ambur railway station new building foundation was laid in the year 2008 by then Minister of State for Railways R. Velu. In the year 2010, the new railway station building along with extensions of platform 2 and 3 and also with other amenities such as waiting rooms, retiring rooms and dormitory was inaugurated.
