= St Andrew's Church, Rillington =

Church in Rillington, North Yorkshire, England

Coordinates: 54°09′28″N 0°41′45″W

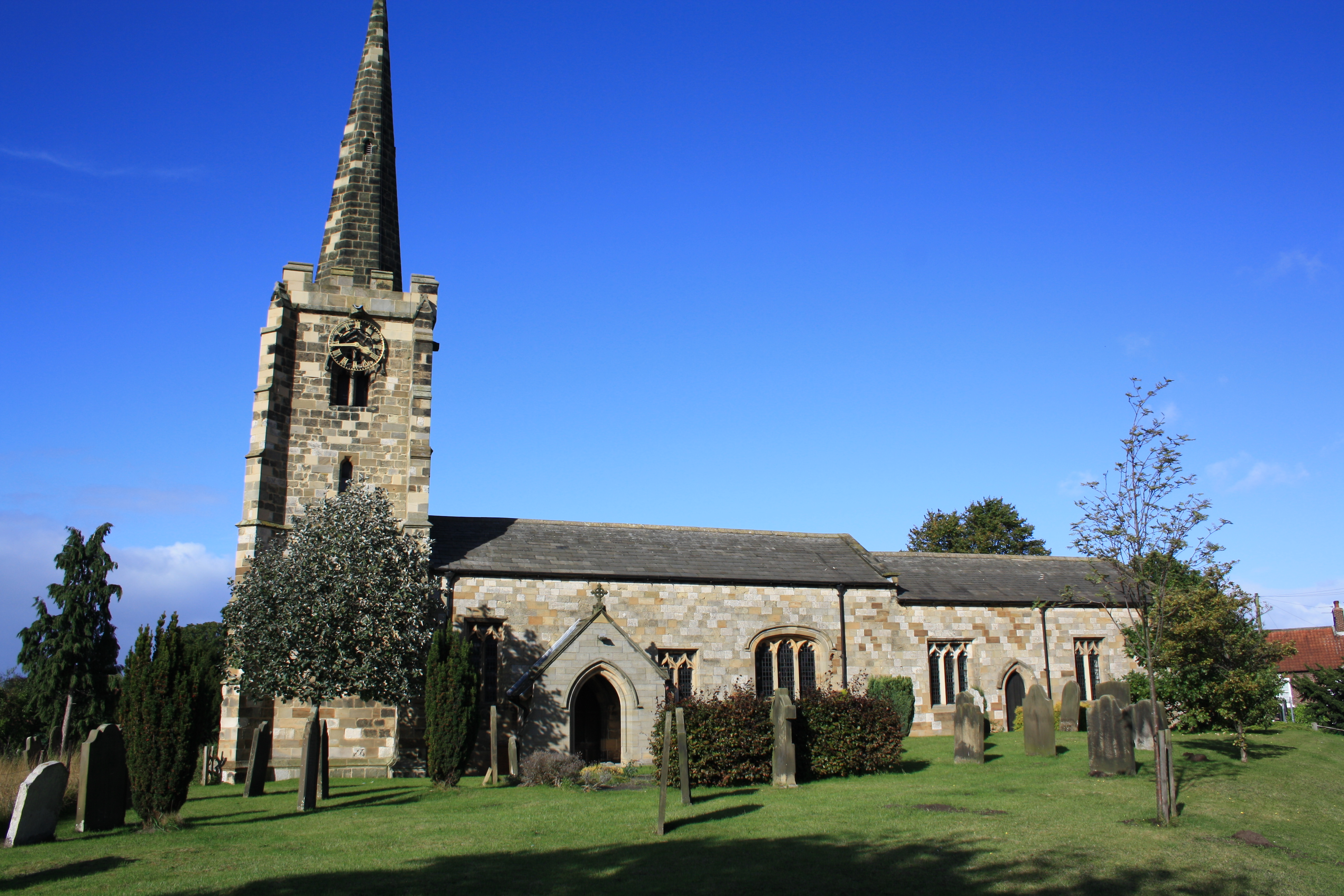
The church, in 2010

St Andrew's Church is the parish church of Rillington, a village in North Yorkshire, in England.

The church was built in the 12th century, and the chancel and arcade were added in about 1250, when Robert de Okham was appointed as the priest. The tower was added in the 15th century. The east end and south side of the church were rebuilt in 1825. Between 1884 and 1885, C. Hodgson Fowler restored the building, the work including replacing most of the windows. The south porch was added in about 1920, and the church was grade I listed in 1966.

The church is built of sandstone and Hildenley limestone, the nave roof is in Westmorland slate, and the roof of the chancel is in blue Welsh slate. The church consists of a nave, a north aisle, a south porch, a north vestry, and a west steeple. The steeple has a tower with three stages, a chamfered plinth, buttresses with offsets, a two-light west window with a trefoil head, two-light bell openings with pointed hood moulds, clock faces, an embattled parapet, and a recessed needle spire. In the vestry, there is a 13th-century wall painting, depicting the additions to the church and institution of de Okham. Other internal features include an octagonal 13th-century font and a piscina.

== See also ==
- Grade I listed buildings in North Yorkshire (district)
- Listed buildings in Rillington
