= Listed buildings in Rillington =

Rillington is a civil parish in the county of North Yorkshire, England. It contains twelve listed buildings that are recorded in the National Heritage List for England. Of these, one is listed at Grade I, the highest of the three grades, and the others are at Grade II, the lowest grade. The parish contains the village of Rillington and the surrounding countryside. The listed buildings include a church, a chapel, a country house and its stable block, smaller houses and farmhouses, and a public house.

== Key ==
Grade	Criteria
I	Buildings of exceptional interest, sometimes considered to be internationally important
II	Buildings of national importance and special interest

== Buildings ==
Name and location	Photograph	Date	Notes	Grade
St Andrew's Church; 54.15784°N 0.69581°W		12th century	The church has been altered and enlarged through the centuries, and in 1884–85 it was restored by C. Hodgson Fowler. The church is built in sandstone and Hildenley limestone, the nave roof is in Westmorland slate, and the roof of the chancel is in blue Welsh slate. The church consists of a nave, a north aisle, a south porch, a north vestry, and a west steeple. The steeple has a tower with three stages, a chamfered plinth, buttresses with offsets, a two-light west window with a trefoil head, two-light bell openings with pointed hood moulds, clock faces, an embattled parapet, and a recessed needle spire.	I
Rectory Farmhouse; 54.16099°N 0.69776°W	—	17th century	The house, which incorporates material from an earlier house, has some timber framing in the upper floor, the walls are in rendered and pebbledashed brick, and it has a pantile roof. There are two storeys and three bays, and a single-storey extension on the right. On the front is a doorway with a fanlight, and most of the windows are small-pane horizontally sliding sashes.	II
Church Farmhouse; 54.15737°N 0.69720°W		Early to mid-18th century	The farmhouse is in red brick with a stepped eaves course and a pantile roof. There are two storeys and five bays, and an outbuilding on the right. On the front is a porch, and the windows have top-opening panes, those in the ground floor with flat arches of rubbed brick.	II
Holly House; 54.15940°N 0.69623°W	—	Mid-18th century	The house is in red brick with orange brick dressings, a stepped and dentilled eaves course, and a pantile roof with coped gables and shaped kneelers. There are two storeys and three bays, with extensions on the left and at the rear. The central doorway has a fanlight, the windows are sashes, and all the openings have flat arches with painted keystones.	II
The Coach and Horses; 54.15801°N 0.69495°W		Mid-18th century	The public house, on a corner site, is in red brick with orange brick dressings, on a chamfered plinth, with stepped and dentilled eaves and a pantile roof. There are two storeys, and an L-shaped plan with a front of three bays. The central doorway has fluted pilasters, an entablature, a radial glazed fanlight and an open pediment. The windows are sashes, with louvred shutters, stone surrounds and keystones. The left return has three bays, the right bay being the projecting gable end of the front, which has applied timber framing to the upper part and contains an oriel window.	II
Park View and attached garage and outbuilding 54.16023°N 0.69815°W	—	1757	The building is in orange-red brick, with a stepped and partly dentilled eaves course, and a pantile roof. There are two storeys, a range of two bays, a lower two-storey three-bay range to the left, and further to the left is a single-storey range of outbuildings and a garage. On the front is a weatherboarded porch, and most of the windows are horizontally-sliding sashes. The date is carved in brick.	II
Park Farmhouse; 54.16162°N 0.69911°W	—	Mid to late 18th century	The farmhouse is in red brick with a stepped and dentilled eaves course, and an M-shaped tile roof. There are two storeys, a double depth plan, and a front of three bays. The doorway is in the centre and the windows are sashes, some horizontally sliding. All the openings have painted flat arches and keystones.	II
3 Westgate; 54.15772°N 0.69524°W	—	c. 1800	A vicarage, later a private house, in limestone on a deep stuccoed plinth, with a brick eaves course, and a pantile roof. There are two storeys and two bays. The doorway is in the centre, the windows are horizontally-sliding sashes, and the openings in the ground floor have wedge lintels.	II
Manor Farmhouse; 54.16616°N 0.72910°W	—	Late 18th to early 19th century	The farmhouse is in red brick, with a stepped eaves course, and a pantile roof with coped gables and shaped kneelers. There are two storeys and three bays, a single-storey extension on the left, and a rear wing. In the centre is a weatherboarded porch, and the windows are sashes. All the openings have painted wedge lintels and keystones.	II
Bethesda Chapel; 54.15813°N 0.69515°W		1818	The chapel is in limestone on a sandstone plinth, with sandstone dressings, quoins and a pantile roof. The front has two storeys and three bays, and is gabled with the date in a roundel. The ground floor contains two round-headed windows of voussoirs flanking a lunette, and on the upper floor are three round-headed windows. Along the sides are lunettes under semicircular arches, and a paired modillion eaves course.	II
Rillington Manor; 54.16375°N 0.68993°W	—	1913	A country house in red brick with a sill band, a mutule cornice, overhanging sprocketed eaves, and hipped pantile roofs. There are two storeys with attics and five bays, the outer bays on the front projecting and with quoins, and a single-storey range on the left. The centre range has a full-height round-arched arcade, a central doorway with pilaster jambs, and an open pediment with a cartouche and a motto in the tympanum. The windows are sashes under varying arches, and there are dormers in the attics with volutes between the sashes. The garden front has full-height canted bay windows in the outer bays, and a single-storey glazed loggia with Doric columns.	II
Stable block, Rillington Manor; 54.16373°N 0.69047°W	—	1913	The stable block is in red brick, with rusticated quoins, an impost band, bracketed eaves and a hipped pantile roof. There is a single storey, and a flat arch in the centre flanked by three-bay blind arcades, each bay containing a lunette. Above, are two flat dormers, the one on the left between volutes.	II
