= Bethesda, Pembrokeshire =

Village in Pembrokeshire, Wales

Coordinates: 51.828°N 04.770°W

Bethesda
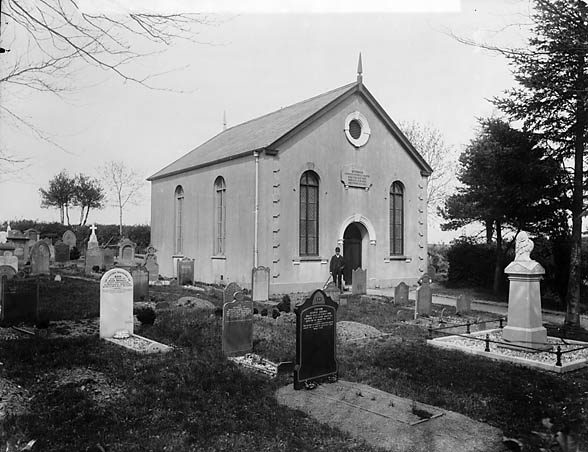
- Bethesda Chapel, circa 1885

- Location within Pembrokeshire
- OS grid reference: SN0918
- Principal area: Pembrokeshire
- Country: Wales
- Sovereign state: United Kingdom
- Police: Dyfed-Powys
- Fire: Mid and West Wales
- Ambulance: Welsh

Bethesda (/bɛˈθɛzdə/; Welsh: [bɛθ'ɛsda]) is a small village in the community of Llawhaden, Pembrokeshire, Wales. It lies on a bend of the B4313 road in the valley of the Eastern Cleddau river a few miles north north west of Narberth.

== History ==
The village is marked on pre-1850 maps as situated in the parish of Llawhaden.

== Chapel ==
To the west of the village is a Welsh Independent (Congregational) chapel, first built in 1797, rebuilt in 1848 and a graveyard added in 1849. It was restored in 1871 and is a Grade II listed building. A history of the chapel and details of the lives of the incumbents was published in 1871 when the congregation numbered 150. The chapel was still active in 2006.

== Penllwyn ==
A short distance further west is the large, Georgian country house named Penllwyn (or Pen-llwyn), also a Grade II listed building. It was built in the late 18th century on to a 17th-century farmhouse belonging to Dafydd Morris, a local Congregational minister. The farmhouse became the service wing of the main building.

== Vaynor ==
To the southeast of the village, Vaynor is an estate with origins at least as early as the beginning of the 17th century, as the farmhouse carries the date 1707 and the initials WS. It was at one time the home of the Skyrme family and is a Grade II* listed building. Comprehensive archive records and photographs are noted by Coflein.

Further to the south is an earthwork, probably Iron Age, a scheduled monument. In 1960, evidence of occupation was turned up while ploughing.
