= Bethesda, Iowa =

- Unincorporated community
- Location within Iowa
- Coordinates: 40°50′35″N 95°05′59″W
- Country: United States
- State: Iowa
- County: Page
- Elevation: 1,217 ft (371 m)
- Time zone: UTC-6 (Central (CST))
  - Summer (DST): UTC-5 (CDT)
- Area code: 712
- GNIS feature ID: 454581

Bethesda is an unincorporated community in Douglas Township, Page County, Iowa, United States. Bethesda is located along county highways M63 and J20, 7.7 miles (12.4 km) north-northwest of Clarinda.

== History ==
Bethesda's population was 54 in 1902, and 25 in 1925. The population was 20 in 1940.
