= Bethesda, Greene County, Georgia =

Unincorporated community in Georgia, U.S.

Coordinates: 33°38′03″N 83°00′35″W

Bethesda is an unincorporated community in Greene County, in the U.S. state of Georgia.

== History ==
Bethesda is a name derived from Hebrew meaning "house of mercy".
