= Bethesda Chapel, Merthyr Tydfil =

Former chapel in Merthyr Tydfil, Wales

Coordinates: 51.7487°N 3.3809°W

Bethesda, Merthyr Tydfil
- Bethesda, Merthyr Tydfil
- Location: Bethesda Street, Merthyr Tydfil
- Country: Wales
- Denomination: Independent (Congregationalist)

History
- Founded: 1807

Architecture
- Architectural type: Chapel
- Style: mid 19th century
- Completed: 1881
- Closed: 1976
- Demolished: 1995

Bethesda, Merthyr Tydfil was one of the earliest chapels in the Welsh industrial town of Merthyr Tydfil. Services were held in the Welsh language.

== Early history ==
Like several other Welsh chapels, Bethesda originated in a split in the congregation at Zoar Chapel nearby. In 1807, Daniel Lewis, the minister at Zoar, visited London and other places to raise funds to clear the chapel's debts. Some members of the congregation objected, and when an independent investigation found in favour of the minister, a number left to establish a new church.

Initial meetings were held in rooms and premises at various places in the town, but in 1811 it was decided to build a chapel under the guidance of Methusalem Jones, who had become the minister. During Jones's ministry, there was considerable expansion in membership and a new chapel was built in 1829. Bethesda was also the mother church of a number of chapels in the locality including Bethania, Dowlais.

== Later history ==
During the 1850s, the composer Joseph Parry was a member at Bethesda. During the ministry of Rhys Gwesyn Jones between 1858 and 1867 the membership reduced owing to the closure of Penydarren Ironworks.

In the late 1870s it was decided to build a larger and more comfortable chapel, and the foundation stone was laid by Mrs W T Crawshay (wife of William Crawshay, the owner of Cyfarthfa Ironworks) in 1880. John Williams of Merthyr was the architect and the chapel was built by John Francis Davies of Dowlais. It was completed in 1881 at a cost of £1,200.

The chapel closed in 1976 due to a diminishing congregation. The building was used as an arts centre for several years, but it fell into disrepair and was demolished in 1995.

== Sources ==
- Rees, Thomas; Thomas, John (1871). Hanes Eglwysi Annibynnol Cymru, Vol. 2.
