= Bethesda Baptist Church and Cemetery =

Historic site in Greene County, Georgia, US

- U.S. National Register of Historic Places
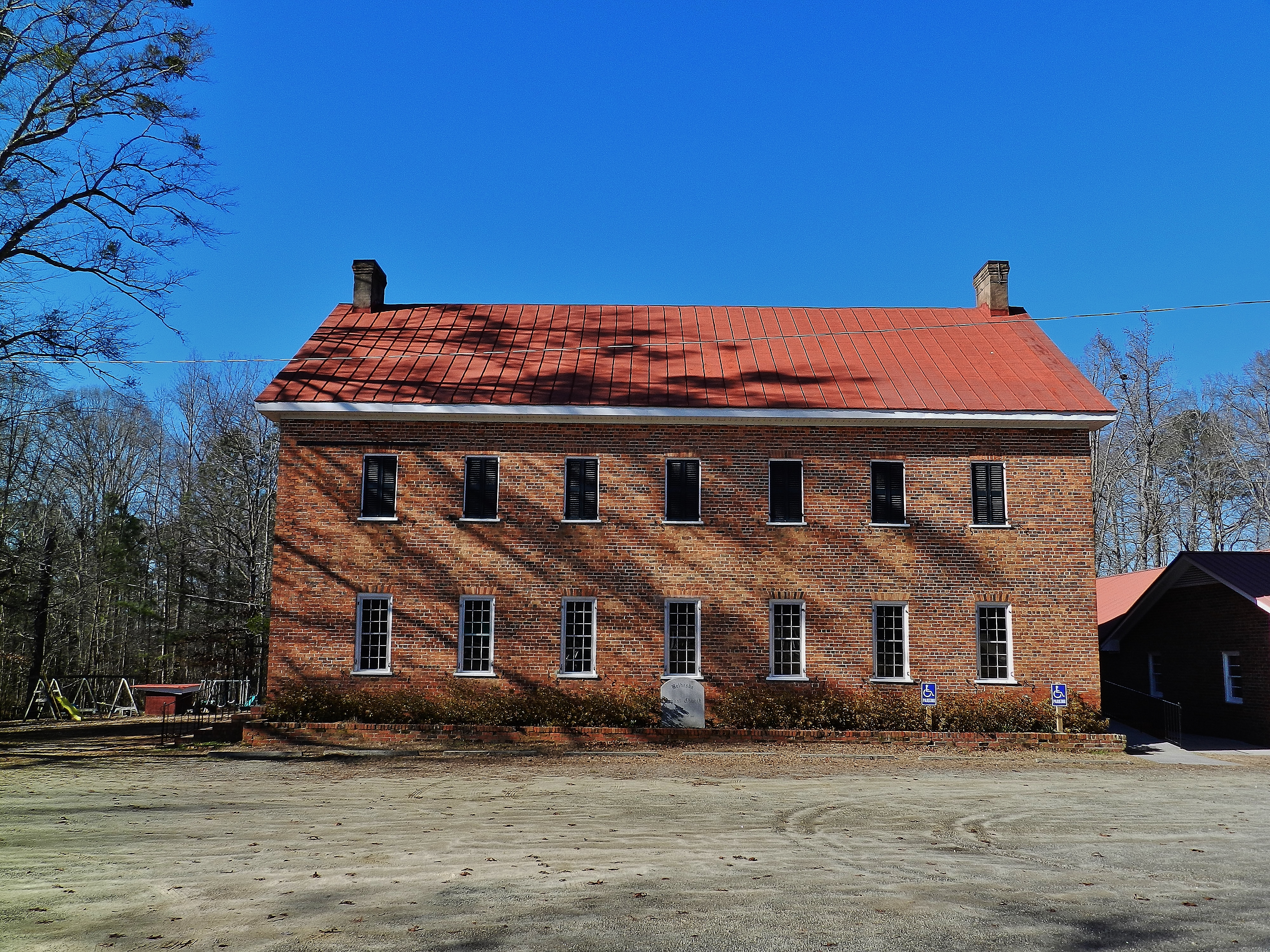

- Location within Georgia
- Nearest city: Union Point, Georgia
- Coordinates: 33°39′07″N 83°00′36″W
- Area: 10.8 acres (4.4 ha)
- Built: c.1818
- Architectural style: Federal
- NRHP reference No.: 98000967
- Added to NRHP: August 6, 1998

The Bethesda Baptist Church and Cemetery in Greene County, Georgia near Union Point, Georgia was built in 1818. It was listed on the National Register of Historic Places in 1998. The listing included two contributing buildings, two contributing structures, and two contributing sites.

The complex is located at the junction of County Rd. 120 and County Rd. 129. It includes a two-story brick church from c.1818 built in vernacular Federal style, with brick laid in American bond. Its first floor walls are 18 inches (0.46 m) thick. It has interior end brick chimneys.
