= Bethesda Academy =

- U.S. National Register of Historic Places
- U.S. Historic district
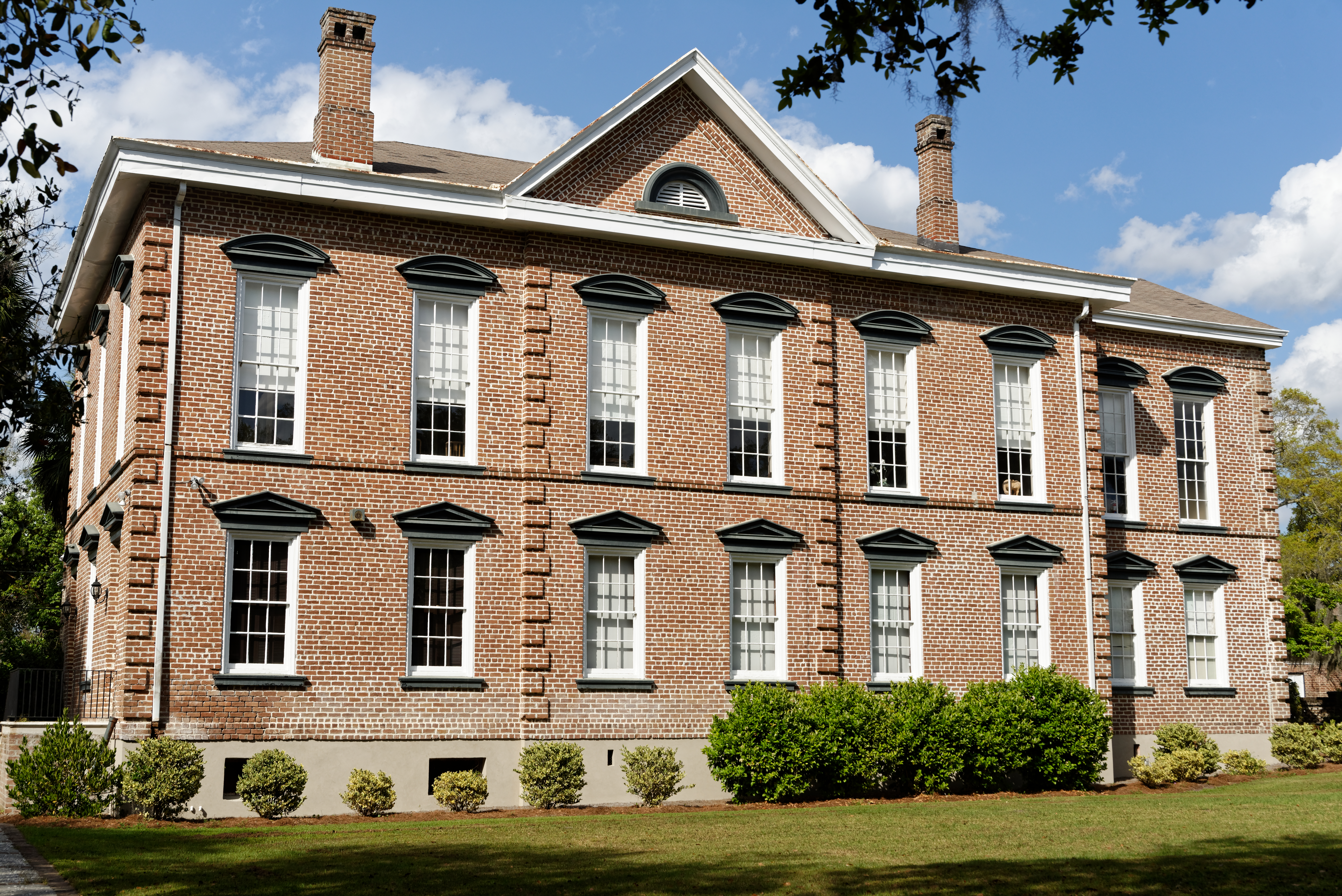

- Location within Georgia Location within the United States
- Nearest city: Savannah, Georgia
- Coordinates: 31°57′34″N 81°5′43″W
- Area: 650 acres (260 ha)
- Built: 1870
- Architectural style: Classical Revival
- Website: Bethesda Academy
- NRHP reference No.: 73000614
- Added to NRHP: September 12, 1973

Bethesda Academy (previously known as Bethesda Home for Boys) is a boys' school and former orphanage located in unincorporated Chatham County, Georgia, in the United States, near Savannah. It is the oldest organized charity in the United States. Its historic building was listed on the National Register of Historic Places in 1973.

== History ==
It was founded in 1740 as an orphanage by evangelist George Whitefield, in the 18th century on his 500 acre (1,600 m^{2}) land grant about 10 miles (16 km) south of Savannah, in the newly founded colony of Georgia. Upon its foundation, the state's first highway was built between Savannah and the orphanage. Whitefield, who was advised to build the orphanage by Reverend John Wesley, called the property Bethesda, which means "House of Mercy," for he hoped many acts of mercy would take place there. On March 25, 1740, construction began on the orphanage buildings. The main house was two stories high with twenty rooms. Two smaller buildings were built behind the orphanage; one was designed to be an infirmary and the other a workhouse.

Whitefield wanted the orphanage to be a place of strong Calvinist influence with a wholesome atmosphere and strong discipline. Boys were taught trades so that they could earn a living as adults. Younger children learned spinning and carding, and all boys were taught mechanics and agriculture. Whitefield hoped that the orphanage would become the foundation of a university.

While the children grew most of the orphanage food, the enterprise was more expensive than anticipated, and Whitefield went into debt. Benjamin Franklin suggested that due to the scarcity of workmen and materials in Georgia, it might be better to move the orphanage and its children to Philadelphia. Whitefield refused to move the orphanage because his contributors donated money specifically for the Georgia project.

At his death, Whitefield bequeathed the orphanage and his slaves to the Selina Hastings, Countess of Huntingdon, a charitable sponsor in England. He asked her to maintain the orphanage under its existing principles, and establish a college. However, she was not able to provide the oversight from 3,000 miles (4,800 km) away, and the orphanage almost closed.

In 1773, fire destroyed the home. Three years later, the American Revolution stymied plans to add a college. After several administrative changes, a new building and society, the Bethesda Home for Boys was established on the same site.

== Bethesda and slavery ==
In the early 18th century, slavery had been outlawed in Georgia. In 1749, Whitefield campaigned for its legalization, arguing that the territory would never be prosperous unless farms were able to use slave labor. He began his fourth visit to America in 1751 advocating slavery, viewing its re-legalization in Georgia as necessary to make his plantation profitable. Partially through his campaigns and written pleas to the Georgia Trustees, it was re-legalized in 1751. Whitefield then purchased slaves to work at Bethesda Orphanage. To help raise money for the orphanage, he also employed slaves at his Providence Plantation. When Whitefield died, he bequeathed his slaves to the Countess of Huntingdon.

== Modern times ==
Bethesda has not been an orphanage for many years, but continues to focus on youth in the greater Savannah area. Bethesda is a private boarding and day school for boys in grades 6-12 and, in April 2011, the Bethesda Home for Boys was renamed Bethesda Academy to better reflect their mission and commitment to the education of young men. In 2015, Bethesda kicked off its 275th Anniversary year.

== Sources ==
- Demaray, Donald E. Pulpit Giants; what made them great. (Chicago: Moody Press, 1973).
- Macartney, Clarence Edward Noble. Six Kings of the American pulpit. (Philadelphia, The Westminster Press, 1942).
- McGraw, James. Great Evangelical Preachers of Yesterday. (Nashville: Abingdon Press, 1961).
- Whitefield, George. George Whitefield's Journals. (Banner of Truth Trust, 1960).
- Robert V. Williams, “George Whitefield’s Bethesda: the Orphanage, the College, and the Library” (Library History Seminar #3, Proceeding 1968)
