= Ambur =

- Town
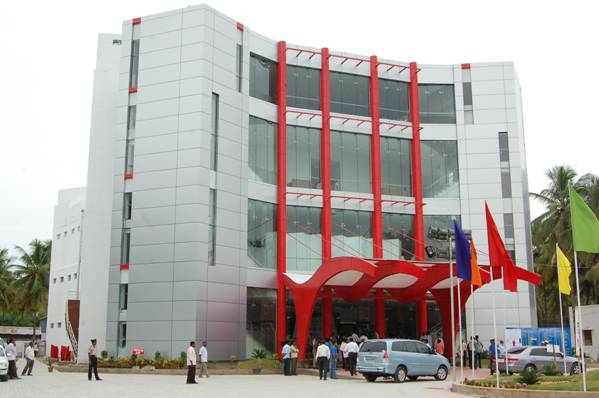
- Ambur Trade Centre

- Ambur, Tamil Nadu
- Coordinates: 12.780°N 78.718°E
- Country: India
- State: Tamil Nadu
- Region: Tondai Nadu
- Division: Vellore
- Legislative Assembly Constituency: Ambur
- Lok Sabha Constituency: Vellore
- Administrative District: Tirupathur

Government
  - Type: Municipality
  - Body: Ambur Municipality

Area
  - Total: 17.97 km^{2} (6.94 sq mi)
- Elevation: 346 m (1,135 ft)

Population (2011)
  - Total: 114,608
  - Density: 6,378/km^{2} (16,520/sq mi)

Languages
  - Official: Tamil

Languages
- Time zone: UTC+5:30 (IST)
- PIN: 635802
- Telephone code: 91–4174
- Vehicle registration: TN 83, TN 23
- Sex ratio: 1031 ♂/♀

Ambur is a major town in the Vellore division in the South Indian state of Tamil Nadu. It is recognised as one of India's major leather manufacturing and export hubs. Along with its twin town, Vaniyambadi (16 km to the West), Ambur is a part of the Vaniyambadi Revenue district, which accounts for a significant share of India's finished leather, leather garments, and footwear components shipped directly to international markets, including Europe and North America.

Historically, Ambur has remained a major town in the North Arcot district of the Madras Presidency (present-day Tamil Nadu). In 1989, the North Arcot district was bifurcated into Vellore and Tiruvannamalai districts, and Ambur remained part of the Vaniyambadi Taluk in the Vellore district. In 2009, Ambur taluk was formed by splitting major land areas from the neighbouring Vaniyambadi taluk and few parts from the Vellore taluk. Later in 2019, the Vellore district was further trifurcated into Ranipet, Tirupathur, and Vellore districts, with Ambur becoming part of Tirupathur district.

Ambur is located on the banks of the Palar River between Chennai and Bangalore. Ambur has a sizeable leather industry, and is known for its spicy biryani and for the sweet, makkhenpeda. Ambur was the site of two major military actions in the 18th century. The first was the 1749 Battle of Ambur that opened the Second Carnatic War between the Arcot State and the Mughal Empire. In 1767, the siege of Ambur took place during the First Anglo-Mysore War, with local troops and a British force successfully resisting an attack by the Kingdom of Mysore and by the Hyderabad State.

== Administration ==
Ambur is a selection grade municipality and headquarters of Ambur taluk which is an administrative division comprising 79 Revenue villages. The municipal council has 36 elected members. It elects a member for representing the Ambur assembly constituency.

== Demographics ==
Religion in Ambur (2011)
Religion	Percent(%)
Muslim	50.10%
Hindu	45.80%
Christian	3.83%
Others	0.27%

Languages of Ambur City (2011)
1. Urdu (48.3%)
2. Tamil (44.4%)
3. Telugu (6.18%)
4. Kannada (0.36%)
5. Others (0.83%)

According to 2011 census, Ambur had a population of 114,608 with a sex-ratio of 1,033 females for every 1,000 males, much above the national average of 929. A total of 13,235 were under the age of six, constituting 6,716 males and 6,519 females. Scheduled Castes and Scheduled Tribes accounted for 16.83% and 0.57% of the population respectively. The average literacy of the city was 76.08%, compared to the national average of 72.99%. The city had a total of 25,009 households. There were a total of 40,654 workers, comprising 163 cultivators, 519 main agricultural labourers, 982 in house hold industries, 35,411 other workers, 3,579 marginal workers, 27 marginal cultivators, 174 marginal agricultural labourers, 306 marginal workers in household industries and 3,072 other marginal workers.

As per the religious census of 2011, Muslims formed the majority in Ambur with 50.1% of the population adhering to it, followed by 45.8% were Hindus, and 3.8% Christians.

Urdu is the most spoken language with 48.3% of the population speaking the language. Tamil is spoken by 44.4% of the population, and Telugu by about 6.18% of the population.

== Geography ==
Ambur is geographically located at 12.780200°N 78.717700°E with an average elevation of 346 metres (1,135 ft). It lies roughly halfway between Chennai (190 km away) and Bengaluru (161 km away). Ambur has a tropical wet-and-dry climate, reaching high temperatures during summer and experiences wet winters. The maximum rainfall occurs during October and November, with the northeast monsoon. The area also experiences light rainfall during the southwest monsoon. The temperature falls up to 12°C low in winter. It experience a hot summer where the temperature rises up to 39°C.

== Economy ==
The economy is dependent on the leather industry. The town houses leather tanning and manufacturing facilities and is a leading cluster for export of finished leather and leather-related products. In the beginning, the development of tanning in Ambur was due to military demand for tanned leather primarily for boot production during and before World War I. Nearly 80 tanneries are located in Ambur.

== Cuisine ==
Rice is the staple food of the people in this region. Ambur is known for its spicy biryani.

== Transport ==
Ambur has a regular railway station (code name: AB) with double electric-line track. 24 trains stop at this station. Ambur bus stand was constructed in 1988. Ambur is located in between Bangalore (160 km [99 mi]), and Chennai (185 km [115 mi]), and connected well with frequent bus and train services.
