= Bethesda Meeting House =

Historic church in Maryland, United States

- Bethesda Meetinghouse
- U.S. National Register of Historic Places
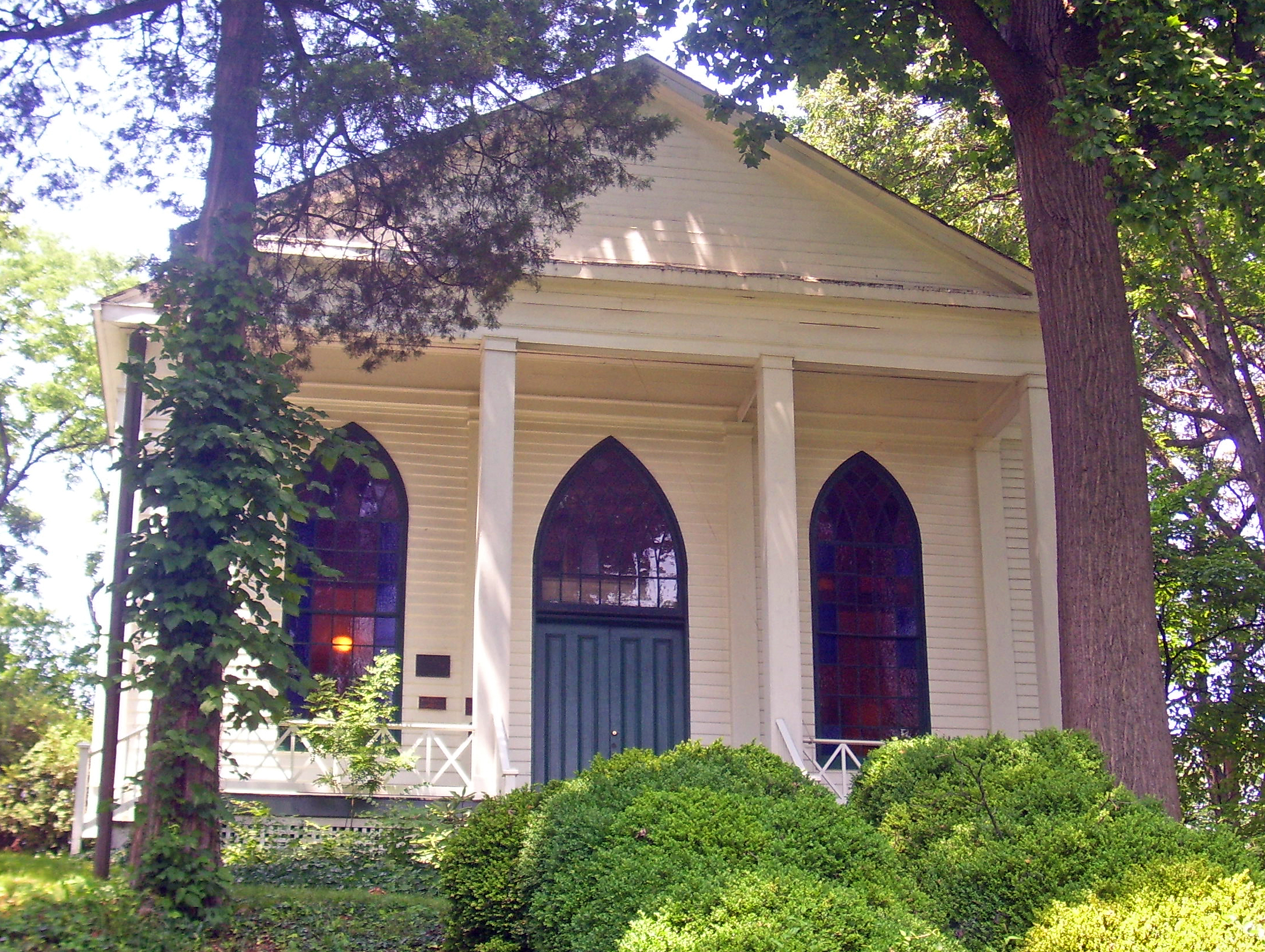
- Front elevation, 2008

- Location within Maryland Location within the United States
- Location: 9400 Rockville Pike., Bethesda, Maryland
- Coordinates: 39°0′35″N 77°5′54″W
- Area: 0 acres (0 ha)
- Architectural style: Greek Revival, Queen Anne
- NRHP reference No.: 77000699
- Added to NRHP: July 17, 1978

The Bethesda Meeting House is a historic Presbyterian church complex in Bethesda, Montgomery County, Maryland, US. Its name became the namesake of the entire surrounding community in the 1870s. It sits on Maryland Route 355 (known as Rockville Pike at this point) just inside the Capital Beltway. It has been listed on the National Register of Historic Places since 1977.

== Description ==
The Bethesda Meeting House property includes the 1850 meeting house itself, the mid-late 19th-century parsonage to the south, and the associated cemetery. The church is a large, wood-frame structure built in the Greek Revival "temple" form, albeit with Gothic-style windows. To the south of the church is a two-story frame Victorian parsonage built on a cruciform plan, with some Queen Anne-style embellishments.

== History ==
The church was built on the foundation of an 1820 Presbyterian church that burned down in 1849. Opened in 1850, it served as the Bethesda Presbyterian Church until 1925, when the congregation erected a new church on Wilson Lane, farther south in Bethesda. When the church moved to its new location in 1925, the trustees sold the building and 7 acres (2.8 ha) of land to Mrs. May Fitch Kelley. The Presbyterian congregation, however, retained ownership of the cemetery.

Mrs. Kelley lived in the church building for many years. In 1945, the property was sold to a French Algerian Catholic missionary group called the Missionaries of Africa, commonly known as the White Fathers. In the 1950s, the property was transferred again, this time to the trustees of the Temple Hill Baptist Church. Its pastor ,Rev. Phillip Buford, who lived on and maintained the property, died in February 2022. Since Buford's death, the congregation no longer met regularly in the Meeting House and could no longer maintain it properly.

On January 8, 2024, the Bethesda Meeting House Foundation purchased the church with plans to restore it and preserve it for the future.

== Legacy ==
In the 1860s, the church's pastor, Rev. Edward Henry Cumpston, began lobbying the local postmaster, Robert Franck, to rename his post office from "Darcy's Store". Franck did so in 1871, and the surrounding community took the name as well.
