= Rillington =

Village and civil parish in North Yorkshire, England

Coordinates: 54°09′30″N 0°41′38″W

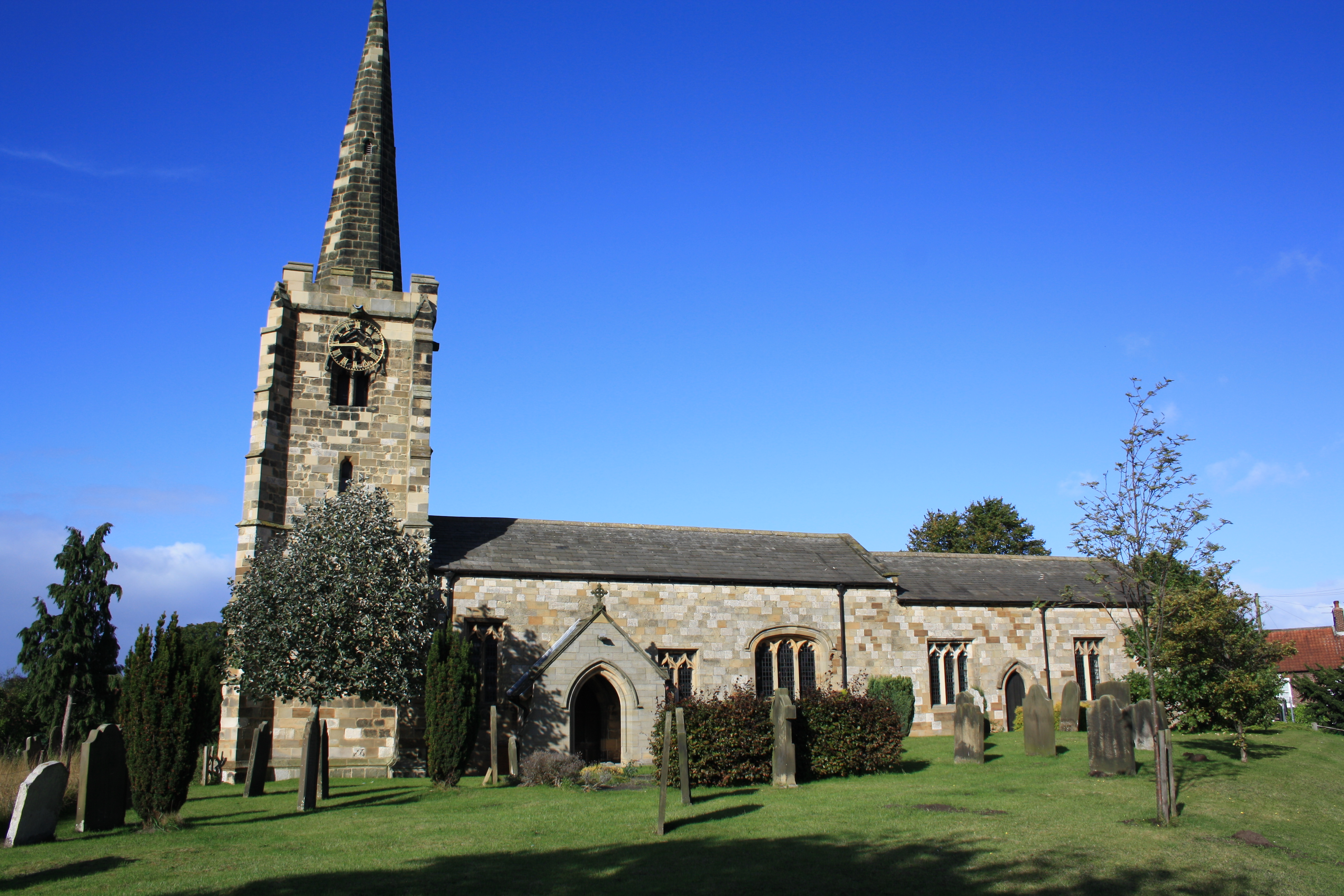
- St Andrew's Church, Rillington

- Location within North Yorkshire
- Population: 1,114 (2011 census)
- OS grid reference: SE853743
- Unitary authority: North Yorkshire
- Ceremonial county: North Yorkshire
- Region: Yorkshire and the Humber
- Country: England
- Sovereign state: United Kingdom
- Post town: MALTON
- Postcode district: YO17
- Dialling code: 01944
- Police: North Yorkshire
- Fire: North Yorkshire
- Ambulance: Yorkshire
- UK Parliament: Thirsk and Malton

Rillington is a village and civil parish in North Yorkshire, England.

The name Rillington derives from the Old English Redelingtūn or Hrethelingtūn, meaning 'settlement connected with Redel' or 'Hrethel'.

Rillington was mentioned in the Domesday Survey in 1086 and rural life was relatively unchanged until the coming of the railway in 1845.

The village has two pubs the Coach and Horses and The Fleece, both are located next to St Andrew's Church, Rillington, and the A64.

== Transport ==
Rillington is on the A64 road, approximately 3 miles (5 km) east of Malton and south-west of Scarborough.

A regular Yorkshire Coastliner bus service providing connections to Scarborough, Malton, York and Leeds is operated by Transdev Blazefield.

From 1845 until 1930 the village was served by a railway station which connected Rillington on the York to Scarborough Line. Special trains continued until the 1960s, although the station has now been demolished.

== Governance ==
Rillington was historically part of the East Riding of Yorkshire until 1974. From 1974 to 2023 it was part of the district of Ryedale, it is now administered by the unitary North Yorkshire Council. Rillington also has its own Parish Council.

An electoral ward in the same name exists. The population of the ward at the 2011 Census was 1,743.

Ryedale District Councillors
Year	Party	Member
1973	Independent	Cllr S Harrison
1987	Independent	Cllr Brian Maud
1991	Liberal Democrats	Cllr Ms G Wilkinson
1999	Independent	Cllr Brian Maud
2019	Conservative	Cllr Nathan Garbutt-Moore

Both Cllr Brian Maud and Cllr Nathan Garbutt-Moore served as Chairman of the Ryedale District Council while representing Rillington.

== Education ==
The village is served by Rillington Community Primary School. It also falls within the catchment area for Norton College.

Friends of Rillington School is a registered charity that raises funds for the Primary School.

== Infamy ==
It was after this village that Rillington Place in Notting Hill west London was named.

== See also ==
- Listed buildings in Rillington
