= Merthyr Tydfil County Borough =

County borough in Wales

Merthyr Tydfil County Borough Bwrdeistref Sirol Merthyr Tudful (Welsh)
- County borough
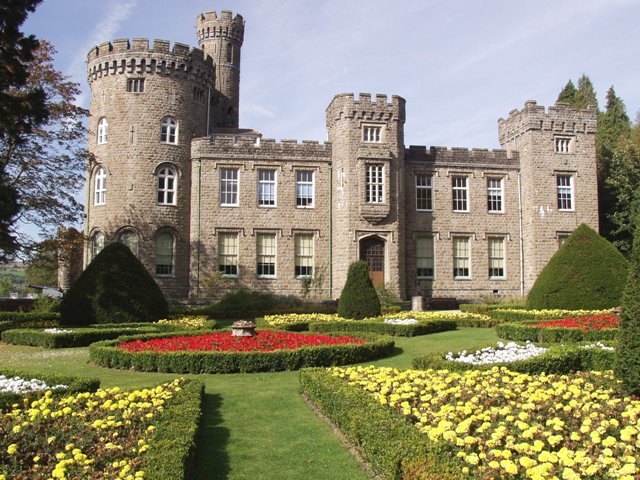
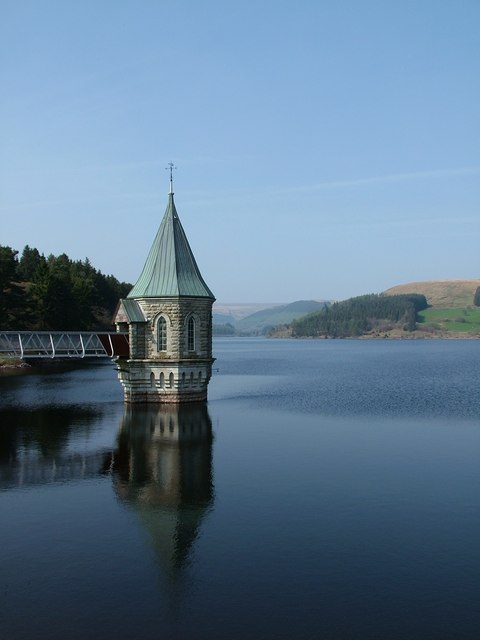
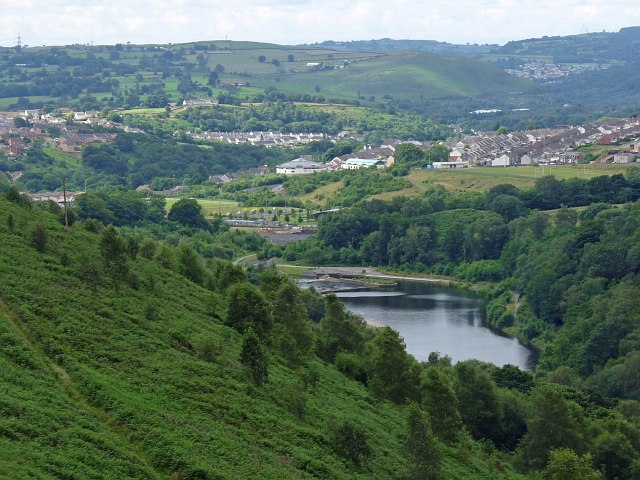
- Left to right: Cyfarthfa Castle near Merthyr Tydfil; Water tower at Pontsticill Reservoir; Taff Bargoed Community Park, Treharris

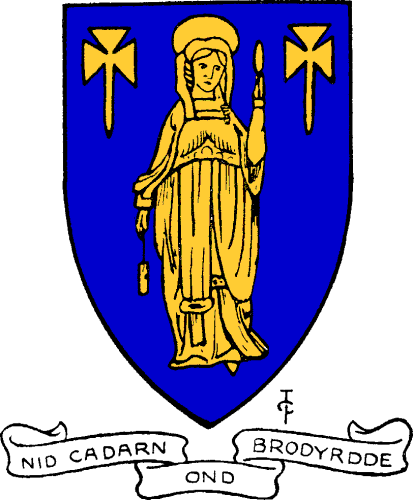
- Coat of arms
- Motto: Welsh: Nid Cadarn Ond Brodyrdde lit. 'not force but fellowship' or 'only brotherhood is strong'
- Merthyr Tydfil shown within Wales
- Coordinates: 51°45′N 3°23′W
- Sovereign state: United Kingdom
- Country: Wales
- Preserved county: Mid Glamorgan
- Incorporated: 1 April 1974
- Unitary authority: 1 April 1996
- Named for: Merthyr Tydfil
- Administrative HQ: Civic Centre, Merthyr Tydfil

Government
  - Type: Principal council
  - Body: Merthyr Tydfil County Borough Council
  - Control: No overall control
  - MPs: Gerald Jones (L)
  - MSs: 6 in Pontypridd Cynon Merthyr

Area
  - Total: 43 sq mi (111 km^{2})
  - Rank: 21st

Population (2025)
  - Total: 58,362
  - Rank: 22nd
  - Density: 1,360/sq mi (524/km^{2})

Welsh language (2021)
  - Speakers: 8.9%
  - Rank: 15th
- Time zone: UTC+0 (GMT)
  - Summer (DST): UTC+1 (BST)
- ISO 3166 code: GB-MTY
- GSS code: W06000024
- Website: merthyr.gov.uk

Merthyr Tydfil County Borough (Welsh: Bwrdeistref Sirol Merthyr Tudful) is a county borough in the south-east of Wales. In 2025, it had an estimated population of 58,362, making it the smallest local authority in Wales by population. It is located in the historic county of Glamorgan and takes its name from the town with the same name. The county borough consists of the northern part of the Taff Valley and the smaller neighbouring Taff Bargoed Valley. It borders the counties of Rhondda Cynon Taf to the west, Caerphilly County Borough to the east, and Powys to the north. The area was awarded county borough status in 1908 until the original county borough was abolished in 1974. In 1996, Merthyr Tydfil became a principal area and one that is styled as a "county borough" in recognition of its historical status.

== History ==
=== Pre-industrial Merthyr ===
What is now Merthyr Tydfil town centre was originally little more than a village. An ironworks existed in the parish in the Elizabethan period, but it did not survive beyond the early 1640s at the latest. In 1754, it was recorded that the valley was almost entirely populated by shepherds. Farm produce was traded at many markets and fairs, notably the Waun Fair above Dowlais.

=== The Industrial Revolution ===
==== Influence and growth of iron industry ====
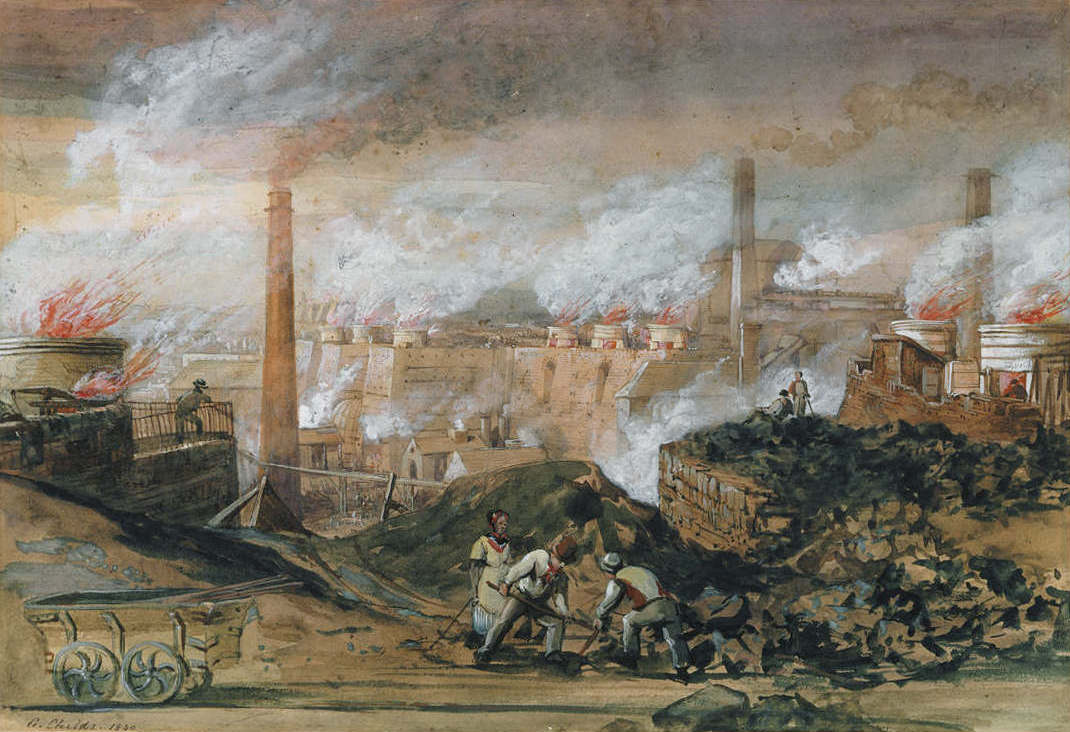
Dowlais Ironworks by George Childs (1840)

What is now Merthyr Tydfil County Borough was situated close to reserves of iron ore, coal, limestone and water, making it an ideal site for ironworks. Small-scale iron working and coal mining had been carried out at some places in South Wales since the Tudor period, but in the wake of the Industrial Revolution the demand for iron led to the rapid expansion of Merthyr's iron operations in the northern half of the County Borough. The Dowlais Ironworks was founded by what would become the Dowlais Iron Company in 1759, making it the first major works in the area. It was followed in 1765 by the Cyfarthfa Ironworks. The Plymouth Ironworks were initially in the same ownership as Cyfarthfa, but passed after the death of Anthony Bacon to Richard Hill in 1788. The fourth ironworks was Penydarren built by Francis Homfray and Samuel Homfray after 1784.

The demand for iron was fuelled by the Royal Navy, who needed cannon for their ships, and later by the railways. In 1802, Admiral Lord Nelson visited Merthyr to witness cannon being made.

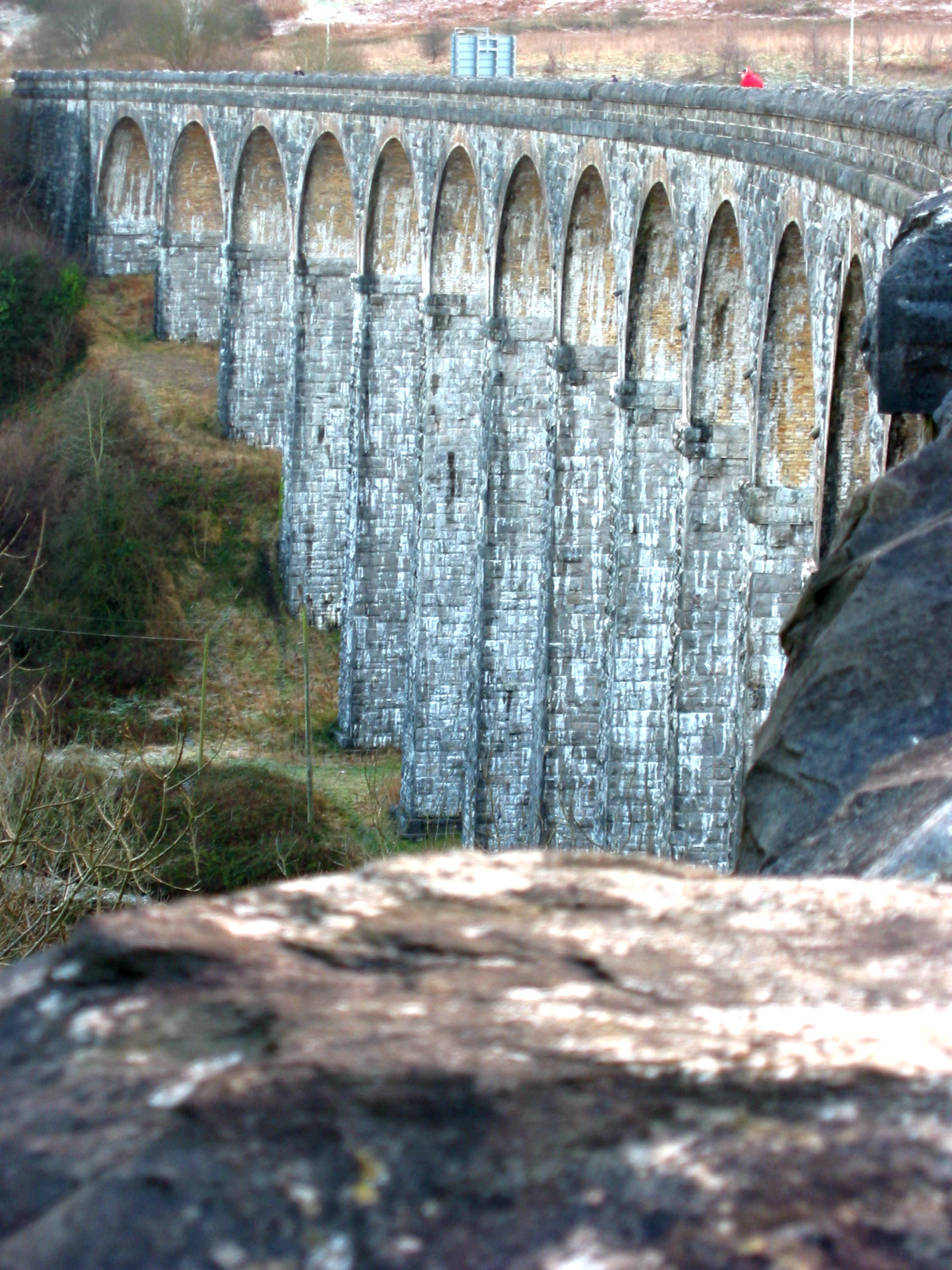
The Cefn Coed Viaduct was built to carry the Brecon and Merthyr Railway

Several railway companies established routes that linked Merthyr with coastal ports or other parts of Britain. They included the Brecon and Merthyr Railway, Vale of Neath Railway, Taff Vale Railway and Great Western Railway. They often shared routes to enable access to coal mines and ironworks through rugged country, which presented great engineering challenges. In 1804, the world's first railway steam locomotive, "The Iron Horse", developed by the Cornish engineer Richard Trevithick, pulled 10 tons of iron on the newly constructed Merthyr Tramway from Penydarren to Abercynon. A replica of this now resides in the National Waterfront Museum in Swansea. The tramway passed through what is arguably the oldest railway tunnel in the world, part of which can still be seen alongside Pentrebach Road at the lower end of the town.

The 1801 census recorded the population of Merthyr as 7705, the most populous parish in Wales (however, the built-up area of Swansea, covering several parishes, then exceeded 10,000). By 1851 Merthyr had overtaken Swansea to become the largest town in Wales with 46,378 inhabitants. By this time, Irish immigrants made up 10% of the local population, and there were substantial numbers of English, together with some Spaniards and Italians. A Jewish community was established some time after 1841, and by 1851, they were able to establish a small prayer hall. The charming Merthyr Synagogue was consecrated in 1875 and a cemetery at Cefn-Coed was established in the 1860s.

During the first few decades of the 19th century, the ironworks at Dowlais and Cyfarthfa continued to expand and at their peak were the most productive ironworks in the world. 50,000 tons of rails left just one ironworks in 1844, to enable expansion of railways across Russia to Siberia. At its peak, the Dowlais Iron Company operated 18 blast furnaces and employed 7,300 people, and by 1857 had constructed the world's most powerful rolling mill. The companies were mainly owned by two dynasties, the Guest and Crawshay families. One of the famous members of the Guest family was Lady Charlotte Guest who translated the Mabinogion into English from its original Welsh. The families also supported the establishment of schools for their workers.

Thomas Carlyle visited Merthyr town in 1850, writing that it was filled with such "unguided, hard-worked, fierce, and miserable-looking sons of Adam I never saw before. Ah me ! It is like a vision of Hell, and will never leave me, that of these poor creatures broiling, all in sweat and dirt, amid their furnaces, pits, and rolling mills."

==== The Merthyr Rising ====
The Merthyr Rising of 1831 were precipitated by a combination of the ruthless collection of debts, frequent wage reductions when the value of iron periodically fell, and the imposition of truck shops. Some workers were paid in specially minted coins or credit notes, known as "truck" which could only be exchanged at shops owned by their employers. Many of the workers objected to both the price and quality of the goods sold in these shops.

Some 7,000 to 10,000 workers marched and, for four days, magistrates and ironmasters were under siege in the Castle Hotel, and the protesters effectively controlled Merthyr. Soldiers, called in from Brecon, clashed with the rioters, and several on both sides were killed. Despite the hope that they could negotiate with the owners, the skilled workers lost control of the movement.

Several of the supposed leaders of the riots were arrested. One of them, Richard Lewis, popularly known as Dic Penderyn, was hanged for the crime of stabbing a soldier named Donald Black in the leg. Lewis became known as the first local working-class martyr.

Alexander Cordell's low-brow novel The Fire People is set in this period. A more serious political history of these events, The Merthyr Rising was written by the Merthyr-born Marxist writer Professor Gwyn A. Williams in 1978.

The rising helped create the momentum that led to the Reform Act. The Chartism movement, which did not consider these reforms extensive enough, was subsequently active in Merthyr.

=== The decline of coal and iron ===
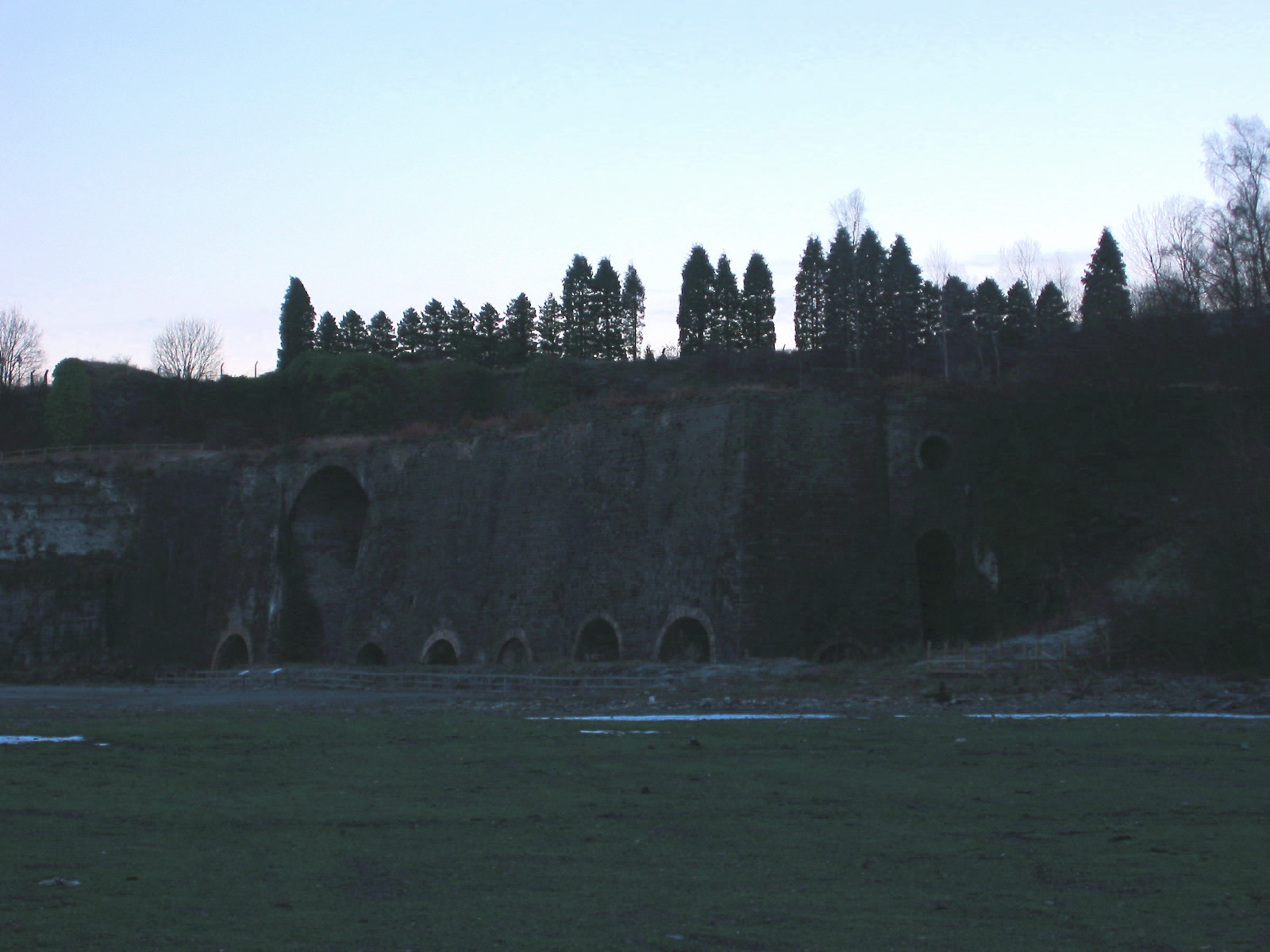
The abandoned Cyfarthfa Ironworks blast furnaces

The steel and coal industries began to decline after World War I, and by the 1930s, they had all closed. By 1932, more than 80% of men in Dowlais were unemployed; Merthyr experienced an out-migration of 27,000 people in the 1920s and 1930s, and a Royal Commission recommended that the town's county borough status should be abolished. The fortunes of Merthyr revived temporarily during World War II, as war-related industry was established in the area. In the post-war years the local economy became increasingly reliant on light manufacturing, often providing employment for women rather than men.

In 1987, the iron foundry, all that remained of the former Dowlais ironworks, finally closed, marking the end of 228 years continuous production on one site.

=== Post-Second World War ===
Immediately following the Second World War, several large companies set up in Merthyr. In October 1948 the American-owned Hoover Company opened a large washing machine factory and depot in the village of Pentrebach, a few miles south of the town. The factory was purpose-built to manufacture the Hoover Electric Washing Machine, and at one point Hoover was the largest employer in the borough. Later the Sinclair C5 was built the same factory.

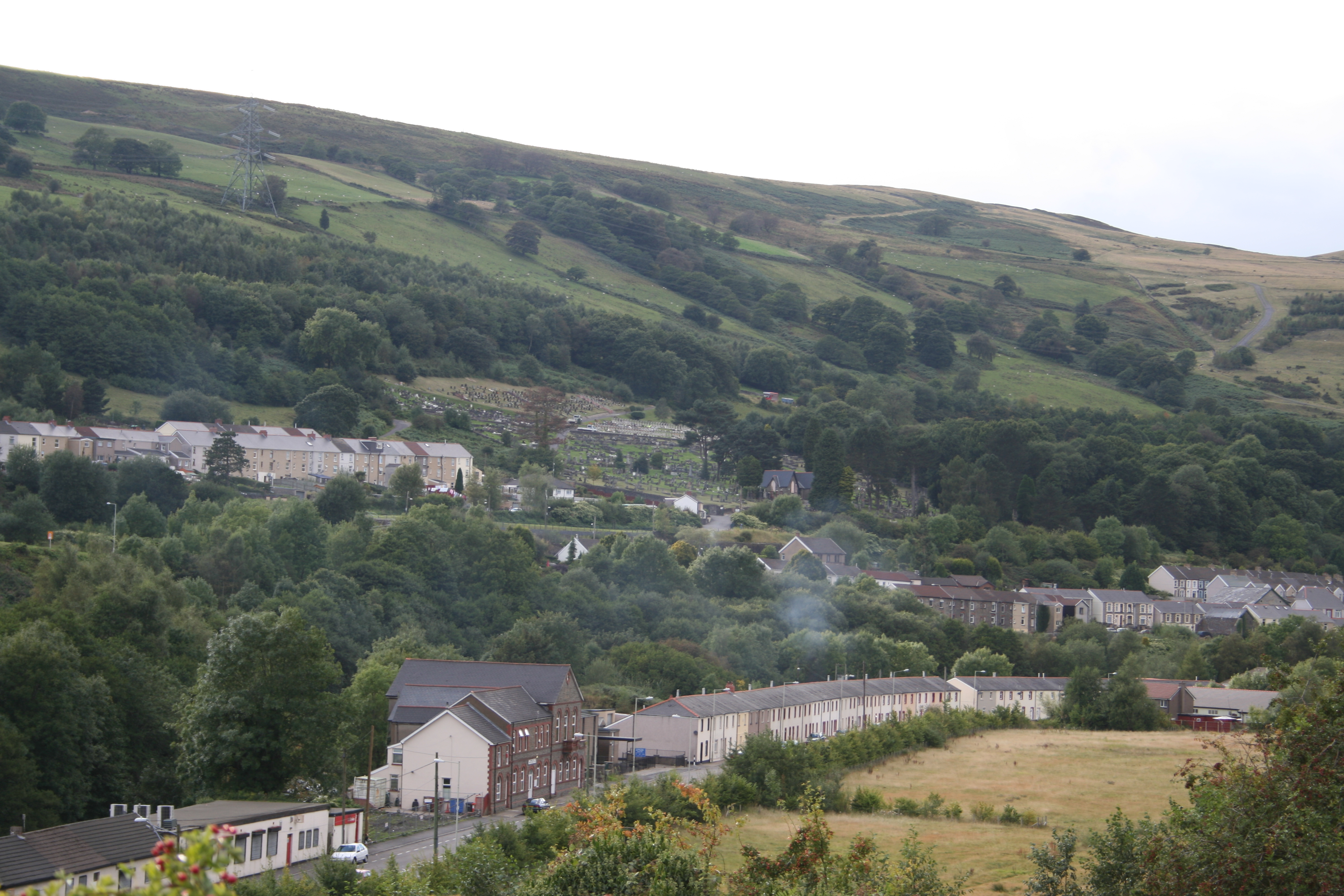
View across Aberfan in 2007

Several other companies built factories, including the aviation components company Teddington Aircraft Controls, which opened in 1946. The Teddington factory closed in the early 1970s. The local Merthyr Tydfil Institute for the Blind, founded in 1923, remains the oldest active manufacturer in the town.

The Gurnos housing estate was established by Merthyr Tydfil Council in the early 1950s and expanded over many years. Cyfarthfa, the former home of the ironmaster William Crawshay II, an opulent mock-castle, is now a museum. It houses a number of paintings of the town, a large collection of artefacts from the town's Industrial Revolution period, and a notable collection of Egyptian tomb artefacts, including several sarcophagi.

On 21 October 1966 a colliery tip slid down a mountain at Aberfan, 4 miles (6.4 km) south of Merthyr, covering the village school and causing the Aberfan disaster.

In 1992, while testing a new angina treatment in Merthyr Tydfil, researchers discovered that the new drug had erection-stimulating side effects for some of the healthy volunteers in the trial study. This discovery would go on to form the basis for Viagra.

In 2006 inventor Howard Stapleton, based in Merthyr Tydfil, developed the technology that has given rise to the recent mosquitotone or Teen Buzz phenomenon.

== Open cast mining ==
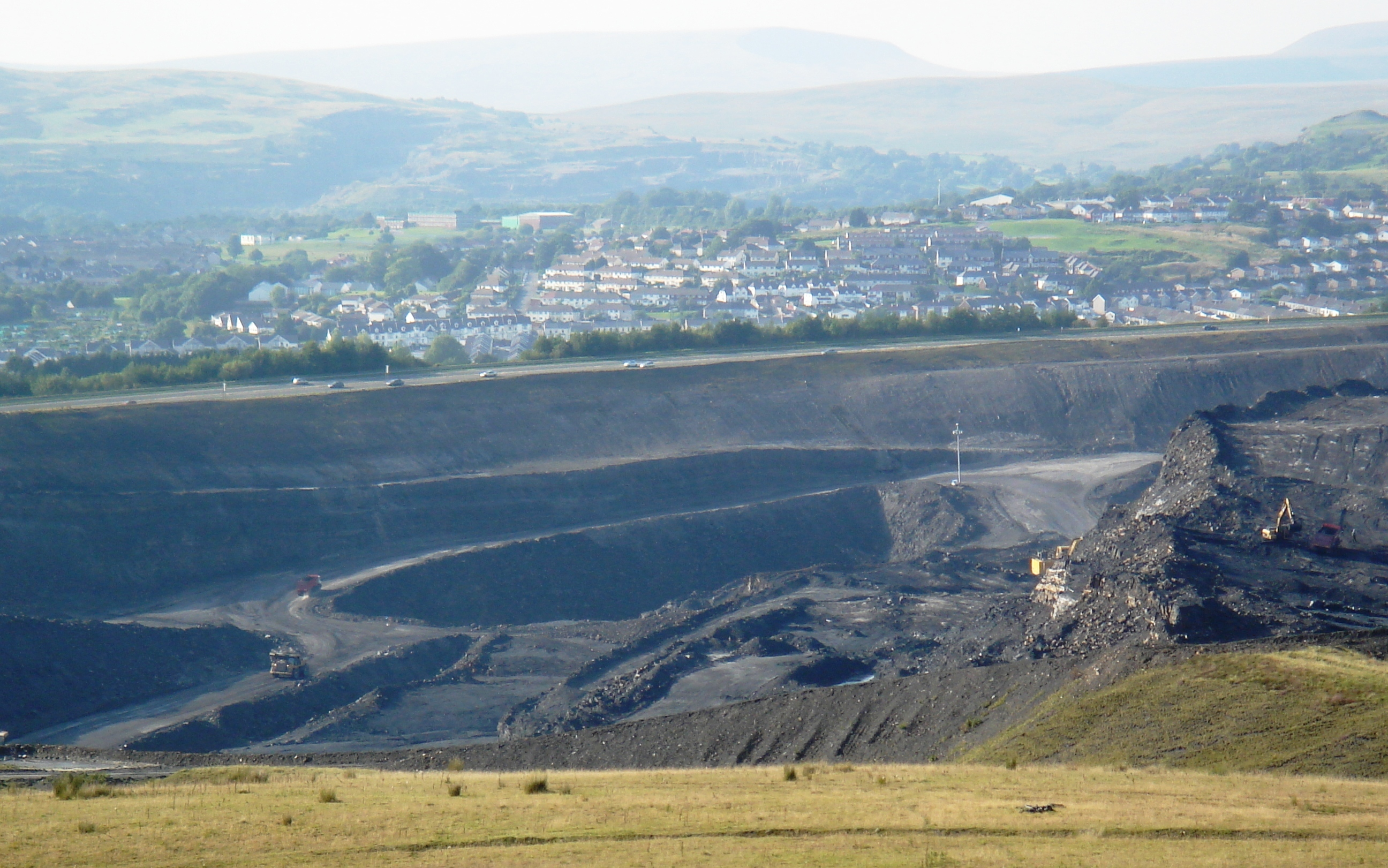
Part of Ffos Y Fran open cast mine, overlooking Dowlais, Penydarren and Gurnos, with the Breacon Beacons in the distance.

In 2006, a large open cast coal mine, which will extract 10 million tonnes of coal over 15 years, was authorised just east of Dowlais as part of the Ffos-y-fran Opencast mine.

== Industrial legacy ==
Merthyr Tydfil has a long and varied industrial heritage, and was one of the seats of the Industrial Revolution. Since the end of the Second World War, much of this has declined, with the closure of long-established coal mining collieries, and both steel and ironworks. Despite recent improvements, some parts of the County Borough remain economically disadvantaged, and there is a significant proportion of the community who are long-term unemployed.

In Britain today, Merthyr Tydfil:

- Ranks 13th worst for economic activity
- Ranks 13th worst for life expectancy: women live on average 79.1 years, and men 75.5. This is lower than the average for England but better than the Scottish and north of England averages
- Has 30% of the population suffering from a limiting long-term illness.

A Channel 4 programme rated Merthyr Tydfil as the third worst place to live in Britain in 2006 following areas of London.
However, in the 2007 edition of the same programme, Merthyr had 'improved' to fifth worst place to live.

== Governance ==
Merthyr Tydfil County Borough Council is the governing body for the area. It consists of 30 councillors representing 11 wards.

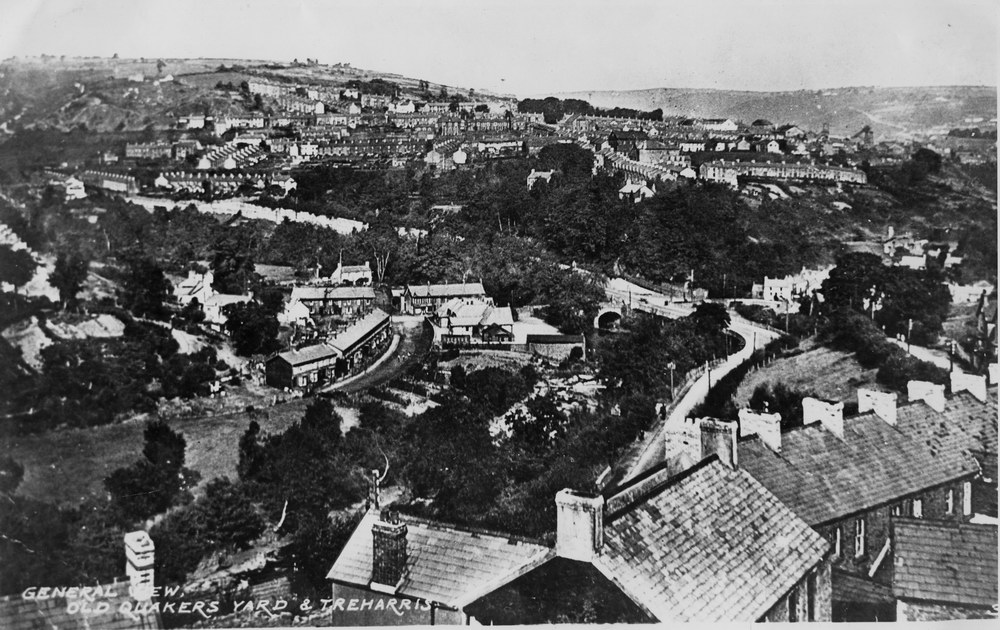
Historical photograph of Quakers Yard, in the south of the county borough

The current Member of Parliament for the Merthyr Tydfil and Aberdare constituency is Gerald Jones MP. In the Senedd, Merthyr Tydfil County Borough became part of the new Pontypridd Cynon Merthyr Senedd seat in 2026.

The county borough is divided into twelve communities. Only one of the communities has a community council, being Bedlinog (also covering Trelewis), in the Taff Bargoed Valley to the east of the borough. The Bedlinog community covers the area that was transferred to the borough of Merthyr Tydfil in 1974 from Gelligaer Urban District under the Local Government Act 1972.

=== Administrative history ===
Merthyr Tydfil was an ancient parish within the county of Glamorgan. As well as the village of Merthyr Tydfil itself, the parish covered much of the upper Taff Valley, including settlements stretching from Dowlais in the north to Aberfan and Treharris in the south. It was governed by its parish vestry, in the same way as most rural parishes. As the area rapidly developed during the industrial revolution, it was decided that a more formal type of local government was required, particularly to oversee sanitation and public health in the parish. The parish was made a Local Board District on 19 June 1850, governed by an elected local board of health.

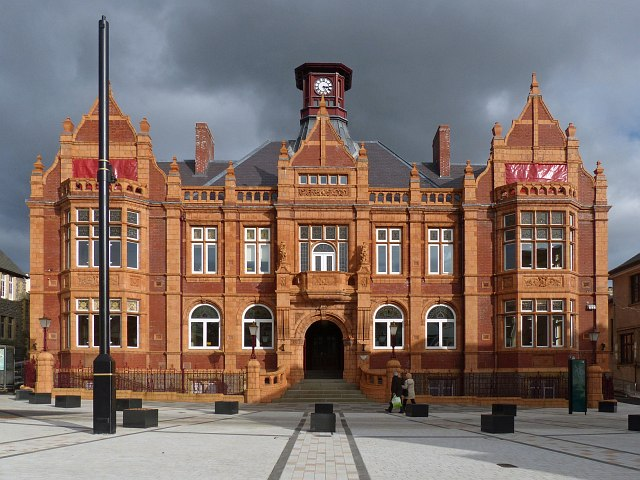
Merthyr Tydfil Town Hall

Under the Local Government Act 1894, local boards such as the Merthyr Tydfil Local Board were reconstituted as urban districts with effect from 31 December 1894. Shortly afterwards the new council commissioned the construction of Merthyr Tydfil Town Hall, which opened in 1898. The Merthyr Tydfil Urban District was elevated to municipal borough status in 1905.

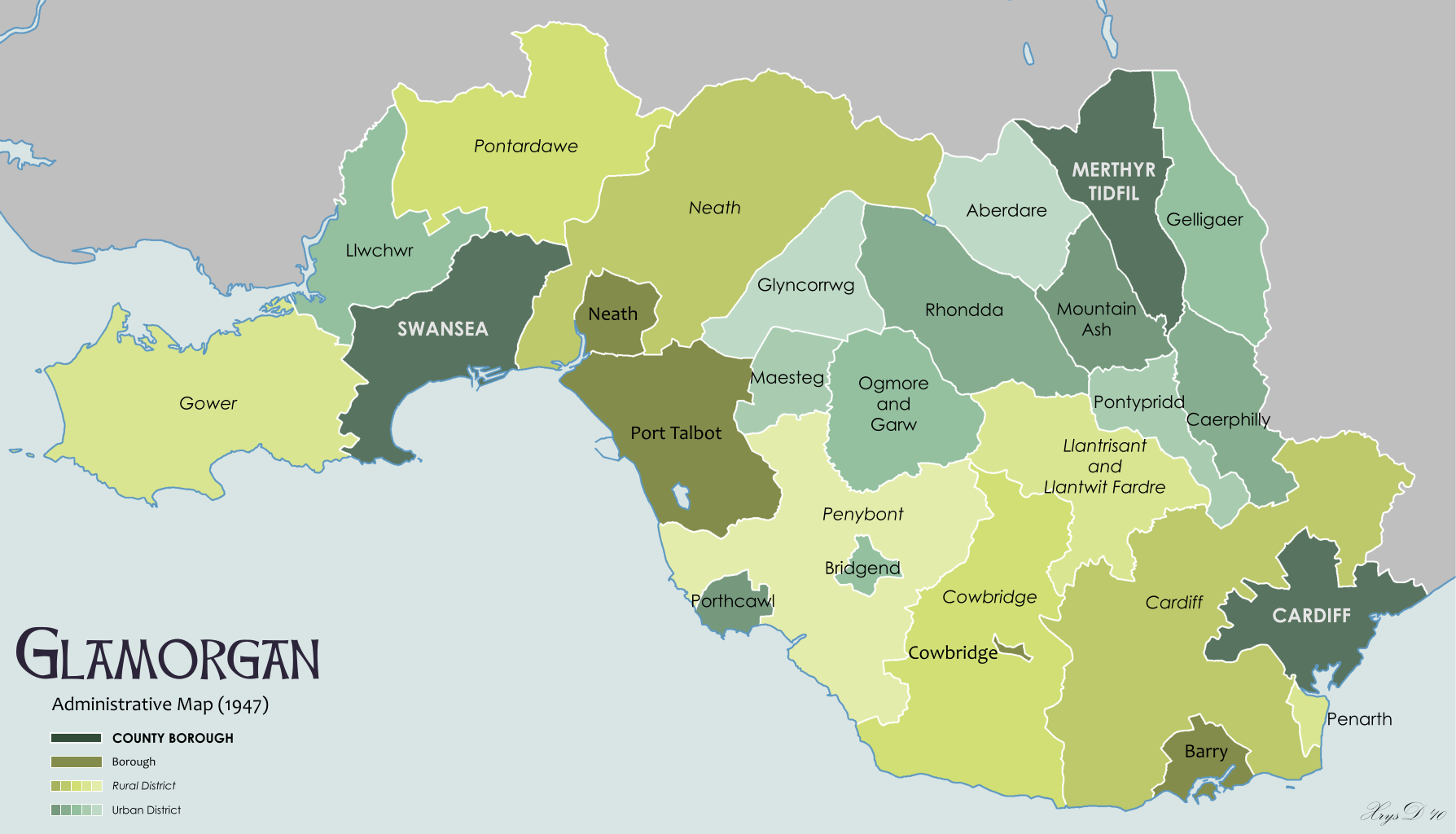
Administrative map of the County of Glamorgan in 1947, with an older Merthyr Tydfil County Borough boundary.

Three years later, in 1908, the borough was elevated to county borough status, taking over the county-level services previously provided by Glamorgan County Council in the area. This was despite protests from the southern part of the borough, where it was claimed that links were stronger with Pontypridd. In 1935, a Royal Commission argued that Merthyr Tydfil County Borough, then heavily burdened by the cost of maintaining many unemployed people, should be abolished and merged with Glamorgan. The county council refused the proposal.

County boroughs were abolished in 1974 under the Local Government Act 1972, when a system of upper-tier counties and lower-tier districts was applied across Wales. On 1 April 1974 Merthyr Tydfil became a lower-tier district with borough status within the new county of Mid Glamorgan. The new borough was also given a larger territory than the old county borough, gaining the parish of Vaynor from Brecknockshire and the Bedlinog ward from Gelligaer Urban District. Civil parishes in Wales were replaced at the same time with communities, with the borough of Merthyr Tydfil initially comprising three communities in 1974: Merthyr Tydfil (covering the area of the pre-1974 county borough), Vaynor, and Bedlinog. The communities within the borough were reorganised in 1983, when the Merthyr Tydfil community was split into ten communities: Cyfarthfa, Dowlais, Gurnos, Merthyr Vale, Pant, Park, Penydarren, Town, Treharris, and Troed-y-rhiw. Of the twelve communities in the borough, only Bedlinog has a community council.

Further local government reorganisation in 1996 saw Wales divided into unitary authorities, called either counties or county boroughs. Merthyr Tydfil became a county borough again on 1 April 1996, taking over county-level functions from the abolished Mid Glamorgan County Council.

== Culture ==
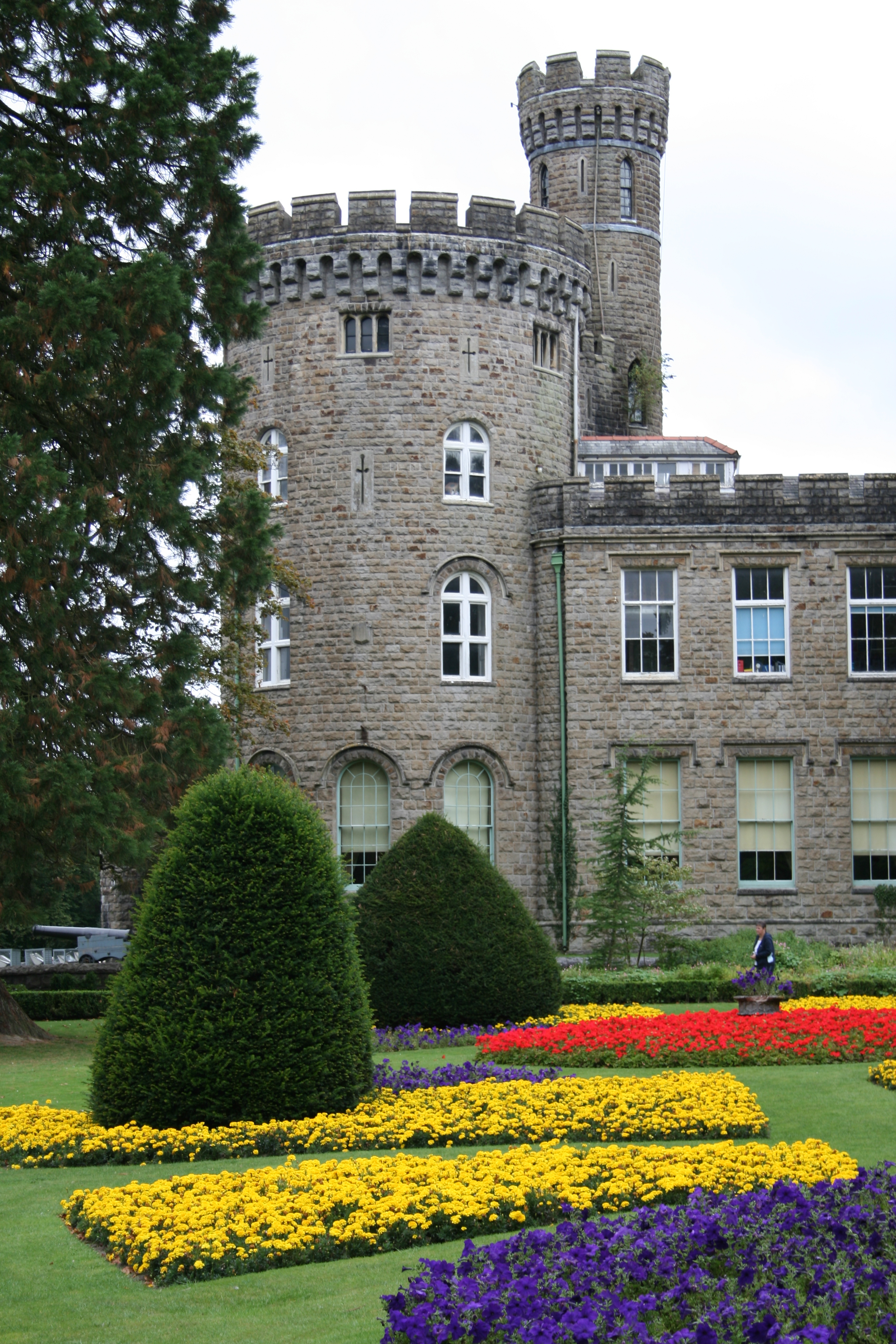
Cyfarthfa Castle, commissioned in 1824 by the ironmaster William Crawshay II, is today a museum & art gallery, with its park and grounds used for festivals and events

Merthyr Tydfil County Borough is home to several established choirs who perform frequently in the local area and abroad. They include Ynysowen Male Choir, Treharris Male Voice Choir, Dowlais Male Voice Choir, Merthyr Tydfil Ladies Choir, Cantorion Cyfarthfa, and the mixed-voice choir Con Voce. Merthyr Tydfil County Borough has held many cultural events. Local poets and writers hold poetry evenings in the town, and music festivals are organised at Cyfarthfa Castle and Park. With this in mind, Menter Iaith Merthyr Tudful (The Merthyr Tydfil Welsh Language Initiative) have successfully transformed the Zoar Chapel and the adjacent vestry building in Pontmorlais into a community arts venue: Canolfan Soar and Theatr Soar, who now run a whole programme of performance events and activities through both the Welsh and English languages, together with a cafe and book shop, specialising in local interest and Welsh language books and CDs.

Merthyr Tydfil Housing Association, working in partnership with Canolfan Soar, has been successful in raising funding to turn the Pontmorlais area into a cultural quarter. With references to the 1831 Merthyr Rising and the red bricks of its facade, a new arts and creative industries centre was launched in Merthyr Tydfil Town Hall on Saint David's Day 2014 under the name "Redhouse Cymru".

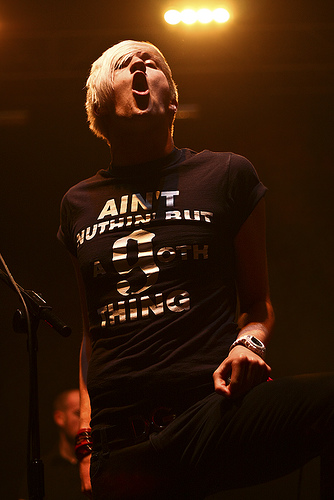
Sean Smith from Heolgerrig band The Blackout performing Live in London in 2009

Merthyr has several historical and heritage groups:

- The Merthyr Tydfil Heritage Regeneration Trust, which has as its aim:

"To preserve for the benefit of the residents of Merthyr Tydfil and of the Nation at large whatever of the Historical, Architectural and Constructional Heritage may exist in and around Merthyr Tydfil in the form of buildings and artefacts of particular beauty or of Historical, Architectural or Constructional interest and also to improve, conserve and protect the environment thereto."

- The Merthyr Tydfil Historical Society, which has as its aim:

"To advance the education of the public by promoting the study of the local history and architecture of Merthyr Tydfil".

- The Merthyr Tydfil Museum and Heritage Groups, which has as its aim:

"To advance the education of the public by the promotion, support and improvement of the Heritage of Merthyr Tydfil and its Museums."

Merthyr Tydfil's Central Library, which is in a prominent position in the centre of the town, is a Carnegie library.

Merthyr Tydfil hosted the National Eisteddfod in 1881 and 1901 and the national youth Eisteddfod in 1987.

Since 2005 a free multi-cultural festival, Global Village, has been held in Cyfarthfa Park, featuring music, dance, literature, arts and crafts, food and information stalls, workshops and performances from cultures from across the globe, including African music and dance, Thai dance, Japanese Taiko drumming, Native American Hoop Dance, didgeridoo music, Welsh harp, Irish folk music, Welsh folk dance, Indian dance and music, Portuguese Fado singing and much more.

Merthyr, like nearby Aberdare, is also known for its thriving music scene. The county borough has produced several bands which have achieved national success, including The Blackout from Heolgerrig and Midasuno from Troedyrhiw. Since 2011 Cyfarthfa Park has now also become the home of the Merthyr Rock Festival, and from 2009 until 2012 a weekend Welsh language music festival, Bedroc, was held at Bedlinog, featuring major Welsh language acts, together with local artists including Welsh language activist Jamie Bevan with bands Y Betti Galws and Y Gweddillion (The Remnants).

== Tourism ==
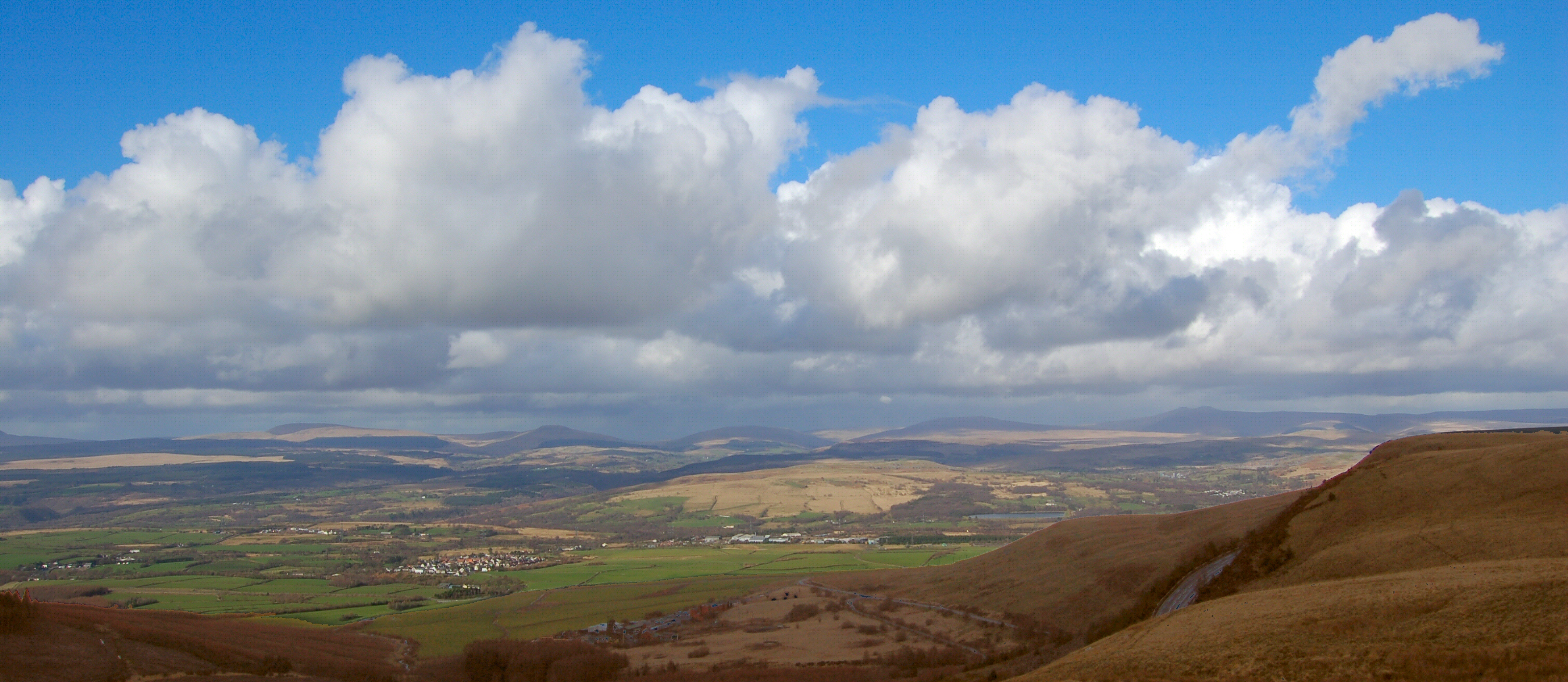
Looking north over the Brecon Beacons

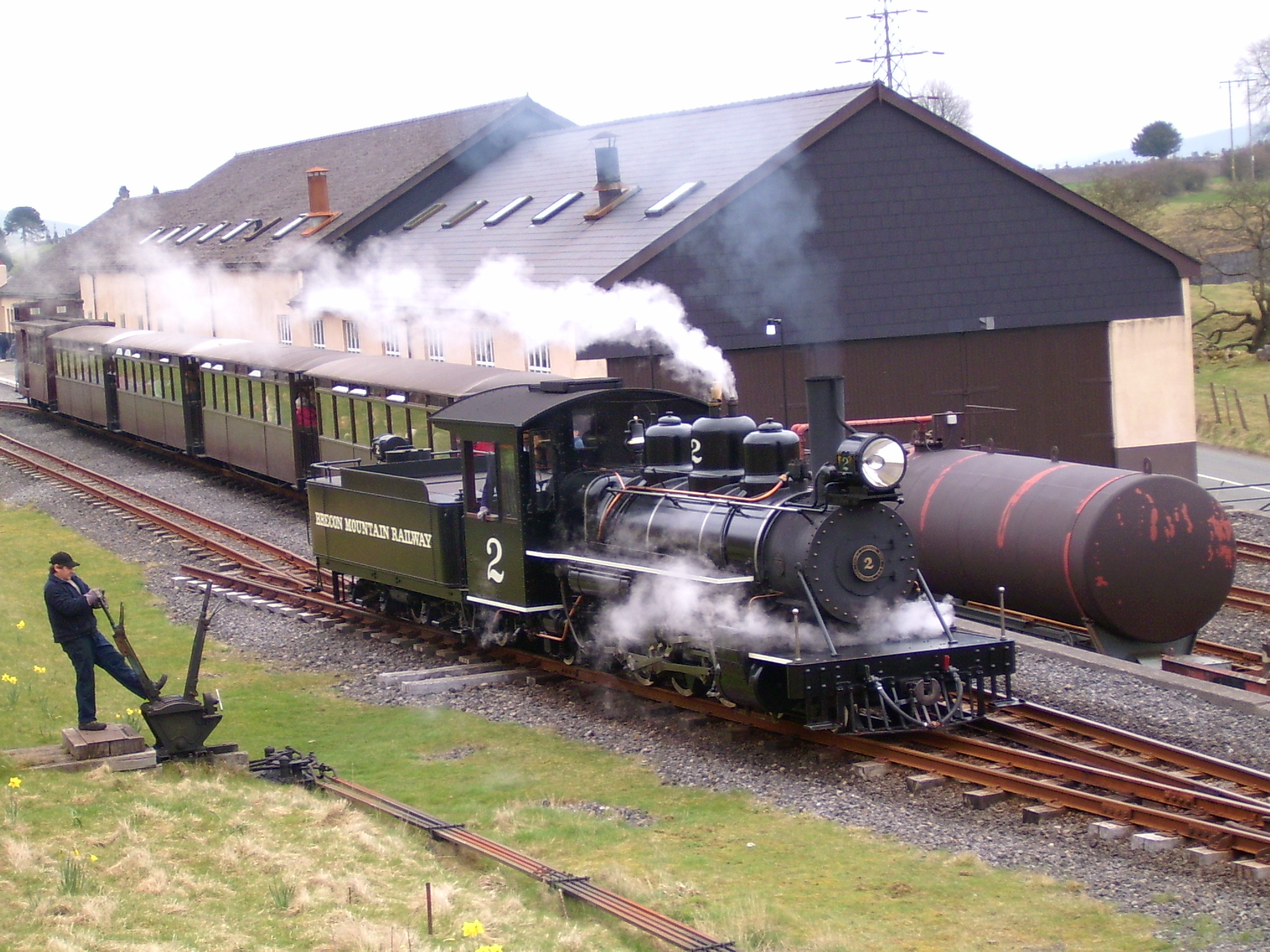
Brecon Mountain Railway at Pant, in the north of Merthyr Tydfil County Borough

The County Borough is located in a South Wales Valleys environment overlapping into the south of the Brecon Beacons National Park, and this, along with the area's rich history, means it has huge potential for tourism in Wales. National Cycle Route 8 passes through the County Borough. The Brecon Mountain Railway is located within the Brecon Beacons National Park, in the north of Merthyr Tydfil County Borough, starting at Pant and currently running to Dolygaer (though there are plans to extend it further). The Fforest Fawr Geopark, designated in 2005 in respect of the area's outstanding geological and cultural heritage, also falls within the northern border of Merthyr Tydfil County Borough. The borough was awarded European funding as part of the Interreg Collabor8 project, and will be working in partnership with the Brecon Beacons National Park Authority to promote the region across Europe.

The Taff Bargoed Valley is increasingly becoming an area for outdoor activities and is home to Parc Taff Bargoed and the Summit Centre (formerly Welsh International Climbing Centre). Settlements of interest include Bedlinog, Quakers Yard, Nelson, Trelewis, and Treharris.

== Transport ==
=== Roads ===
Road improvements mean the county borough is increasingly a commuter location and has shown some of the highest house price growth in the UK.

== Railways ==
Regular rail services operate from Merthyr Tydfil railway station, through stations at Pentrebach, Troedyrhiw, Merthyr Vale and Quakers Yard in the County Borough to Cardiff Queen Street and Cardiff Central. Public transport links to Cardiff are being improved.

== Employment ==
Modern-day Merthyr relies on a combination of public sector and manufacturing and service sector companies to provide employment. The Welsh Assembly Government has recently opened a major office just outside the town centre near a large telecommunications call centre (T-Mobile). Hoover (now part of the Candy Group) has its registered office in the town and remained a major employer until it transferred production abroad in March 2009, resulting in the loss of 337 jobs after the closure of its factory.

== Sports and leisure ==
Cricket

Penydarren Country XI Cricket Club is the oldest established cricket club in the Merthyr Tydfil County Borough. Penydarren Country XI Cricket Club was founded in 1971 and currently play at the ICI Rifle Fields Ground. The club's most successful players are Paul Crump and Kerry Morgan.

Boxing

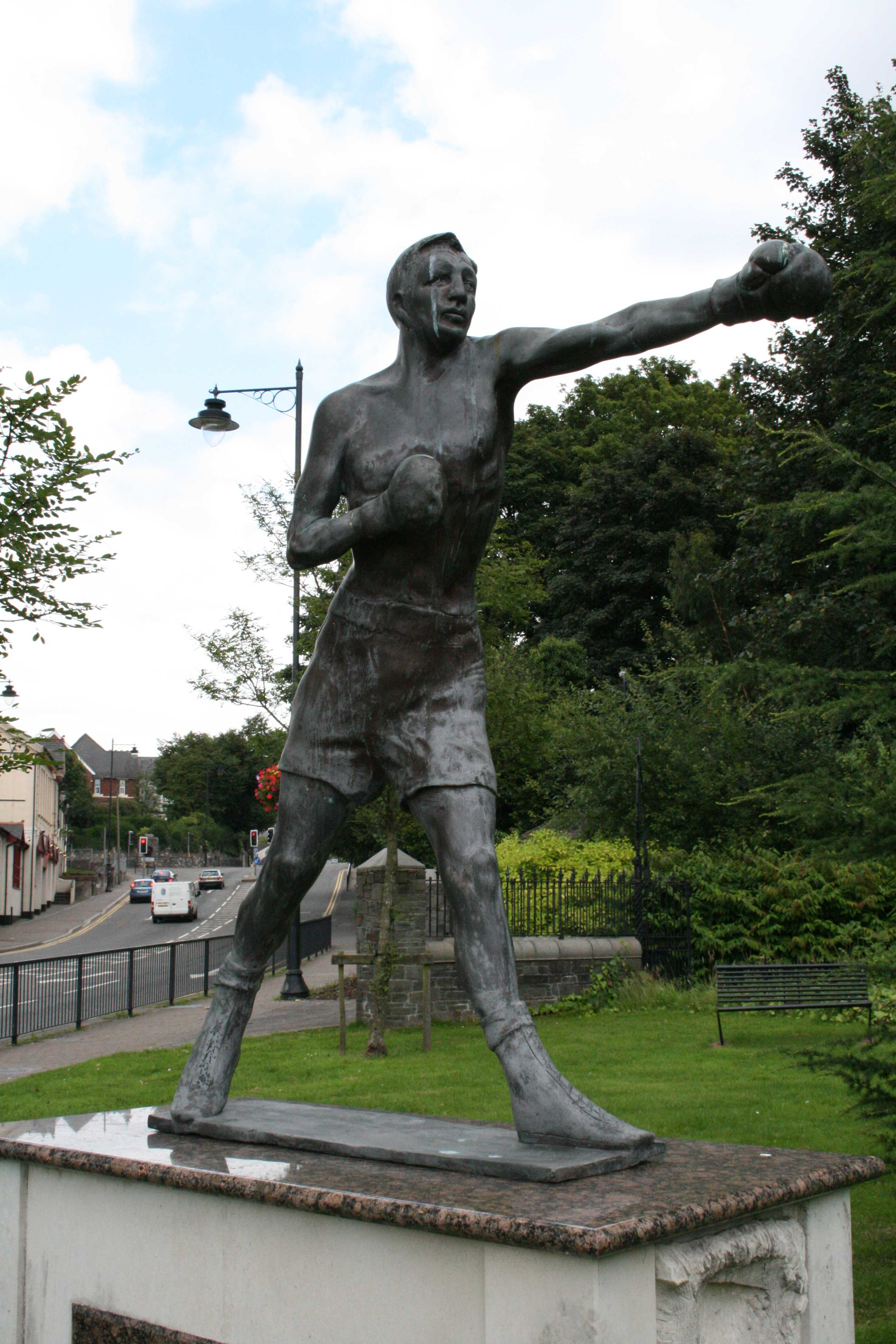
Sculpture of boxer Eddie Thomas in Bethesda Gardens

Merthyr is particularly known for its boxers, both amateur and professional. Famous professional pugilists from the town include: Johnny Owen, Howard Winstone and Eddie Thomas.

Football

In sporting terms, Merthyr is recognised for the town's football team, Merthyr Town. 'The Martyrs' currently compete in the Evostick Southern Football League and play home games at Penydarren Park. The club had their greatest success in 1987, when having won the Welsh Cup and qualified for the European Cup Winners Cup, they beat Italian football team Atalanta 2–1 at Penydarren Park.

The town was once home to a fully professional Football League club, Merthyr Town F.C., which folded in the 1930s and Merthyr Tydfil AFC were founded in 1945. The year of 2008 marked the centenary of football having been played at Penydarren Park (1908 – 2008). After going into liquidation in 2010, the club switched grounds to. Treharris Athletic Western F.C. play at the Athletic Ground in Treharris. The club play in the Welsh Football League Division Two.

Golf

Merthyr Tydfil Golf Club is situated on the southeastern slopes of Cefn Cil Sanws, a rough gritstone and limestone hill in the north-west of the County Borough. It is one of the highest golf courses in Britain. Morlais Castle Golf Club is situated adjacent to the ruins of Morlais Castle on Morlais Hill, approximately 2 km to the east and at about the same altitude.

Rugby union

Merthyr RFC, is known as 'the Ironmen'. Merthyr RFC was one of the twelve founding clubs of the Welsh Rugby Union in 1881. Bedlinog RFC, known as 'the Foxes' and Dowlais RFC were formed in the 1970s (though there were earlier versions of both).

Rugby league

Merthyr Tydfil is home to the Tydfil Wildcats Rugby League team who played at The Cage in Troedyrhiw until September 2010. For 2011 the club is hosted by Dowlais RFC. Merthyr Tydfil was one of the first rugby league sides formed in Wales in 1907 and notably beat the first touring Australian side in 1908.

== Education ==
Merthyr Tydfil College is the main further education provider in the area.

== Notable people ==
See Category:People from Merthyr Tydfil County Borough

Among those born in Merthyr Tydfil County Borough are:

- Gareth Abraham — professional footballer
- Laura Ashley — fashion designer and retailer
- Des Barry — author
- Mario Basini — journalist, broadcaster and author
- Barrie Bates — professional darts player
- William Berry, 1st Viscount Camrose — newspaper proprietor, and his brothers Seymour Berry (Baron Buckland) and Gomer Berry, 1st Viscount Kemsley
- Jamie Bevan — Welsh language activist
- The Blackout — post-hardcore band
- Kizzy Crawford — singer songwriter
- Nathan Craze — professional ice hockey goaltender
- Lloyd Daniels — singer; X Factor finalist
- David Davies — international footballer
- Ivor Davies — artist
- Richard Davies — actor
- Thomas Nathaniel Davies — artist
- Foreign Legion — street punk band
- Kevin Gall — professional footballer
- Sir Samuel Griffith — Australian politician
- Richard Harrington — actor
- John Hughes — businessman
- Robert Alwyn Hughes — artist
- Ciaran Jenkins — broadcaster and journalist
- Glyn Jones — poet
- Michael 'Micky' Jones (1942 – 10 March 2010) — guitarist, singer and songwriter with The Bystanders and Man
- John Edward Jones (governor) — American politician and the eighth Governor of Nevada
- William Ifor Jones — American conductor and organist
- Julien Macdonald — fashion designer
- Philip Madoc — actor
- Midasuno — alternative rock band
- Owen Money — comedian and singer
- Leslie Norris — poet
- Idloes Owen — singer, composer and conductor; founder of the Welsh National Opera
- Johnny Owen — boxer
- Jonny Owen — actor, broadcaster and producer
- Joseph Parry — composer
- Gustavius Payne — artist (painter)
- Mark Pembridge — Wales international football player
- Robert Sidoli — Welsh rugby international
- Rob Spragg – aka Larry Love – frontman (lead vocals) for Alabama 3
- Steve Speirs — actor
- Eddie Thomas — boxer
- Malcolm Vaughan — singer/actor
- Ian Watkins — musician and child sex offender
- Howard Winstone — boxer
- Gwyn A. Williams — historian and author
- Penry Williams — artist (painter)
- Trefor Jenkins - human geneticist and medical ethicist

Other notable residents include, and have included, poet, journalist and Welsh Nationalist Harri Webb, General Secretary of the PCS trade union Mark Serwotka, poet, author and Welsh language activist Meic Stephens, poet, author and journalist Grahame Davies. Sam Hughes began his career as a noted player of the ophicleide in the Cyfarthfa Brass Band. One of the first two Labour MPs to be elected to parliament was the Scot Keir Hardie, who was elected by the Merthyr Tydfil constituency. Notable descendants of Merthyr Tydfil include the singer-songwriter Katell Keineg, whose mother is a native of Merthyr Tydfil, also the "Chariots of Fire" athlete Harold Abrahams' mother Esther Isaacs and the grandfather of Rolf Harris both came from Merthyr Tydfil. The 1970s juvenile group The Osmonds are of Welsh descent and have traced their ancestry to Merthyr Tydfil. A number of artists and poets, including Cedric Morris, Heinz Koppel, Arthur Giardelli and Esther Grainger, were also drawn to Merthyr town and Dowlais during the 1940s, establishing the Merthyr Tydfil Educational settlement and the Dowlais Art Centre/Settlement.

== References in art and literature ==
- Rachel Trezise's 2007 book Dial 'M' for Merthyr (Parthian) follows Troed-y-rhiw rock band Midasuno on tour.
- Fierce Panda also released a compilation CD called Dial M for Merthyr in 1997 featuring Welsh rock bands including Manic Street Preachers, Catatonia, Stereophonics and 60 Ft. Dolls. Boxer Johnny Owen is pictured running over the hill tops on the cover.
- Horatio Clare's retelling of one of the Mabinogion tales, The Prince's Pen (Seren) refers to Merthyr Tydfil as being "declared an insurgent zone", and that people would refer to "'what happened at Merthyr' for years to follow".
- In the third episode of the 1978 BBC sitcom Going Straight Merthyr Tydfil is referred to as having, ".. more pubs.. than anywhere else in Britain, and they're all shut Sundays."
- In author Jasper Fforde's Thursday Next series (set in an alternate history), begun in 2001, Merthyr Tydfil is the capital of an independent People's Republic of Wales.
- Australian poet Les Murray references his experiences in the town in his poem "Vindaloo in Merthyr Tydfil".
- Canadian songwriter Jane Siberry uses "the slags of Merthyr Tydfil" as an image in her song "You Don't Need", from the 1984 album No Borders Here.
- Joseph Parry named a hymn tune "Merthyr Tydfil". It has the metre DLM (each stanza has eight lines of eight syllables each), and is sung to words such as "Tis finished, the Messiah dies".

== Twinnings ==
- Clichy, Hauts-de-Seine, France, Since 1980

== See also ==
- List of places in Merthyr Tydfil - a list of settlements
- Pont-y-Cafnau - the world's earliest surviving iron railway bridge
