= Aneurin Rees =

Wales international rugby union footballer

- Born: Theophilus Aneurin Rees; 9 April 1858 Llandovery, Wales
- Died: 11 September 1932 (aged 74) Merthyr Tydfil, Wales
- School: Llandovery College; Sherborne School
- University: Jesus College, Oxford
- Occupation: solicitor

Rugby union career
- Position: Forward
Amateur team(s)
Years	Team	Apps	(Points)
- South Wales Football Club
–	Llandovery College		
International career
Years	Team	Apps	(Points)
1881	Wales	1	(0)

Theophilus Aneurin Rees (9 April 1858 – 11 September 1932) was a Welsh rugby union forward who represented Llandovery College at club level. He was capped once for Wales, in the country's very first international rugby match.

== Personal history ==
Rees was born in Tonn, Llandovery, Carmarthenshire, Wales. He came from a distinguished family, his great uncle the Rev. Jenkin Rees was a Fellow of Wadham College, Oxford; while an uncle, Professor Rees of Lampeter College was a fellow of Jesus College, Oxford. His father was a published author, who wrote works on the literature of Wales. He was educated at Sherborne School and then Jesus College, Oxford, but did not win a "Blue".

In 1890 he was admitted as a solicitor, and by 1901 he was appointed clerk to the Merthyr Urban District Council. Four years later he was appointed as Town Clerk. A keen sportsman throughout his life, he was instrumental for the growth of golf in Merthyr, and was a central figure in the establishing of the Morlais Castle Golf Club and Cilsanws Golf Club at Cefn Coed. He died at his residence in Tonn Newydd, Merthyr Tydfil in 1932 and was buried in Cefn Coed Cemetery.

== Rugby career ==
Although best known for representing Wales in the very first rugby union international, Rees had played matches for the South Wales Football Club, which was the forerunner of the Welsh national team. Formed in September 1875, the S.W.F.C. was formed with the intention of not only playing local teams, but also to play '...the principal clubs in the West of England...' When the S.W.F.C. played Clifton at Cardiff in January 1876, Rees was on the team sheet, showing his willingness to be involved with a larger club that allowed him to face more established opposition.

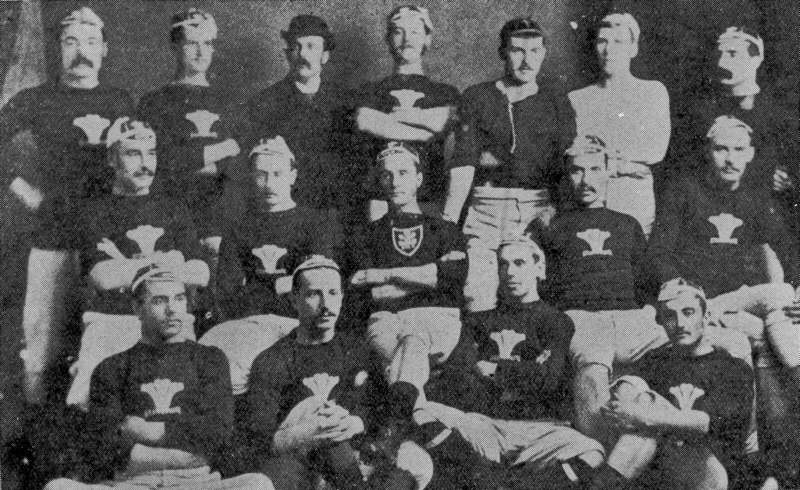
The first Welsh team, Rees is sat in the middle row, far left, February 1881

On 19 February 1881 Rees represented the Wales national rugby union team in the country's very first international rugby match, in a friendly against England. The match was a sporting disaster for the Welsh, with the players having little if any knowledge of playing together, and many of the team placed out of position. The English won by eight goals, scoring 13 tries in total, with Wales unable to score. The game was to be Rees' only cap for Wales, with most of the team replaced for the next Wales international in 1882. He was the first Jesus College alumnus to play for Wales.

On 12 March 1881, as a direct result of the actions set in motion by Wales' first rugby international, the Welsh Rugby Union was founded at the Castle Hotel in Neath. By September 1882, its officials were confirmed, and a decision was made to split Wales into two main rugby districts. With Bridgend at its centre, an Eastern and Western district were formed. The East was represented by Alex Duncan of Cardiff and W.R.U. secretary Richard Mullock. While the West was served by Ray Knill of Swansea and Aneurin Rees. As a member of the humiliated first Welsh team, Rees now found himself one of the first four national selectors, and was best served to ensure the farcical events of the 1881 international did not occur again.

=== International matches played ===
Wales (rugby union)

- England 1881

== Bibliography ==
- Smith, David; Williams, Gareth (1980). Fields of Praise: The Official History of The Welsh Rugby Union. Cardiff: University of Wales Press. ISBN 0-7083-0766-3.
- Watkins, David (2008). Sporting Highlights of Merthyr Tydfil. Merthyr Tydfil: TCC Books. ISBN 978-0-9539376-6-0.
