= Lis McLean =

Welsh politician

Lisbeth McLean MS
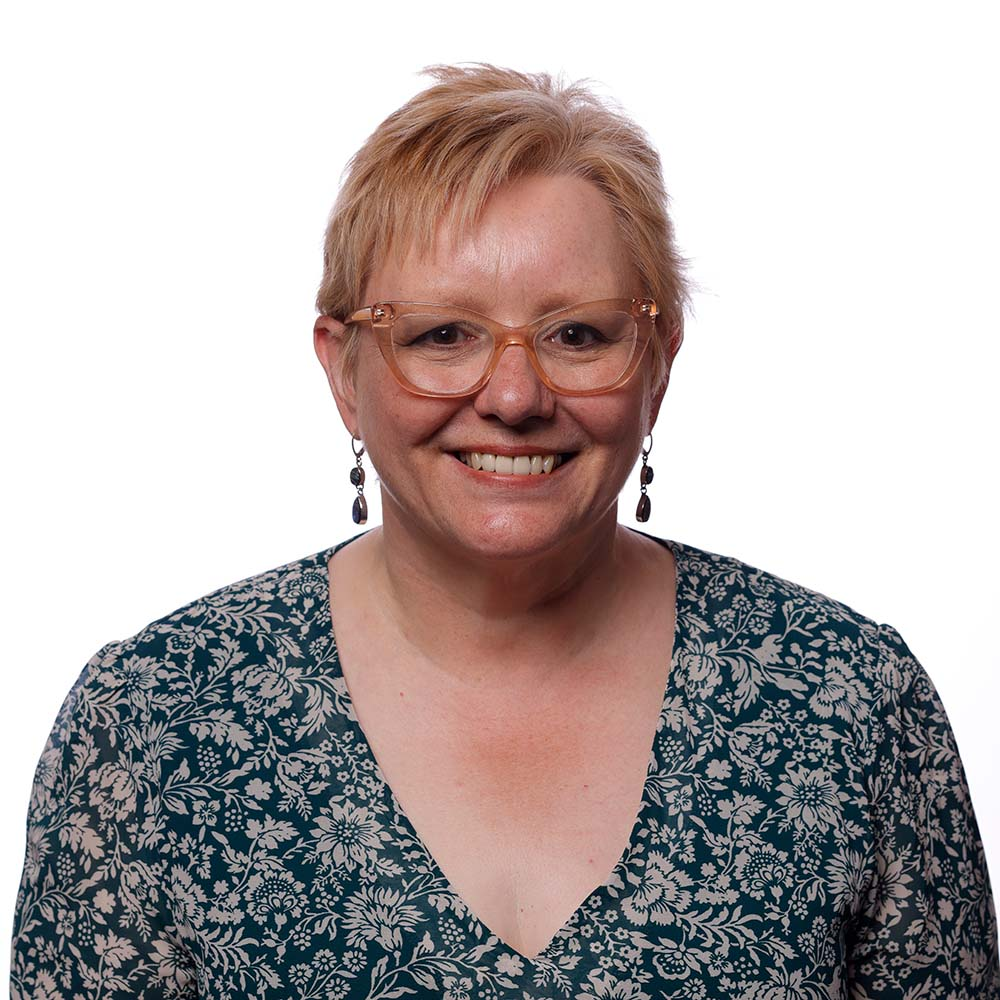
- Official portrait, 2026

Member of the Senedd for Pontypridd Cynon Merthyr
- Incumbent
- Assumed office 8 May 2026

Personal details
- Party: Plaid Cymru

Lisbeth Gay McLean is a Welsh politician from Plaid Cymru who has represented Pontypridd Cynon Merthyr since May 2026.

== Biography ==
McLean studied economics at the University of Aberdeen and Swansea University.

She was chief officer of Menter Iaith's Merthyr Tydfil branch. As part of these responsibilities, she also ran Canolfan Soar, a theatre and community venue owned by the organisation in Merthyr Tydfil.

She was elected in the 2026 Senedd election for the Pontypridd Cynon Merthyr constituency.
