= Harry Weinberger =

German painter

- Born: 7 May 1924; Berlin
- Died: 10 September 2009 (aged 85); Leamington Spa
- Occupation: Artist

Harry Weinberger (1924–2009) was an artist based in England. He was 'a trenchant defender of traditional painting', who fought against the dominant art school conventions of his day. Primarily a painter with a love of colour, Weinberger also taught art and illustrated books. He rarely painted people. Weinberger preferred to paint interiors and objects within them. He never dated his work (which has posed problems for curators, historians and those concerned with sales of his art). Harry Weinberger died at the age 85 on 10 September 2009.

== Biography ==
Harry Weinberger was born in Berlin on 7 April 1924, the son of a wealthy Jewish industrialist. When Hitler came to power in 1933, Weinberger's father moved the family from Germany to Czechoslovakia. Six years later on 20 July 1939, when Weinberger was 15, he and his sister Ina caught the last Kindertransport train to England, where he lived for the rest of his life.

As a boy growing up in Germany before the war, Weinberger witnessed several acts of political and racial violence, including the burning of the Reichstag and street brawls. Before the move to Czechoslovakia, Weinberger remembered watching boats of all kinds on the River Spree from the balcony of his parents' house at Bundesratufer 7 – a subject which he often returned to in his work, which for him symbolised escape.

Art was around him from an early age. The Weinbergers collected art, and a Russian artist, Grisha Oscheroff who lived with the family, taught Harry to paint at an early age. He never lost the obsession. He remembered seeing rich paintings in churches in Czechoslovakia, which fuelled his later passion for Russian icons.

Weinberger's cousin, the artist Heinz Koppel (1919–1980), who was four years older than Harry, also lived in Berlin, moved to Czechoslovakia in 1933 and came to Britain in 1938. Koppel's connections were to prove useful in Weinberger's early career. Weinberger's older brother and two of his uncles were also already resident in England by then.

On arriving in England, Weinberger initially boarded at schools in Northamptonshire and Buckinghamshire, then took a tool-making apprenticeship at a South Wales factory owned by one of his uncles, and studied engineering. During this time he also took private classes with the Welsh painter and print-maker, Ceri Richards (1903–1971).

Weinberger enlisted in the British Army towards the end of World War Two, and served in Italy. After a falling out with a commanding officer over his Jewish identity he endured a brief spell in a military prison in Hamburg, but was duly honourably discharged at the end of 1946.

After the war, Weinberger stated that he wanted to be able to paint in peace and quiet.

In 1951, Weinberger married Barbara Herrmann, an artist and later a social historian who had been his muse in Berlin. She was the daughter of the architectural historian Wolfgang Herrmann. They had one daughter, Joanna. Barbara died of cancer in 1996.

Weinberger lived in Leamington Spa from 1969 until his death aged 85 on 10 September 2009.

== Career ==
On his return to England, Weinberger was awarded an ex-serviceman's grant and moved to London to study under his previous tutor, Ceri Richards, at Chelsea College of Art. He did not do well at Chelsea; his modern colourful, expressive work was unpopular with staff and colleagues, who had taken on a rather more muted palette akin to the fashionable Euston Road School painters of daily life of the late thirties and early forties.

Once more, Weinberger looked for private tuition. He resisted studying under Oskar Kokoschka because he thought Kokoschka would try to mould his style too much, so in the end he decided to take lessons from the émigré German artist Martin Bloch (1883–1954), who he greatly admired, and who also taught his cousin Heinz Koppel. Bloch was an affirmed expressionist painter who encouraged his students to study in the National Gallery.

Weinberger left Chelsea College of Art to join Goldsmiths School of Art. In 1950 he went to Brighton to train as a teacher. Weinberger taught art at schools in London and Reading, then at a teacher training college in Manchester in the early 1960s and later became Head of Painting at Lanchester Polytechnic where he worked for nearly 20 years.

In the 1970s, Weinberger won a travelling fellowship from Goldsmiths School of Art to study icon paintings with the advice of the art dealer Richard Temple.

Weinberger retired from teaching in 1983 to focus on his studio career.

Weinberger had several rules for himself with regard to his work. He rarely painted people except for a few portraits and self-portraits. He preferred to paint interiors and objects within them, and he never dated his work (which has posed problems for curators, historians and those concerned with sales of his art). Weinberger said that he would prefer if the viewer focused on the work rather than the time it was made, he did not want comments about whether his style was fashionable or not.

The author of Weinberger's obituary in The Times wrote:

"Weinberger's painting had been inspired since the 1940s by his admiration for Matisse, Picasso and Van Gogh. He painted only what he could see, and in the 1950s made heavily impastoed and richly coloured landscapes and portraits. In the 1960s he began to apply his paint more thinly and in patchworks of even colour, but in a higher key, and with the subjects integrated into the background. From his retirement he lived only to paint, and he gradually turned the whole ... house into an image of his own work, in colour, furnishing and in the display of art and objects. ... His feeling for the pitch and weight of colour was unique, and became both more sure and more adventurous."

Apart from stories of his early years, Weinberger did not speak much about his Jewish background. He maintained his own interest in his own definition of spiritualism through the artefacts which he collected. He was obsessed with masks, particularly African masks and what he called 'magic art'.

Weinberger worked incessantly in his studio, well in to his eighties. His paintings are charged with energy and atmosphere. Evidently some were quite quickly worked. Weinberger illustrated several books during his life and filled endless sketch books mainly using pencil crayons, particularly while travelling, which he loved to do. He travelled widely in the UK and throughout Europe, capturing landscapes and harbour scenes in Wales, the Netherlands, Italy, Greece, Portugal and Turkey. His Italian landscapes and Amsterdam and New York port scenes are among his most admired works.

Though he lived in England for nearly 70 years, Weinberger never lost his German accent; it was part of who he was. He once said, "I paint with an accent, just as I talk with an accent."

== Influences ==
Weinberger cited Henri Matisse, Vincent van Gogh, Pablo Picasso, Paul Gauguin, James Ensor, Marc Chagall, Wassily Kandinsky, Rembrandt and Paul Cézanne as influences and indeed it is easy to see references to each of these artists in his work. In particular, Weinberger cited the influence of Matisse and Van Gogh. The influence of other German Expressionists such as Karl Schmidt-Rottluff, Emil Nolde and Ernst Ludwig Kirchner is also palpable in his work.

Weinberger's art-historian friends have commented on his passion for collecting Russian icons, a love for which he apparently developed at an early age. Amusingly, he would sometimes swap small groups of them for others he prized more highly. His personal art collection included Expressionist paintings, Russian icons, folk art, puppets, and primitive art from Indonesia, India, Africa and Tibet.

=== Iris Murdoch ===
Weinberger was a great friend of the writer Iris Murdoch over a 20-year period from 1977 until her death in 1999. They exchanged over 400 letters during this time. Murdoch was a great champion of Weinberger's work and he painted several portraits of her. They often visited galleries and exhibitions together.

In 2014, Weinberger's family gifted all of Iris Murdoch's letters to the Iris Murdoch Archive at Kingston University.

In an exhibition catalogue for a show of Weinberger's work at the Herbert Art Gallery Coventry in 1983, Murdoch wrote:

Harry Weinberger is a great painter whose genius is not well enough known. His works relate us to the deep emotions and profound joys of the early periods of the century when painting was a great universal exploration: impressionism, post-impressionism, fauvism, symbolism, expressionism, when painters adored paint and worshipped colour, inspired by passion and controlled imagination and courageous faith in their art.

== Legacy ==
In 2014, Weinberger's work was exhibited in Iris Murdoch & Harry Weinberger: Writer Meets Painter at the Kingston Museum & Art Gallery, London.

A symposium, Perspectives on the Paintings of Harry Weinberger, was held at Kingston University, London in September 2014.

== Work in public collections ==
- National Museum Wales

My House in Wales

- Government Art Collection

In Berlin (Bundesratufer)

- University of Sheffield

Novgorod 2
Red River Avanos 2

- Manchester Metropolitan University

Studio 1

- Leamington Spa Art Gallery & Museum

Black Snow
Inside/ Outside
In Cornwall
Still Life
Me Wearing Venetian Mask

- Herbert Art Gallery & Museum, Coventry

Window at Kenilworth, Warwickshire
Kenilworth, Warwickshire
Nude

- Ben Uri Gallery, London

In Winter, Manchester

== Selected exhibitions ==
- 1965: Harry Weinberger Herbert Art Gallery, Coventry
- 1971: Harry Weinberger, University of Sheffield
- 1973: Harry Weinberger, Kunstamt Neukölln, Rathaus-Galerie, Berlin (Part of the Berlin Festival, 1973)
- 1976: Roots and Influences: Jankel Adler, Hilde Goldschmidt, Harry Weinberger, Camden Arts Centre, London
- 1982: Atelier Europa, Karlsruhe, Germany (group show of work by fifteen European artists – Weinberger represented England)
- 1983: Harry Weinberger: Paintings and Drawings, Herbert Art Gallery, Coventry
- 1986: The Unbroken Line : 50 years of British drawing 1936–1986, Gillian Jason Gallery, London
- 1987: Harry Weinberger, Kunsthaus Schaller, Stuttgart
- 2004: Harry Weinberger: Retrospective, Royal Pump Rooms, Leamington Spa
- 2014: Iris Murdoch & Harry Weinberger: Writer Meets Painter Kingston Museum & Art Gallery

Weinberger's work was exhibited regularly at Duncan Campbell Contemporary Art in London. Campbell was Weinberger's primary agent in the UK from c. 1980. Weinberger held several one-man shows in Berlin and was invited to participate in many group shows in Germany.

== Artists Lives recordings ==
In 1995, Cathy Courtney interviewed Weinberger for the Artists Lives oral history series, part of National Life Stories, an independent organisation based within the British Library, resulting in ten hours of recordings. This is the best resource on Weinberger's life. There are also many points of interest regarding to art history, social history and the Second World War.
