= Robert Rees (singer) =

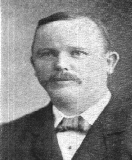

Background information
- Born: Robert Rees; 5 April 1841; Dowlais, Wales
- Died: 5 June 1892 (aged 51) Swansea, Wales

Robert Rees (5 April 1841 - 5 June 1892) was a Welsh tenor and musician. He was a successful competitor at eisteddfodau for which he adopted the pseudonym Eos Morlais, and in 1867 he won the main prize as a vocalist at the National Eisteddfod of Wales. He was recognised as one of the leading Welsh soloists of his time.

== Bibliography ==
Rees was born on 5 April 1841 in Dowlais, Merthyr Tydfil, the son of Hugh and Margaret Rees. His father died when he was eight years old and his mother died soon afterwards. At the age of nine he began working in a coal-mine, but due to showing a talent for singing and recitation, he was given lessons in music by an uncle.

As an adult Rees joined the Libanus Temperance choir and later became the choir's conductor. He took the pseudonym Eos Morlais, in reference to the River Moralis, which ran near his home during his childhood. He won several prizes at local eisteddfodau as a vocalist and in 1867, at the age of 26 years, he won the tenor competition at the National Eisteddfod at Carmarthen. In 1870, Rees moved to Swansea and became precentor at Soar Congregational chapel. He took a course of instruction at the Swansea Training College and was successful enough to give up work to devoted his whole time to music. Rees served for three years as precentor of Walter Road Congregational Church in Swansea and he conducted in singing festivals and served as adjudicator.

In 1874, at the National Eisteddfod, held in Bangor, Rees performed the song Hen Wlad Fy Nhadau and according to the Baner ac Amserau Cymru journal "had taken the Eisteddfod by storm". Hen Wlad Fy Nhadau was adopted as the Eisteddfod song in 1880 and sung at every Gorsedd ceremony since. In 1887 Rees was invited to sing at the National Eisteddfod in London in front of the Prince of Wales, Albert Edward. Rees led the singing of God Bless the Prince of Wales and at the end of the meeting he also sang Hen Wlad Fy Nhadau, to which the prince and his family rose, the first time royalty had stood to the Anthem of Wales.

Rees sang throughout Wales and England and in 1879 he performed a tour of North America. He died at his home in Swansea on 5 June 1892.
