= Pontypridd Cynon Merthyr =

Senedd constituency (from 2026)

- County multi-member constituency for the Senedd
- Boundary of Pontypridd Cynon Merthyr in Wales
- Principal areas: Merthyr Tydfil County Borough; Rhondda Cynon Taf
- Preserved county: Mid Glamorgan
- Population: 205,358 (2024)
- Major settlements: Abercynon, Aberdare, Llantrisant, Merthyr Tydfil, Mountain Ash, Pontypridd,

Current County multi-member constituency
- Created: 2026
- Seats: 6
- MS: Heledd Fychan, Jason O'Connell, Lis McLean, David Hughes, Sara Crowley, Vikki Howells
- Created from: UK Parliament boundaries: Merthyr Tydfil and Aberdare; Pontypridd; Previous Senedd constituencies: Brecon and Radnorshire; Cynon Valley; Merthyr Tydfil and Rhymney; Ogmore; Pontypridd; Previous Senedd region: Mid and West Wales; South Wales Central; South Wales East

Pontypridd Cynon Merthyr (Welsh for 'Pontypridd, Cynon, [and] Merthyr (Tydfil)';) is a six-member constituency of the Senedd (Welsh Parliament; Welsh: Senedd Cymru) used in the 2026 Senedd election. It covers areas in the south-east of Wales, particularly parts of Merthyr Tydfil and Rhondda Cynon Taf.

It was proposed following the 2026 review of Senedd constituencies, and was a pairing of the two UK Parliament constituencies of Merthyr Tydfil and Aberdare and Pontypridd. It has a Welsh-only name.

== Boundaries ==
A Senedd constituency comprising the boundaries of the UK Parliament constituencies of Merthyr Tydfil and Aberdare and Pontypridd, has been proposed by the Democracy and Boundary Commission Cymru for the 2026 election to the Senedd (Welsh Parliament; Senedd Cymru). It was initially proposed using the English name Merthyr Tydfil, Aberdare and Pontypridd in September 2024, but was renamed to Merthyr Cynon Taf in December proposals with most constituencies using Welsh-only names. It was then given the Welsh-only name Pontypridd Cynon Merthyr and its boundaries were confirmed in the commission's final recommendations in March 2025. When announcing their candidates, Reform UK used "Merthyr Tydfil and Aberdare, Pontypridd" instead, using the English names for the pair of UK Parliament constituencies that form it.

It encompasses parts of the principal areas (county boroughs) of Merthyr Tydfil County Borough and Rhondda Cynon Taf in South Wales. The constituency was established in 2026, following the passing of the Senedd Cymru (Members and Elections) Act 2024. The act legislates electoral reform of the Senedd to create 16 larger "super constituencies", pairing the 32 UK Parliament constituencies in Wales, and using a new fully proportional voting system, with each constituency electing six Members of the Senedd (MSs) rather than one previously.

== Members of the Senedd ==
Term	Election	Distribution	MS	MS	MS	MS	MS	MS
7th	2026	3 / 1 / 2	Heledd Fychan (PC)	Jason O'Connell (Ref)	Lis McLean (PC)	David Hughes (Ref)	Sara Crowley (PC)	Vikki Howells (Lab)

== Elections ==
=== Elections in the 2020s ===
2026 Senedd election: Pontypridd Cynon Merthyr
Party	Candidate	Votes	%	±%
Plaid Cymru	Heledd Fychan Lis McLean Sara Crowley Ian Gwynne Farrell Perks Ioan Bellin	28,687	39.3	
Reform	Jason O'Connell David Hughes Mark Lawrence Martin Roberts John Ball Jamie Loftus	22,217	30.5	
Labour	Vikki Howells Lloyd Watkins Chris Binding Mitch Theaker Mustapha Maohoub Anna Williams Price Jane Gebbie	9,344	12.8	
Conservative	Adam Robinson David William Jones Roxanne Rees Lee Davies Oliver Morgan Jayne McKenna	4,339	6.0	
Green	Angela Karadog James Bennett John Le Marchant Dane Georgina Budd Zara Siddique Jeff Baxter	3,466	4.8	
Independent	Beth Winter	2,297	3.2	
Liberal Democrats	Neil Feist David Seale Alec Dauncey Nick Beckett Chris Passmore Hayden Lewis	1,393	1.9	
Heritage	Julie Lloyd	431	0.6	
Gwlad	Stef Morgan	202	0.3	
Independent	Dai Williams	148	0.2	
Independent	Joseph Biddulph	104	0.1	
Majority				
Turnout		72847		
Registered electors				
win (new seat)				

2021 notional result (Note: Estimate of the 2021 Senedd election result as if the revised boundaries recommended under the 2026 boundary review were in place)
Party	Vote	%	Seats
Labour	32,067	52.5	4
Plaid Cymru	12,061	19.7	1
Conservative	9,681	15.8	1
Abolish	1,836	3.0	0
Independent	1,468	2.4	0
Liberal Democrats	1,386	2.3	0
Reform UK	1,040	1.7	0
Propel	816	1.3	0
Green	464	0.8	0
UKIP	304	0.5	0
