= Sara Crowley =

Welsh politician

Sara Crowley MS
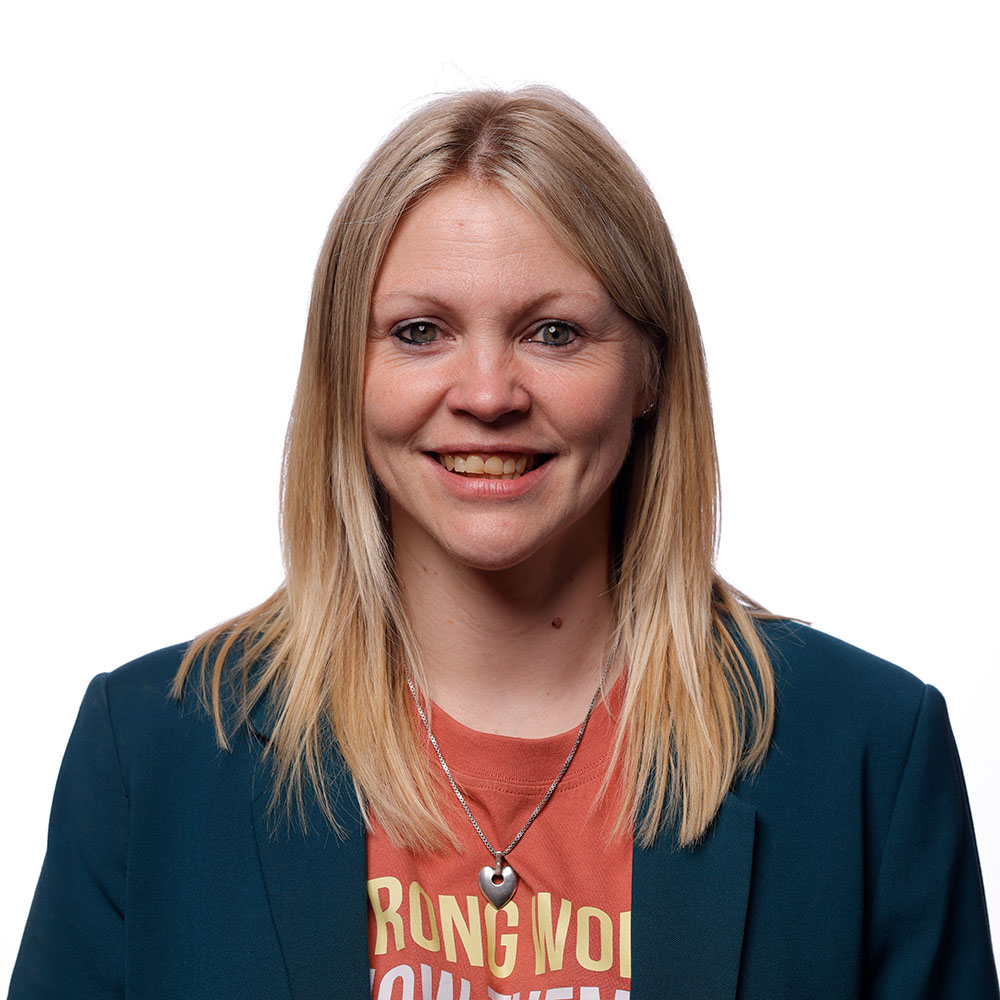
- Official portrait, 2026

Member of the Senedd
- Incumbent
- Assumed office 8 May 2026
- Constituency: Pontypridd Cynon Merthyr

Personal details
- Born: 30 October 1987 (age 38) Penrhiwceiber
- Party: Plaid Cymru
- Education: Trinity College Carmarthen

Sara Crowley (born 30 October 1987) is a Welsh Plaid Cymru politician who has served as a Member of the Senedd (MS) for Pontypridd Cynon Merthyr since May 2026.

== Biography ==
Crowley studied for a Teaching Degree at Trinity College Carmarthen. Prior to entering politics, Crowley worked as a teacher and in diabetes care.

== Political career ==
Crowley entered politics due to the Welsh government's Equal Power Equal Voice mentoring program, deciding to join Plaid Cymru when she was 36.

At the 2026 Senedd election, Crowley was elected as a MS for Pontypridd Cynon Merthyr constituency.

== Personal life ==
Crowley lives in the Cynon Valley with her partner Leanne and their twin children. She has type 1 diabetes, and temporarily lost her sight at the age of 26.
