= Sue Harvard =

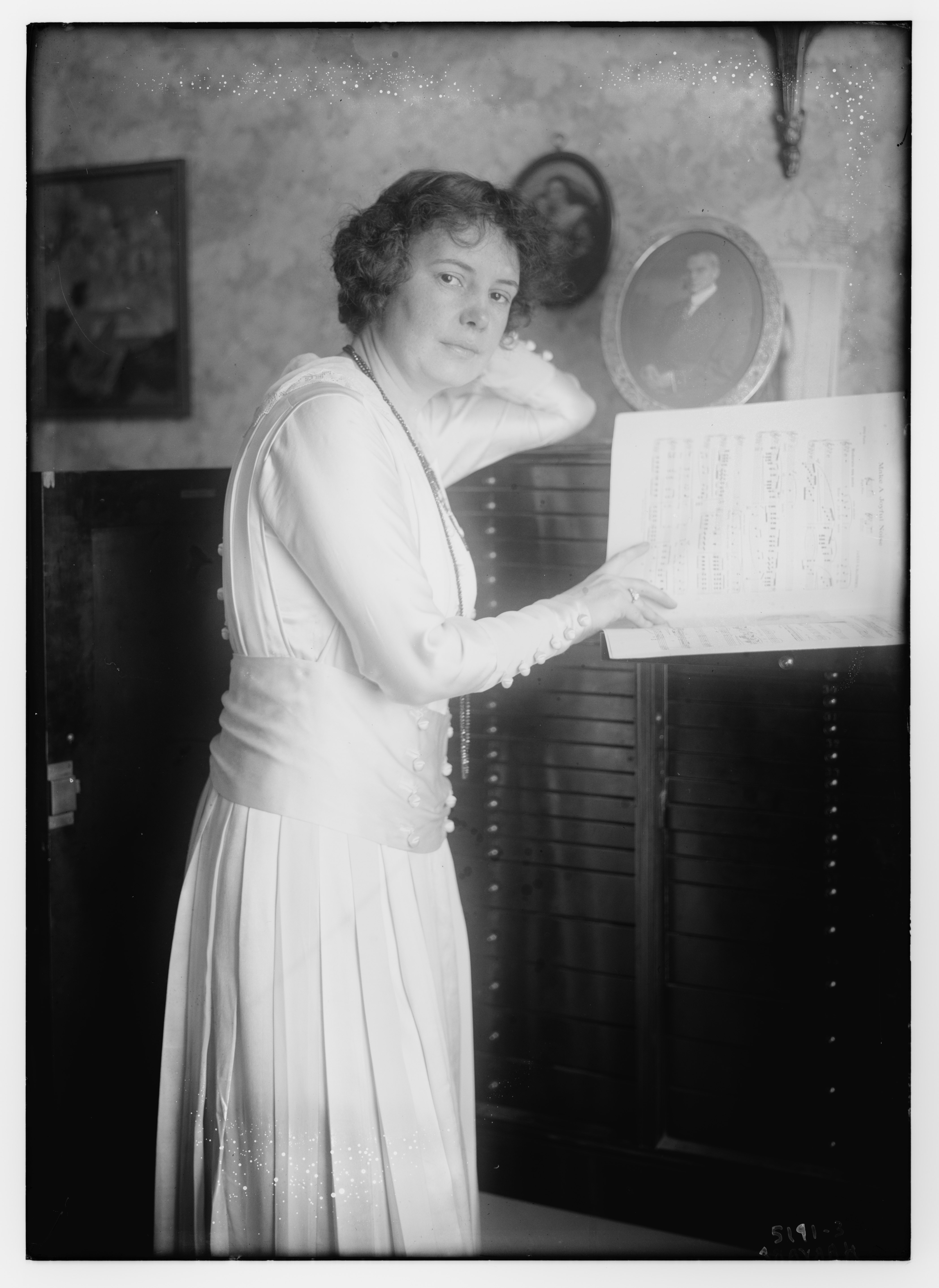

Background information
- Born: October 25, 1888; Dowlais, Wales
- Died: May 15, 1967 (aged 78) New York City, United States
- Genres: Opera
- Instrument: Voice (soprano)
- Spouse: Herbert Newton Armstrong

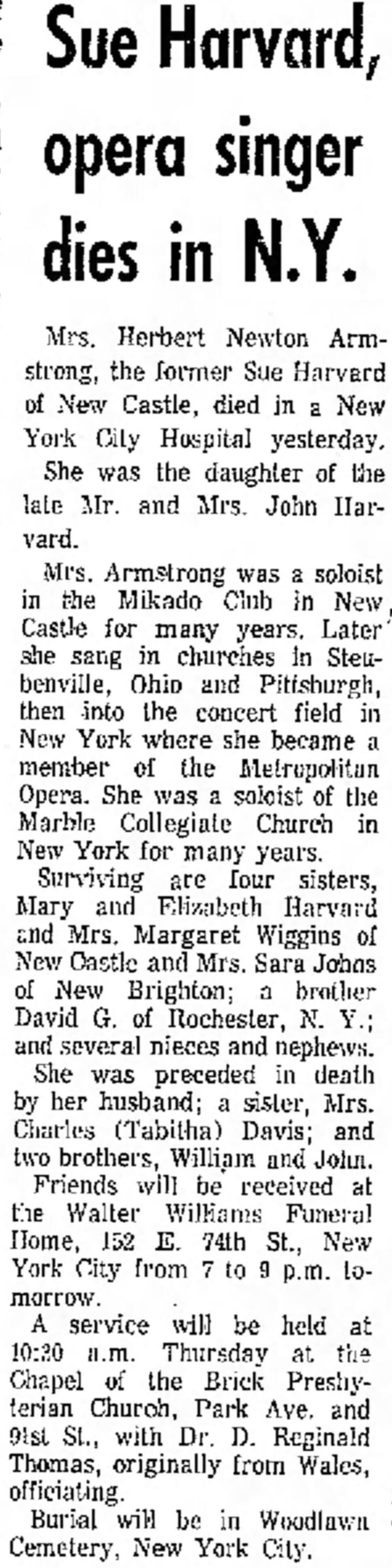
Death notice in the New Castle News (Pennsylvania)

Sue Harvard (October 25, 1888 – May 15, 1967) was a Welsh operatic soprano who performed in the United States.

== Biography ==
Harvard was born on October 25, 1888 in Dowlais, Merthyr Tydfil, Wales. She had five sisters and three brothers.

Harvard emigrated to the United States and studied in New York City and Pittsburgh. She had an operatic career spanning the 1910s and 1920s, employed by the Metropolitan Opera Company in New York and the Mikado Club in New Castle. In 1922, she was described by the New York Times as having a "voice of brilliant quality." She later performed in churches in Pittsburgh, Pennsylvania and Steubenville, Ohio.

She died on May 15, 1967 in New York City, New York, United States. She was buried at Woodlawn Cemetery (Bronx, New York).
