= Dowlais =

Village in Merthyr Tydfil County Borough, Wales

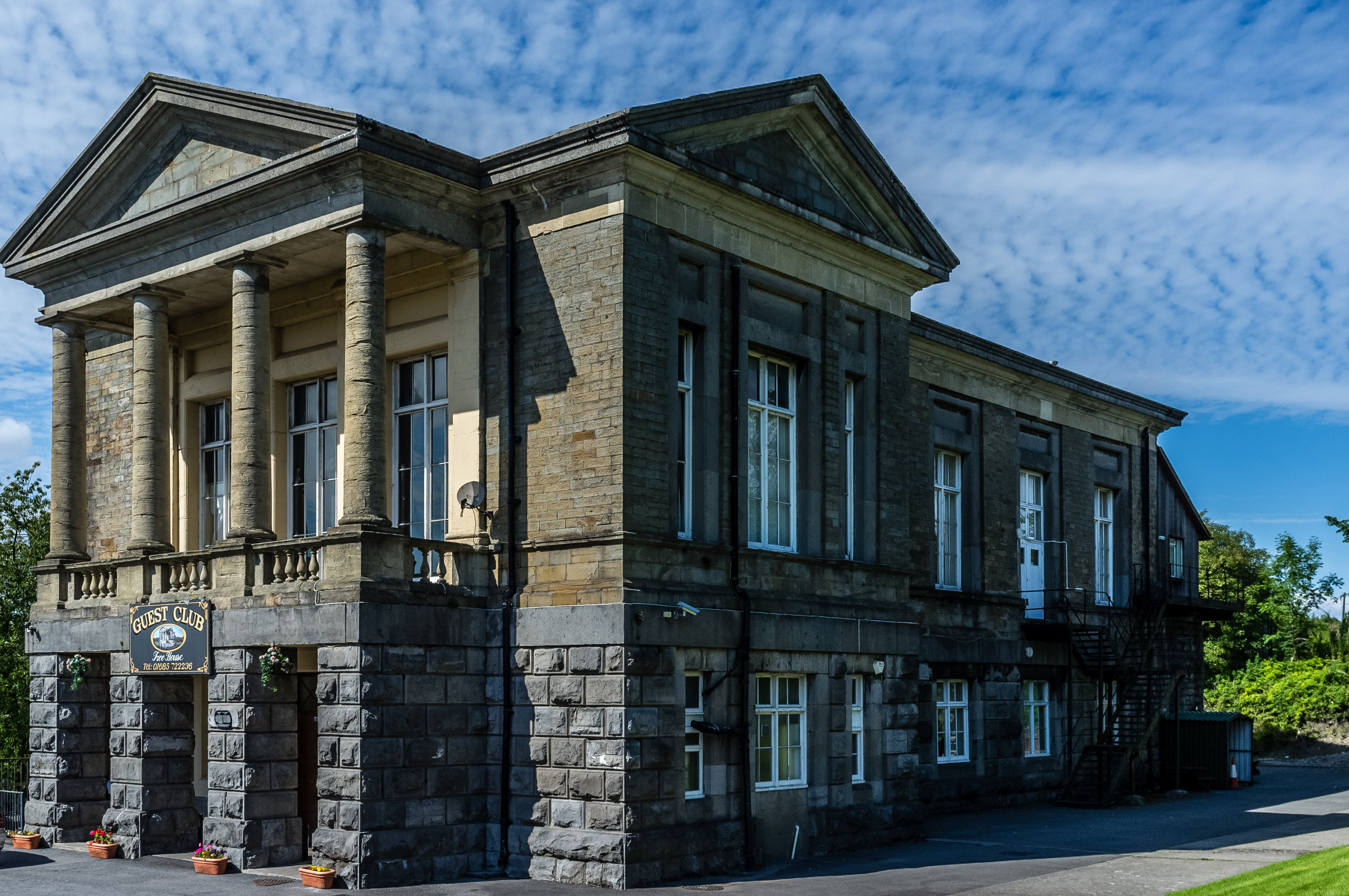
- The Guest Memorial Library

- Location within Merthyr Tydfil
- Population: 6,926 (2011 census)
- OS grid reference: SO075075
- Principal area: Merthyr Tydfil
- Preserved county: Mid Glamorgan
- Country: Wales
- Sovereign state: United Kingdom
- Post town: Merthyr Tydfil
- Postcode district: CF48
- Dialling code: 01685
- Police: South Wales
- Fire: South Wales
- Ambulance: Welsh
- UK Parliament: Merthyr Tydfil and Aberdare
- Senedd Cymru – Welsh Parliament: Merthyr Tydfil and Rhymney
- List of places UK Wales Merthyr Tydfil 51.762°N 3.353°W Map of the community

Dowlais (Welsh pronunciation: [ˈdɔu̯lai̯s]) is a village in the north-east of Merthyr Tydfil County Borough in South East Wales. The name is derived from the Welsh words du (= "black") and glais (= "stream"). Dowlais is notable within Wales and within Great Britain as a whole, for its historic association with ironworking; once employing, through the Dowlais Iron Company, over 7,000 people, the works being at one stage the largest in the world.

== Governance ==
Dowlais was originally part of the parish of Merthyr Tydfil. In 1872 its population was 15,590.

From 1973 to 1996 Dowlais was an electoral ward in Mid Glamorgan County Council. Since 1996 it has been a ward in the Merthyr Tydfil County Borough, which includes the two communities of Dowlais and Pantyscallog. At the 2011 census the ward had a population of 6,926. In 2003 Dowlais was represented by an independent councillor, John Pritchard, who was also Mayor of Merthyr Tydfil.

== History ==
Welsh historian Frederick Rees (1965) observed:

'In September, 1759, a partnership of nine persons, including some local names and that of Isaac Wilkinson, was formed with a capital of £4,000 to set up a furnace or furnaces near Merthyr on the banks of the stream called the Dowlais.'

The partnership took out a lease from Lady Windsor, the widow of Herbert, Lord Viscount Windsor. The terms of the lease were extremely favourable. They comprised a yearly rent of £31 and without any requirement to pay royalties on the iron and coal extracted from the site, which prompted Rees to comment that 'the prospects were considered very doubtful.' In 1767, the partnership offered John Guest from Broseley in Shropshire the post of manager of the works because of his knowledge of the Coalbrookdale method of smelting iron with coal. For some years, Guest didn't make much headway. But, by 1782, when he became a partner, the ironworks had become 'well established'. And, following the involvement of successive members of his family, the works became extremely successful.

By the mid-1840s there were between 5000 and 7000 men, women and children employed in the Dowlais works. During the early to mid 1800s the ironworks were operated by Sir John Josiah Guest and, from 1833, his wife Lady Charlotte Guest. Charlotte Guest introduced welfare schemes for the ironworkers. She provided for a church and a library. The school, which dates from 1819, was improved and extended, becoming "probably the most important and most progressive not only in the industrial history of South Wales, but of the whole of Britain".

In the 1850s, after Sir John's death, the works existed under the control of a board of trustees. In August 1856, two of the trustees, George Thomas Clark and Henry Austin Bruce, bought a license from Henry Bessemer and Robert Longsdon to use the Bessemer process to produce steel. However, it was not until 1865 that the process was used, with £33,000 being spent on a new steelworks. The process needed high grade iron ore which was unavailable in South Wales. However, it was abundant in northern Spain, in particular around the city of Bilbao. Consequently, in 1873 the company bought out the 'Orcenera Iron Ore Company' of Bilbao, which supplied it with iron. By 1900, more workers were needed for the ironworks. However, the recruitment of them was adversely affected by the occurrence of the Second Boer War for which, despite the widespread opposition to it (see Opposition to the Second Boer War), many young men enlisted. Consequently, the company recruited labourers from Ireland and twelve experienced metalworkers from the 'Altos Hornos' works in Bilbao, upon the understanding that they would repay the fare upon their arrival.

The Spanish workers were initially housed in the sheds of the ironworks and in local pubs, which E.P. Martin, the general manager of the Dowlais works (and the eldest son of George Martin, the longstanding mining engineer of the 'Dowlais Iron Company') remedied by ordering the construction of six bungalows in specially built 'Alfonso Street'. The work was completed in January 1901 and complemented by the construction of a second tranche of houses in the October. Academics Oscar Álvarez Gila and Stephen Murray observed: 'the building of the houses was particularly significant as it emphasized how valued the Basque workers were to Martin, particularly since there is no evidence of him doing the same for any of the other nationalities represented at the Dowlais Works.' More Spanish workers arrived in 1907, after which, by 1911, census reports documented 246 Spaniards living in and around the village. Welsh historian Jan Morris observed that the Spanish workers were 'militantly syndicalist' - they 'gave Welsh trade unionists all sorts of new ideas.' They 'were excellent Rugby players, and they became very popular: many Welshmen learnt Spanish from them'.

Following the involvement of successive members of his family, the ironworks became extremely successful. As Welsh historian John Lloyd (1906) observed: 'the Dowlais Works are known to all the world, ranking as one of the largest in the United Kingdom ....' Steel production at Dowlais eventually ceased in 1936 because of the Great Depression. However, the iron foundry continued until 1987.

== Notable buildings ==
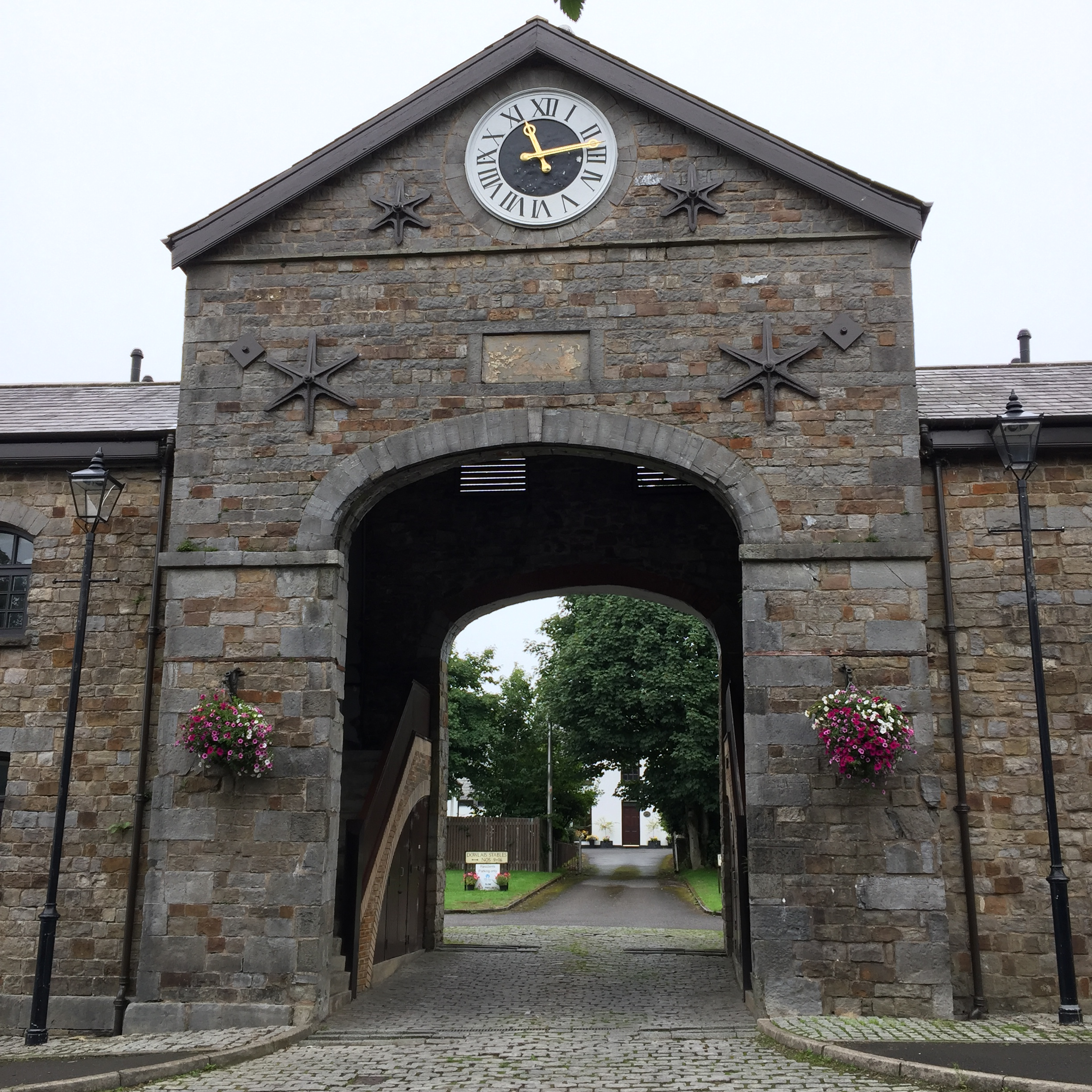
The old stables in 2018

Little remains of the works that once sustained the community throughout the Victorian era until the 1930s. The two notable buildings that remain are the engine house, which is now used as Dowlais Community Centre, and the stable block, which is now used for social housing.

Dowlais House, which was demolished, was once home to Sir John Josiah Guest and Lady Charlotte Guest. From 1838 it was where Lady Guest translated The Mabinogion, , which took her eight years to complete. The Guest Memorial Library, built (1855–63) as a memorial to Sir John, which was commissioned by Lady Guest and designed by Charles Barry, still stands.

St John's Church, a Grade II listed building, contains the tombs and burial places of several notable people, including Sir John Guest who had the church built in 1827. St John's closed in 1997, but has received several hundred thousand pounds of Welsh Government money to preserve it.

In its heyday, Dowlais had numerous nonconformist chapels. Almost all of them have disappeared, although the buildings of Bethania (Independent) and Hebron (Calvinistic Methodist) are now used by evangelical congregations. Other chapels have been demolished including Bryn Seion and Gwernllwyn.

== Sport and leisure ==
Dowlais is home to rugby union club, Dowlais RFC.

== Notable residents ==
- Laura Ashley, fashion designer
- Dai Astley, association footballer
- Richard Davies, actor
- Thomas Nathaniel Davies, artist
- David William Evans, lawyer and international rugby union player
- Horace Evans, 1st Baron Evans, royal physician
- Lady Charlotte Guest, first translator of the Mabinogion into English
- Ivor Guest, 1st Baron Wimborne, industrialist
- John Josiah Guest, engineer
- Richard Harrington, actor
- Sue Harvard, operatic soprano
- Robert Alwyn Hughes, artist
- Heinz Koppel, artist
- Gustavius Payne, artist
- Robert Rees, tenor
- Glanmor Williams, historian
- Gwyn Alf Williams, historian
