= Midasuno =

Welsh alternative rock band

- Also known as: Opium (1997–2000)
- Origin: Merthyr Tydfil, Wales, United Kingdom
- Genres: Emo
- Years active: 1997–2008, 2010 (Reunion show), 2015 (Final show)
- Label: Sugarshack
- Members: Scott Lee Andrews (Lead vocals, Guitar); Gavin Jessop(Bass); Chris Morgan (Guitars, vocals, synths, programming, samples, FX); Matthew Riste (Drums, Backing Vocals)
- Past members: Michael Cloke (Guitars); Steven Hopkins (Guitars, Keys); Lyndon Jones (Synths, FX, samples); Ryan Day (Guitar)

Midasuno were a Welsh four-piece emo band from South Wales. The band toured the United Kingdom and recorded three singles, an EP and three albums. The band are the subject of the road diary "Dial M For Merthyr" by the Welsh author Rachel Trezise.

Since splitting, Scott Andrews is now a member of Exit International while Chris Morgan formed Stay Voiceless after his subsequent band Accident Music split. Gavin Jessop & Matt Riste have been involved in other projects including the short lived All The Damn Vampires.

== History ==
=== Formation and debut ===
In 1997, School friends Scott Andrews (guitar/vocals), Gavin Jessop (bass), Matt Rise (drums), Mike Cloke (guitar), and Steven Hopkins (guitar) decided to form a band, originally known as Opium. They began rehearsing in Rise's home garage, which they had sound-proofed using egg boxes.

Their first live performance was eighteen months later at a house show for a friend's birthday party. Soon mutual friends began booking them to perform at pubs.

Disliking the presence of three guitarists, they band decided to part ways with Cloke. This responsibility of this was put upon Rise, who informed Cloke at the beginning of 1999. However, Rise was left embittered by the process, and too departed from the band. Opium was inactive until Boxing Day of the same year, when Andrews called Rise, playing him a new song he'd played called "The Art of Fear", leading to Rise rejoining the band. Soon, they recorded "The Art of Fear" as their debut single with Stu Richardson.

They changed their name Midasuno as a portmanteau of a song title by Rush that Andrews liked and a character from a video game that Rise liked. Their first show under this name was at Treharris Boys’ Club In September 2001, the band performed at Manchester music conference In the City. There, they were approached by James McLaren, a journalist, who was planning to open a record label, asking Midasuno to be their first release. "The Art of Fear" was released in 2002, on McLaren's label Cascade Records.

At the beginning of 2002, they were approached by Community Music Wales to support Lostprophets for a series of performances at the Blackwood Miners Institute. In November, they were nominated for the category of "Best New Unsigned Band" at the Welsh Music Awards, against Funeral for a Friend and the Kennedy Soundtrack. They won the award, presented to them by Gary Beadle.

=== When Bulls Play God ===
Signed to Worcester's Lockjaw Records by the end of 2002, the band then recorded the mini-album "When Bulls Play God" at Waiting Room Studios, Mid Wales. The album was recorded in under two weeks and a relentless UK tour schedule was then booked to promote the release. The album was a month late coming out, and received rave reviews from the rock press including Rocksound, Metal Hammer, and Kerrang! magazine.

The band set out on tours with bands such as Hondo Maclean, Monkey Boy and Colour of Fire. Due to unknown reasons, the relationship between the label and the band deteriorated, and soon saw both the departure of the band from the label, and of Steven from the band. He was replaced by Christopher Morgan, guitarist of local band The UCA Chapter, who was a friend of Scott and Matt and fan of the band. The band then set off on a headlining UK tour just days after the completed line-up. It was on this tour that it was decided to enrol long term friend Lyndon Jones into the band to trigger samples and play synthesiser to thicken out the band's sound.

=== Til Death Do Us Party ===
After touring relentlessly the band then took some time out to write and record their debut album with producer Nick Loyd who had previously engineered some demo material for the band at Strongbox Studio in Penarth. Several songs were written in these sessions including A Machine; the rhythm thief, and other working titles such as Body like Christmas-head like Halloween, and the recording process was covered heavily by Rocksound Magazine.

Due to technical difficulties and personal strains the album took longer to materialise, initially titled The curse of Midasuno, the band decided to release the best of the tracks from the sessions as a mini-album "Til Death Do Us Party" which the band released in 2006 after signing a deal with Bristol-based label Sugar Shack Records. The band then returned to the road where they carved their niche in the British rock scene.

The band announced they will play one final show with the original line up at Cardiff's Millennium music hall on 4 December 2010, before closing the door on Midasuno forever.

== Musical style and influences ==
Critics categorised Midasuno's music as emo.

The band cite influences including Refused, particularly their album The Shape Of Punk To Come (1998), Quicksand, Fugazi, At the Drive-In, Muse, Guns N' Roses, King Adora, My Chemical Romance and Lostprophets.

== Discography ==
- "The Art of Fear" (2002) (single)

1. "Art of Fear"
2. "Lacerate" / "Break"

- When Bulls Play God (2003) (studio album)

1. Start a riot
2. Samuel L.
3. Cut Ribbons
4. Face Down
5. Tear
6. Hypocrite

- Til Death Do Us Party (2006) (studio album)

1. A Machine; The Rhythm Thief
2. The Law Of Tooth And Fang
3. Taste the Virus
4. Shock, Horror
5. Sirens

- "Don't Drive (Faster than Your Angel Can Fly)" (2007) (single)
- Songs in the key of F**k (2007) (studio album)

1. Sister Temptation
2. Don't Drive (Faster than your angel can fly)
3. Decent Assault
4. A Machine; The Rhythm Thief
5. 1997
6. The law of tooth and fang
7. Reactions
8. Sirens
9. The Continental Length
10. Sleepwalkers

- "Sister Temptation" (2008) (single)

1. Sister Temptation
2. Taste The Virus (Live @ BBC)
3. Reactions (Live @ BBC)

- Unreleased / Rare

1. Standstill
2. Bring Me The Heads
3. Come2Blows
