= Thomas Nathaniel Davies =

Welsh artist and teacher

Thomas Nathaniel Davies (1922-1996)

Thomas Nathaniel Davies (1922–1996) was a Welsh artist and teacher, born in Dowlais, Merthyr Tydfil, Wales. Shunning a promising early career with Cardiff City Football Club, he enrolled at Cardiff College of Art in 1939, where he was taught and befriended by the painter Ceri Richards.

His studies were interrupted by the Second World War and he was called up for service with the Royal Corps of Signals in North Africa. On his return he taught for a brief period at the Royal College of Art where the sculptor John Skeaping, a professor there, became a close friend. In 1945 he accepted a job at Newton Abbot Art School, before later becoming the Head of Art at South Devon College, Torquay.

During this post-War period he produced paintings that reflected both his childhood in the grey iron town of Dowlais and the green landscape of his new life in Devon. It also marked an intense time of portrait painting, with influences ranging from Post-Impressionism to Picasso. In 1957 a portrait of his was included as one of the 'Young Artists of Promise' in Jack Beddington's book. His self-portraits from this period also form a small but masterly body of his work, in which the artist is searching out his real identity as an individual and as a painter in the aftermath of the War.

The 1950s saw a new confidence in Davies' work with the artist's style moving away from representational views; during the 1960s, he took an even bolder step towards abstraction. The boats in the harbour became fragmented, for example, and his portraits were pared down into simple geometric forms. In the early 1970s he produced large, clean, sparse paintings eschewing figuration entirely but, as always in his work, powerful definition of line was preeminent. Indeed, at this time he produced a series of spot paintings and sculptures - some twenty years before Damien Hirst would think of his designs. This led him to begin to work more out of coloured perspex and wood.

Davies retired as Head of South Devon College's school of Art in 1984. With less inclination to produce big paintings, he concentrated on woodcuts in his Newton Abbot studio. Davies died in 1996. .
