= Menter Iaith =

Menter Iaith (plural: Mentrau Iaith, English: Language Initiative) is a community-based organisation which works to raise the profile of the Welsh language in a specific area. Each local Menter Iaith receives a basic grant from the Welsh Language Board, as well as financial support from a number of other sources, to work with individuals, organisations, and local business to promote the use of Welsh in its area.

The first Menter Iaith to be established was Menter Cwm Gwendraeth in 1991. Normally a Menter Iaith will operate in an area defined by the local authorities of Wales, with the exception of Carmarthenshire and Powys, which each have a number of smaller Mentrau Iaith operating on a local level. In total, there are 24 organisations in existence. In 2008, a Menter Iaith was established in Patagonia, in association with the Urdd, British Council Wales, and support from private businesses.

== Mentrau Iaith Cymru ==
Mentrau Iaith Cymru is an umbrella organisation which provides a platform for the Mentrau to share information and ideas.

== List of Mentrau Iaith ==
- CERED (Menter Iaith Ceredigion) - (Ceredigion)
- Menter Abertawe - (Swansea)
- Menter Caerdydd - (Cardiff)
- Menter Iaith Blaenau Gwent, Torfaen, a Mynwy - (Blaenau Gwent, Monmouthshire and Torfaen)
- Menter Iaith Bro Dinefwr - (Dinefwr, Carmarthenshire)
- Menter Iaith Bro Morgannwg - (Vale of Glamorgan)
- Menter Iaith Bro Ogwr - (Bridgend)
- Menter Iaith Brycheiniog - (Brycheiniog, south Powys)
- Menter Iaith Castell-nedd Port Talbot - (Neath Port Talbot)
- Menter Iaith Conwy - (Conwy)
- Menter Iaith Cwm Gwendraeth - (Gwendraeth Valley, Carmarthenshire)
- Menter Iaith Dinbych - (Denbighshire)
- Menter Iaith Gorllewin Sir Gar - (West Carmarthenshire)
- Mentrau Iaith Hunaniaith - (Gwynedd
- Menter Iaith Llanelli - (Llanelli, Carmarthenshire)
- Menter Iaith Maelor - (Wrexham)
- Menter Iaith Maldwyn - (Maldwyn, north Powys)
- Menter Iaith Merthyr - (Merthyr Tydfil)
- Menter Iaith Môn - (Isle of Anglesey)
- Menter Iaith Rhondda Cynon Taf - (Rhondda Cynon Taff)
- Menter Iaith Sir Benfro - (Pembrokeshire)
- Menter Iaith Sir Caerffili - (Caerphilly)
- Menter Iaith Sir y Fflint - (Flintshire)
- Menter Iaith Casnewydd - (Newport)
