= Heinz Koppel =

German-born British painter

Heinz Koppel (29 January 1919, Berlin - 1 December 1980, Cwmerfyn, Wales) was a British artist of German origin, who spent much of his life working in Wales.

== Life ==
Koppel was born to Jewish parents in Berlin, where he grew up, but after the Nazi takeover of Germany, they emigrated to Prague, Czechoslovakia in 1933, where he began his education as an artist. In 1938, he and his father Joachim fled to the United Kingdom. His mother, Paula, was plagued by severe arthritis attacks and remained in Czechoslovakia. During the Holocaust, she was deported to Theresienstadt and was eventually murdered in the Treblinka extermination camp.

Joachim worked in a factory in Pontypridd, whilst Heinz studied art in London, with the German emigre artist, Martin Bloch, who was to be a great influence on Koppel's later work. Bloch also taught Koppel's cousin, the artist Harry Weinberger, who had fled to England from Czechoslovakia a year after Koppel. In addition, Koppel became interested in Freudian psychoanalysis, which is reflected in his work. Other influences included German Expressionism and Surrealism.

From 1944 onwards, Koppel lived in Dowlais, near Merthyr Tydfil, Wales, where he taught art to both children and adults, and the surrounding countryside was an important subject in his paintings, showing mystical influences and often bordering on the fantastic. The decaying industrial areas of Wales were also present in his work, whilst his murdered mother is a motif in a series of papers.

In early 1949 he married fellow artist Renate Fischl a German exile born in Dresden, herself a painter of some repute and student of the East Anglian School of Painting and Drawing.

In 1956, Koppel left Wales with his wife and children and for a time, he lived in London and Liverpool, where he continued to work as an art teacher and it was during this time that his work began to be regularly exhibited in London galleries. Finally, in 1974, he settled down in Cwmerfyn, near Aberystwyth, remaining active as an artist, and in his later work he experimented with various materials such as fibreglass and resin.

He was one of the original members of the 56 Group Wales, which set out to raise the profile of modern Welsh art.

Koppel's son Gideon Koppel is a film maker and a Professor of Media at Manchester School of Art.

Koppel died suddenly on 1 December 1980, at the age of 61.

== Works ==
Many of Koppel's works are in museums and galleries in South Wales. In his homeland, however, he is largely unknown. The first exhibition of his works in Germany was held in Berlin between August 2009 and January 2010 at the Centrum Judaicum.
