= Merthyr Tydfil (Cilsanws) Golf Club =

Mountain Ash Golf Club
- Mountain Ash Golf Club within Wales
- 51.69699°N 3.397586°W

Club information
- Location: Rhondda Cynon Taf, Wales
- Established: 1908
- Type: Golf Club
- Tota holes: 18
- Website: mountainashgc.co.uk
- Length: 5345 yards

Merthyr Tydfil Golf Club (also known as Cilsanws Golf Course; Welsh: Clwb Golff Merthyr Tydfil (Cilsanws)) is a golf club based just outside Merthyr Tydfil at Merthyr Tydfil County Borough, Wales. Also known by the name "Cilsanws", this is an 18-hole mountain course. Their "Pay and Play" course is available to non-members.

== Notes ==
Official Site mtgc.co.uk
