= Jenner Medal of the Royal Society of Medicine =

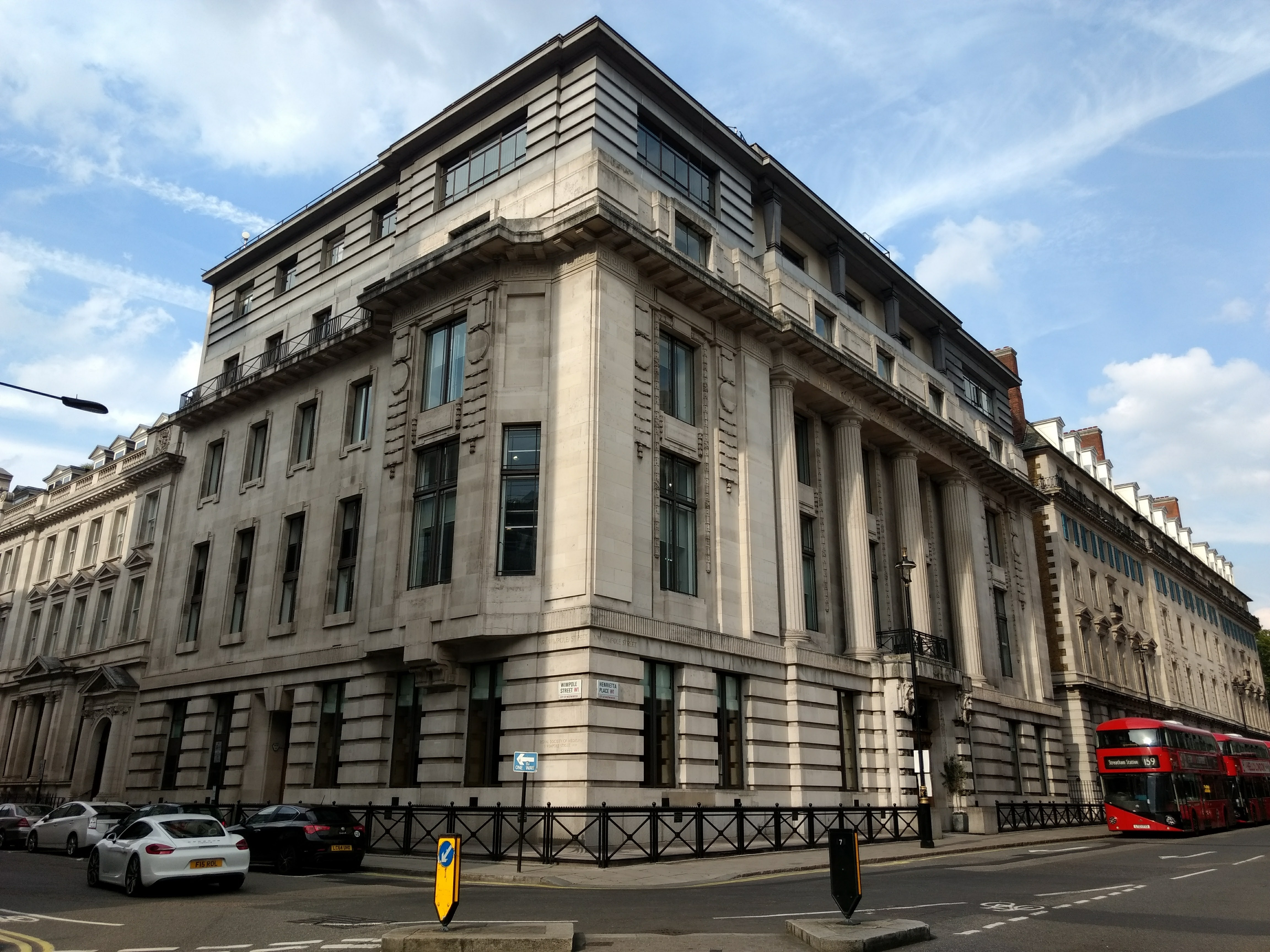
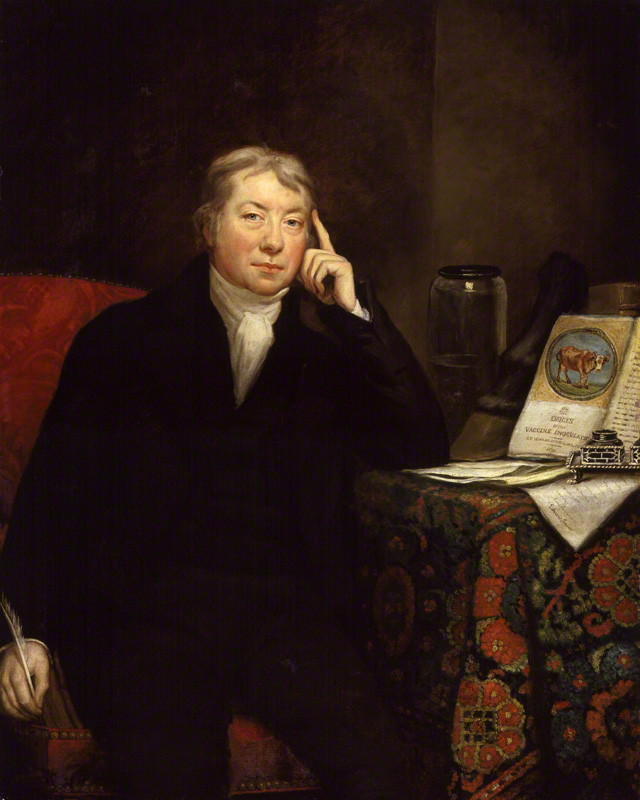
- Royal Society of Medicine (top) and Edward Jenner by James Northcote (below)
- Awarded for: Contributions to epidemiology and public health
- Date: 1896
- Location: London
- Country: United Kingdom
- Presented by: Royal Society of Medicine at the recommendation of the Epidemiology and Public Health Section
- Hosted by: Royal Society of Medicine, London
- Formerly called: Jenner Memorial Medal of the Epidemiological Society of London
- Motto: Venienti Occurrite Morbo

Highlights
- First recipient: Sir William Henry Power (1898)
- Other anniversaries: Leonard Colebrook (1962 centenary of Sydney Copeman's birth)
- Last known recipient: Sir Michael G. Marmot (2010)

The Jenner Medal of the Royal Society of Medicine, formerly known as the Jenner Memorial Medal or the Jenner Medal of the Epidemiological Society of London, is awarded from time to time by the Royal Society of Medicine (RSM), London, at the recommendation of its Epidemiology and Public Health Section, to individuals who have undertaken distinguished work in epidemiological research or made significant contributions in preventing and controlling epidemic disease. It is named in honour of Edward Jenner's discovery of a means of smallpox vaccination. The first Medal was awarded in 1898, presented by Sir Patrick Manson to Sir William Henry Power, the then Medical Officer of Health for London.

The Medal was designed in bronze by Allan Wyon. The date of the award and recipient's name is engraved on the rim. A three-quarter face of Jenner is engraved on the obverse, and on the reverse is depicted a globe. The original by-laws, published in 1898, stated that the medal should commonly be called the "Jenner Medal", the awardee not be confined to only the British, and that the Epidemiological Society Council would determine when and who receives it. The regulations were revised in 1951, with the recommendation that the Medal be awarded not more frequently than once in five years.

== Foundation ==
The Jenner Medal was founded on 15 May 1896 at a meeting of the Epidemiological Society of London (1850–1907), during the presidency of Sir Shirley Murphy, to commemorate the centenary of Edward Jenner's discovery of a means of smallpox vaccination. (Note: Several medals were produced to commemorate Jenner's smallpox vaccine.)

The founding committee was made up of Murphy, Sir Richard Thorne Thorne, Theodore Preston, Frank Clemow, R. D. Sweeting, Bulstrode and Coupland. Appeals for funds were made through medical journals. Subscribers included the Epidemiological Society, Thorne, Murphy, John C. McVail, Thomas H. Wakley, Sir James Donnet, Sir William Broadbent, Robert Barnes, Andrew Davidson, Sir Edwin Saunders, Philip Pye-Smith, Joseph Frank Payne, Sir John Simon, and Sir James Paget. From outside the UK, subscribers included Kalman Muller from Budapest, Prospero Sonsino from Pisa, Rudolph H. Saltet from Amsterdam, and Joseph D. Tholozan from Teheran.

== Design ==
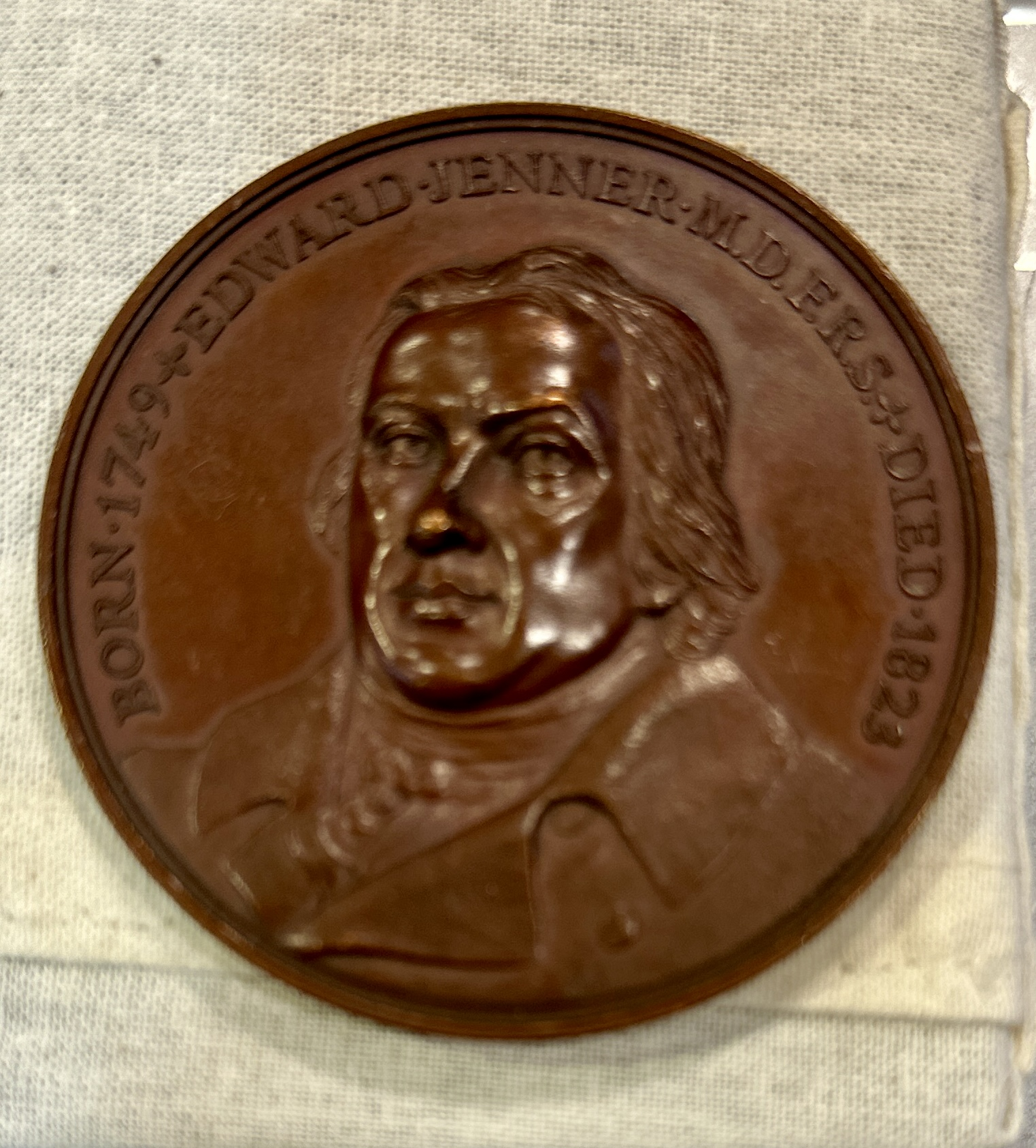
Jenner Meda (obverse)l

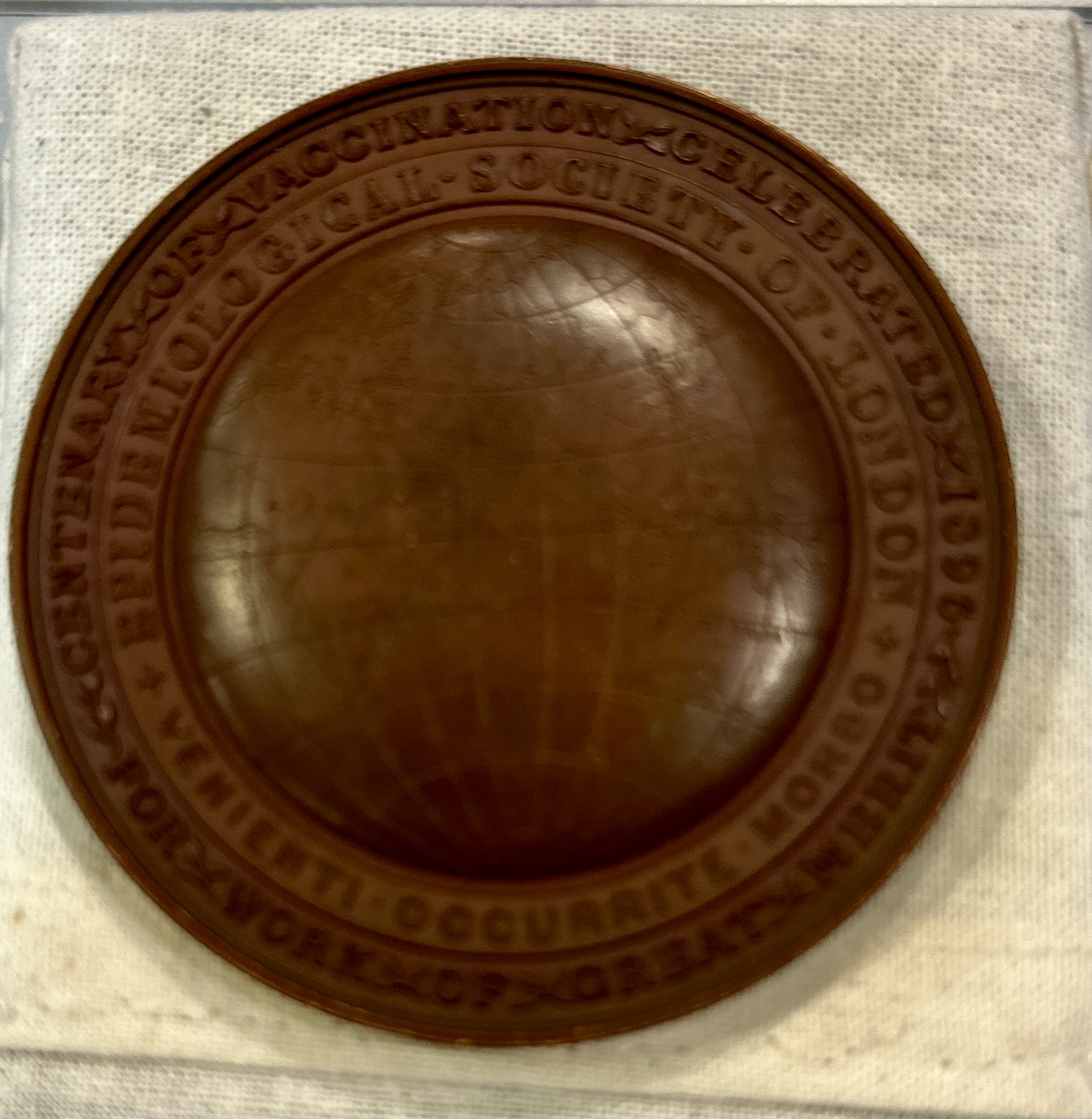
Jenner Medal (reverse)

The medal, a coin, was designed in bronze by Allan Wyon. The date of the award and recipient's name is engraved on the rim. A three-quarter face of Jenner is engraved on the obverse, and accompanied are the words:

Edward Jenner, M.D., F.R.S, born 1749, died 1823

The symbol of the Epidemiological Society, the Earth, is depicted on the reverse. Around the circumference are the words:

Centenary of Vaccination Celebrated 1896. For Work of Great Merit. Epidemiological Society of London. Venienti Occurrite Morbo

== Regulations ==
The by-laws, published in 1898, stated that the medal should commonly be called the "Jenner Medal", the awardee not be confined to only the British, and that the Epidemiological Society Council, via its Jenner Medal sub-committee consisting of its president, treasurer and honorary secretaries, would determine when and who receives it.

The medal was re-cast by Wyon following the merger of the Epidemiological Society with the Royal Medical and Chirurgical Society of London in 1907, when it became the Section of Epidemiology and State Medicine of the RSM. (Note: Photographs of the medal can be found in Penelope Hunting's The History of the Royal Society of Medicine published in 2002.) The new Epidemiological Section then made their recommendation to the RSM Council, who were to bestow the Medal.

In 1951, a sub-committee was established to revise the by-laws, following the eleventh award to Glover. The Jenner Medal sub-committee consisted of Robert Cruickshank, then the Section president, W. Charles Cockburn and Ian Taylor, the two honorary secretaries, and Glover. After considering the notability of the former awardees, they recommended that the Medal be awarded not more frequently than once in five years, and that it be a standing item on the agenda of the Section Council meeting preceding their annual meeting each year. (Note: The subsequent two Medals were awarded with an interval less than five years apart.) Awarding it too often was seen to diminish its value, and that it had not generally been awarded regularly highlighted that the Section Council were not always aware of its details.

== Awards ==
The purpose of the award is to reward an individual for significant work in epidemiology or contributions in preventing and controlling epidemic disease. The Medal was first awarded on 24 June 1898 to Sir William Henry Power, who was the then Medical Officer of Health for London, and had chaired the Royal Commission on Tuberculosis. It was subsequently awarded to Charles Louis Alphonse Laveran, for discovering the malaria parasite, and then Sir Patrick Manson, for showing that it was carried by a mosquito.

In 1923, the Medal featured at a RSM event to commemorate the centenary of Jenner's death. There, delegates passed anti-vaccinationists before entering the building. When James Alison Glover won the eleventh Medal in 1951, he mentioned that he had been acquainted with seven of the previous ten recipients. The 1962 award to Leonard Colebrook was timed with the centenary of the birth of Sidney Monckton Copeman, who had won it himself 37 years earlier. Donald Henderson received the Medal in 1996, the year of the Jenner's discovery's bicentenary.

== Recipients ==
Known recipients of the Jenner Medal
No.	Year	Recipient	Nationality	Notes Ref.	Image
1	1898	Sir William Henry Power (1842–1916)	United Kingdom	Power formulated the theory of airborne transmission of smallpox after observing the smallpox epidemics of 1871–1872 and 1881 in London. Presented by Manson.	
2	1902	Charles Louis Alphonse Laveran (1845–1922)	France	Known for his discovery of the malaria parasite.	
3	1912	Sir Patrick Manson (1844–1922)	United Kingdom	Presented on 22 March 1912 by the Epidemiological Section president Theodore Thomson, the Medal was awarded to Manson for his discovery of the mosquito as a carrier of the malaria parasite; mosquito-malaria theory.	
4	1921	Sir Shirley Forster Murphy (1841–1923)	United Kingdom	A former president of the Epidemiological Society, Murphy played a significant role in reducing deaths of babies in London.	
5	1922	John Christie McVail (1849–1926)	United Kingdom		
	1925	Sidney Monckton Copeman (1862–1947)	United Kingdom	At the time, Copeman was Medical Officer to the Ministry of Health, and the following year he became the Epidemiology Section's president.	
		Major Greenwood (1880–1949)	United Kingdom	(Note: According to Glover's autobiography, the seventh awardee was possibly Greenwood)	
	Before 1933	Thomas Henry Craig Stevenson (1870–1932)	United Kingdom		
9	1935	Sir George Seaton Buchanan (1869–1936)	United Kingdom	Presented on 25 January 1935.	
10	1938	Arthur Newsholme (1857–1943)	United Kingdom		
11	1951	James Alison Glover (1874–1963)	United Kingdom	Known as the "good friend of the private soldier", Glover was known for his work on carrier rates of meningococcus and overcrowding, and showing that cases of rheumatism occurred after outbreaks of sore throats caused by Streptococcus pyogenes. Presented by the RSM president Lord Webb-Johnson.	
12	1953	Alexander Thomas Glenny (1882–1965)	United Kingdom	Contributions to diphtheria immunisation	
13	1956	Percy Stocks (1889–1974)	United Kingdom	Presented by Sir Clement Price Thomas on 16 November 1956.	
14	1962	Leonard Colebrook (1883–1967)	United Kingdom	Presented in October 1962 by Lord Adrian	
15	1965	Sir Austin Bradford Hill (1897–1991)	United Kingdom		
16	1975	Sir Graham Wilson (1895–1987)	United Kingdom	Worked on the quality of pasteurization of milk, co-authored a major textbook on bacteriology, and established the Public Health Laboratory Service.	
17	1979	Alexander D Langmuir (1910–1993)	United States	Awarded on 14 May 1979.	
18	1981	Richard Doll (1912–2005)	United Kingdom	Studies on the epidemiology of cancer Presented by Walter W. Holland on 9 July 1979.	
19	1984	Karel Raška (1909–1987)	Czech Republic	He worked towards worldwide eradication of smallpox. Presented by J. P. Crowdy	
20	1987	J. N. Morris (1910–2009)	United Kingdom		
21	1991	Spence Galbraith (1927–2008)	United Kingdom	Founded the PHLS Communicable Disease Surveillance Centre (CDSC).	
	1993	Donald Acheson (1926–2010)	United Kingdom		
	1996	Donald Henderson (1928–2016)	United States	Work towards worldwide eradication of smallpox.	
	2001	Dame Rosemary Rue (1928–2004)	United Kingdom	First woman president of the Faculty of Community Medicine (now the Faculty of Public Health) and pioneer of women in medicine	
	2005				
	2010	Michael G. Marmot (b. 1945)	United Kingdom		

== See also ==
- List of medicine awards
- List of awards named after people
