= Richard Thorne Thorne =

British physician (1841–1899)

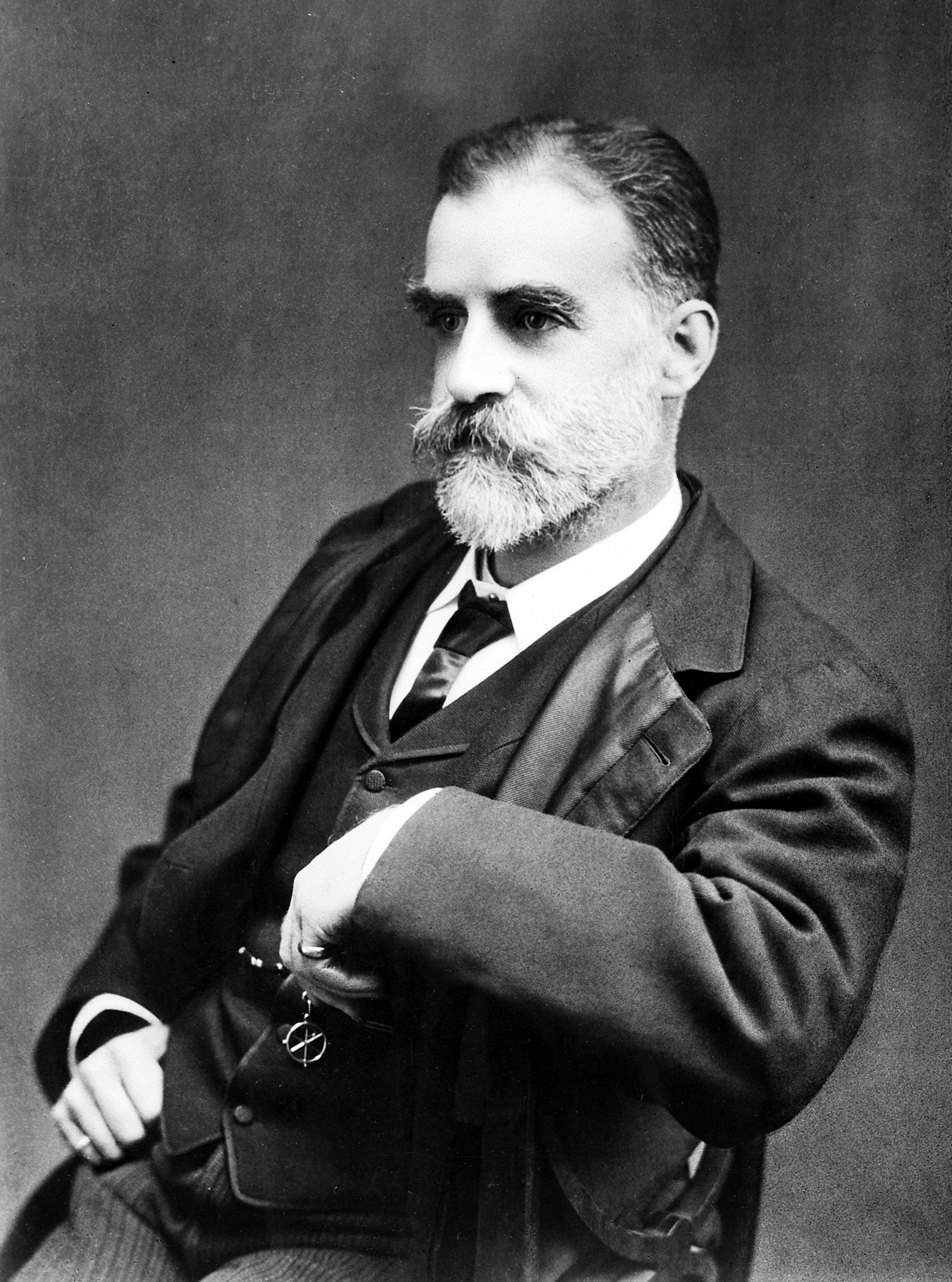
Richard Thorne Thorne

Sir Richard Thorne Thorne KCB FRS (13 October 1841 – 18 December 1899) was a British physician, the fourth Chief Medical Officer in the United Kingdom.

He was born the son of a banker in Leamington Spa, Warwickshire and was educated at Neuwied in Prussia and at a Paris lyceé. He received his medical training at St Bartholomew's Hospital, where he qualified in 1863. He graduated from London University in 1866 and was elected physician to the Royal Hospital for Diseases of the Chest.

He worked for John Simon as an inspector investigating outbreaks of typhoid fever. He succeeded George Buchanan as Chief Medical Officer for the UK in 1892 and was awarded CB the same year. He served as president of the Epidemiological Society from 1887 to 1889.

He spoke fluent French and successfully negotiated a number of international agreements on quarantine. He was knighted KCB in 1897 and elected a Fellow of the Royal Society in 1890.

After his death he was buried at St John's, Woking. His Times obituary stated

"The public has been deprived of an official of great tact, knowledge and experience."
