= Joseph Frank Payne =

English physician (1840–1910)

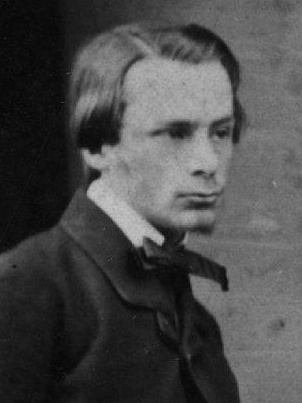
Joseph Frank Payne

Joseph Frank Payne (10 January 1840 – 16 November 1910) was an English physician, epidemiologist, and a historian of medicine.

== Early life ==
Payne was born in the parish of St. Giles, Camberwell, on 10 January 1840. He was the son of Joseph Payne, a schoolmaster, and his wife Eliza Dyer who was also a teacher, After a school education under his father at Leatherhead, Surrey, he went to University College, London; and then gained in 1858 a demyship at Magdalen College, Oxford. He graduated B.A. in 1862, taking a first class in natural science, and afterwards obtained the Burdett-Coutts scholarship in geology in 1863 and the Radcliffe travelling fellowship in 1865. He received a B.Sc. degree at the University of London in 1865.

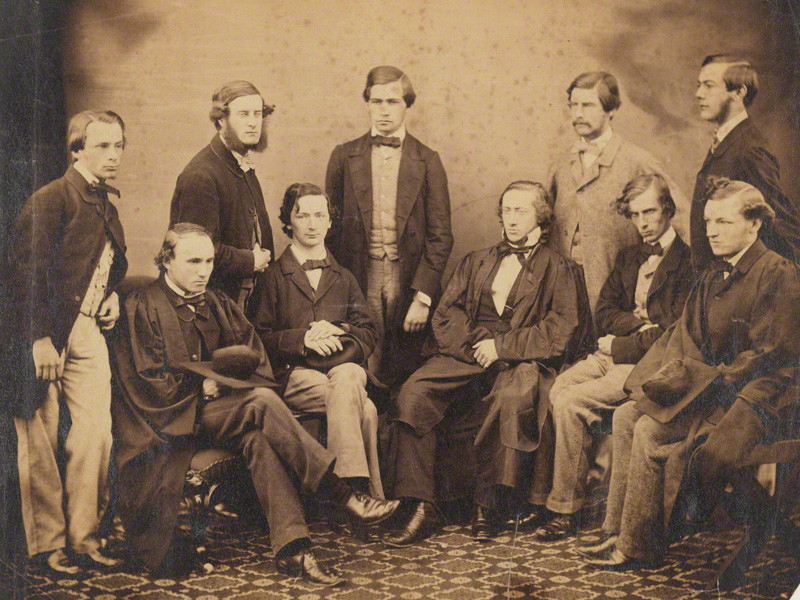
Algernon Charles Swinburne with nine of his peers (including Payne) at Oxford, ca. 1850s

Payne studied medicine at St. George's Hospital, London, and graduated M.B. at Oxford in 1867, M.D. in 1880.

== Career ==
Payne became a member of the London College of Physicians in 1868, and was elected a fellow in 1873.

His first post at a medical school in London was that of demonstrator of morbid anatomy at St. Mary's Hospital in 1869, and he became assistant physician there as well as at the Hospital for Sick Children in Great Ormond Street. In 1871 he left St. Mary's on becoming assistant physician to St. Thomas's Hospital, a post which he held till appointed physician in 1887.

In September 1877 Payne was the chief medical witness for the defence at the sensational trial in London of Louis Staunton and others for the murder of Harriet Staunton, by starvation, and argued that cerebral meningitis was the cause of death, a view which later had support. In 1879 he was sent to Russia by the British government with Surgeon-major Colvill to observe and report on the epidemic of bubonic plague then in progress at Vetlanka, but illness prevented him from achieving much.

He secured a fellowship at Magdalen College, which he vacated in 1883. He sat on the Royal Commission on tuberculosis in 1890. He was discharged in 1896 from the duty of editor of the Nomenclature of Diseases. For eight years, he was an examiner for the licence of the College of Physicians, was a censor in 1896 to 1897, and senior censor in 1905. He was also on the staff of the Hospital for Skin Diseases at Blackfriars.

He sat on the General Medical Council as representative of the University of Oxford from 1899 to 1904, and the senate of the University of London from 1899 to1906. In 1899, Payne was elected Harveian librarian of the College of Physicians, and gave many books to the library. In 1900, he had reached the age limit, and became consulting physician. He took an active part on a committee of the College of Physicians in 1905 on the Indian epidemic of plague and was chosen as the spokesman of the committee to the Secretary of State. He became an honorary fellow at Magdalen College on 30 May 1906.

== Written works ==
In accordance with the terms of Dr. Radcliffe's foundation, Payne visited Paris, Berlin, and Vienna, and made good use of their pathological opportunities. He described his experiences in three articles published in the British Medical Journal in 1871. Chosen to deliver the Goulstonian lectures in 1873, his subject was The Origin and Relation of New Growths.

Pathology, epidemiology, dermatology, and the history of medicine were the subjects in which Payne took most interest. His first major contribution to the history of medicine was a life of Thomas Linacre prefixed to a facsimile of the 1521 Cambridge edition of his Latin version of Galen, De Temperamentis (Cambridge, 1881). In 1896 he delivered the Harveian oration at the College of Physicians on the relation of William Harvey to Galen, and in 1900 wrote a life of Thomas Sydenham. He read (21 January 1901) a paper before the Bibliographical Society On the "Herbarius" and "Hortus Sanitatis."

In 1903 and 1904 Payne delivered the first FitzPatrick lectures on the history of medicine at the College of Physicians. The first course was on English Medicine in the Anglo-Saxon Times (Oxford, 1904), the second on English Medicine in the Anglo-Norman Period, covering Gilbertus Anglicus and the contents of his Compendium Medicinæ had never before been thoroughly set forth. The lectures of 1904 which Payne was preparing for the press at the time of his death address the writings of Ricardus Anglicanus and the anatomical teaching of the Middle Ages. Payne demonstrated that the Anatomy of the Body of Man, printed in Tudor times and of which the editions extend into the middle of the seventeenth century, was not written by Thomas Vicary, whose name appears on the title-page, but was a translation of a mediæval manuscript.

Payne wrote articles on the history of medicine in the Encyclopædia Britannica, and in Clifford Allbutt's System of Medicine (vol. i. 1905), besides several lives in this Dictionary. During the spring of 1909 he delivered a course of lectures on Galen and Greek medicine at the request of the delegates of the Common University Fund at Oxford. His last historical work was entitled 'History of the College Club,' and was privately printed in 1909. In 1907, Payne sought approval from the council of the Royal Society of Medicine to include regular discussions on the history of medicine.

In 1875 Payne edited Charles Handfield Jones and Edward Henry Sieveking's Manual of Pathological Anatomy, and in 1888 published a Manual of General Pathology. He read papers before the Pathological Society, of which he became president in 1897. He delivered at the College of Physicians in 1901 the Lumleian lectures On Cancer, especially of the Internal Organs.

Payne wrote articles on plague in the Encyclopædia Britannica, ninth edition, St. Thomas's Hospital Reports, Quarterly Review (October 1901), and Allbutt's System of Medicine, vol. 2, 1907. He printed in 1894, with an introduction on the history of the plague, the Loimographia of the apothecary William Boghurst, who witnessed the London plague of 1665, from the manuscript in the Sloane collection. He made contributions to the Transactions of the Epidemiological Society, of which he was president in 1892-3. In 1889 he published Observations on some Rare Diseases of the Skin, and was president of the Dermatological Society (1892-3); papers by him are in its Transactions.

Failing health interrupted Payne's writing in his last year.

== Personal life ==
Payner married, on 1 September 1882, Helen, daughter of the Hon. John Macpherson of Melbourne, Victoria, by whom he had one son and three daughters. He lived at 78 Wimpole Street while engaged in practice, and after his retirement at New Barnet. He served on the committee of the London Library.

After his health failed in 1909, Payner died at Lyonsdown House, New Barnet, on 16 November 1910. He was buried at Bell's Hill cemetery.
