= McGonagle =

McGonagle (also McGonigle, McGonagall, McGonigal, McGonegal, or McGonnigal) is a surname. The name and its variants derive from the Irish name Mac Congail.

Notable people with the surname include:

- Allan McGonigal (born 1964), Scottish footballer
- Ambrose McGonigal (1917–1979), British Army soldier and judge
- Brendan McGonigle (1939–2007), reader in psychology at the University of Edinburgh in Scotland
- Bruce McGonnigal (born 1968), American football player
- Caolan McGonagle (born 1995/6), Irish Gaelic footballer
- Charles McGonigal (born 1968/1969), American former FBI official
- David McGonigal (born 1950), Australian writer and photographer
- Declan McGonagle (born 1953), Irish art curator and professor of art at University of Ulster
- Elvis McGonagall (born 1960), Scottish poet and stand-up comedian
- Geoffrey McGonagle (born 1974), Irish dual GAA player who played Gaelic football and hurling for Derry
- George M'Gonigle (1889–1939), Medical Officer for Health in Stockton-on-Tees from 1924 to 1939
- Gracie McGonigal (born 2002), British actress
- Jamie McGonnigal (born 1975), American actor
- Jamie McGonigle (born 1996), Northern Irish footballer
- Jane McGonigal (born 1977), American video game designer
- Jerry McGonigle (born 1958/59), associate professor of acting and directing at West Virginia University in Morgantown, West Virginia
- Kelly McGonigal (born 1977), American health psychologist
- Kevin McGonigle (born 2004), American baseball player
- Leilani McGonagle (born 1999), Costa Rican professional surfer
- Paul McGonagle (1939–1974), mobster, leader of the Mullen Gang involved in burglary and armed robbery in Boston, Massachusetts
- Paul McGonigle (born 1970s), Irish Gaelic footballer
- Pearl McGonigal (born 1929), Canadian politician
- Peter McGonagle (1904–1956), Scottish footballer who played mainly for Celtic
- Richard McGonagle (born 1946), American actor
- Stephen McGonagle (1914–2002), Irish trade unionist
- William McGonagall (1825–1902), infamous Scottish poet
- William McGonagle (1925–1999), United States Naval officer who received the Medal of Honor

== Other uses ==
=== Fictional characters ===
- "The Great McGonigle," W. C. Fields' character in the film The Old Fashioned Way
- Minerva McGonagall, a character in the Harry Potter series; deputy headmistress and leader of Gryffindor house

=== Places ===
- McGonigle Hall, athletic facility on the campus of Temple University in Philadelphia, Pennsylvania
- McGonigle, Ohio, unincorporated community in northwestern Hanover Township, Butler County, Ohio
- McGonagle Site, RI-1227, historic site in Scituate, Rhode Island
