= James Alison Glover =

British physician

- Born: 21 February 1874; Highbury, North London, England
- Died: 17 September 1963 (aged 89)
- Education: St Paul's School, London; St. John’s College, Cambridge; Guy's Hospital, London
- Known for: Association of carrier rates of meningococcus with overcrowding; Geographic variation in the number of tonsillectomies in school children; Studies on rheumatic fever after Strep. throats; First editor of Monthly Bulletin of the Ministry of Health and the Public Health Laboratory Service
- Medical career
- Profession: Physician
- Field: Epidemiology
- Awards: Milroy Lecture (1930); Jenner Medal (1951)

James Alison Glover FRSM CBE (21 February 1874 – 17 September 1963) was a British physician, known for his epidemiological studies associating carrier rates of meningococcus with overcrowding, revealing geographic variations in the number of tonsillectomies in school children in England and Wales, and showing that cases of rheumatic fever occurred after outbreaks of sore throats caused by Streptococcus pyogenes.

== Early life and education ==
James Glover was born on 21 February 1876 in Highbury, North London, to physician James Grey Glover and Mary Muller. He completed his early education at St Paul's School before gaining admission to St. John’s College, Cambridge, where he earned a bachelor's degree in the Natural Science Tripos in 1897. He then entered Guy's Hospital to study medicine, and became dresser to Henry Howse and Sir William Arbuthnot Lane.

== Early career ==
In 1899, before completing his medical studies, Glover joined the City Imperial Volunteers, and served in the Boer War, in which he took part in the Battle of Diamond Hill. Once his medical skills were discovered, he was seconded to No. 2 Field Hospital of the New South Wales Army Medical Corps as an honorary lieutenant. After gaining his medical degree in 1901, Glover's early posts included obstetric resident to Alfred Lewis Galabin and house surgeon to Sir Henry Morris.

In 1917 Glover became medical officer in charge of London's Cerebrospinal Fever Laboratory. (Note: The Central Cerebrospinal Fever Laboratory at the Royal Army Medical College was established by the War Office in early 1915 for the purpose of research, developing diagnostic tests and coordinating the military response.) There he studied carrier rates of meningococcus and associated high carrier rates with overcrowding and meningitis epidemics. He found that "spacing-out" of beds prevented epidemics of meningitis in the military. The finding earned him the reputation of being a "good friend of the private soldier".

In 1920 Glover became medical officer to the then new Ministry of Health. There, he first worked under Sir George Seaton Buchanan. A committee on epidemics in schools, formed by the Medical Research Council, came as a result of Glover's 1928 paper on nasopharyngeal epidemics in public schools. In 1929, he was appointed deputy senior medical officer to Arthur MacNalty. Together, they investigated tuberculosis and epidemic diseases. In 1934 he was appointed to the Ministry of Education as senior medical officer. There, his work with MacNalty looked at nutrition in children, milk and meal provision in schools, and later medical provision for the evacuation of school children.

Glover's investigations of epidemics of rheumatic fever revealed that they occurred a few weeks after outbreaks of sore throats caused by Streptococcus pyogenes. He published three main reports relating to rheumatology. The first, in 1924, demonstrated the significance of rheumatic diseases as a cause of illness, the second focused on rheumatic fever and heart disease in children, and the third, in 1928, dealt with chronic arthritis.

Glover's study of the geographic variation in the number of tonsillectomies in school children in England and Wales was published in 1938. (Note: His 1938 paper was reprinted in 2008 by Oxford University Press on behalf of the International Epidemiological Association.) He noted that tonsillitis occurred more frequently in girls, yet boys underwent tonsillectomy more frequently. His paper revealed that the number of tonsil operations was not related to the number of cases of tonsil disease, and found no other explanation for the variation other than differences in indication for surgery and medical opinion. The paper is considered a "classic" and a "core component of health services research using epidemiology for understanding rates of intervention as opposed to disease".

== Later career ==
Glover retired in 1941 only to become immediately re-employed as a temporary medical officer of the Ministry of Health. During the Second World War he served in the Home Guard and later as medical officer to the 2nd City of London Regiment. Glover was the first editor of the Monthly Bulletin of the Ministry of Health and the Public Health Laboratory Service, first issued in 1943.

Glover's Ministry of Health responsibilities included editing for the Chief Medical officer (CMO) the document, "On the state of the public health during six years of war". (Note: Wilson Jameson was the Chief Medical Officer of the Ministry of Health at the time.) For the years 1946 to 1950, he edited the CMO of the Ministry of Health's annual reports, and for ten years he edited the medical department of the Ministry of Education's annual reports. In 1952 Glover retired to Berkhamsted.

== Awards and honours ==
In 1919, Glover gained an O.B.E, and then a C.B.E in 1941. He delivered the Milroy Lecture in 1930, on the topic of rheumatic diseases. In 1933 he was made Fellow of the Royal College of Physicians. In 1940, Glover became president of the Epidemiological Section of the Royal Society of Medicine (RSM), London. In 1951 Lord Webb-Johnson, the then-president of the RSM, presented Glover with the eleventh Jenner Medal. In the same year he was made Fellow of the RSM.

== Personal life ==
Glover's other pastimes included fencing, swimming, cycling, and archaeology. He married Katherine, daughter of C. P. Merriam, in 1907. They had four sons, one of whom became an ophthalmologist, and another who died young. In later years his mobility was affected by arthritis of the hips.

Glover died on 17 September 1963. He is remembered for being the first to officially recognise the medically unexplainable regional variation in tonsillectomy; his 1938 report formed the basis of research on practice variation, and is sometimes known as the Glover phenomenon. He wrote an autobiography with the request that it only be published after his death.

== Selected publications ==
- Glover, J. A. (October 1918). "Observations on the Meningococcus Carrier-Rate in relation to density of population in Sleeping Quarters". The Journal of Hygiene. 17 (4): 367–379. doi:10.1017/s0022172400007221. ISSN 0022-1724. PMC 2206827. PMID 20474661.
- Glover, J.A., (1920) “Observations of the Meningococcus Carrier Rate and their Application to the Prevention of Cerebrospinal Fever”. Cebrospinal Fever. Special Report Series, 50, 133-165.
- Glover, J. A. (July 1928). "Some Observations on Naso-pharyngeal Epidemics in Public Schools". Proceedings of the Royal Society of Medicine. 21 (9): 1593–1610. doi:10.1177/003591572802100934. ISSN 0035-9157. PMC 2102612. PMID 19986581.
- "Milroy Lectures On the incidence of rheumatic diseases". The Lancet. 215 (5560): 607–612. March 1930. doi:10.1016/S0140-6736(00)57184-0.
- Glover, J. Alison (August 1938). "The Incidence of Tonsillectomy in School Children". Proceedings of the Royal Society of Medicine. 31 (10): 1219–1236. doi:10.1177/003591573803101027. ISSN 0035-9157. PMC 2076749. PMID 19991659.
- Glover, J. Alison (January 1946). "Acute Rheumatism in Military History". Proceedings of the Royal Society of Medicine. 39 (3): 113–118. doi:10.1177/003591574603900303. ISSN 0035-9157. PMC 2181439. PMID 19993221.
- Glover, J. A. (June 1946). "Acute Rheumatism". Annals of the Rheumatic Diseases. 5 (4): 126–130. doi:10.1136/ard.5.4.126. ISSN 0003-4967. PMC 1011586. PMID 18623744.
