= McMonagle =

McMonagle is a surname. Notable people with the surname include:

- Donald R. McMonagle (born 1952), manager, Launch Integration, at the Kennedy Space Center, Florida
- Gerald McMonagle (born 1936), former Democratic member of the Pennsylvania House of Representatives
- Gerry McMonagle, political figure in Ireland
- Hugh McMonagle (1817–1889), inn-keeper and political figure in New Brunswick
- John I. McMonagle (1913–1992), former Democratic member of the Pennsylvania House of Representatives
- John McMonagle, judge and political figure in Nova Scotia

== See also ==
- McGonagle
