= Bisset Hawkins Medal =

British triennial physician award

The Bisset Hawkins Medal is a triennial award made by the Royal College of Physicians of London to acknowledge work done in the preceding ten years in advancing sanitary science or promoting public health. It is named after Francis Bisset Hawkins (1796–1884), a distinguished London physician and is presented after the Harveian Oration.

The medal, made of gold, was endowed by Captain Edward Wilmot Williams in 1896.

== Medallists ==
Medallists have been:

- 1899: James Burn Russell
- 1902: William Henry Power
- 1905: Patrick Manson
- 1908: Sir Shirley Forster Murphy
- 1911: Clement Dukes
- 1914: Sir Ronald Ross for his researches on malaria
- 1917: Sir Arthur Newsholme
- 1920: Sir William Heaton Hamer
- 1923: Sir Thomas Morison Legge
- 1926: Sir Ambrose Thomas Stanton
- 1929: Sir Edward Mellanby
- 1932: Thomas Henry Craig Stevenson
- 1935: Sir George Newman
- 1938: Major Greenwood
- 1941: Sir Frederick Norton Kay Menzies
- 1944: Brigadier J. A. Sinton
- 1947: Christopher Howard Andrewes
- 1950: Sir William Wilson Jameson
- 1953: William Norman Pickles
- 1956: Graham Selby Wilson
- 1959: Percy Stocks
- 1962: Sir Richard Doll, for contributions to preventative medicine
- 1965: Sir George Edward Godber
- 1968: Charles Montague Fletcher
- 1971: Sir Derrick Melville Dunlop
- 1974: Patrick Joseph Lawther
- 1977: Major John Alistair Dudgeon
- 1980: Jeremy Noah Morris
- 1983: Abraham Manie Adelstein
- 1986: Geoffrey Arthur Rose
- 1989: Sir Donald Acheson
- 1992: Rosemary Rue
- 1995: Sir Kenneth Charles Calman
- 1998:
- 2001: Kay-Tee Khaw
- 2004: Michael Gideon Marmot
- 2007: John Britton
- 2010:
- 2013: Nicholas Finer
- 2016: Sir Ian Gilmore
- 2019: Dr Sarah R Anderson - for work to improve national TB Control
- 2022: Dr Deirdre Anne Buckley
- 2025: Prof Neeraj Bhala

== See also ==
- List of medicine awards
- Prizes named after people
