= Norman Chevers =

English physician and surgeon

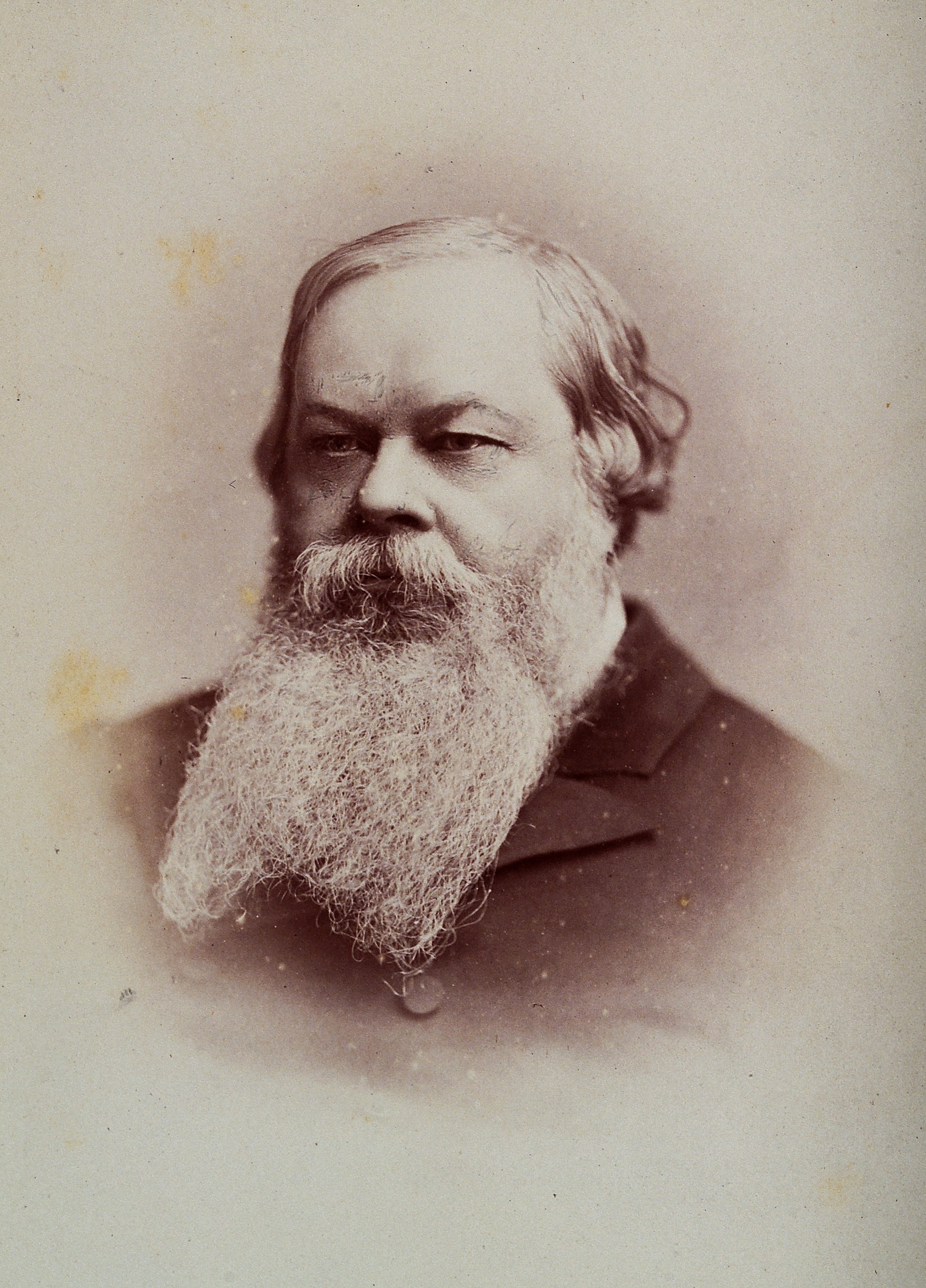
Norman Chevers, 1881 photograph

Norman Chevers (1818–1886) was an English physician and surgeon of the Bengal Medical Service. He is known for research on constrictive pericarditis.

== Life ==
He was born at Greenhithe in Kent, the son of the naval surgeon Forbes Macbean Chevers and his wife Anne Talman. He was educated at Haslar, Guy's Hospital, and Glasgow University, where he graduated M.D. in 1839, aged 21.

After graduation Chevers worked for nine years at Guy's Hospital, researching in physiology, while in private practice in Upper Stamford Street, south London. He joined the Bengal Medical Service in 1848.

Chevers became Principal of Calcutta Medical College in 1862. He retired from medical work in India in 1876, with the rank Deputy Surgeon General. He returned to England, and became involved in the Epidemiological Society, acting as its President.

== Views ==
Chevers took burning feet syndrome to be a form of "malarial neuralgia". In later life he argued against the germ theory, in particular for enteric fever and cholera.

In his jurisprudence manual, Chevers was an early advocate of the use of photography. He thought it would be particularly useful for investigation of murders in rural areas.

Physiological investigation by Chevers was used to argue against child marriage. He reported as true the origin of sati being the need to prevent wives poisoning husbands, in order to take a new lover. He was also a temperance advocate.

== Works ==
- A Treatise on Removable and Mitigable Causes of Death (1852)
- A Manual of Medical Jurisprudence for Bengal and the North-Western Provinces (1856)
- The Sanitary Position and Obligations of the Inhabitants of Calcutta (1863), lecture to the Bethune Society
- A Commentary on the Diseases of India (1886)
