= T. H. C. Stevenson =

Irish statistician

Thomas Henry Craig Stevenson CBE (24 November 1870 – 12 September 1932) was a Northern Irish statistician.

He was born in Strabane, County Tyrone, and educated at Strabane Academy, Trinity College Dublin, and University College, London, before receiving his MB at the University of London. He set up in practice and read for an MD in State Medicine and was later offered a post in the Brighton Public Health Department. After posts in public health elsewhere, he became the School Medical Officer of Somerset County Council. In 1909, he was appointed Superintendent of Statistics in the General Register Office.

Responsible for the 1911 census in the UK which was published in 1913, he originated the idea of social class classification, divided into three basic classes (the upper, middle and working classes) commonly known as the Registrar General's Social Classes.

He was awarded the Guy Medal in Gold by the Royal Statistical Society in 1920, the Edward Jenner Medal by the Royal Society of Medicine in 1931, and the Bisset Hawkins Medal by the Royal College of Physicians in 1932. He was appointed a CBE in 1919.
