= Medical Officer of Health for London =

Public elected position for the city of London established in 1848

The medical officer of health for London was a publicly elected position for the city of London, established in 1848. It was the second municipal position of its kind in England, the first being help by William Henry Duncan in Liverpool. Soon after, all regions of Greater London were required to have a medical officer of health.

== Notable medical officers of health for London ==
- Arthur Newsholme
- William Henry Duncan, Liverpool
- John Simon, 1848–1855
- Henry Letheby, 1855–1873
- John Simon, City of London (1848–1855)
- John Bristowe, Camberwell
- William Rendle, St. George Southwark (1856–1859)
- Edwin Lankester, St. James
- George M'Gonigle, Stockton-on-Tees (1924–39)
- C. Killick Millard, Leicester (1901–35)

== See also ==
- Metropolitan Commission of Sewers
