= John McVail =

Scottish physician and public health expert

John Christie McVail FRSE LLD (22 October 1849- 29 July 1926) was a Scottish physician and public health expert. He helped to establish the National Health Insurance system in the UK.

== Life ==
McVail was born on 22 October 1849 in Kilmarnock the second son of James McVail and his wife, . His older brother was David McVail (later Sir David McVail).

He was educated at Kilmarnock Academy then studied medicine first at the University of Glasgow and then at the University of St Andrews graduating with a MB Chb in 1873. He became a general practitioner in Kilmarnock, and gained his doctorate (MD) in 1875. Inspired by Henry Littlejohn in Edinburgh he developed an interest in public health and the application of statistics to public health. In 1885, he gained a Diploma in Public Health from the University of Cambridge and succeeded Dr Borland as Medical Officer of Health for the Kilmarnock area also becoming a Physician at Kilmarnock Infirmary. In 1891, he left Kilmarnock to become Medical Officer of Health for Stirlingshire and Dunbartonshire. From 1887 he was President of the Sanitary Association of Scotland.

In 1890, he was elected a Fellow of the Royal Society of Edinburgh his proposers being Joseph Bell, Andrew Wilson, Andrew Douglas Maclagan, and John Brown Buist. He resigned from the Society in 1908. In 1922, the Epidemiology section of the Royal Society of Medicine awarded him the Jenner Medal.

In 1922, he retired to Golders Green in London and then moved to Torquay on the south coast of England where he died on 29 July 1926.

== Family ==
In 1877 he married Jessie Schoolbred Rowat. They had two sons and two daughters. His son John Borland McVail married the daughter of his friend John Glaister.

== Publications ==
- Vaccination Vindicated: Being an Answer to the Leading Anti-Vaccinators (1887)
- Dr. C. Creighton, M.D. and Vaccination: A Review (1889)
- Report to the Royal Commission on Poor Laws (1918)
- McVail, J. C. (5 April 1919). "The Milroy Lectures; On Half a Century of Smallpox and Vaccination". British Medical Journal. 1 (3040): 408–412. doi:10.1136/bmj.1.3040.408. ISSN 0007-1447. PMC 2341039. PMID 20769438.
