= Royal Commission on Tuberculosis =

Late 1890s investigation into history of tuberculosis

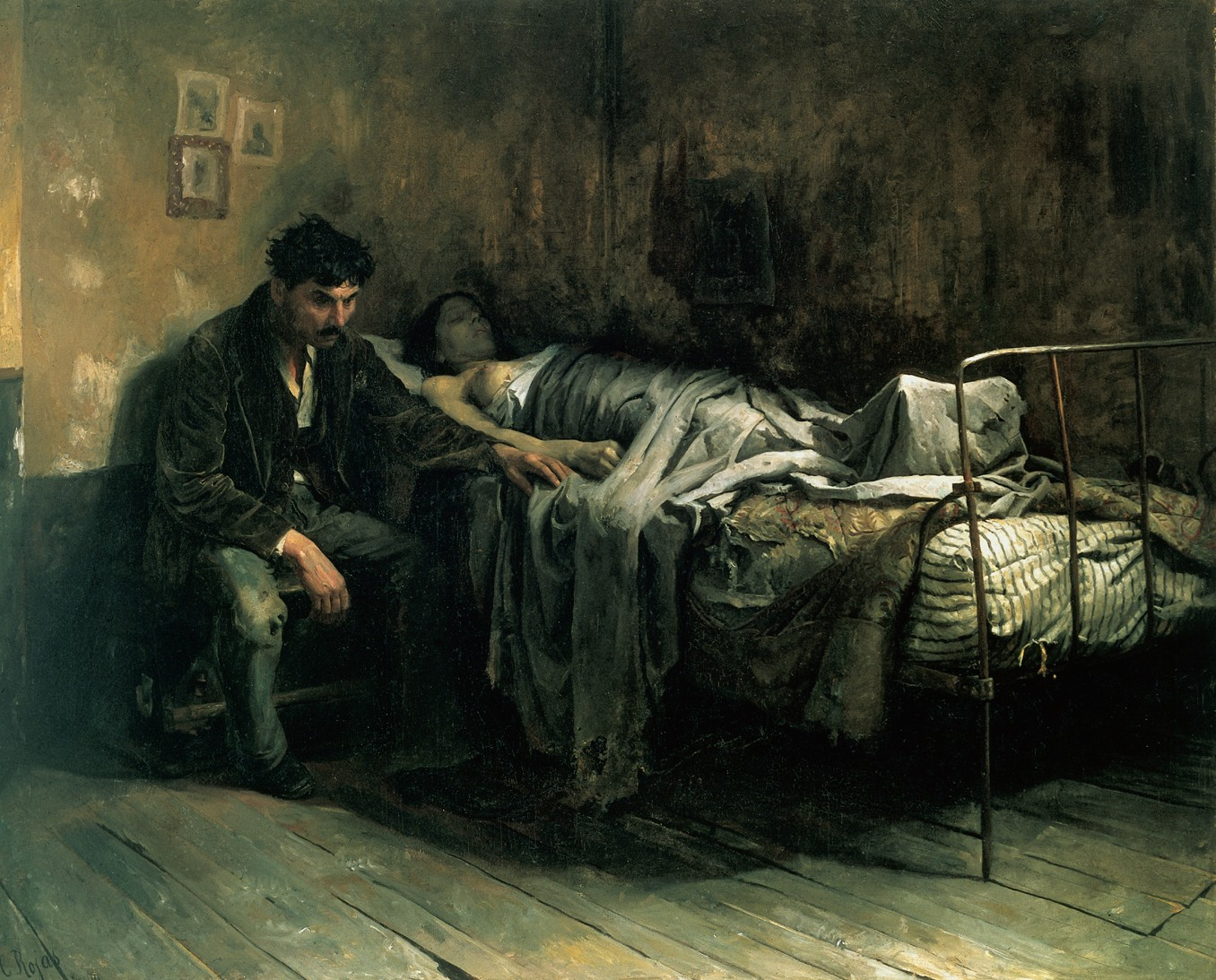
La Miseria by Cristóbal Rojas (1886). Rojas had tuberculosis when he painted this. Here he depicts the social aspect of the disease, and its relation with living conditions at the close of the 19th century.

The Royal Commission on Tuberculosis (1896–1898), also known as the First Royal Commission on Tuberculosis, was an early investigation into the history of tuberculosis (TB). On 25 April 1895 the report was published as a parliamentary paper.

Tuberculosis, "the greatest scourge of civilized life," was technically preventable. It was common knowledge that bacillus tuberculosis invaded almost every body organ. One in eight UK deaths was directly attributable to the disease. The recent advances could be categorised under transmission by infected meat and milk; heredity transmission; and preventative measures.

As the work of the commission continued, by April 1897, Sir Herbert Maxwell held the chair A further royal commission was set up in 1901 to Inquire into the Relations of Human and Animal Tuberculosis. Sir William Henry Power, the Medical Officer for London who had formulated the theory of aerial conveyance of smallpox chaired the Commission.

A seminal recommendation of the Royal Commissions was the creation of a permanent medical research body. The Medical Research Council was founded as the Medical Research Committee and Advisory Council in 1913. The mandate was not limited to tuberculosis however, with its prime role being the distribution of medical research funds under the terms of the National Insurance Act 1911.

== History ==
On 24 April 1890, Lees Knowles, then parliamentary secretary to Charles Ritchie, President of the Local Government Board, brought a motion before the House of Commons and was subsequently appointed to formulate the commission.

In 1890 the German physician and microbiologist Robert Koch developed tuberculin, a purified protein derivative of the bacteria. In 1891 The Veterinary College at Dorpat produced seminal research using the Tuberculin test on 1,000 cattle. and by 1891 the British Medical Journal was reporting a new perspective of inquiry: careful examination into the meat and milk inspection; experimental research; and collection of statistics regarding the degree of infectivity of the products of tuberculous animals. That year in Parliament, Knowles challenged Henry Chaplin, 1st Viscount Chaplin, President of the Board of Agriculture over amending the Contagious Diseases (Animals) Act 1878.

By 1893 the enormity of experimental inquiry was becoming known while the Government resisted the clammer to compensate farmers for culls until a report was published. In May 1894 Mr Shaw-Lefevre reported that the report "may be shortly expected". Following the death of previous chairman Lord Basing in October 1894, George Buchanan, was appointed to the position and by February 1895 Shaw-Lefevre was reporting "there are grounds for hoping no very long time will elapse before the report..." By March 1895, Buchanan remained chairman despite his bout of illness.

On 25 April 1895 the report was published as a parliamentary paper. Tuberculosis, "the greatest scourge of civilized life," was technically preventable. It was common knowledge that bacillus tuberculosis invaded almost every body organ. One in eight UK deaths was directly attributable to the disease. The recent advances could be categorised under heredity transmission; transmission by infected meat and milk; and preventative measures.

As the work of the commission continued, by April 1897 Sir Herbert Maxwell held the chair and headed a continental visit which was arranged for committee members visiting Brussels, Cologne, Berlin and Leipzig.

== See also ==
- Frederick Griffith
