= Thomas Stanton (surgeon) =

Sir Thomas Stanton
- Born: Ambrose Thomas Stanton; 14 November 1875
- Died: 25 January 1938 (aged 62)
- Education: Trinity Medical College, Toronto; University College, London
- Known for: beri-beri investigation
- Awards: KCMG; FRCP; Bisset Hawkins Medal

Sir Ambrose Thomas Stanton KCMG FRCP (14 November 1875 – 25 January 1938) was a Canadian surgeon, entomologist and health administrator who helped to identify the cause of beri-beri. He later became Chief Medical Adviser to the British Secretary of State for the Colonies.

He was born in the village of Kendal, Durham County, Ontario to storekeeper Thomas Stanton and educated at the local Port Hope High School on the north shore of Lake Ontario. After graduating from Trinity Medical College, Toronto in 1899, he worked as a house surgeon at The Hospital for Sick Children and Toronto General Hospital before becoming surgeon on a liner in 1901.

In 1905 he moved to England to continue his medical studies at University College and the London Hospital, earning a Diploma in Tropical Medicine and Hygiene (DTM&H) in 1906. He joined the Hospital for Tropical Diseases as a house surgeon, rising to registrar, and also taught at the London School of Tropical Medicine.

In 1907 he left to work in Malaya with Henry Fraser at the Institute for Medical Research in Kuala Lumpur on a project to investigate the cause of beri-beri, a debilitating disease which afflicted the local people. He lived for nearly a year in a remote part of the jungle where a new road was being constructed. There he arranged that one group of labourers were supplied with a diet of polished rice and another group with unpolished rice. When the group fed on polished rice developed beri-beri they were able to deduce that beri-beri was a disease of the metabolism caused by a dietary deficiency related to the rice polishing process. The unpolished rice was subsequently found to contain trace amounts of alcohol-soluble substances, later to be known as vitamins, and in particular of vitamin B1.

He was also a keen entomologist and did important work on the identification and classification of mosquitos and mosquito larvae. When an outbreak of a new disease in the Malayan rubber plantations occurred in 1917 he was able to identify the cause as an outbreak of melioidosis, caused by a bacterial contamination of groundwater.

In 1920 he was put in charge of the Institute and in 1926 made the first Chief Medical Officer at the Colonial Office, where he advised the Secretary of State for the Colonies on medical matters affecting some fifty crown colonies and protectorates.

He served on several committees such as the Colonial Advisory Medical Committee and the managing committee of the Bureau of Hygiene and Tropical Diseases. He was also a board member of the London School of Hygiene and Tropical Medicine and a member of the councils of the Royal Society of Tropical Medicine and Hygiene and the British Empire Leprosy Relief Association.

He died in 1938. He had married in 1930 Dr. Elizabeth O'Flynn.

== Honours and awards ==
- 1911: Awarded Craigs Research Prize of the London School of Tropical Medicine
- 1926: Elected Fellow of the College of Physicians
- 1926: Awarded Bisset Hawkins Medal by the Royal College of Physicians
- 1929 New Year Honours: Created a Companion of the Order of St Michael and St George (CMG)
- 1933: Honorary D.Sc. of the University of Toronto
- 1934 Birthday Honours: Promoted to Knight Commander of the Order of St Michael and St George (KCMG)
