= Edward Cator Seaton =

British physician (1815 – 1880)

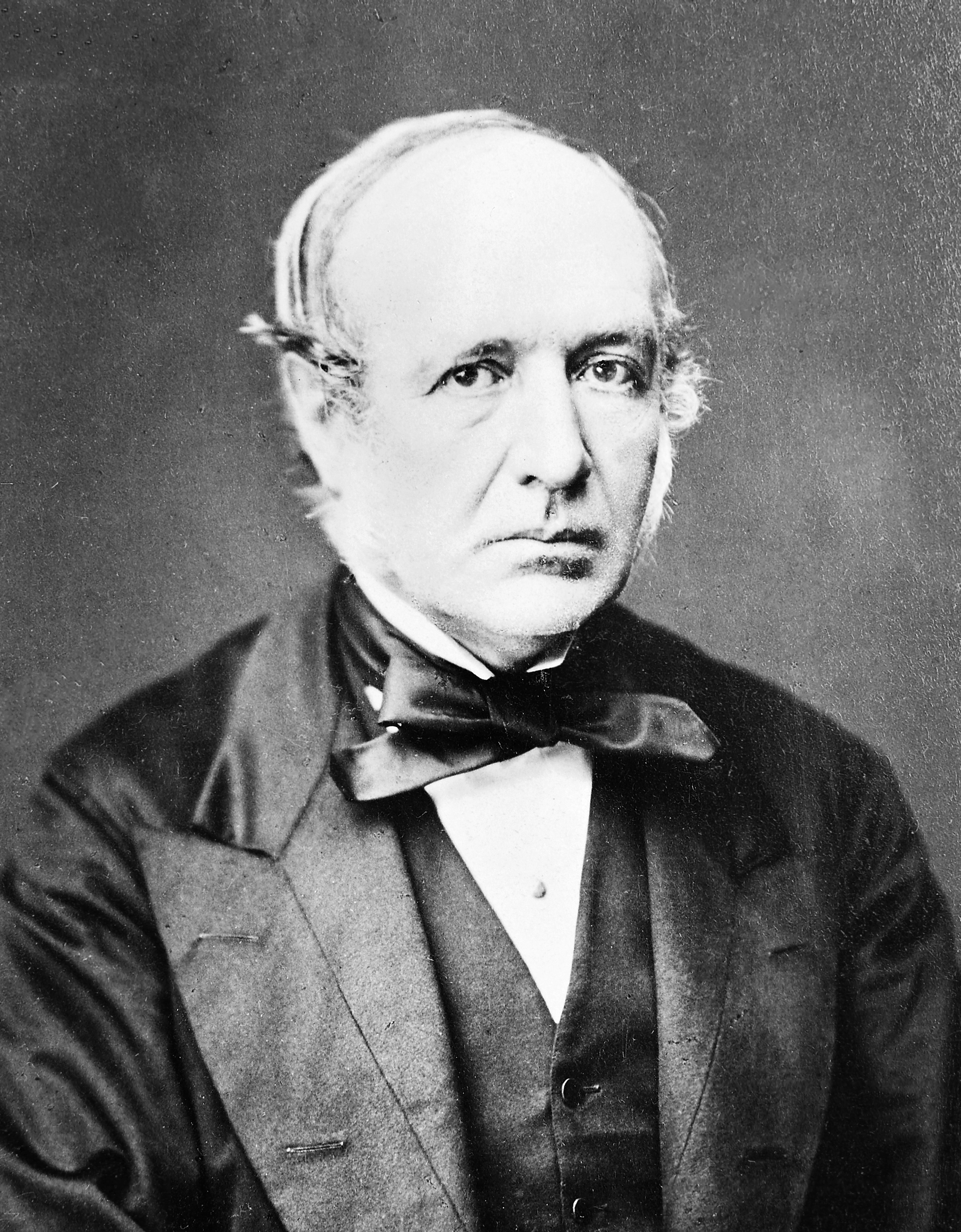
Edward Cator Seaton

Edward Cator Seaton (1815 – 21 January 1880) was an English medical doctor who became the second Chief Medical Officer of the United Kingdom.

== Life ==
Seaton studied medicine at the University of Edinburgh and moved to London in 1841. He made his professional reputation with a report on vaccination against smallpox for the Epidemiological Society of London which was presented to Parliament in 1852. He was then appointed as the vaccination inspector under the Vaccination Act 1853 (16 & 17 Vict. c. 100) by John Simon. When Simon resigned in 1876, he was appointed Chief Medical Officer.

He is buried at Kensal Green Cemetery, London.
