= Sydney Copeman =

Sydney Arthur Monckton Copeman K.St.J FRS FRCP
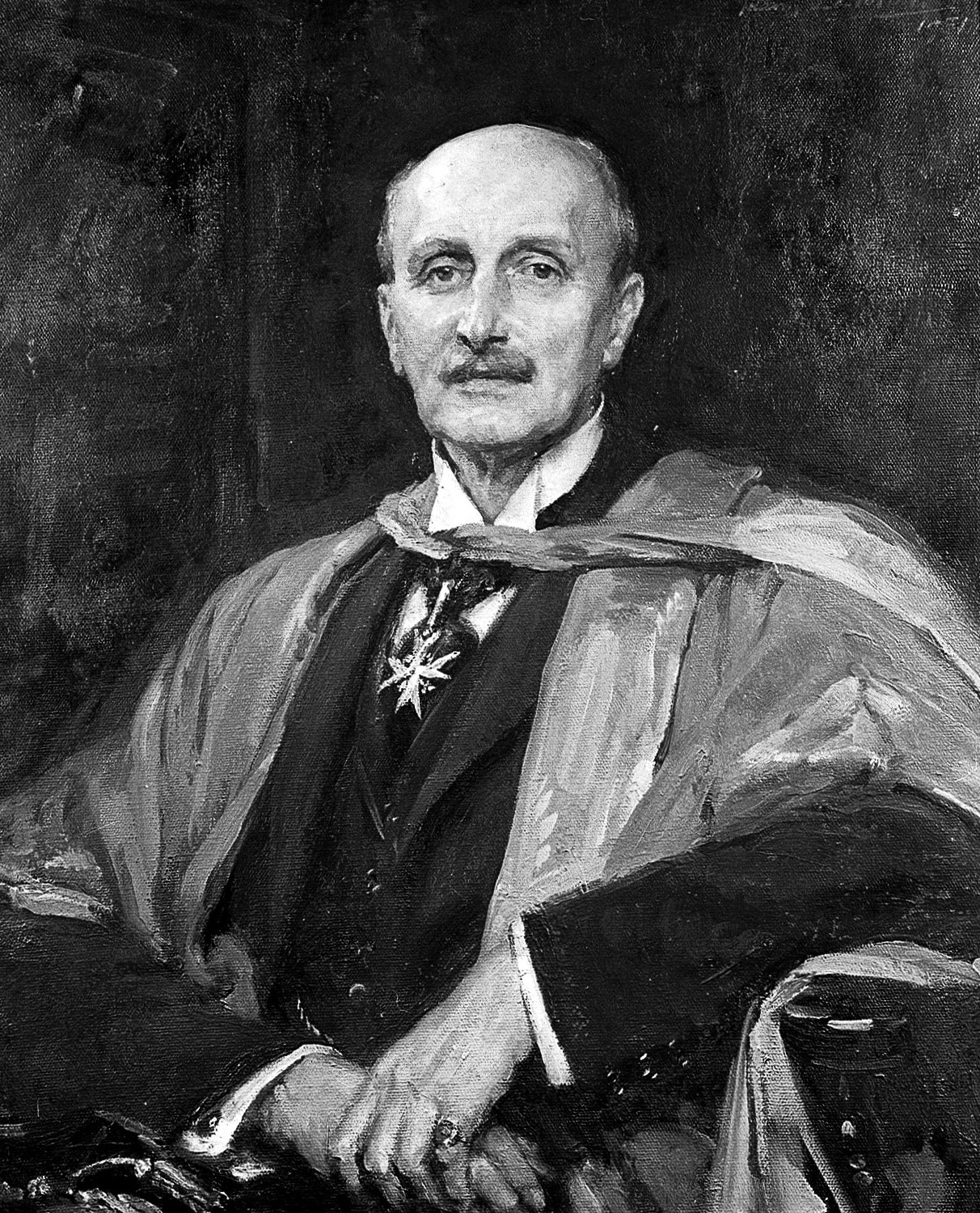
- Sydney Copeman
- Born: 21 February 1862
- Died: 11 April 1947 (aged 85)
- Awards: Cameron Prize for Therapeutics of the University of Edinburgh (1898)

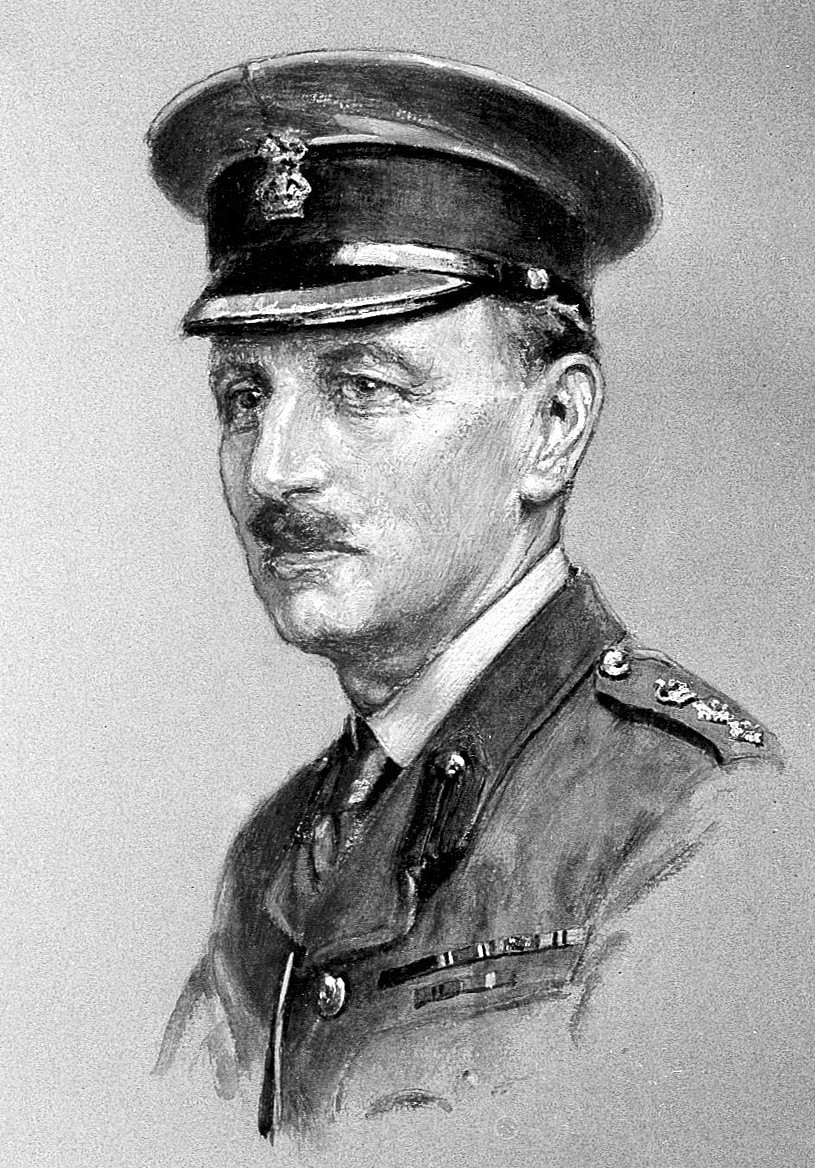
Sydney Copeman

Sydney Arthur Monckton Copeman K.St.J FRS FRCP (21 February 1862 – 11 April 1947) was a British medical doctor and senior medical officer in the Ministry of Health.

He was the eldest son of Rev Arthur Charles Copeman, Vicar of St Andrew's Norwich. He was educated at Norwich School and Corpus Christi College, Cambridge from which he graduated in 1882. He went on to undergo medical training at St Thomas' Hospital, London, qualifying in 1886. He obtained a post-graduate MD at Cambridge University in 1890.

In 1891 he became a medical inspector with the Local Government Board. In 1898, he was awarded the Cameron Prize for Therapeutics of the University of Edinburgh. When the Ministry of Health replaced the board in 1919, Copeman became a medical officer with the ministry, retiring in 1925. He was an authority on vaccination, and is credited with the development of glycerinated lymph. In 1898 he delivered the Milroy Lecture on Vaccination – Its Natural History and Pathology, published as a book in the following year. and was elected a Fellow of the Royal College of Physicians in 1899. In 1903 he was elected a Fellow of the Royal Society and in 1925 was awarded the Edward Jenner Medal of the Royal Society of Medicine.

Following his retirement from the Ministry of Health, Copeman entered local government. He was a member of Hampstead Borough Council, where he was chairman of the public health committee, and was elected to the London County Council as a Municipal Reform Party councillor representing Hampstead in 1934.

He died in Hove, Sussex, in April 1947, aged 85. Copeman's son W. S. C. Copeman became a prominent rheumatologist and medical historian. He had married Ethel Margaret Boord, daughter of Sir Thomas William Boord. They had one son and two daughters.
