= Alexander Glenny =

British immunologist (1882–1965)

Alexander Thomas Glenny
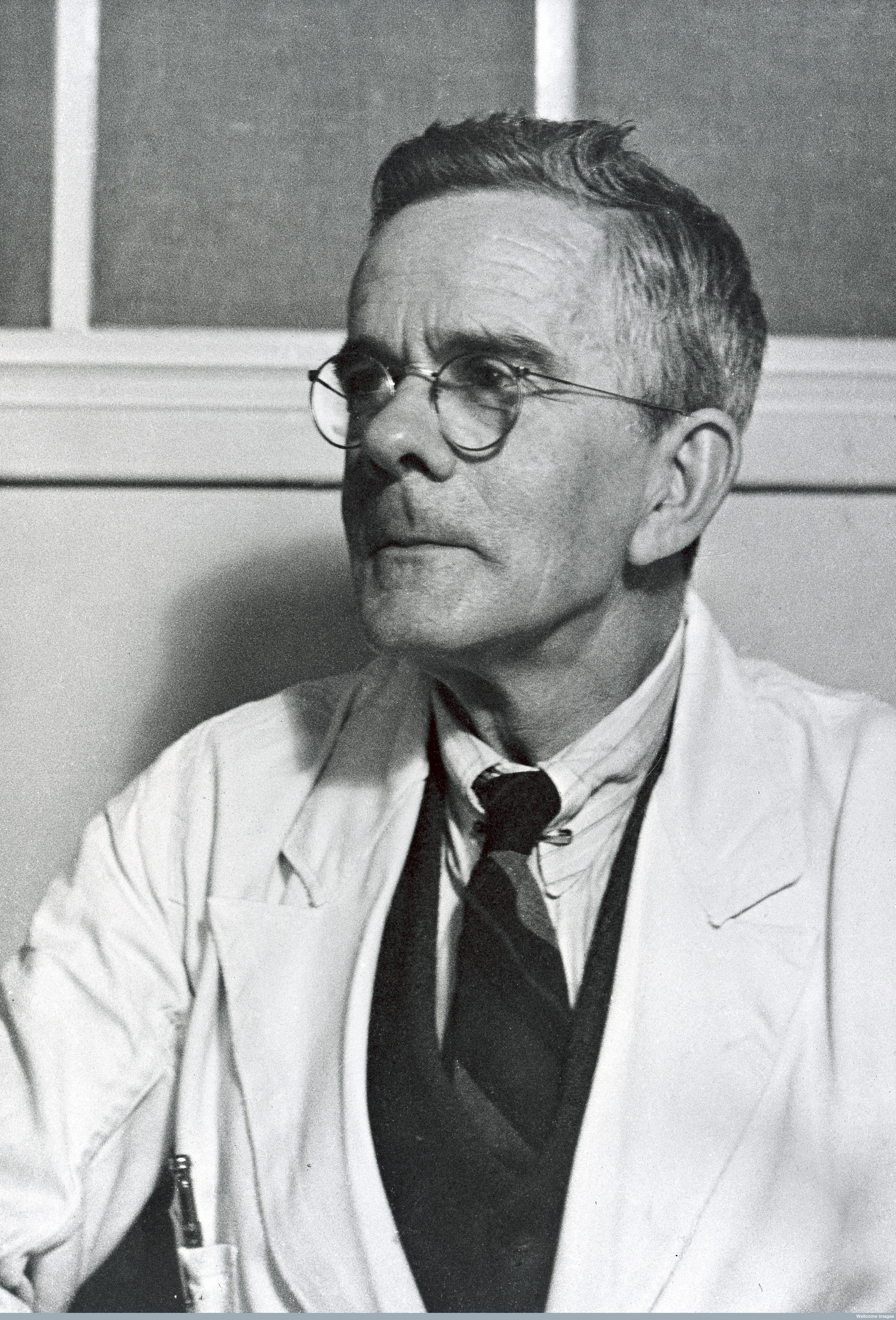
- Born: 18 September 1882; Camberwell
- Died: 5 October 1965 (aged 83)

Alexander Thomas Glenny (18 September 1882 – 5 October 1965), was a British immunologist known particularly for his work on the prevention of diphtheria.

== Early life and education ==
Glenny was born in Camberwell, London, England, educated at Alleyn's School, Dulwich, and awarded a B.Sc. by the University of London in 1905.

== Career ==
In 1899 Glenny started working for the Wellcome Physiological Research Laboratories, then in Central London, becoming head of the immunology department in 1906. He worked on immunizations and antitoxins against diseases, including tetanus and diphtheria, and, later, chemical weapons.

Glenny's scientific work focused on the mechanisms of antibody production and the prevention of diphtheria. In 1921 he and H. J. Südmersen discovered the primary and secondary immune response. In the same paper they also briefly described the properties of diphtheria toxoid, which had been discovered by Glenny in 1904, apparently by accident. In 1925-6 he developed alum-precipitated diphtheria toxoid. He was elected Fellow of the Royal Society in 1944 and awarded the Edward Jenner Medal by the Royal Society of Medicine in 1953.

== Death ==
Glenny died in 1965. He had married Emma Blanche Lillian Gibbs (born 1886) on 7 July 1910. They had three children, John (1913), Peter (1915), and Barbara (1918).
