= Leonard Colebrook =

English physician and bacteriologist

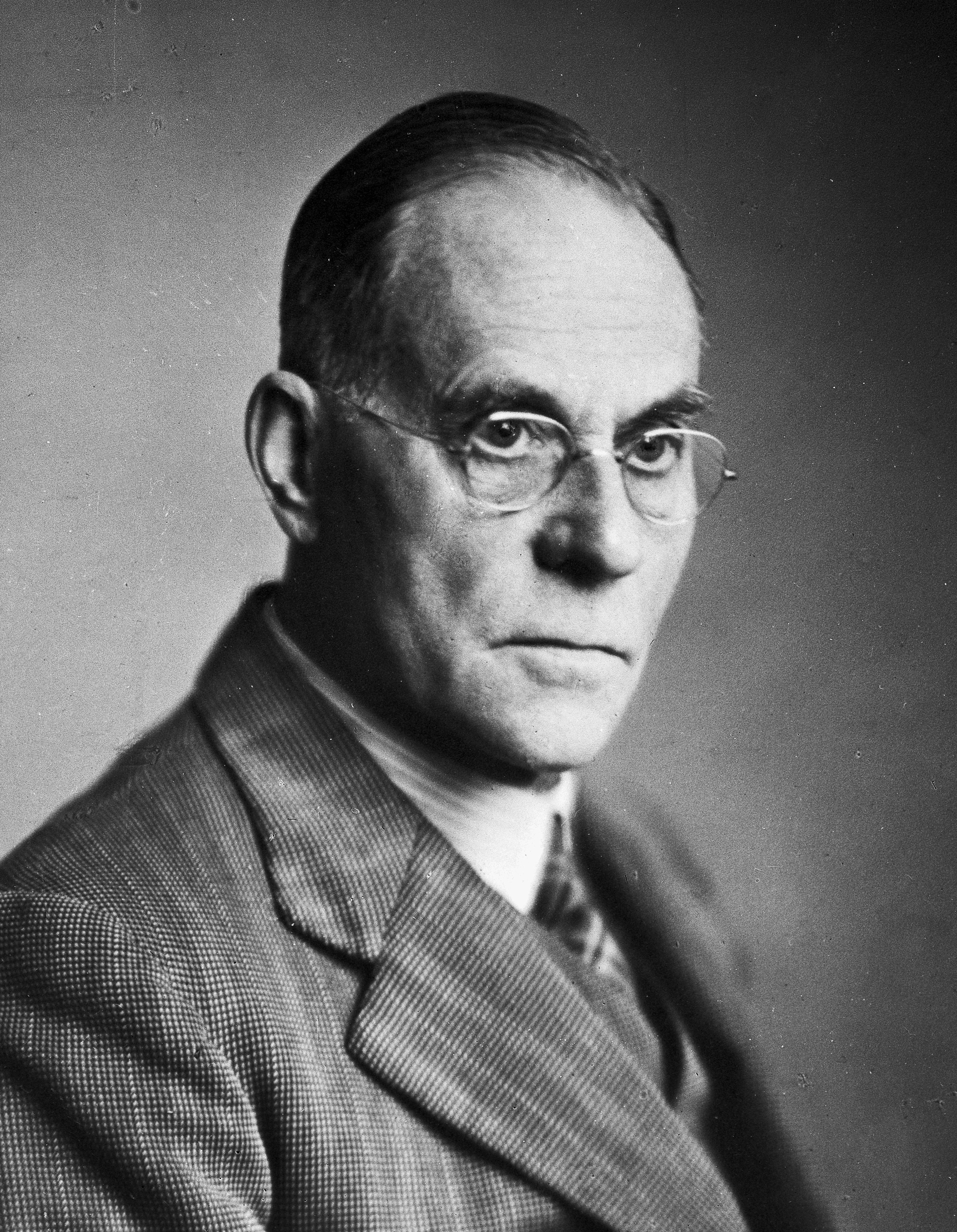
- Leonard Colebrook in 1945; By Walter Stoneman
- Born: 2 March 1883; Guildford, Surrey, England
- Died: 27 September 1967 (aged 84); Farnham Common, Buckinghamshire, England
- Education: Royal London Hospital; St Mary's Hospital, London
- Known for: Prontosil
- Awards: Fellow of the Royal Society (1945); FRCS; FRCOG; Blair Bell medal(1955); Edward Jenner Medal (1962)
- Scientific career
- Fields: Medicine

Leonard Colebrook FRS (2 March 1883 – 27 September 1967) was an English physician and bacteriologist.

== Education ==
Colebrook was educated at the Grammar School in Guildford (1891–96), Westbourne High School in Bournemouth (1896–99) and Christ's College Blackheath in Kent (1899 - 1900). Colebrook started his medical training at the London Hospital Medical College after which he won a scholarship to St Mary's Hospital, London, graduating in 1906 with M.B. and B.S. (Lond). degrees.

== Career ==
He stayed at St Mary's Hospital Medical School from 1907 - 14. he was initially appointed as an assistant to Sir Almroth Wright in the inoculation Department. He worked on vaccine therapy, tuberculosis and pneumonia.

At the outbreak of the First World War he was appointed as a captain in the Royal Army Medical Corps and the Battalion Medical Officer of the Kensington Regiment. He stayed initially at St Mary's Hospital but in 1917 was transferred to France where he worked on wound infections with Sir Almroth Wright at No. 13 General Hospital, Boulogne.

In 1919 he became an assistant again in the Bacteriology Department of the National Institute of Medical Research in Hampstead. However, in 1922 he transferred to St Mary's Hospital and worked with Sir Almroth Wright again for a further seven years. He became an expert on bacterial chemotherapy, working with arsenic-containing compounds. These were effective in the laboratory against the bacteria that caused disease such as puerperal sepsis, but turned out to be too toxic to be effective in people, despite substantial efforts to find a suitable treatment protocol.

In 1929 Colebrook was appointed Director of the Research Laboratory at Queen Charlotte's Hospital in London. His research interest was puerperal sepsis, a bacterial infection following childbirth that killed around 2000 women in England and Wales at that time. In 1935 Colebrook showed Prontosil was effective against haemolytic streptococcus in childbirth and hence a cure for puerperal fever. His use of Prontosil was the first clinical trial of any antibiotic, that demonstrated a reduction in death rates from 1 in 4 to 1 in 20.

His sister Dora Colebrook was a bacteriologist, also working at Queen Charlotte's Hospital, London. She investigated the source of the streptococcal infections within the hospital. After collecting samples of the bacteria from patients, their families and hospital staff, she used immunology to identify individual strains. This showed that the strains causing puerperal sepsis were not special but were the same ones present in the community that caused sore throats. They were acquired by women after childbirth rather than before. Working together, the Colebrooks showed that streptococci were more likely to originate from hospital staff than from the patient. He campaigned for the use of gloves, mask, and gown before touching patients and showed that chloroxylenol was both an effective disinfectant and superior to soap and water for hand cleansing.

In the Second World War he was appointed a Colonel in the Royal Army Medical Corps and Bacteriological Consultant to the British Expeditionary Force, working first in France and then England. Treatment of infections in burns was his focus and in 1942 he moved to Glasgow as Director of the Medical Research Council's Burns Unit in Glasgow's Royal Infirmary. His interest in why skin grafts were often unsuccessful led to contact with Peter Medawar who later discovered the biology underlying successful tissue grafts.

Following administrative difficulties with providing suitable treatment conditions, he moved the Burns Unit to Birmingham Accident Hospital in 1944 and continued as its Director until he retired in 1948. There he established the practice of placing the burns patients in a near sterile environment.

Following his retirement, he and his wife Vera promoted the use of guards on all portable electric heaters to prevent clothes catching alight. Despite substantial opposition, their campaign led to legislation requiring these guards (Heating Appliances (Fireguards) Act, 1952) and increased interest in flame-proof clothing.

== Family ==
Colebrook was born in Guildford, Surrey to May Colebrook (1838-1896) and Mary née Gower (1845- ). His father was a farmer, nonconformist preacher and active to benefit the local community. He had two brothers and three sisters, among whom the youngest, Dora, became a bacteriologist, as well as seven half-siblings from his father's first marriage.

In 1914 he married Dorothy Scarlett Campbell (1875-1941), a social worker, daughter of John Scarlett Campbell (1828-1897), a judge in the Indian service. After her death he married again, in 1946, Vera Locke (1903-1984), a freelance broadcaster and widow of Edward Robert Scovell (1881-1944). There were no children from either marriage. His main hobby was gardening.

He died in 1967 at his home in Farnham Common, Buckinghamshire.
