= Kay-Tee Khaw =

British physician and academic

Kay-Tee Khaw CBE FRCP FMedSci
- Born: 14 October 1950 (age 76)
- Spouse: James Fawcett (m. 1980)
- Children: Two
- Scientific career
- Fields: Medicine; Epidemiology; Gerontology
- Workplaces: London School of Hygiene and Tropical Medicine; St Mary's Hospital, London; University of California, San Diego; School of Clinical Medicine, University of Cambridge; Gonville and Caius College, Cambridge

Kay-Tee Khaw, CBE, FRCP, FMedSci (born 14 October 1950) is a Singaporean British physician and academic, specialising in the maintenance of health in later life and the causes and prevention of chronic diseases. She has been Professor of Clinical Gerontology at the University of Cambridge since 1989 and a Fellow of Gonville and Caius College, Cambridge since 1991.

== Early life and education ==
Khaw was born on 14 October 1950 to Khaw Kai Boh and Tan Chwee Geok. She studied medicine at Girton College, Cambridge, graduating with a Bachelor of Arts (BA) degree; as per tradition, her BA was later promoted to a Master of Arts (MA Cantab) degree. She continued her medical studies at Cambridge and at St Mary's Hospital Medical School, graduating with Bachelor of Medicine, Bachelor of Surgery (MB BChir) degrees. She studied epidemiology at the London School of Hygiene and Tropical Medicine, graduating with a Master of Science (MSc) degree.

== Career ==
From 1979 to 1984, Khaw held a Wellcome Trust Research Fellowship, and worked at the London School of Hygiene and Tropical Medicine, St Mary's Hospital, London, and the University of California, San Diego. In 1985, she was an adjunct assistant professor at the UC San Diego School of Medicine.

Khaw then returned to England, where she was a senior registrar in community medicine at the School of Clinical Medicine, University of Cambridge, between 1986 and 1989. In 1989, she was appointed Professor of Clinical Gerontology. In 1991, she was also elected a Fellow of Gonville and Caius College, Cambridge: since 2015, she has been a Jeffrey Cheah Professorial Fellow at the college.

== Personal life ==
In 1980, Khaw married James William Fawcett; he is Merck Company Professor of Experimental Neurology at the University of Cambridge. Together they have had two children: one son and one daughter.

== Awards and honours ==
- 1999, Khaw was elected a Fellow of the Academy of Medical Sciences (FMedSci).
- In 2001, she was awarded the Bisset Hawkins Medal by the Royal College of Physicians.
- In the 2003 Queen's Birthday Honours, she was appointed a Commander of the Order of the Bath (CBE) "for services to medicine".
