= Francis Bisset Hawkins =

English physician (1796–1894)

Francis Bisset Hawkins (18 October 1796 – 7 December 1894) was an English physician.

He was born the son of Adair Hawkins, a London surgeon and educated at Eton College and Exeter College, Oxford, gaining BA in 1818, MA in 1821, MB in 1822 and MD in 1825. His brother was William Bentinck Hawkins, FRS.

He was elected a fellow of the Royal College of Physicians in 1826 and was their Gulstonian lecturer in 1828, Censor (i.e. examiner) in 1830 and Lumleian lecturer in 1835. From 1828 to 1832 he was physician at the Westminster Dispensary and in 1833 a Factory Commissioner enquiring into the conditions of child employment in factories.

He was appointed the first Professor of Materia Medica (in modern terms Pharmacology) at King’s College, London in 1829, resigning the chair in 1835, and was elected a Fellow of the Royal Society in 1834.

He was appointed an inspector of prisons in 1836 and as a metropolitan commissioner in lunacy in 1842, a position he held until 1845. In 1847-48 he was commissioner for the government of Pentonville prison.

In his Report on the Health and Condition of the Manufacturing Districts, he recommended a reduction in the hours of work for children and women and the creation of public gardens and parks in Manchester, both of which took place. In his Reports on Prisons he successfully recommended a reduction in the use of solitary confinement. He was also largely responsible for the insertion of an extra column to record the names of the disease or cause of death on the new death register introduced in 1837 by the Act for the Registration of Births and Deaths.

Towards the latter part of his career he moved from London to Bournemouth and in 1858 was appointed a Deputy Lieutenant of Dorset. He died a widower at the age of 98, having no children.

The Bisset Hawkins Medal, established in 1896 by the Royal College of Physicians to acknowledge work done in promoting public health, was named to honour his memory.

== Published works ==
- The Elements of Medical Statistics. 8vo. London, 1829.
- The History of the Epidemic Spasmodic Cholera of Russia. 8vo. London, 1831.
- Germany; the Spirit of her History, Literature, National Economy, and Social Condition. 8vo. London, 1838.
- Reports on the Factory Commission. London, 1833.
- Reports on the Prisons of the Southern and Western Districts of England from 1836 to 1842. Folio. London.
