= Epidemiological Society of London =

The Epidemiological Society of London was a British medical society founded in 1850 with the objective of investigating the causes and conditions which influence the origin, propagation, mitigation, and prevention of epidemic disease. In 1907 it merged with the Royal Medical and Chirurgical Society of London and became a part of the Royal Society of Medicine as the Epidemiological Section and then Epidemiology and Public Health section.

== History ==
Following a severe outbreak of cholera in England in 1831-32 a London physician, J.H.Tucker, proposed in a letter to the Lancet that a society should be formed to specifically study epidemics. The first meeting of the Epidemiological Society of London took place on 6 May 1850 in Hanover Square, London. At a follow-up meeting in July, chaired by Sir Astley Cooper, a constitution was agreed and officers appointed. Benjamin Guy Babington, a Guy's Hospital physician, was elected as the first president of the society, whose agreed objectives were:

- to institute rigid examination into the causes and conditions which influence the origin, propagation, mitigation, and prevention of epidemic diseases
- to institute...original and comprehensive researches into the nature and laws of disease
- to communicate with government and legislature on matters connected with the prevention of epidemic diseases.

The seal of the society included the Latin words, venienti occurrite morbo (confront disease at its onset).

For the first ten years of its existence the society's activities were reported in the Lancet, the British Medical Journal, the Medical Times and the Sanitary Review. Thereafter the proceedings were reported in Transactions of the Epidemiological Society of London. The society held regular meetings at which papers were presented.

In 1860, the National (British) Association for the Promotion of Social Science (NAPSS) - a Department of Public Health - had as its Head of the Sub-Committee the founding President of the Epidemiological Society: B.G. Babington. Reports from members of the Epidemiological Society were recorded at the NAPSS; the two societies being linked courtesy of their members holding a scientific interest in matters epidemiological - e.g.: The society's published transactions from 1858 include a report from the Epidemiological Society which is followed by a miscellaneous paper delivered by T. M. Greenhow: "Health; how preserved, how impaired". Greenhow's nephew, Dr E Headlam Greenhow, is listed as delivering a paper: "Public Health Statistics". Dr E.H. Greenhow had held the "Chair" of the Epidemiological Society in May 1853.

In 1900 the Epidemiological Society held its final Commemoration Dinner. In 1907 it became the Epidemiology and State Medicine section of the Royal Society of Medicine.

== Awards ==
The Jenner Medal was instituted by the society in 1896 to commemorate the centenary of Edward Jenner’s first vaccination of a boy against smallpox. It features on one side the head of Jenner and on the other the globe emblem of the Epidemiological Society. It was first presented in 1898 to Sir William Henry Power.

== Past Presidents ==
- 1903–1904 Benjamin Arthur Whitelegge
- 1902–1903 William Henry Corfield
- 1900–1902 Sir Patrick Manson
- 1898–1900 H Franklin Parsons
- 1896–1898 John Lane Notter
- 1894–1896 Sir Shirley Forster Murphy
- 1892–1894 Joseph Frank Payne
- 1890–1892 Sir Joseph Ewart
- 1889–1890 Sir Thomas Crawford
- 1887–1889 Sir Richard Thorne Thorne
- 1885–1887 Walter Dickson
- 1883–1885 Norman Chevers
- 1881–1883 George Buchanan
- 1879–1881 Sir Joseph Fayrer
- 1877–1879 John Murray
- 1875–1877 John Netten Radcliffe
- 1873–1875 Sir William Smart
- 1871–1873 Robert Lawson
- 1868-1871 Edward Cator Seaton
- 1866–1868 Sir William Jenner, 1st Baronet
- 1864–1866 Gavin Milroy
- 1850–1864 Benjamin Guy Babington
