= William Henry Power =

Sir William Henry Power
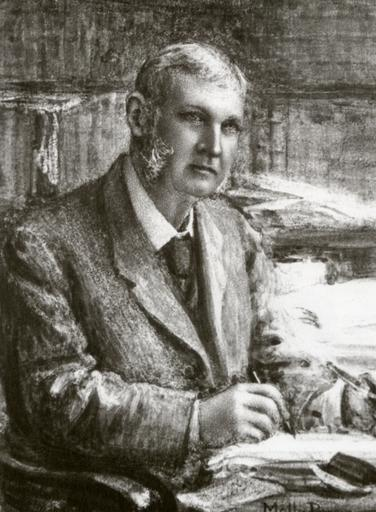
- Born: 15 December 1842
- Died: 28 July 1916

Sir William Henry Power, KCB, FRS (15 December 1842 – 28 July 1916) was a British medical doctor.

== Biography ==
William Power was born on 15 December 1842 in London, the eldest son of the surgeon William Henry Power and his wife Charlotte Smart. He studied at University College, London, before taking up an apprenticeship with his father. He qualified MRCS and LSA after studying medicine at St Bartholomew's.

Power served as Assistant Medical Officer and Medical Inspector for General Sanitary Purposes of the Local Government Board. The entomologist and lecturer of medicine, John Arthur Power was an uncle.

In January 1900, Power was appointed Chief Medical Officer of England, and served as such until 1908.

In 1898 Power was awarded the first Jenner Memorial Medal of the Epidemiological Society of London. He was elected a Fellow of the Royal Society in 1895 and awarded their Buchanan Medal in 1907. He won the Bisset Hawkins Medal from the Royal College of Physicians in 1902.

Power was appointed a Companion of the Order of the Bath (CB) in the November 1902 Birthday Honours list, and knighted as a Knight Commander (KCB) of the same order in 1908.

== Death ==
Power died at Holly Lodge, East Molesey, Surrey, in 1916.
