= Brendan McGonigle =

British psychologist (1939–2007)

Brendan Oliver McGonigle
- Born: 18 May 1939
- Died: 29 November 2007 (aged 68)

Academic background
- Education: Queen's University Belfast
- Thesis: On stimulus additivity and stimulus dominance effects in visual discrimination performance by the rat (1964)

Academic work
- Discipline: Experimental Psychology
- Institutions: University of Edinburgh

Brendan O. McGonigle (18 May 1939 – 29 November 2007) was a British/Irish experimental psychologist noted for his research on the learning activities of monkeys.

== Career ==
He received a BA (in 1961) and a PhD (in 1964) from Queen's University Belfast, Northern Ireland. In 1964 he did his postdoc at Durham University, moving in 1965 to lecture in experimental psychology at Oxford University. Following a stint as an assistant professor and NIH Research Associate at the Animal Behaviour Lab, Pennsylvania State University, he moved to the University of Edinburgh in 1969 where he was promoted through the ranks to Reader in Psychology. He died on 29 November 2007.

== Research ==
His main interest was in characterising the growth and dynamics of intelligent systems. Research on this involved comparative psychology, developmental psychology, robotics, and cognitive modelling, all integrated within one programme. Research with squirrel monkeys (Saimiri sciureus), capuchin monkeys (Cebus apella), and young children studied pre-linguistic competencies. Monkeys provided inspiration for robotic models of complex primate intelligence. A central focus was the search for cognitive tasks which could be used in animals and humans.

His work was borne from the animal learning culture of the 1960s, but he pioneered the study of more complex relational rule learning in animals by moving away from the simple two-choice discrimination paradigm characteristic of associationistic approaches to animal minds. A well known study with Margaret Chalmers published in Nature adapted a test of transitive reasoning for monkeys and showed that monkeys were capable of performing on these tasks at comparable levels of success to young children. The authors argued that both species were evincing rational choice based on linear ordering of information and later confirmed this using reaction time measures.

In his research, he was concerned to allow monkeys long-term learning opportunities comparable to that available for children, and so his subsequent work with Cebus apella was a long and staged programme in which the monkeys were trained to seriate by size and classify by shape and colour up to 12 objects on a touch screen – a level of ordering competence that only emerges in human development at around 6/7 years of age and had never before been demonstrated in a non-human species.

The sequences achieved by Cebus apella have significance for the evolution of human language. Although the monkeys were trained on a core spine such as square, circle, triangle, they transferred to extended versions such as "touch all the stars, then all the triangles, then all the hexagons" with an ease that could not be predicted by simple association learning. They also nested size relations within these classes, choosing for example large star, middle sized star, small star, large hexagon, middle sized hexagon, etc. At the end of their training the monkeys were able to simultaneously maintain 4 different sequences that randomly alternated on different trials: 9 stars ordered by size, 9 hexagons ordered by size and 9 triangles ordered by size, as well as a 9 item set composed of all three shapes – also ordered by size. This is the first example of the acquisition of a complex hierarchical structure by a non-human primate and has been cited by Hauser and McDermott (2003) as a possible exception to the claim that only humans have "infinite productivity".
