= Edward Henry Sieveking =

British doctor (1816–1904)

Sir Edward Henry Sieveking
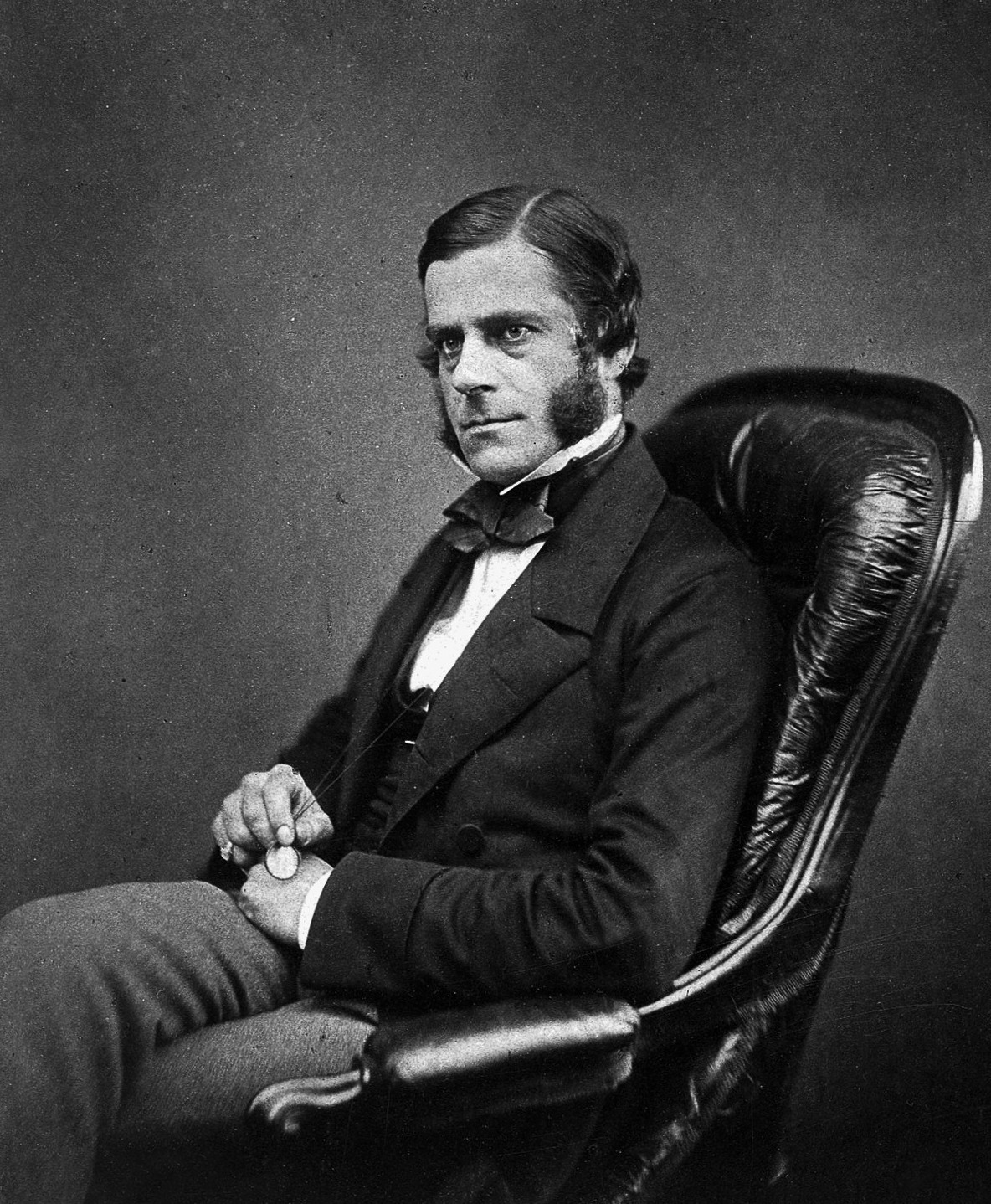
- Edward Henry Sieveking
- Born: 24 August 1816; Bishopsgate, London
- Died: 24 February 1904 (aged 87); His house on Manchester Square
- Education: University of Berlin
- Known for: epilepsy
- Scientific career
- Fields: medicine
- Doctoral advisor: Johannes Peter Muller

Sir Edward Henry Sieveking (24 August 1816 – 24 February 1904) was an English physician.

== Life ==
Sieveking was born in Bishopsgate, London. He studied medicine at the University of Berlin under eminent physiologist Johannes Peter Muller, and also at University College London and the University of Edinburgh, where he received his doctorate in 1841. In 1847, he settled in London, England. In 1851, he was named a physician and lecturer at St Mary's Hospital in London, where he remained for most of his medical career. He was also a physician at London Lock Hospital and the National Hospital for the Paralyzed and Epileptic.

Sieveking had many and varied interests in medicine. He was closely involved in the training of nurses and treatment of the poor, and had a keen interest concerning treatment of epilepsy and other neurological disorders. In 1858, he devised an aesthesiometer, a device for measuring tactile sensitivity of the skin.

He wrote several books, and was responsible for the translation of works by Carl Rokitansky and Moritz Heinrich Romberg from German into English.

He was appointed physician in ordinary to when Prince of Wales (later Edward VII) in 1863, and then physician extraordinary in 1873, and physician in ordinary to Queen Victoria in 1888. In 1886 Sieveking was knighted by Queen Victoria, and in 1901 King Edward VII appointed him Physician Extraordinary to His Majesty. In 1888, he was censor and Vice-President of the Royal College of Physicians, as well as President of the Royal Medical and Chirurgical Society, and strongly supported the reforms of 1858.

He died at his home, 17 Manchester Square, London, on 24 February 1904 and was buried on 28 February in Abney Park Cemetery, Stoke Newington.

== Writings ==
- A Treatise on Ventilation (1846)
- The Training Institutions for Nurses and the Workhouses (1849)
- A Manual of Pathological Anatomy, Carl Rokitansky (vol. ii, London, 1849) translated by Sieveking
- A Manual of the Nervous Diseases of Man, Moritz Heinrich Romberg (2 vols., London, 1853) translated by Sieveking
- British and Foreign Medico-Chirurgical Review (editor, from 1855)
- On Epilepsy and Epileptiform Seizures, their Causes, Pathology, and Treatment (London, 1858; 2nd ed. 1861)
- A Manual of Pathological Anatomy, with Charles Handfield Jones (London, 1854; 2nd ed. 1875)
- The Medical Adviser in Life Assurance (London, 1874; 2nd ed. 1882)
