= Charles Handfield Jones =

English physician

Charles Handfield Jones (1819–1890) was an English physician.

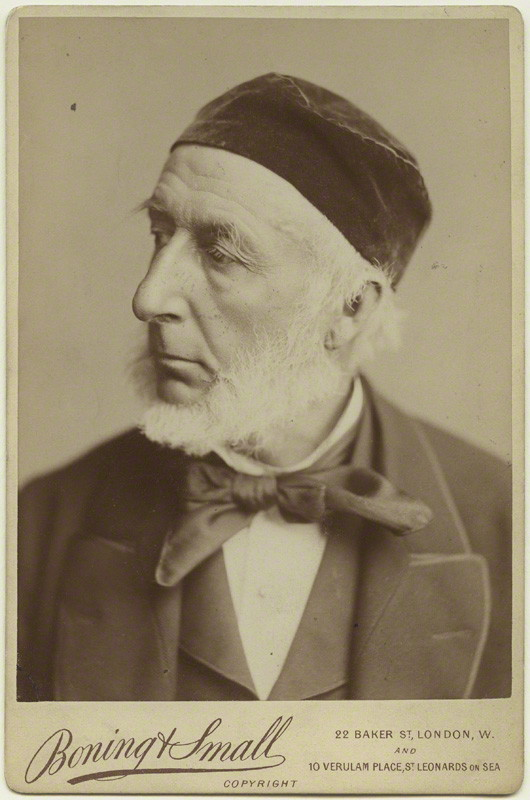
Charles Handfield Jones

== Life ==
The son of Captain Jones, R.N., Charles Handfield Jones was born in Liverpool on 1 October 1819. He was one of Thomas Arnold's pupils at Rugby School, before completing a B.A. at Catharine Hall, Cambridge between 1837 and 1840. After completing his medical studies at St. George's Hospital, London, he attained an M.B. degree at Cambridge in 1843, but never proceeded to that of an M.D.

Jones became a member of the College of Physicians of London in 1845, and was elected as a fellow in 1849. He published a paper of observations on the minute structure of the liver, which led to his election as fellow of the Royal Society in 1850. In 1851 he was employed as a physician at St. Mary's Hospital, Paddington, where he continued on the staff until his death.

Jones attained a reputation as a histologist and as a clinical observer. In the College of Physicians he was junior censor between 1863-4, senior censor in 1886, and vice-president in 1888. In 1865 he delivered the Lumleian lectures on the pathology of the nervous system.

A resident of Green Street, Park Lane, Jones later moved to Montagu Square, London where he died of stomach cancer on 30 September 1890.

== Family ==
Jones married Louisa Holt in 1851, and had two sons, who both went into the medical profession.

== Notable Publications ==
=== Books ===
- A Manual of Pathological Anatomy with Edward Henry Sieveking (1854).
- Clinical Observations on Functional Nervous Disorders (1864).

=== Papers ===
- Contributions to the Transactions of the Pathological Society.

==== In the Transactions of the Royal Medical and Chirurgical Society ====
- Some Observations on the Effect of Cholagogue medicines and some Remarks on Morbid Changes in the Liver (1852).
- Observations on Morbid Changes in the Mucous Membrane of the Stomach (1854).
- Tabular Statement of Seventy-two Cases of Haematemesis with Remarks (1860).
- Case of Intussusception in which Abdominal Section was performed (1878).

== Notes ==
Attribution

This article incorporates text from a publication now in the public domain: Lee, Sidney, ed. (1892). "Jones, Charles Handfield". Dictionary of National Biography. Vol. 30. London: Smith, Elder & Co.
