= Rosemary Rue =

British physician and civil servant (1928–2004)

DBE Rosemary Rue Dame
- Born: Elsie Rosemary Laurence; 14 June 1928; Hutton, Essex, England
- Died: 24 December 2004 (aged 76); Stanton St John, Oxfordshire, England
- Education: Royal Free Medical School
- Alma mater: University of Oxford
- Occupations: physician and civil servant
- Spouse: Roger Rue (m. 1950)
- Children: 2

Dame Rosemary Rue DBE (14 June 1928 – 24 December 2004) was a British physician and civil servant, most notable as the one-time regional general manager/medical officer of the Oxford Regional Health Authority.

== Background ==
Elsie Rosemary Laurence was born in 1928 in Hutton, Essex in England and moved with her family to London in 1933. She was evacuated in 1940 during The Blitz to stay with relatives in Devonshire, where she contracted tuberculosis and peritonitis. It was while she was convalescing that she decided on a career in medicine, entering the all-woman Royal Free Medical School in London in 1945.

In 1950, she married Roger Rue, a pilot instructor of Belgian descent in the Royal Air Force. When she told the medical school dean that she was changing her name, she was told that she could not stay at the school if she was married. She was instead accepted at the University of Oxford, qualifying in 1951 after taking the University of London exams.

Her first job was at an extended-care hospital in Oxford. She did not tell her employers that she had a husband or a newborn son, as many hospitals then didn't employ married women. She was eventually sacked when her employers learned she was married with children. In 1954, she contracted polio from a patient, becoming the last person in Oxford to get it.

Polio gave her the major, lifelong disability of having one bad leg. This left her unable to walk, even with crutches, or perform basic tasks such as carrying a medical bag. She spent time teaching at girls' schools. Unable to walk up front steps for interviews, she had to turn down several medical jobs.

New hospitals were constructed in Swindon, Reading and Milton Keynes, with basic modules that could be incorporated into every hospital. In 1960, she was named Assistant County Medical Officer for Hertfordshire and worked as a part-time paediatrician in Watford. She spent an academic term at the Institute of Child Health in London. In 1965, she was offered the job of Senior Assistant Medical Officer for the Oxford region, running that region's health authority. In the early 1960s new money was allocated by the government to rebuild the crumbling medical system in the UK. Dr Rue ensured that Oxford got a fair share.

== Later positions ==
In 1972, she became one of the founders of the Faculty of Community Health (now the Faculty of Public Health), which brought together academic bodies such as the London School of Hygiene and Tropical Medicine, community health doctors, and organisations such as the Public Health Laboratory Service (PHLS). She served as the PHLS Regional Medical Officer from 1973 to 1984, and Regional General Manager from 1984 to 1988.

She became a Dame Commander of the Order of the British Empire in 1989.

== Positions ==
- President of the Medical Women's Federation (1982–1983)
- President of the Faculty of Community Medicine of the Royal College of Physicians (1986–1989)
- President of the British Medical Association (1990–1991)
- Founding Fellow of Green College, Oxford
- Awarded the Jenner Medal of the Royal Society of Medicine (2001)

== Death ==
During her last few years, Dame Rosemary continued to take an active interest in health service matters, despite both breast and colon cancer. She died, aged 76, at her cottage in Stanton St John, Oxfordshire on 24 December 2004, aged 76. She was survived by her two sons.
