= George M'Gonigle =

George M'Gonigle (1889–1939) was Medical Officer of Health for Stockton-on-Tees, UK. He was labeled "The housewives champion" for his work in studying malnutrition and poverty.

== Life and career ==
George Cuthbert Mura M'Gonigle was the only son of William M'Gonigle, vicar of Ellingham, Northumberland, UK. He trained at Newcastle upon Tyne Medical School, graduating from Durham University in 1910 (MD, 1913). From 1924 until his relatively early death from pneumonia in 1939, he was a general practitioner of medicine and served as Medical Officer of Health for Stockton-on-Tees, an industrial town which, during the Great Depression, suffered one of the worst unemployment rates in Britain, peaking at around 50%.

M'Gonigle made it his life's work to document the effects of poverty on health. These focused on nutritional needs. Reports included Poverty, Nutrition and Public Health. This found that mortality rates increased when slum-dwellers were moved to new-built, healthier housing estates. This counter-intuitive finding was explained by poverty: M'Gonigle established that housewives could no longer afford a balanced diet for their families as household rents increased and income dwindled with unemployment.

His book with John Kirby, Poverty and Public Health (1936) brought these matters to the attention of politicians and social reformers, and set the Stockton studies in a broader context. The book summarized the poor state of health of the general population, drawing on government records. This highlighted the generally poor state of health of the English population. For instance, only around half the male population was fit for active military service in World War I. One third of children aged 5–12 (national survey, 1933) required medical treatment or observation for potential clinical conditions. Regional data showed health inequalities related to class, with the children from professional classes in Tyneside being both heavier and taller than those from the poorer areas. M'Gonigle and Kirby were among the first to point to the statistical correlation between income (and employment) and mortality. M'Gonigle's three major field studies in Stockton-on-Tees were also included. Thus, M'Gonigle and Kirby, using publicly available data together with empirical studies, demonstrated that "poverty, not ignorance, was the cause of morbidity and mortality amongst the poor and this poverty was not the fault of the individual families but of a society that provided inadequate wages and welfare benefits."

== Reputation ==
During his lifetime, M'Gonigle was recognized as a champion of public health, although his views did not accord with those of the medical establishment, and he was not honored by it. He became known to the general public with the publication of Poverty and Public Health. During the 1940s, his reputation was sustained, helped by a documentary film championing his work as Medical Officer of Health. The improvement in national nutritional standards through the 1940s-70s, especially through the provision of the National Health Service reflected the impact of his findings. He has been honored with a commemorative plaque in his home town. However, his name did not figure widely in the history of public health until the 21st century. His reputation as a pioneer of public health is now being restored.

In 2012, Durham University named one of their medicine lecture theatres at Queens Campus, Stockton in honour of M'Gonigle and his work in the local area. M'Gonigle was an alumnus of the University.
