= John Simon (pathologist) =

English public health officer (1816–1904)

Sir John Simon KCB FRS FRCS
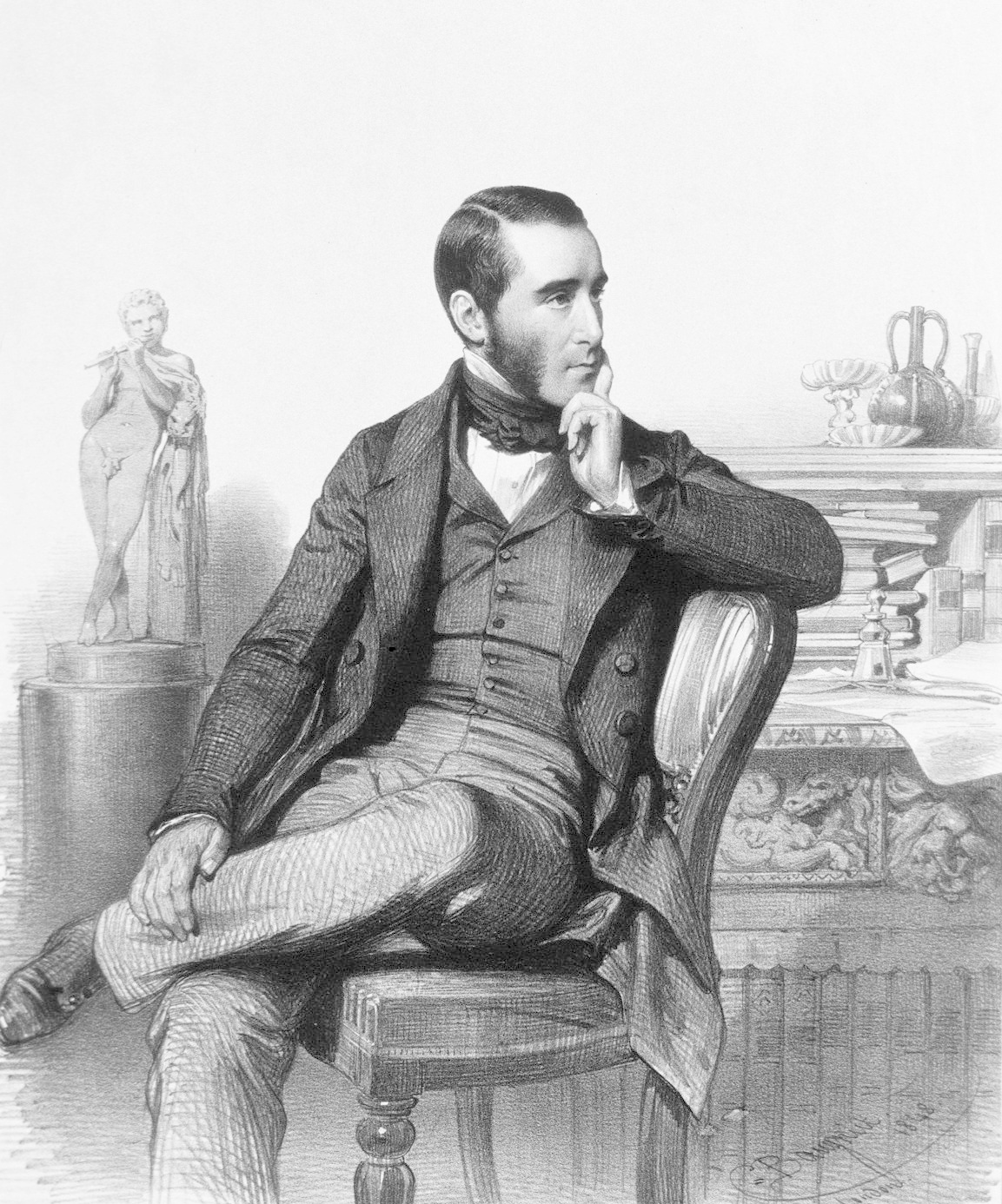
- Lithograph of John Simon by Charles Baugniet (1848)
- Born: October 10, 1816; London, England
- Died: July 23, 1904 (aged 87); London, England
- Occupation: Chief Medical Officer

Signature
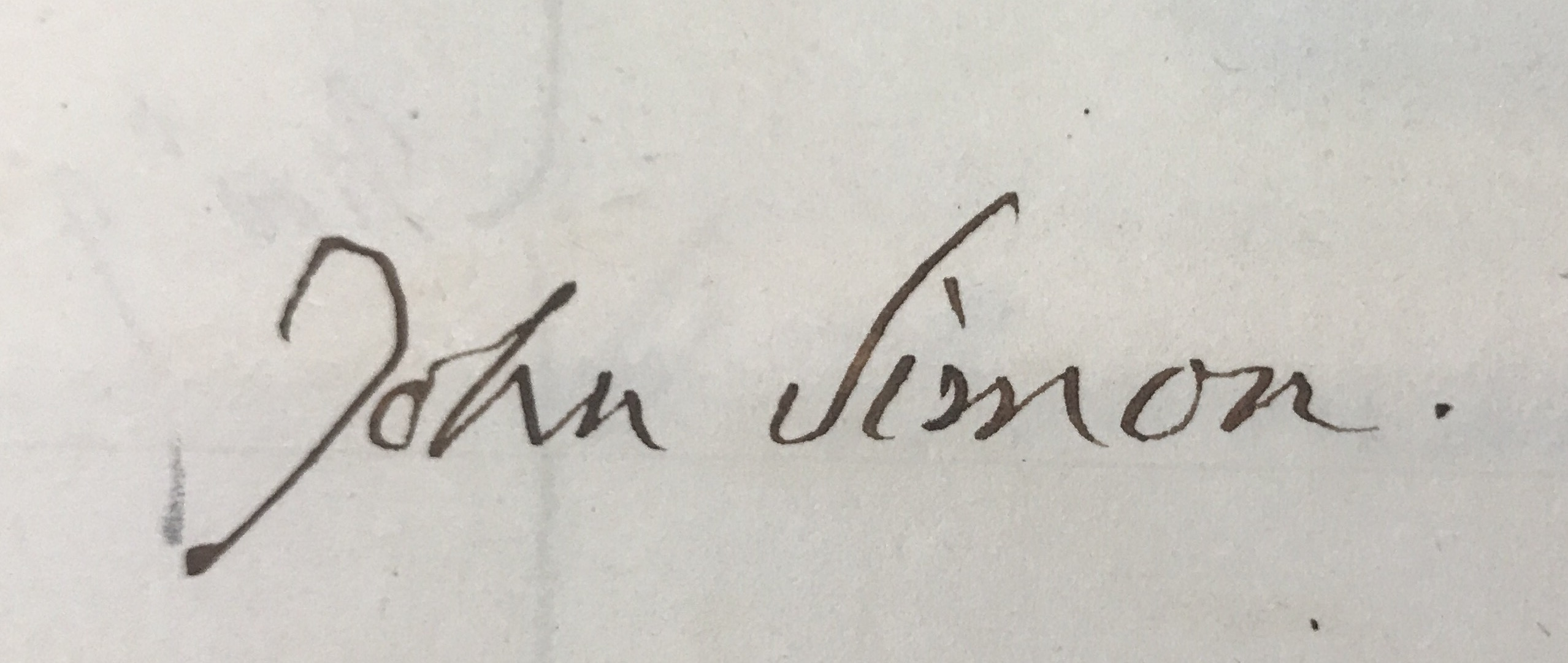

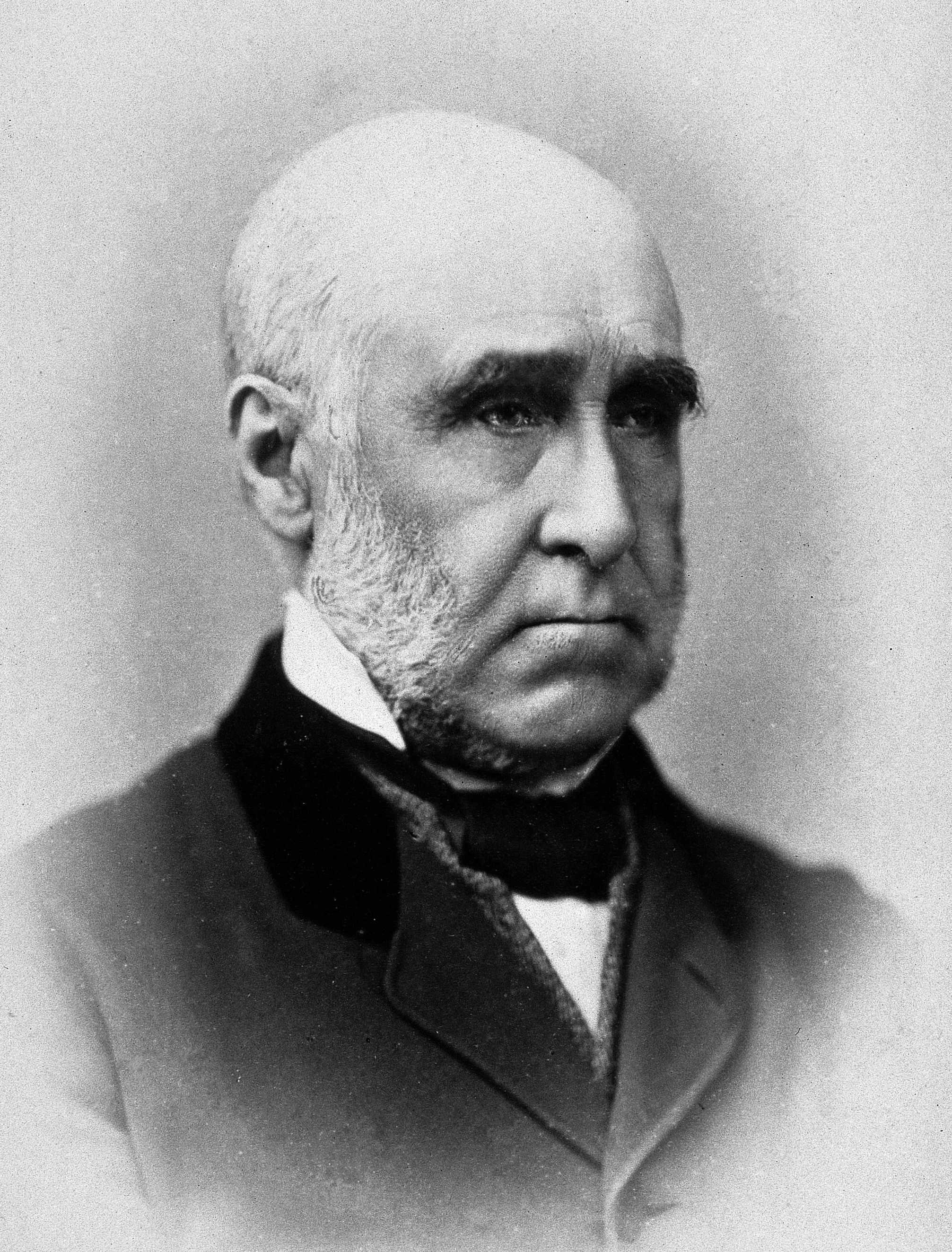
John Simon in 1881

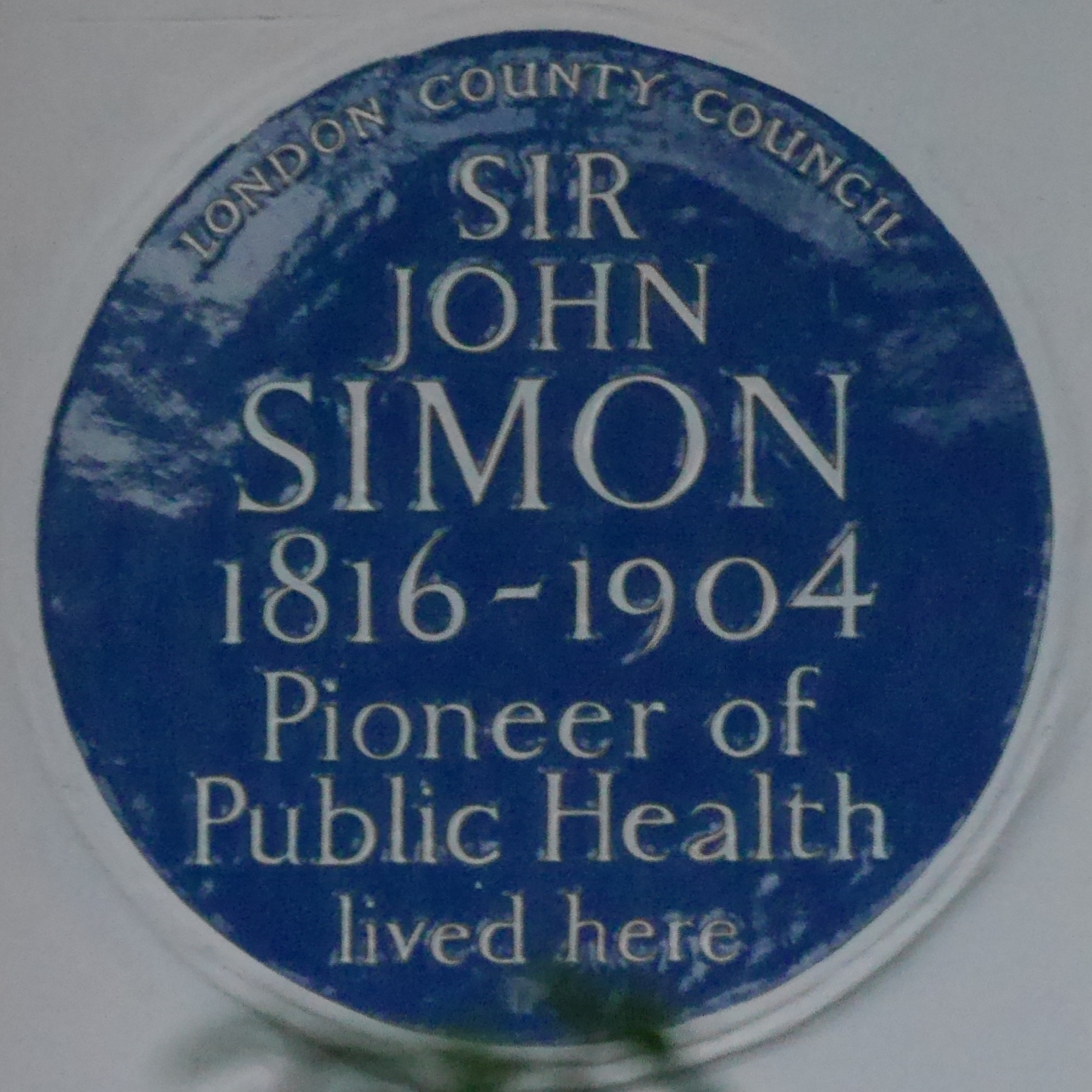
Blue plaque, 40 Kensington Square, Kensington, London

Sir John Simon KCB FRS FRCS (10 October 1816 – 23 July 1904) was an English pathologist, surgeon and public health officer. He was the first Chief Medical Officer for Her Majesty's Government from 1855 to 1876.

== Biography ==
John Simon was born in London to Louis Michael Simon, a stockbroker, and Mathilde (née Nonnet). He was the sixth of Louis' fourteen children by two marriages. His medical career began in 1833 when he became an apprentice to surgeon Joseph Henry Green and he was educated at King's College and St Thomas' Hospital in London. In 1838 he became a member of the Royal College of Surgeons. In 1845 he won the Astley Cooper Prize for an essay entitled "Physiological Essay on the Thymus Gland"; he was elected as a Fellow of the Royal Society (FRS) the same year.

In the mid-19th century, the government took measures to promote public health; the Public Health Act 1848 (11 & 12 Vict. c. 63) was passed and a General Board of Health was created. The same year, Simon was appointed the Medical Officer of Health for London for the City of London's commission of sewers; this was only the second health officer appointment in the country (William Henry Duncan had become Medical Officer for Health in Liverpool the previous year). He served in this position until 1855. The General Board of Health was reorganised in 1853, and Simon became the board's Chief Medical Officer in 1855. The General Board only lasted until 1858; on its dissolution, Simon's role as Chief Medical Officer transferred to the Privy Council.

From 1867 to 1869 he was President of the Pathological Society of London.

He married, in 1848, Jane O´Meara, daughter of Deputy Commissioner-General Matthew Delaval O´Meara. Lady Simon died aged 85 in London 19 August 1901.

Simon died on 23 July 1904 in London and was buried at Ladywell Cemetery in Lewisham.

== Recognition ==
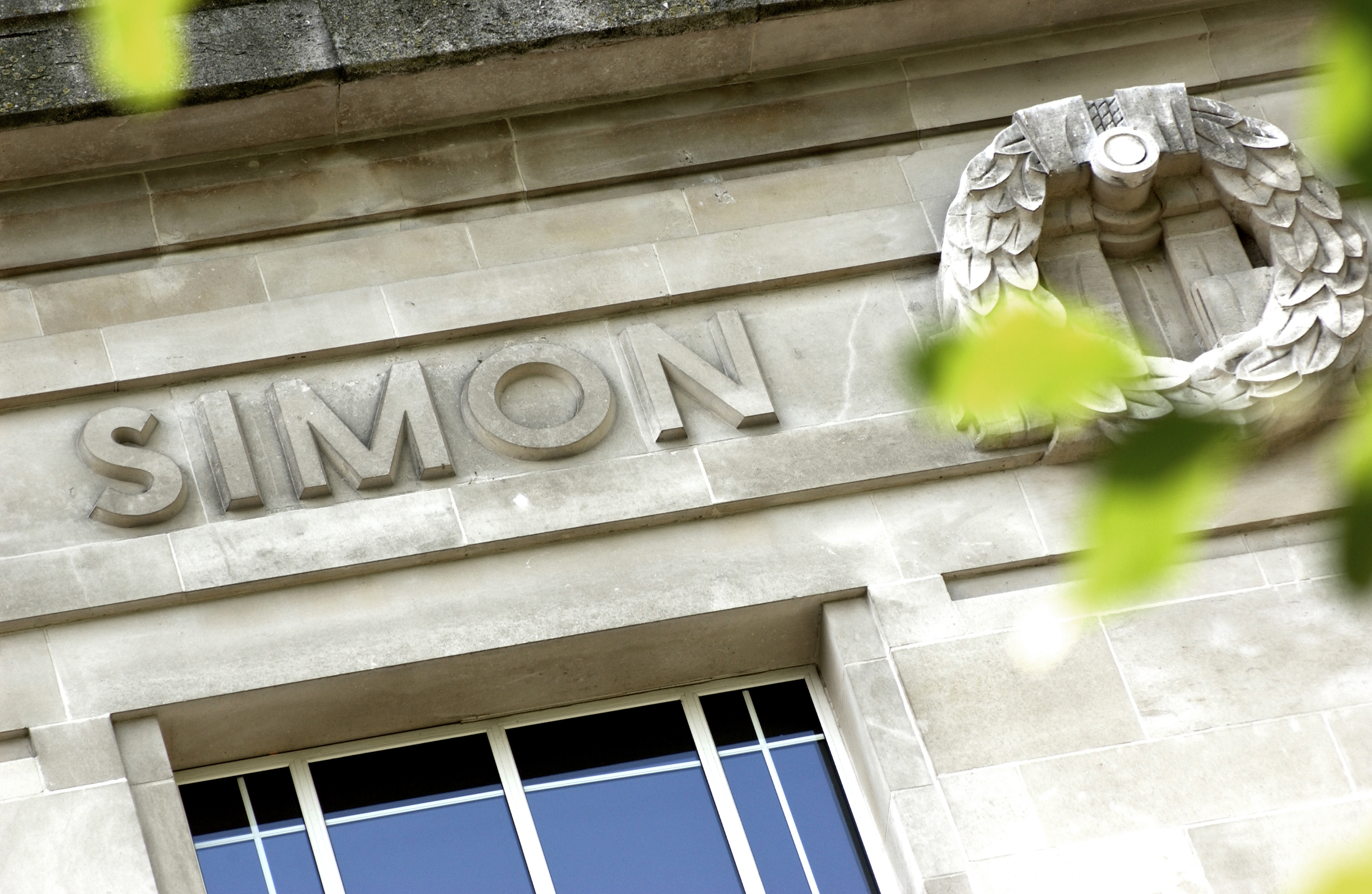
John Simon's name as it appears on the LSHTM Frieze

Simon's name features on the Frieze of the London School of Hygiene & Tropical Medicine. Twenty-three names of public health and tropical medicine pioneers were chosen to feature on the School building in Keppel Street when it was constructed in 1926.

== Publications ==
- English Sanitary Institutions, London: Cassell & company, 1890, OCLC 612812353

== See also ==
- History of public health in the United Kingdom
