= Meiklejohn =

Meiklejohn is a surname. Notable people with the surname include:

- Alexander Meiklejohn (1872–1964), philosopher, university administrator, and free-speech advocate
- Andrew Meiklejohn (1899–1970), Scottish respiratory physician
- David Meiklejohn (1900–1959), Scottish professional footballer
- George de Rue Meiklejohn (1857–1929), Nebraska Republican politician
- James Meiklejohn (born 1984), Australian rules footballer
- John Meiklejohn (1836–1902), Scottish academic
- John Meiklejohn (1841–1915), A founder of the Australian Inland Mission and the first Moderator-General of the Presbyterian Church of Australia.
- Maury Meiklejohn VC (1870–1913), a son of John Meiklejohn, British recipient of the Victoria Cross
- Arnold Meiklejohn (1874–1932), a son of John Meiklejohn, publisher and ornithologist
- M. F. M. Meiklejohn (Matthew Fontaine Maury Meiklejohn) (1913–1974), son of Arnold Meiklejohn, British professor of languages and ornithologist
- Ray Meiklejohn (born 1935), Canadian politician and educator
- William Hope Meiklejohn (1845–1909), British military commander during the siege of Malakand
- William Meiklejohn (1903–1981), Hollywood talent agent and scout in the 1920s through the 1940s

== See also ==
- Meiklejohn Civil Liberties Institute (MCLI) is a Berkeley, California-based non-profit corporation
- Meiklejohn Glacier, glacier flowing southwest from the Dyer Plateau of Palmer Land to George VI Sound
- Meiklejohn Stadium, ballpark in Philadelphia, Pennsylvania
