= Grade II* listed buildings in Rhondda Cynon Taf =

List of buildings in county borough of Wales

Rhondda Cynon Taf shown within Wales

Rhondda Cynon Taf is a county borough in South Wales. It is located to the north-west of Cardiff and covers an area of 424 km^{2} (164 sq mi). In 2021 the population was approximately 237,500.

In the United Kingdom, the term listed building refers to a building or other structure officially designated as being of special architectural, historical, or cultural significance. Listing was begun by a provision in the Town and Country Planning Act 1947. Once a building is listed, strict limitations are imposed on the modifications allowed to its structure or fittings and alterations require listed building consent. In Wales, authority for listing or delisting, under the Planning (Listed Buildings and Conservation Areas) Act 1990, rests with the Welsh Ministers, though these decisions are based on the recommendations of Cadw. There are around 30,000 listed buildings in Wales and these are categorised into three grades: Grade I (one), II* (two star) and II (two). Grade II* denotes "particularly important buildings of more than special interest" and makes up about seven per cent of the total number of listed buildings in Wales.

There are 36 Grade II* listed buildings in Rhondda Cynon Taf.

== Buildings ==
List of buildings
Name	Location Grid Ref. (Note: Sometimes known as OSGB36, the grid reference is based on the British national grid reference system used by the Ordnance Survey.) Geo-coordinates	Date Listed	Notes	Reference Number	Image
St Elvan's Church, Aberdare	Aberdare; SO0025602590; 51°42′47″N 3°26′42″W	14 September 1961	Church A Decorated Gothic aisled church built 1851–1852 to designs by Andrew Moseley and located in the centre of Aberdare. The church is set in a small churchyard and is notable for its fine interior and the 55 m (180 ft) four-stage tower and spire which makes it a prominent feature of the townscape. The chancel was decorated by Stephen Dykes Bower in 1961.	10841	See more images
St John the Baptist Parish Church, Aberdare	Aberdare; SN9999802668; 51°42′50″N 3°26′56″W	14 September 1961	Church A medieval church in an oval churchyard on the western edge of the town centre. The nave walls are of local Pennant Sandstone as is the southern doorway, datable c. 1300. The building has been extensively restored, with the chancel rebuilt in 1777 and enlarged 1871–1876. The western end has a bellcote, and a lancet window by John Petts.	10848	See more images
Tynewydd Farm House	Treherbert; SS9342598864; 51°40′42″N 3°32′34″W	23 March 1972	Farmhouse A large mid-17th-century farmhouse, set within a walled garden, on the south facing slope of the valley above the River Rhondda and Treherbert. The building has been dated 1652 by Cadw and 1623 by Coflein based on the porch sundial (which is marked '16[–]2'). It is notable for pre-dating the industrial and social development of the area and retains much of its original internal timberwork.	13115	Upload Photo
Ebenezer Welsh Independent Chapel	Tonypandy; SS9953292272; 51°37′13″N 3°27′09″W	22 May 1978	Chapel Built 1867–1868 at a cost of £1,000 (equivalent to £112,000 in 2023), and described by Cadw as "one of the finest chapels in the Rhondda". The main façade includes arched windows and an arcaded loggia between projecting turrets. The interior is galleried on four sides and lavishly decorated with fretwork panels. The organ, by Peter Conacher, was installed in 1892.	13117	See more images
Former Lewis Merthyr Colliery lamproom and fan house	Trehafod; ST0397991140; 51°36′39″N 3°23′17″W	16 August 1984	Lamproom and fan house The lamproom, a rubble Pennant Sandstone building with a Welsh slate roof, was originally designed as a turbine house but now contains lamp recharging racks. The attached fan house of brick and stone was added in the 1950s and houses an electric motor by David Brown and Sons and a Sirocco Fan. This superseded the Schiele fan in an earlier Fan House (Grade II listed: 13123).	13119	Former Lewis Merthyr Colliery lamproom and fan house
Former Lewis Merthyr Colliery Bertie pithead, headframe, tram circuit and tippler	Trehafod; ST0395791132; 51°36′39″N 3°23′18″W	16 August 1984	Pithead and headframe Built c. 1878 this is the oldest surviving headframe in Wales. The wrought iron lattice girder type headframe rises through the roof of the pit bank cover building; a superstructure of brick and corrugated metal upon a plinth of rubble sandstone. The shaft was used for downcast ventilation and coal production. Wagons were placed beneath a hopper into which coal was deposited by the steel A-frame tippler.	13120	Former Lewis Merthyr Colliery Bertie pithead, headframe, tram circuit and tippler
Former Lewis Merthyr Colliery Trefor pithead and headframe	Trehafod; ST0399491143; 51°36′39″N 3°23′16″W	16 August 1984	Pithead and headframe Built c. 1890 this is one of the oldest surviving headframes in Wales. The pit bank is of sandstone and brick above which is corrugated iron on a wrought iron frame through which rises the wrought iron lattice girder type headframe. The shaft was used for winding workers and materials and served as the upcast ventilation shaft. Heavy wooded guillotine gates and airlock doors remain in situ.	13121	Former Lewis Merthyr Colliery Trefor pithead and headframe
Former Lewis Merthyr Colliery Trefor winding engine house	Trehafod; ST0400391113; 51°36′38″N 3°23′16″W	16 August 1984	Engine house A Pennant Sandstone and brick building with a Welsh slate roof constructed in 1890 and containing a contemporary twin horizontal steam winding engine. Alterations were made to the fenestration of the northern elevation in the early 20th century with the extant winding drum being installed c. 1902 at the same time as the shaft was deepened. In 1956 the engine was converted for use with compressed air.	13122	Former Lewis Merthyr Colliery Trefor winding engine house
Former Lewis Merthyr Colliery Bertie winding engine house	Trehafod; ST0396391100; 51°36′38″N 3°23′18″W	16 August 1984	Engine house A Pennant Sandstone and red brick building with a Welsh slate roof constructed in 1878 with later alterations, notably to its windows. A steam winding engine was replaced in 1961 with an electric winding engine which powers the winding drum installed in 1920. As part of the Rhondda Heritage Park the building is used for audio visual displays.	13124	Former Lewis Merthyr Colliery Bertie winding engine house
St Peter's Parish Church	Pentre; SS9695196179; 51°39′18″N 3°29′28″W	9 December 1991	Church Known as the "Cathedral of the Rhondda" this Early English style church was built 1887–1890. It has a tall four-stage bell-tower and is located in a sloping rectangular churchyard. It was commissioned by Griffith Llewellyn, a co-founder of the Rhondda Engine Works, and designed by F. R. Kempson and Fowler (Note: The Cadw listing names J. B. Fowler, the Biographical Dictionary of Architects in Canada gives C. B. Fowler, Newman mentions only Kempson.) at a cost of £20,000 (equivalent to £2,809,000 in 2023). The church interior, and the external dressings, make use of contrasting pink and buff-coloured brick and Pennant Sandstone to create a simple banded polychromy.	13126	See more images
Bethesda Welsh Independent Chapel	Ton Pentre; SS9709695376; 51°38′52″N 3°29′19″W	30 June 1993	Chapel Built 1906–1907 in Baroque style to the designs of W. D. Morgan at a cost of £4,300 (equivalent to £584,000 in 2023). The seven-bay façade makes use of buff stone, red, and dark green sandstone and has a pediment with pilasters over the three central bays. The interior is galleried on four sides and has a Norman and Beard organ built in 1914.	13128	See more images
Llanharan House	Llanharan; ST0072283221; 51°32′21″N 3°25′58″W	22 February 1963	House A large Georgian country house set within a small Grade II registered landscape park 0.8 km (0.5 miles) east of Llanharan village. It was built c. 1750 and has been extended and remodelled several times. The central three-storey block is flanked by wings, one of two storeys, the other of three, but both fenestrated to the front on two storeys to produce a symmetrical façade.	13156	See more images
Castellau House	Llantrisant; ST0505986523; 51°34′10″N 3°22′17″W	28 August 1977	House Located on a lane that runs north from Castellau toward Pontypridd, this large 17th-century house was the home of Edmund Traheme, the mayor of Llantrisant in 1630. A descendant of the same name remodelled the house in Regency style in c. 1800. Later changes include the addition of a west wing and the lengthening of the east wing. In some sources it is referred to as "Castella".	13503	Upload Photo
Former Casting House and Workshop at Treforest Tinplate Works	Treforest, Pontypridd; ST0867188196; 51°35′07″N 3°19′11″W	27 October 1980	Casting house The structure consists of two single-storey ranges of Pennant Sandstone with wrought iron roof trusses that were built as part of the c. 1854 expansion of the tinworks. The northern range had an asbestos-cement roof and the southern range a slate roof, though little of it remains. Numerous alterations have been made including changing the position of doors and the addition of a lean-to along the west side.	13506	Upload Photo
Workshop NW of Tinning House at Treforest Tinplate Works	Treforest, Pontypridd; ST0866788155; 51°35′05″N 3°19′11″W	27 October 1980	Workshop This single-storey building of Pennant Sandstone with brick dressings and an asbestos-cement roof was constructed during the expansion of the site c. 1854. Although the original function of the building is unclear, it is important in forming part of the larger group at Treforest and is representative of the wider growth of the tinplate manufacturing industry that took place in South Wales in the 1850s.	13507	Upload Photo
Former Tinning House at Treforest Tinplate Works	Treforest, Pontypridd; ST0870388101; 51°35′04″N 3°19′09″W	27 October 1980	Tinning house A Pennant Sandstone and brick structure with wrought iron roof trusses built c. 1854. The two parallel wings once had a railway running between them. The final stages of tinplate production took place in this building. The larger east wing had twelve tinning bays where iron sheets were submerged in baths of molten tin. The building also had work areas where the tinplate was sorted, scoured and packed for dispatch.	13508	Former Tinning House at Treforest Tinplate Works
Former Smithy at Treforest Tinplate Works	Treforest, Pontypridd; ST0876887987; 51°35′00″N 3°19′05″W	27 October 1980	Smithy Built c. 1854 as part of major expansion at the Treforest site it is the last remaining example of the iron-framed structures that were once common in the ironworking forges of South Wales. Asbestos roof and cladding covered the brick walls and the cast iron frame of uprights spanned by segmental braces. The iron castings appear to be standard pre-fabricated components; the circular holes in the spandrels are a common feature of industrial buildings connected to the Crawshaw family.	13509	Upload Photo
Former Rolling Mill at Treforest Tinplate Works	Treforest, Pontypridd; ST0871887961; 51°34′59″N 3°19′08″W	27 October 1980	Rolling mill Dated 1835, this is earliest surviving building of the tinplate works. This 150 m (500 ft) long Pennant Sandstone range was where iron was rolled into thin sheets. The building had 33 bays on its west wall through which 7 iron launders carried water from the leat to the water-balance hammers and waterwheels. The south end is of 3 bays and the north end, originally of 2 bays, is thought to have been extended to match during the expansion of the site c. 1854.	13510	Former Rolling Mill at Treforest Tinplate Works
Talygarn	Pont-y-Clun; ST0317080046; 51°30′40″N 3°23′48″W	30 January 1981	House Talygarn is large country house set in extensive grounds. G. T. Clark, an industrialist and antiquary, purchased the estate in 1865 and had a mansion built to his own designs incorporated the existing house as its south-east wing. Cadw describes the house as "exceptional for the opulence of its internal fixtures and fittings". In 1922 the family sold the estate and it became a convalescent home for injured miners. It was converted into apartments in the early 21st century.	13511	Talygarn
Municipal Buildings, Pontypridd	Pontypridd; ST0724390394; 51°36′17″N 3°20′27″W	17 January 1990	Offices A civic building designed by Henry Hare and located to the north-west of the town centre. It was built 1903–1904 in Baroque style and retains its original interiors. Grey-green sandstone is used throughout and it has a slate roof, gable parapets, and an octagonal timber bellcote with weathervane. The main entrance and flanking windows are recessed behind three semi-circular arches.	13532	See more images
Cwm Coke Works Northern Cooling Tower	Llantwit Fardre; ST0658586115; 51°33′58″N 3°20′57″W	24 November 1993	Cooling tower One of a pair of wooden structures built in 1957 when Cwm Coke Works was established to produce coke from the coal mined at Cwm Colliery. Earlier wooden cooling towers were being replaced by concrete from the 1920s onwards making it particular unusual for these, a type invented in Germany in 1894, to be to have been built at such a late date.	13537	Cwm Coke Works Northern Cooling Tower
Cwm Coke Works Southern Cooling Tower	Llantwit Fardre; ST0658486095; 51°33′58″N 3°20′57″W	24 November 1993	Cooling tower The smaller of a pair of wooden structures at the Cwm Coke Works which closed in 2002/3. Proposed redevelopment of the site in 2014 included retaining the cooling towers which were listed due to their exceptional rarity, however the southern tower has since collapsed.	13538	Cwm Coke Works Southern Cooling Tower
Evan Howells Butchers Shop	Porth; ST0271091207; 51°36′41″N 3°24′23″W	8 January 1996	Shop Part of the former Thomas and Evans store built in 1905 and situated on Hannah Street in the centre of Porth. The building consisted of four purpose-built and fitted ground-floor shops, above which the offices were located. All are listed (22, 23 and 25 are Grade II) but this shop is Grade II* because of its "exceptionally complete, tiled, butcher's shop interior".	17115	Upload Photo
Ysgoldy Ebenezer attached to left of Ebenezer Welsh Independent Chapel	Tonypandy; SS9953692256; 51°37′13″N 3°27′09″W	22 May 1978	Schoolhouse A former Sunday School attached to the Ebenezer Chapel (also Grade II* listed: 13117). With the main chapel having fallen into disuse by 1996, and undergoing restoration as of 2017, this building is used as a chapel.	17332	Ysgoldy Ebenezer attached to left of Ebenezer Welsh Independent Chapel
Park and Dare Workmen's Institute and Hall	Treorchy; SS9590096659; 51°39′33″N 3°30′23″W	20 December 1996	Theatre Built in two phases and located close to the railway station on the south-west bank of the River Rhondda. The earlier part, with its frontage on Station Road, was built in 1892 by Jacob Rees in Tudor style as a Miners' institute and library. In 1912–1913 the theatre was added, with its frontage, a grand four-storey classical composition, on Dyfodwg Street.	18064	See more images
Elim Pentecostal Church, Mountain Ash	Mountain Ash; ST0474299063; 51°40′56″N 3°22′45″W	18 February 1999	Church Built in 1905, it has a bowed gable front between side towers. The interior is noted for its "exceptional continuous oval gallery" and the plasterwork of the ornate ceiling. It became a Pentecostal church in the mid-20th century, before which Cadw notes it as having been Welsh Baptist, Coflein and the National Library of Wales as Calvinistic Methodist. Its older name, "Noddfa", is incised above the ground floor cornice.	21372	Elim Pentecostal Church, Mountain Ash
Church of St Illtyd, St Gwynno and St Dyfodwg	Llantrisant; ST0464083425; 51°32′30″N 3°22′35″W	18 August 2000	Church This substantial Norman church replaced a 7th-9th century church on the site. The massive two-stage tower was built in the 15th century and has a three-stage polygonal turret on its north-east corner. Also from this period is the octagonal font which Newman describes as "an exceptional piece". A number of the stained glass windows were created as memorials including the east window by Morris & Co. commissioned by John Pritchard during his restoration of 1872–74 in which the entire interior was transformed.	23942	See more images
Church of St Michael and All Angels	Beddau; ST0591184994; 51°33′20″N 3°21′26″W	18 August 2000	Church When built in 1936 it would have been set in a rural context, but has since been surrounded by housing. It is rendered white with a slate roof and a heightened section at the east end which is stepped in four times towards a narrow east gable end. At each end of the church there is a circular window containing a five-pointed star, whereas the sides have pentagonal, star-shaped and tall narrow windows.	23944	See more images
Memorial to Evan and James James at Ynysangharad Park	Pontypridd; ST0754590141; 51°36′09″N 3°20′11″W	26 February 2001	Memorial Two bronze sculptures by Goscombe John on a base of Pennant Sandstone. It was erected in 1930 to commemorate Evan James and his son James James, composers of Hen Wlad Fy Nhadau (Land of my Fathers). They are depicted on a bronze tablet as low relief portrait busts. The figures of a man holding a harp, and a woman, both in Celtic robes, represent music and poetry.	24841	See more images
Taff Vale Railway Viaduct over Mill Street including masonry weir	Pontypridd; ST0704990068; 51°36′06″N 3°20′37″W	26 February 2001	Bridge This stone viaduct was the site, in 1837, of the ceremonial laying of the first stone of the Taff Vale Railway, for which Isambard Kingdom Brunel was the chief engineer. The bridge, spanning 33.5 m (110 ft) over the River Rhondda at Pontypridd, was built wide enough to carry the single-track line connecting Merthyr Tydfil and Cardiff. A separately constructed viaduct abutting it was added c. 1861 to carry the additional track required when the route was widened.	24845	See more images
White Bridge, Pontypridd	Pontypridd; ST0774991043; 51°36′38″N 3°20′01″W	26 February 2001	Bridge Built in 1907 on the site of an earlier bridge spanning the River Taff 0.7 km (0.4 mi) north of Pontypridd Bridge. It was designed by P. R. A. Willoughby in association with L. G. Mouchel & Partners and has a single arch of 35 m (115 ft) flanked by narrower round-headed arches. At the time of construction this was the longest reinforced concrete arch in Britain.	24848	White Bridge, Pontypridd
Church of St Catherine, Pontypridd	Pontypridd; ST071409015; 51°36′09″N 3°20′32″W	26 February 2001	Church Built 1866–1870 by John Norton with later additions including the north aisle (1885), a north vestry (1915) and the west porch (1933). The church has a polychrome brickwork interior of red patterned with black and with buff stone banding, though the chancel was modified by Giles Gilbert Scott in 1919. The four-stage tower and spire, to which clock-faces were attached in 1890 during renovations by Kempson and Fowler, is a prominent feature of the townscape.	24860	See more images
Fan House at Hetty Shaft	Hopkinstown, Pontypridd; ST0545090910; 51°36′33″N 3°22′00″W	8 March 1984	Fan house The Hetty Shaft was sunk in 1875 and was used as an emergency shaft for the Tymawr and Lewis Merthyr collieries from 1923 to 1983. The stone-built single-storey fan house, which was rebuilt c. 1950 in traditional industrial style, retains a Sirocco fan in situ. It is located on the west side of the engine house, and is part of the Hetty Pit scheduled monument.	24871	Fan House at Hetty Shaft
Leat Retaining Wall at Treforest Tinplate Works	Treforest, Pontypridd; ST0871087950; 51°34′59″N 3°19′08″W	27 October 1980	Wall An ashlar slab, engraved 'WC 1835 Perseverance' (WC for William Crayshaw), is set above the large stone retaining wall of the leat, or millstream. The leat, running parallel to the west side of the rolling mill supplied water for its waterwheels by means of the feeder which incorporated a series of 7 sluices, though all of these have since been bricked up.	24882	Upload Photo
Machine Bridge, Pontypridd	Treforest, Pontypridd; ST0839489287; 51°35′42″N 3°19′26″W	26 February 2001	Bridge Also known as pont y doctor (doctor's bridge), it was built in 1809 by Dr Richard Griffiths as part of a 8 km (5 miles) tramway to transport coal across the River Taff to the Glamorganshire Canal. It was widened c. 1910 using reinforced concrete with the original piers and arches being left intact. These are thought to form the world’s earliest surviving multi-arched railway bridge.	24912	Machine Bridge, Pontypridd
Llwydcoed Crematorium	Llwydcoed; 51°44′55″N 3°27′29″W	16 March 2007	Crematorium Built 1969–70 and set within extensive landscaped grounds. It was the Wales winner of the RIBA Architecture Awards in 1971. The four asymmetrical main blocks are linked by covered courtyards with flat roofs. The predominant materials throughout are white roughcast walls on natural stone plinths with pine boarded ceilings. The blocks, which contain the chapels and crematory, have steep roofs of Ffestiniog slate which, the RIBA awards noted, "echo the shape of the local landscape" and Newman describes as "forming a fractured pyramid".	87523	Llwydcoed Crematorium

== See also ==
- List of scheduled monuments in Rhondda Cynon Taf
- Grade I listed buildings in Rhondda Cynon Taf
- Registered historic parks and gardens in Rhondda Cynon Taf
