= List of scheduled monuments in Rhondda Cynon Taf =

Rhondda Cynon Taf is a county borough in South Wales. It has 89 scheduled monuments, seven of which cross or are on a border with a neighbouring authority. Of the 54 prehistoric sites, 40 are burial sites, with four hillforts and ten domestic and hut circle sites. There are three Roman sites, all military in purpose, and a variety of medieval mottes, churches, houses and a bridge. The 17 post-medieval sites are various forms of industrial and transport-related sites.

Scheduled monuments have statutory protection. The compilation of the list is undertaken by Cadw Welsh Historic Monuments, which is an executive agency of the National Assembly of Wales. The list of scheduled monuments below is supplied by Cadw with additional material from RCAHMW and Glamorgan-Gwent Archaeological Trust.

== Scheduled monuments in Rhondda Cynon Taf ==
Image	Name	Site type	Community	Location	Details	Historic County	Period	SAM No & Refs
	Brynbychan Round Cairn	Round cairn	Mountain Ash, (also Merthyr Vale), (see also Merthyr Tydfil)	51.6812°N 3.3564°W, ST063989	A turf-covered mound on the top of the ridge, close to a trig-point and radio mast. The monument sits on the border between Rhondda Cynon Taf and Merthyr Tydfil	Glamorganshire	Prehistoric	GM286
	The Beacons Round Barrows	Round barrow	Llanharan	51.5461°N 3.4189°W, ST017839		Glamorganshire	Prehistoric	GM280
	Two Round Barrows, Naboth's Vineyard	Round barrow	Llanharry	51.5163°N 3.4319°W, ST007806		Glamorganshire	Prehistoric	GM346
	Rhos-Gwawr cairn cemetery	Round cairn	Aberaman	51.6968°N 3.4561°W, SN994007		Glamorganshire	Prehistoric	GM404
	Carn Pentyle-Hir & Adjacent Round Cairn	Round cairn	Aberdare	51.7378°N 3.4203°W, SO020052		Glamorganshire	Prehistoric	GM402
	Garn Las Earthwork	Round cairn	Aberdare, (also Troed-y-rhiw), (see also Merthyr Tydfil)	51.7248°N 3.4073°W, SO028038		Glamorganshire	Prehistoric	GM236
	Ring Cairn South of Twyn Blaennant	Round cairn	Aberdare	51.7297°N 3.4125°W, SO025043		Glamorganshire	Prehistoric	GM368
	Darren Fawr Round Cairns	Round cairn	Cwmbach	51.7121°N 3.4002°W, SO033024		Glamorganshire	Prehistoric	GM287
	Graig-y-Gilfach round cairn and earthwork	Round barrow	Cwmbach	51.7206°N 3.4056°W, SO030033		Glamorganshire	Prehistoric	GM288
	Carn-y-Pigwn Round Cairn	Round cairn	Ferndale	51.6668°N 3.4302°W, ST011974		Glamorganshire	Prehistoric	GM372
	Mynydd Ty'n-tyle cairns	Round cairn	Ferndale	51.6565°N 3.4573°W, SS992963		Glamorganshire	Prehistoric	GM574
	Tarren Maerdy Cairn (W)	Round cairn	Ferndale	51.6642°N 3.482°W, SS979972		Glamorganshire	Prehistoric	GM576
	Cadair Fawr Round Cairn	Round cairn	Hirwaun	51.7992°N 3.4844°W, SN977122	A large cairn, 9m across, near the summit of Cadair Fawr (also sometimes called Cader Fawr).	Brecknockshire	Prehistoric	BR135
	Cefn Sychbant Round Cairns	Round cairn	Hirwaun	51.7873°N 3.4755°W, SN983108		Brecknockshire	Prehistoric	BR137
	Cefn Sychbant, round cairns to the S of	Round cairn	Hirwaun	51.7808°N 3.4661°W, SN989101		Glamorganshire	Prehistoric	GM560
	Four Round Cairns on Mynydd-y-Glog	Round cairn	Hirwaun	51.7694°N 3.489°W, SN973089		Glamorganshire	Prehistoric	GM522
	Nant-Maden Round Cairn	Round cairn	Hirwaun	51.7845°N 3.4933°W, SN970105		Brecknockshire	Prehistoric	BR156
	Onllwyn Round Cairn	Round cairn	Hirwaun	51.7718°N 3.4566°W, SN995091		Glamorganshire	Prehistoric	GM530
	Pant Sychbant Round Cairn and Earthworks	Round cairn	Hirwaun	51.7781°N 3.4574°W, SN995098		Brecknockshire	Prehistoric	BR166
	Penmoelallt Round Barrows	Round barrow	Hirwaun	51.7761°N 3.4385°W, SO008095		Glamorganshire	Prehistoric	GM528
	Round Cairn and Ring Cairn South of Twyn-y-Glog	Round cairn	Hirwaun	51.7681°N 3.5083°W, SN960087		Glamorganshire	Prehistoric	GM523
	Round Cairn North of Mynydd-y-Glog	Round cairn	Hirwaun	51.7733°N 3.4958°W, SN968093		Glamorganshire	Prehistoric	GM521
	Tarren y Bwlch round cairn	Round cairn	Hirwaun	51.7194°N 3.5241°W, SN948033		Glamorganshire	Prehistoric	GM565
	Three Round Cairns on the Southern Side of Mynydd-y-Glog	Round cairn	Hirwaun	51.7661°N 3.481°W, SN978085		Glamorganshire	Prehistoric	GM525
	Two Round Cairns at Onllwyn	Round cairn	Hirwaun	51.7761°N 3.4489°W, SO001095		Glamorganshire	Prehistoric	GM529
	Two Round Cairns on the Summit of Mynydd-y-Glog	Round cairn	Hirwaun	51.7677°N 3.4845°W, SN976087		Glamorganshire	Prehistoric	GM526
	Twyn Bryn Glas round cairn	Round cairn	Hirwaun	51.7943°N 3.4732°W, SN984116		Glamorganshire	Prehistoric	GM561
	Wernlas ring cairn and cairnfield	Ring cairn	Hirwaun	51.7778°N 3.4967°W, SN968098		Glamorganshire	Prehistoric	GM558
	Mynydd Maendy Round Cairn	Round cairn	Llanharan	51.5642°N 3.4713°W, SS981860		Glamorganshire	Prehistoric	GM294
	Garn Bica	Round cairn	Maerdy	51.6933°N 3.5314°W, SN942005		Glamorganshire	Prehistoric	GM539
	Ring Cairn 350m W of Penrhiw Caradoc, Llanwonno	Round cairn	Mountain Ash	51.6723°N 3.3863°W, ST042979		Glamorganshire	Prehistoric	GM373
	Mynydd Ton Cairns	Round cairn	Pentre	51.6345°N 3.5215°W, SS947939		Glamorganshire	Prehistoric	GM540
	Tarren Maerdy cairn (E)	Round cairn	Pentre	51.6633°N 3.4754°W, SS980970		Glamorganshire	Prehistoric	GM575
	Craig y Bwlch round cairn	Round cairn	Rhigos	51.7206°N 3.5332°W, SN941035		Glamorganshire	Prehistoric	GM564
	Rhondda Fach Cairn	Round cairn	Rhigos	51.7094°N 3.527°W, SN945022		Glamorganshire	Prehistoric	GM541
	Bachgen Carreg Round Cairn	Round cairn	Treherbert	51.671°N 3.5804°W, SS908981		Glamorganshire	Prehistoric	GM234
	Crug yr Afan Round Cairn	Round cairn	Treorchy	51.6474°N 3.5618°W, SS920954		Glamorganshire	Prehistoric	GM233
	Carn-y-Wiwer Cairnfield & Platform Houses	Cairnfield	Ynyshir	51.6376°N 3.4077°W, ST026941		Glamorganshire	Prehistoric	GM323
	Mynydd y Gelli Kerb Cairn	Kerb cairn	Ystrad	51.6353°N 3.4815°W, SS975939		Glamorganshire	Prehistoric	GM354
	Gwersyll	Enclosure	Aberdare	51.7266°N 3.4102°W, SO026040		Glamorganshire	Prehistoric	GM239
	Craig y Ddinas Hillfort	Hillfort	Hirwaun	51.761°N 3.5729°W, SN915080		Brecknockshire	Prehistoric	BR178
	Cwm Cadlan Settlement and Field System	Hut Circle	Hirwaun	51.7889°N 3.4823°W, SN978110		Brecknockshire	Prehistoric	BR414
	Pant-y-Gadair Hut Circle Settlement	Hut Circle	Hirwaun	51.8049°N 3.4719°W, SN986128	Hut circle 6m acrioss, with walls of unworked limestone, on the north slopes of Cadair Fawr.	Brecknockshire	Prehistoric	BR413
	Ring Cairn and Round Cairn on Southern Side of Mynydd-y-Glog	Ring cairn	Hirwaun	51.7612°N 3.4886°W, SN973079		Glamorganshire	Prehistoric	GM524
	Wernlas hut circle	Hut circle settlement	Hirwaun	51.7749°N 3.5022°W, SN964095		Glamorganshire	Prehistoric	GM562
	Rhiw Season Caerau	Hillfort	Llantrisant	51.5397°N 3.3501°W, ST064831		Glamorganshire	Prehistoric	GM065
	Hut Circles & Enclosures on Buarth Maen	Unenclosed hut circle	Llwydcoed	51.7379°N 3.4307°W, SO013053		Glamorganshire	Prehistoric	GM401
	Caer Gwanaf	Enclosure	Pont-y-clun	51.5112°N 3.3738°W, ST047800		Glamorganshire	Prehistoric	GM070
	Ring Cairn and Two Standing Stones on Coedpenmaen Common	Ring cairn	Pontypridd	51.6036°N 3.33°W, ST079902		Glamorganshire	Prehistoric	GM510
	Lle'r Gaer	Hillfort	Tonyrefail	51.5742°N 3.3721°W, ST050870		Glamorganshire	Prehistoric	GM219
The remains of the Prehistoric settlement at Hen Drer Mynydd	Blaenrhondda settlement	Hut circle settlement	Treherbert	51.7052°N 3.5598°W, SN923018		Glamorganshire	Prehistoric	GM101
	Ffos Toncenglau cross ridge dyke	Cross Ridge Dyke	Treherbert	51.7129°N 3.5648°W, SN919027		Glamorganshire	Prehistoric	GM118
	Earthwork 360m NNE of Crug yr Avan	Enclosure	Treorchy	51.6506°N 3.5595°W, SS922957		Glamorganshire	Prehistoric	GM278
	Mynydd Maendy hillfort	Hillfort	Treorchy	51.6486°N 3.5086°W, ST957955		Glamorganshire	Prehistoric	GM099
	Twyn y Bridallt Roman Camp	Marching camp	Aberaman	51.6738°N 3.4448°W, ST001982		Glamorganshire	Roman	GM259
	Miskin Roman fort	Fort	Pont-y-clun	51.5179°N 3.3794°W, ST043807		Glamorganshire	Roman	GM591
	Pen-y-Coedcae Roman Camp	Marching camp	Pontypridd	51.5835°N 3.3481°W, ST069880		Glamorganshire	Roman	GM267
	Cross Ridge Dyke & Cairn on Twyn Hywel	Cross Ridge Dyke	Pontypridd, (also Aber Valley), (see also Caerphilly)	51.6116°N 3.3007°W, ST100911		Glamorganshire	Unknown	GM456
	Cross Ridge Dyke & Earthwork on Cefn Eglwysilan	Cross Ridge Dyke	Pontypridd	51.604°N 3.3013°W, ST099902		Glamorganshire	Unknown	GM452
	Bwlch y Clawdd Dyke	Linear earthwork	Treorchy, (also Ogmore Valley), (see also Bridgend)	51.6391°N 3.5331°W, SS940944		Glamorganshire	Unknown	GM500
	Cadair Fawr settlement	House platform	Hirwaun	51.7993°N 3.472°W, SN985122	A group of medieval or later house platforms east of the summit of Cadair Fawr.	Glamorganshire	Medieval	GM559
	Pant Sychbant Medieval Hamlet	Deserted Rural Settlement	Hirwaun	51.7759°N 3.4942°W, SN970096		Glamorganshire	Medieval	GM520
	Pant Sychbant Medieval House	Rectangular hut	Hirwaun	51.7774°N 3.4563°W, SN996097		Glamorganshire	Medieval	GM532
	Gadlys	Moated Site	Llanharan	51.5199°N 3.473°W, SS979811		Glamorganshire	Medieval	GM081
Llanilid Castle mound, taken stood on the east face facing west, raised earthen walls can be seen around the motte through the trees	Llanilid Castle Mound	Motte	Llanharan	51.5216°N 3.4748°W, SS977813		Glamorganshire	Medieval	GM080
St Peter's Church	St Peter's Church, Remains of	Church	Llanharan	51.5577°N 3.4536°W, SS993853		Glamorganshire	Medieval	GM338
The largest remaining structure of Llantrisant Castle	Llantrisant Castle	Castle	Llantrisant	51.5415°N 3.3748°W, ST047834		Glamorganshire	Medieval	GM074
	Tarren Deusant Sculptured Rock & Spring	Petrosomatoglyph	Llantrisant	51.5758°N 3.3694°W, ST052872		Glamorganshire	Medieval	GM406
	Tomen y Clawdd	Motte	Llantwit Fardre	51.5698°N 3.3121°W, ST091864		Glamorganshire	Medieval	GM064
	Castell Nos	Motte	Maerdy	51.6908°N 3.4989°W, SN964001		Glamorganshire	Medieval	GM408
St Ann's Church - Talygarn	Medieval Chapel of Talygarn	Chapel	Pont-y-clun	51.5118°N 3.4039°W, ST026801		Glamorganshire	Medieval	GM442
Pontypridd Bridge	Pontypridd Bridge	Bridge	Pontypridd	51.605°N 3.3382°W, ST074904		Glamorganshire	Medieval	GM015
	Glynneath Gunpowder Works	Industrial monument	Hirwaun, (also Ystradfellte), (see also Powys)	51.7658°N 3.5654°W, SN920086		Glamorganshire	Post-Medieval/Modern	BR230
	Y Garreg Siglo Bardic Complex	Unclassified site	Pontypridd	51.6022°N 3.3277°W, ST081901		Glamorganshire	Post-Medieval/Modern	GM507
	Ventilation Furnace, Trehafod	Building (Unclassified)	Porth	51.6118°N 3.3836°W, ST042912		Glamorganshire	Post-Medieval/Modern	GM437
	Remains of Iron Furnace at Cwmaman	Industrial monument	Aberaman	51.6848°N 3.4415°W, ST004994		Glamorganshire	Post-Medieval/Modern	GM266
	Gadlys Ironworks (Remains of Blast Furnace)	Ironworks	Aberdare	51.7167°N 3.4486°W, SO000029		Glamorganshire	Post-Medieval/Modern	GM438
	Gelli-Isaf Tramroad Bridge, Abernant Tramroad	Bridge	Aberdare	51.7288°N 3.4637°W, SN990043		Glamorganshire	Post-Medieval/Modern	GM411
	Iron Tram Bridge, Robertstown	Bridge	Aberdare	51.7224°N 3.4533°W, SN997036		Glamorganshire	Post-Medieval/Modern	GM347
	Remains of Gamlyn Railway Viaduct	Bridge	Aberdare	51.7336°N 3.4758°W, SN981049		Glamorganshire	Post-Medieval/Modern	GM533
	Tramroad East of Robert's Town Bridge, Aberdare	Tramway	Aberdare	51.7224°N 3.4495°W, SN999036		Glamorganshire	Post-Medieval/Modern	GM527
	Dinas Silica Mine	Tramroad	Hirwaun	51.7605°N 3.5708°W, SN916080		Brecknockshire	Post-Medieval/Modern	BR229
	Site of Hirwaun Ironworks	Industrial monument	Hirwaun	51.7414°N 3.5112°W, SN957058		Brecknockshire	Post-Medieval/Modern	BR157
	Pillow Mound at Bryn y Gwyddel	Pillow mound	Llwydcoed	51.7536°N 3.4397°W, SO007070		Glamorganshire	Post-Medieval/Modern	GM517
	Great Western Colliery	Pit	Pontypridd	51.6091°N 3.3666°W, ST054909		Glamorganshire	Post-Medieval/Modern	GM459
Beam engine in the grounds of University of Glamorgan	Newbridge Colliery Engine	Beam engine	Pontypridd	51.5881°N 3.3256°W, ST082885		Glamorganshire	Post-Medieval/Modern	GM457
	Nantgarw China Works & Museum, Nantgarw	Pottery kiln	Taffs Well	51.5614°N 3.2704°W, ST120854		Glamorganshire	Post-Medieval/Modern	GM335
	Incline Haulage Systems, Cefn Ynysfeio, Treherbert	Incline Drumhouse	Treherbert	51.674°N 3.5194°W, SS950983		Glamorganshire	Post-Medieval/Modern	GM508
	Locomotive Type Steam Boiler, Blaen Rhondda	Colliery	Treherbert	51.7021°N 3.5602°W, SN922015		Glamorganshire	Post-Medieval/Modern	GM509

Scheduled Monuments in Rhondda Cynon Taf, Wales.
=Prehistoric =Roman =Early Medieval
=Medieval =Post-Medieval/Modern

== See also ==
- List of Cadw properties
- List of castles in Wales
- List of hill forts in Wales
- Historic houses in Wales
- List of monastic houses in Wales
- List of museums in Wales
- List of Roman villas in Wales
- Grade I listed buildings in Rhondda Cynon Taff
- Grade II* listed buildings in Rhondda Cynon Taff
