= Lle'r Gaer =

- Location within Wales
- 51°34′26.76″N 3°22′19.56″W
- Type: Hillfort
- Periods: Iron Age
- Cultures: Celtic Britons
- Location: Near Tonyrefail, Rhondda Cynon Taf, Wales
- Region: Glamorgan

History
- Built: c. 800 BC – AD 74 (Iron Age)

Site notes
- Material: Earth and stone
- Condition: Well preserved
- Management: Cadw

Lle'r Gaer is a univallate Iron Age hillfort situated in the uplands near Tonyrefail, Rhondda Cynon Taf, Wales. This prehistoric fortified settlement represents a significant example of Later Iron Age defensive architecture within the former county of Glamorgan. The monument has been designated a scheduled monument under the provisions of the Ancient Monuments and Archaeological Areas Act 1979, administered by Cadw, and bears the unique Scheduled Ancient Monument reference GM219.

== Morphology and defensive characteristics ==
The hillfort exemplifies the contour fort typology prevalent throughout upland Wales during the Later Iron Age. Archaeological analysis indicates that the monument comprises the surviving earthwork remains of a fortified enclosure dating to the Iron Age period (c. 800 BC – AD 74), chronologically spanning the pre-Roman Iron Age through to the Roman conquest of Wales.

The defensive system consists of a single rampart constructed following the natural topographical contours of the hillside, characteristic of the broader tradition of Iron Age fortification across the British Isles. The rampart achieves its maximum elevation of 3 metres on the western approach to the site, demonstrating the sophisticated understanding of defensive topography employed by Iron Age communities. This construction methodology reflects the broader architectural traditions observed across contemporary hillfort sites throughout Wales, where defensive earthworks were engineered to maximise the natural advantages afforded by elevated terrain.

== Archaeological and historical context ==
Lle'r Gaer forms part of the extensive corpus of Iron Age hillforts documented across Britain and Ireland, a monument class that constituted the dominant settlement form during the first millennia BC and AD. The comprehensive Atlas of Hillforts of Britain and Ireland, compiled through collaborative research between the Universities of Oxford, Edinburgh, and University College Cork, documents 4,147 hillforts across the British Isles, establishing this monument type as amongst the most prolific archaeological legacies of prehistoric Britain.

Contemporary archaeological interpretation emphasises the multifunctional nature of hillfort sites, challenging earlier paradigms that prioritised purely military explanations for their construction and use. Hillforts functioned as complex socio-economic centres serving diverse roles including defence, communal assembly, ceremonial activities, craft production, and the control of regional trade networks. Their construction represented significant communal investment in both labour and resources, functioning as powerful symbols of territorial control and social identity within Iron Age landscapes.

The Iron Age in Wales, encompassing the period from approximately 800 BC to the Roman conquest of AD 74–78, witnessed profound transformations in settlement organisation, material culture, and social complexity. This period coincided with significant technological innovations, particularly in metallurgy, alongside evolving patterns of territorial organisation and the emergence of increasingly stratified societies. The proliferation of hillforts across the Welsh landscape during this period reflects these broader socio-political developments.

== Research significance and archaeological potential ==
The monument possesses considerable archaeological significance for advancing scholarly understanding of Later Iron Age settlement organisation and defensive strategies in Wales. Lle'r Gaer retains substantial archaeological potential, with strong probability for the preservation of stratigraphic evidence relating to construction chronology, architectural techniques, and the functional organisation of Iron Age communities. The site's well-preserved condition enhances its research value for future archaeological investigation and its contribution to regional Iron Age studies.

Within the context of Welsh prehistoric archaeology, Lle'r Gaer represents one element within a broader network of approximately 4,200 scheduled monuments administered by Cadw. The hillforts of Wales demonstrate remarkable morphological diversity, ranging from small univallate enclosures such as Lle'r Gaer to massive multivallate complexes exemplified by sites such as Tre'r Ceiri on the Llŷn Peninsula, which encompasses 2.5 hectares and represents one of the most architecturally sophisticated hillforts in north-western Europe.

== Regional archaeological landscape ==
Lle'r Gaer functions as one of four documented hillforts within Rhondda Cynon Taf, contributing to the county borough's substantial corpus of scheduled monuments. The monument is situated within the historic county of Glamorgan, a region characterised by exceptional density of Iron Age archaeological remains reflecting the strategic and economic significance of this territory during the prehistoric period.

The diversity observable within Welsh Iron Age settlements reflects both the varied topographical character of the Welsh landscape and the complex socio-economic organisation of prehistoric communities. This variability encompasses significant differences in size, defensive complexity, internal organisation, and landscape setting, suggesting considerable diversity in settlement function and the social structures of their occupying communities. Such variation provides crucial evidence for understanding the heterogeneous nature of Iron Age society in Wales and the adaptive strategies employed by prehistoric communities across different environmental and social contexts.

== Heritage management and statutory protection ==
As a scheduled monument, Lle'r Gaer receives statutory protection under the Ancient Monuments and Archaeological Areas Act 1979, reflecting its designation as an archaeological site of national importance. This legislative framework provides comprehensive protection against unauthorised disturbance or alteration, ensuring the preservation of the site's archaeological integrity for future research and public benefit.

== See also ==
- List of hillforts in Wales
- Iron Age Britain
- Celtic Britons
- Scheduled monuments in Wales
- List of scheduled monuments in Rhondda Cynon Taf
- Atlas of Hillforts of Britain and Ireland
