= Registered historic parks and gardens in Rhondda Cynon Taf =

List of buildings in county borough of Wales

Rhondda Cynon Taf shown within Wales

Rhondda Cynon Taf is a county borough in South Wales. It is located to the north-west of Cardiff and covers an area of 424 km^{2} (164 sq mi). In 2021 the population was approximately 237,500.

The Cadw/ICOMOS Register of Parks and Gardens of Special Historic Interest in Wales was established in 2002 and given statutory status in 2022. It is administered by Cadw, the historic environment agency of the Welsh Government. Elisabeth Whittle described Cadw as having a "somewhat special and guiding role" in the preservation of historic parks and gardens, since they are "an integral part of Welsh archaeological and architectural heritage". The register includes just under 400 sites, ranging from gardens of private houses, to cemeteries and public parks. Parks and gardens are listed at one of three grades, matching the grading system used for listed buildings. Grade I is the highest grade, for sites of exceptional interest; Grade II*, the next highest, denotes parks and gardens of great quality; while Grade II denotes sites of special interest.

There are five registered parks and gardens in Rhondda Cynon Taf. Two are listed at Grade II*, and three at Grade II. Two were constructed as public parks and the others are parks and gardens that were originally built around country houses.

== Key ==
| Grade | Criteria |
|---|---|
| I | Parks and gardens of exceptional interest |
| II* | Parks and gardens of great quality |
| II | Parks and gardens of special interest |

== List of parks and gardens ==
List of parks and gardens
| Name | Location Grid Ref. (Note: Sometimes known as OSGB36, the grid reference is based on the British national grid reference system used by the Ordnance Survey.) Geo-coordinates | Date Listed | Description / Notes | Grade | Reference Number | Image |
|---|---|---|---|---|---|---|
| Aberdare Park | Trecynon; SN9928603273; 51°43′07″N 3°27′29″W | 1 February 2022 | Public park Opened on 27 July 1869 and partly laid out by park and garden designer William Barron (1805–1891). A circuit walk surrounds a central grass area. The southern end of the park has sporting facilities, a boating lake, bandstand and pavilion. | II* | PGW(Gm)2(RCT) | a lake with trees in the background |
| Llanharan House | Llanharan; ST0068883244; 51°32′20″N 3°25′56″W | 1 February 2022 | Park, country house garden and kitchen garden The mid-eighteenth-century landscape park and parts of the garden were probably laid out when the present house was built, the terraced garden is nineteenth century. Listed buildings within the grounds include the house (Grade II*), the stables and the old laundry building (both Grade II). | II | PGW(Gm)16(RCT) | a grass lawn in front of a large house with trees in the background |
| Miskin Manor | Miskin; ST0532880546; 51°30′55″N 3°21′52″W | 1 February 2022 | Park, country house garden and kitchen garden A nineteenth-century landscape park with Victorian and Edwardian pleasure grounds and gardens and a walled kitchen garden. The manor house is listed (Grade II) as are several other structures including the terraces and statues of heraldic animals. | II | PGW(Gm)9(RCT) | a grass lawn in front of a large house |
| Talygarn | Pont-y-clun; ST0309679977; 51°30′36″N 3°23′47″W | 1 February 2022 | Park, country house garden and kitchen garden The layout is mainly the work of George Thomas Clark in the late nineteenth century and includes terraced gardens, a woodland garden and park with a lake and ornamental pond. There are several listed structures within the area including the house (Grade II*), stone benches in the sunken garden, and the terrace walls. | II* | PGW(Gm)8(RCT) | a pool covered with plants, there is a stone arch in the background |
| Ynysangharad Park | Pontypridd; ST0741790064; 51°36′05″N 3°20′13″W | 1 February 2022 | Public park Opened on 6 August 1923 as a war memorial park. Features within the park include a Grade II* listed monument commemorating Evan James and James James, composers of Hen Wlad Fy Nhadau (Land of my Fathers), a Grade II listed lido, and a cricket ground (Ynysangharad Park). | II | PGW(Gm)3(RCT) | two bronze statues on pedestals, against a background of trees |

== See also ==
- List of scheduled monuments in Rhondda Cynon Taf
- Grade I listed buildings in Rhondda Cynon Taf
- Grade II* listed buildings in Rhondda Cynon Taf
