= Treforest tinplate works =

Former industrial works in Wales

Coordinates: 51.583661°N 3.318807°W

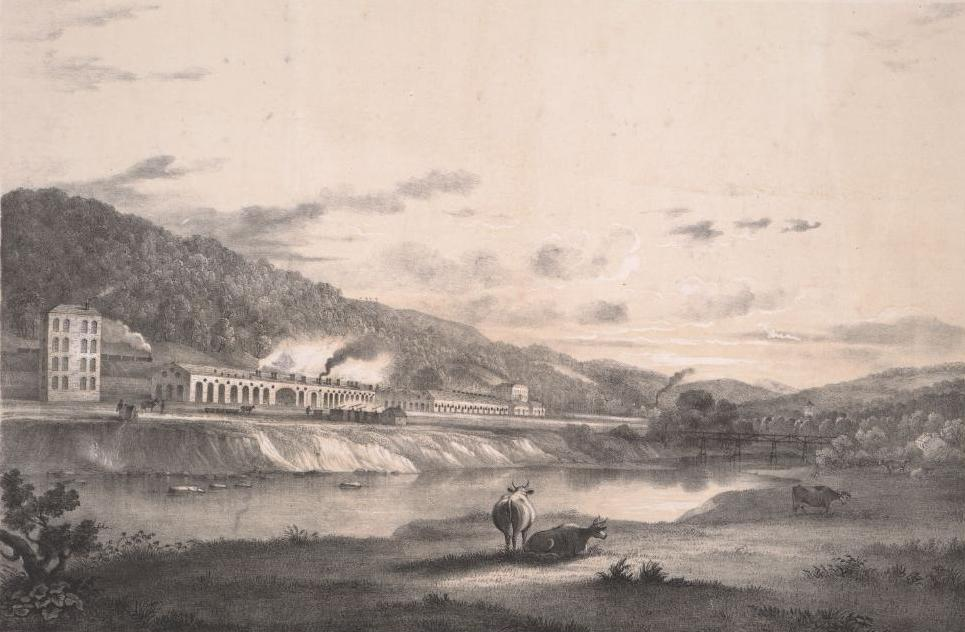
Treforest tinplate works c. 1840

The Treforest tinplate works in Treforest, Wales, operated between the late 18th century and 1939. The six remaining buildings on the site were constructed in the mid 19th century during which time the iron and tinplate industries were dominated by South Wales. These buildings form the best surviving group of tinplate manufacturing buildings in the region and are Grade II* listed.

== History ==
The tinplate works at Treforest was bought in 1794 by the ironmaster Richard Crawshay, owner the Cyfarthfa Ironworks at Merthyr Tydfil, before which time the works were not regarded as being particularly notable. William Crawshay II oversaw the redevelopment of the site in the 1830s during which time the surviving rolling mill building was constructed. By 1842 this housed two mills and numerous furnaces. A major expansion to the works c. 1854 saw the addition of the tinning house which had space for 12 furnaces. The Crawshays operated the works until 1866 after which it was acquired by a company whose proprietors included William Lewis, Edward Williams and Lowthian Bell. There were 5 mills in 1875 and this number had doubled by 1893. In 1895 the county medical officer, William Williams, noted the environmental impact of the tinplate works on the River Taff. The water supply, which was diverted from the river north of the works, was emptied back into it downstream having been contaminated with sulphuric acid and sulphate of iron which resulted in discolouration of the river and its banks. The works went into decline in the 20th century and in 1939, when production ceased, there were only 4 working mills. The last operator of the works was Richard Thomas & Co. In 1941 the Ministry of Supply requisitioned the works for storage, and by 1946 several buildings had been demolished as part of the Tinplate Redundancy Scheme, an initiative established to tackle disused tinplate works. The site then came under the ownership of the South Wales and Monmouthshire Trading Estate.

== Listed buildings ==
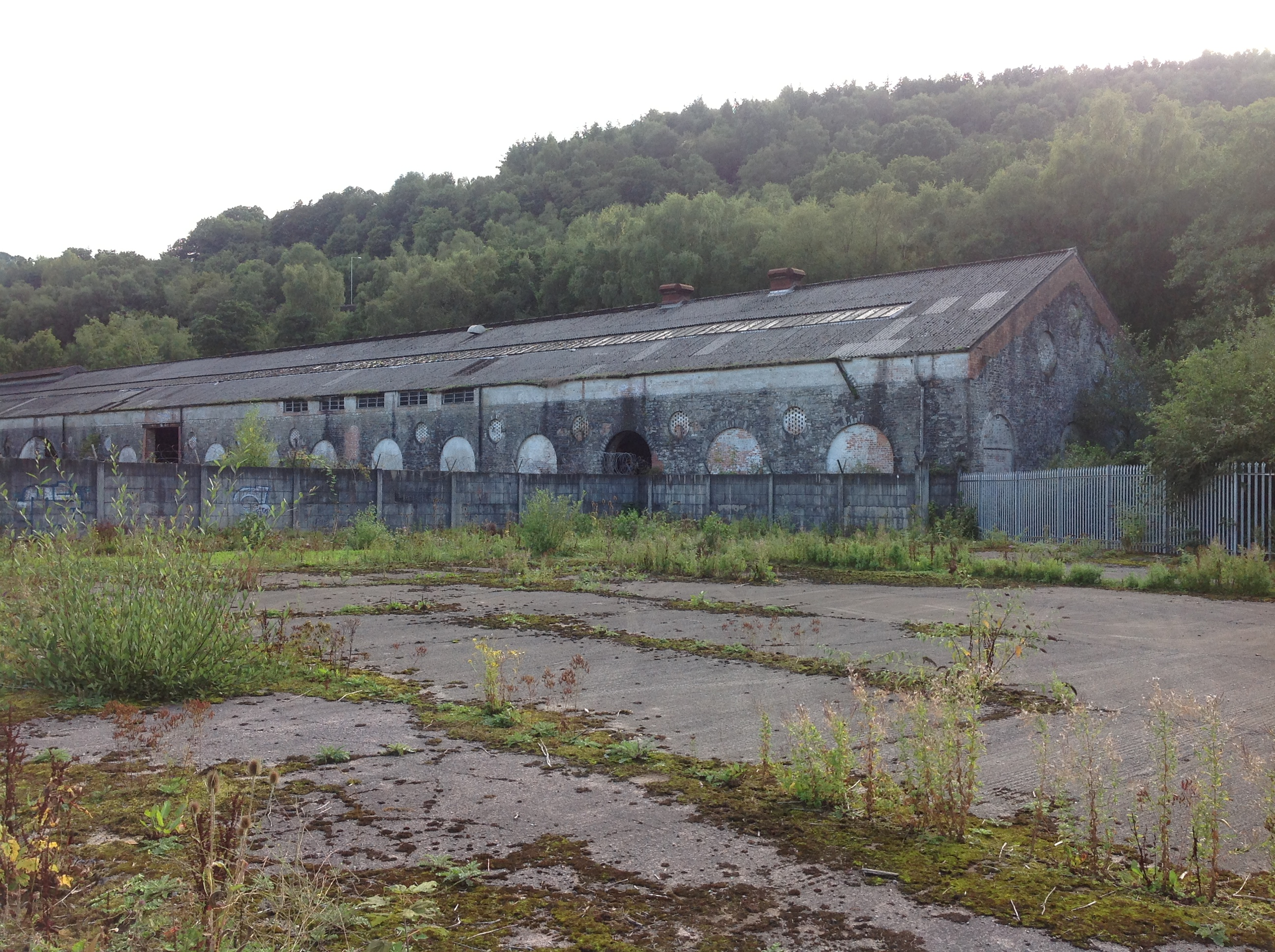
The rolling mill

There are six Grade II* listed buildings on the site. The oldest of these are the rolling mill and the retaining wall for the leat. An ashlar slab over the wall and a keystone at the south end of the mill date both of these to 1835. The 150 m (500 ft) long rolling mill is where bars of iron were transformed into thin sheets. The waterwheels that powered the machines were supplied with water by iron launders connected to the leat running parallel to the west side of the building. The other four listed buildings were built during the expansion of the 1850s. These are the smithy, a casting house and workshop, a workshop, and the tinning house. The final stages of the manufacturing process took place in the tinning house which was where the iron sheets were coated of molten tin.

== See also ==
- Melingriffith Tin Plate Works
- Grade II* listed buildings in Rhondda Cynon Taf

== Bibliography ==
- Minchinton, Walter E. (1957). The British Tinplate Industry, a History. Clarendon Press.
- Newman, John (1995). Glamorgan. The Buildings of Wales. London: Penguin Books. ISBN 0-14-071056-6.
- Wilkins, Charles (1903). The History of the Iron, Steel, Tinplate and other trades of Wales. Merthyr Tydfil: Joseph Williams.
- Williams, William (1895). A Sanitary Survey of Glamorganshire. Cardiff: Daniel Owne Ltd.
