= Gavin Milroy =

Scottish physician and medical writer (1805–1886)

Gavin Milroy (1805–1886) was a Scottish physician and medical writer, who funded the establishment of the Milroy Lectures.

== Life ==
Born in Edinburgh, where his father was in business, Milroy attended Edinburgh High School, and made medical studies at Edinburgh University. He became M.R.C.S. Edin. in June 1824, and M.D. Edin. in July 1828. He was one of the founders and active members of the Hunterian Society of Edinburgh.

Milroy then worked as a general practitioner in London. He made a voyage as medical officer in the government packet service to the West Indies and the Mediterranean, and on his return concentrated on writing for medical periodicals. An opponent of quarantine, he was recognised as an authority on epidemiology, and was employed in several government commissions of inspection and inquiry. In 1849-50 he was a superintendent medical inspector of the General Board of Health; in 1852 he was sent by the Colonial Office to Jamaica, and wrote an official sanitary report.

During the Crimean War in 1855–6, Milroy was a member of the sanitary commission sent out to the army; and at the end of the war, he joined John Sutherland in drawing up the commission's report. In 1858 he was honorary secretary of the committee appointed by the Social Science Association to inquire into the practice and results of quarantine, and the results of the inquiries were printed in three parliamentary papers.

Milroy belonged to the Medical and Chirurgical Society, and was involved in the establishment and management of the Epidemiological Society. He was admitted a licentiate of the Royal College of Physicians on 22 December 1847, and was elected a fellow in 1853. He had no permanent medical appointment from government, but a civil list pension was granted to him.

In later life Milroy lived at Richmond, Surrey, where he died 11 January 1886, at the age of 81. He was buried in Kensal Green cemetery. He survived his wife, Sophia Chapman, about three years, and had no children. Brought up as a member of the Church of Scotland, in later years he attended Anglican services.

== Legacy ==
Milroy is the namesake of the Milroy lectureship at the Royal College of Physicians. He left a legacy of £2,000 to the college for the endowment of a lectureship on "state medicine and public health", and subjects connected with those.

== Works ==
From 1844 Milroy was co-editor of James Johnson's Medico-Chirurgical Review, till it was amalgamated with Sir John Forbes's British and Foreign Medical Review in 1847. In October 1846 (iv. 285) he wrote in it a long review on a French report on Plague and Quarantine, by René-Clovis Prus (2 vols., Paris, 1846), and published an abridged translation, with preface and notes, as Quarantine and the Plague, London, 1846. He recommended the mitigation or total abolition of quarantine, and at the same time the dependence on sanitary measures alone for preservation from foreign pestilences. He also wrote articles on "Sydenham" in The Lancet, 1846–7; the article on "Plague" in John Russell Reynolds's System of Medicine, vol. i., and anonymous articles in the medical journals.

In 1862 Milroy was a member of a committee appointed by the College of Physicians at the request of the Colonial Office for the purpose of collecting information on the subject of leprosy. He dominated the committee, by 1865. Data were collected from the British Empire on the disease, which Milroy believed was "constitutional", and used selectively. The report was printed in 1867, and the appendix included Notes respecting the Leprosy of Scripture by Milroy.

== Notes ==
Attribution

This article incorporates text from a publication now in the public domain: Lee, Sidney, ed. (1894). "Milroy, Gavin". Dictionary of National Biography. Vol. 38. London: Smith, Elder & Co.
