= George Vivian Poore =

British physician and writer

- Born: 23 September 1843
- Died: 23 November 1904 (aged 61)
- Occupations: Physician, writer

George Vivian Poore (23 September 1843 – 23 November 1904) was a British physician and writer.

== Life ==
Poore was born in Andover, Hampshire, the youngest son of Commander John Poore, RN and educated at the Royal Naval School, New Cross, London and University College London. In 1866 he was awarded the diploma of M.R.C.S.Eng and served as Medical Officer on board the SS Great Eastern when she laid the first transatlantic telegraph cable later that same year. He returned afterwards to university and graduated MB and BS in 1868 and Doctor of Medicine in 1871. In 1872 he was asked by Queen Victoria to attend the Prince of Wales during a trip to France to recover from typhoid and afterwards to attend her youngest son who suffered from delicate health.

Poore was appointed Assistant Physician and then full Physician at University College Hospital. He was elected a Fellow of the Royal College of Physicians in 1877 and delivered their inaugural Bradshaw Lecture in 1881 entitled Nervous Affections of the Hand. He was later appointed to the Chair of Forensic Medicine at University College.

He was an authority of Sanitation Science and held strong views about the soil's ability to deal with waste. All his own household waste and that of his nearby tenants was successfully composted in his garden, which was watered with bathwater. He wrote a book, "The Earth in relation to the Preservation and Destruction of Contagia" which dealt with the relation of medical science to geology in areas such as water supply and sewerage disposal, which had been the subject of his Milroy Lecture to the Royal College of Physicians in 1899. With Sir William Jenner and Edward Sieveking he founded Museum of Hygiene at University College, London in 1877, which was formally incorporated under license of the Board of Trade. It was moved in 1882 from University College to new premises in Margaret Street, Cavendish Square.

In 1899 he was invited to give the Harveian Oration to the Royal College of Physicians.

He died at Ashford in 1904. He never married but lived for 30 years with his friend Marcus Beck.

== Selected publications ==
- Essays on Rural Hygiene (1893)
- The Earth in Relation to the Preservation and Destruction of Contagia (1899)
