= Trebanog =

Coordinates: 51.601°N 3.423°W

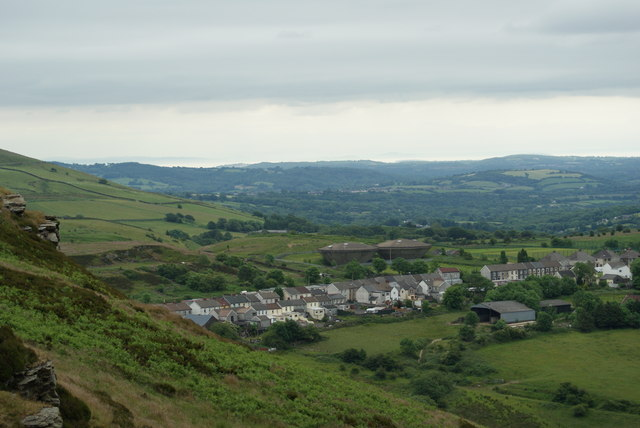

- Location within Rhondda Cynon Taf
- Principal area: Rhondda Cynon Taf
- Preserved county: Mid Glamorgan
- Country: Wales
- Sovereign state: United Kingdom
- Post town: PORTH
- Postcode district: CF39
- Police: South Wales
- Fire: South Wales
- Ambulance: Welsh
- UK Parliament: Rhondda
- Senedd Cymru – Welsh Parliament: Rhondda

Trebanog is a village in the Cymmer electoral ward lying on the southernmost outskirts of the Rhondda Valley, Rhondda Cynon Taf, Wales, located off the A4233 road between Porth and the town of Tonyrefail. Trebanog is an outlying district of the community of Cymmer, and is neighboured by the settlement of Edmondstown (a district of Penygraig). The area has been described as being on "high ground that seals off the Rhondda from the Vale of Glamorgan". Historically it was a mining village, and was home to the Trebanog Working Men's Club and Institute.

== Toponymy ==
Trebanog derives from the Welsh Tref Banog meaning the prominent homestead. From tref, meaning homestead, dwelling place and bannog meaning prominent, high, conspicuous, lofty.

== Notable people ==
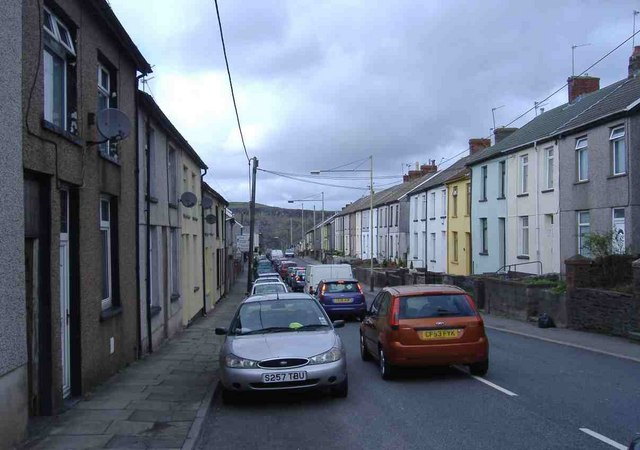

Popular singer and live performer Dorothy Squires (1915-1998) spent her final years living here in a home provided by a fan, Esme Coles, from 1995 to 1998. A plaque is due to be unveiled on the house.

Cliff Morgan (1930-2013), the Welsh rugby union player and commentator was from Trebanog.

Mrs Alma Bailey (1928 -2005) awarded the BEM medal for her services to foster care lived in Rhiwgarn Trebanog.
