= Mynydd William Meyrick =

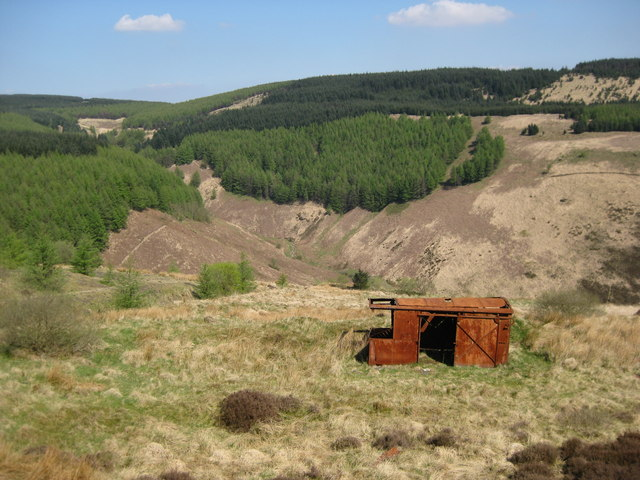
- View looking towards the wooded slopes of Mynydd William Meyrick

Highest point
- Elevation: 535 m (1,755 ft)
- Coordinates: 51.6357°N 3.5197°W

Naming
- English translation: William Meyrick's hill
- Language of name: Welsh

Geography
- Location: Bridgend & Rhondda Cynon Taf, Wales
- OS grid: SS949940
- Topo map: OS Landranger 170 / Explorer 166

Mynydd William Meyrick is a 535-metre-high hill straddling the boundary of Bridgend and Rhondda Cynon Taf county boroughs between the valley of the Rhondda Fawr and Ogmore Valley in South Wales. It takes the form of a broad northwest-southeast ridge with numerous broad shoulders extending to the east, south and west, each of which have different names and some of which constitute minor tops. Listed clockwise from the north these are; Mynydd Maendy, Mynydd Ton, Mynydd Bwllfa, Mynydd Pwllyrhebog, Mynydd Maes-teg, Mynydd y Gwair and Mynydd yr Aber. The summit of the entire massif is often referred to as Mynydd Ton. Its western sides are open moorland whilst its eastern sides have been afforested by the Forestry Commission (now managed by Natural Resources Wales).

== Geology ==
The hill is formed from Pennant Sandstone overlying a great thickness of the South Wales Coal Measures. Several coal seams outcrop on its flanks including (in descending order) the No1 Rhondda Rider, No1 Rhondda and the No2 Rhondda. These and other strata are affected by several geological faults, the most significant of which are aligned roughly northwest – southeast. Landslips affect some of the steeper slopes of the hill, not least those above Price Town on its western side.

== Access ==
Most of the hill, both the open moorland and the afforested parts, is recorded as open country under the Countryside and Rights of Way Act 2000 thereby giving largely unfettered access to walkers. A number of public rights of way cross the hill and provide access from neighbouring valleys.
