= Grade I listed buildings in Rhondda Cynon Taf =

List of buildings in county borough of Wales

Rhondda Cynon Taf shown within Wales

Rhondda Cynon Taf is a county borough in South Wales. It is located to the north-west of Cardiff and covers an area of 424 km^{2} (164 sq mi). In 2021 the population was approximately 237,500.

In the United Kingdom, the term listed building refers to a building or other structure officially designated as being of special architectural, historical, or cultural significance. Listing was begun by a provision in the Town and Country Planning Act 1947. Once a building is listed, strict limitations are imposed on the modifications allowed to its structure or fittings and alterations require listed building consent. In Wales, authority for listing or delisting, under the Planning (Listed Buildings and Conservation Areas) Act 1990, rests with the Welsh Ministers, though these decisions are based on the recommendations of Cadw. There are around 30,000 listed buildings in Wales and these are categorised into three grades: Grade I (one), II* (two star) and II (two). The highest is Grade I which denotes "buildings of exceptional interest" and makes up fewer than two per cent of the total number of listed buildings in Wales.

There are three Grade I listed buildings in Rhondda Cynon Taf. These are a mid-18th century bridge in Pontypridd and two structures related to the coal-mining heritage of the region; the engine house (1875) and the headframe (1902) of the Great Western Colliery near Hopkinstown. In 1746, William Edwards was employed to build a bridge over the River Taff. The 27-year-old self-taught architect had gained a reputation for the quality of his stonemasonry but this was his first bridge. His three-arched design lasted less than three years before being washed away in a flood when the build-up of debris around the piers caused the flow of the river to be obstructed. Following this, Edwards rebuilt the bridge to a single-span design. This bridge and a third of 1751 collapsed due to their weight but Edwards overcame these problems in 1756 with his fourth attempt which used circular holes through the two ends of the arch to reduce the load. John Newman describes this bridge as "the most famous and historic structure in Pontypridd".

The growth of iron foundries in Merthyr Tydfil led to the building of the Glamorganshire Canal (1791–1795) and the Taff Vale Railway (1841) to connect the industry to the docks at Cardiff; both of these passed through Pontypridd, contributing to its development into a major market town. In 1848 work started on the Gyfeillion Colliery (later known as Tymawr) and by 1875, when the Hetty shaft was sunk at Hopkinstown, the population of Pontypridd had reached 8,000. By the end of the century this had increased to 31,000, with collieries being the major employer in the region. A fire at the mine resulted in the death of 63 workers in April 1893. At the outbreak of the First World War production in the South Wales Coalfield was at its peak; there were 620 mines in South Wales and it was the world's largest coal exporter. After this time the industry went into a long decline and the Hetty shaft, whose seams had been worked out by 1923, became an emergency shaft for the Tymawr and Lewis Merthyr collieries. In 1981, only 35 mines remained in Wales and the Tymawr Colliery closed in 1983.

== Buildings ==
List of buildings
Name	Location Grid Ref. (Note: Sometimes known as OSGB36, the grid reference is based on the British national grid reference system used by the Ordnance Survey.) Geo-coordinates	Date Listed	Notes	Reference Number	Image
Pontypridd Bridge	Pontypridd; ST0741890417; 51°36′18″N 3°20′18″W	25 May 1962	A high-arched bridge with a single span of 42.7 metres (140 ft) over the River Taff on the north side of the town centre. The bridge, completed in 1756, was the fourth bridge built here by William Edwards, the first having been built ten years earlier. It was the widest span bridge in Britain until the construction of the 1796 Wearmouth Bridge in Sunderland. In addition to being Grade I listed, Pontypridd Bridge is designated as a scheduled monument.	13497	See more images
Hetty Engine House	Hopkinstown, Pontypridd; ST0546590905; 51°36′33″N 3°22′00″W	3 August 1984	Located on the west side of Hopkinstown, the Hetty Engine House was built in 1875 and is nationally important as one of the last colliery engine houses with the engine and headframe surviving in situ. The engine, a modified Barker and Cope double-cylinder engine, raised coal from a depth of 360 metres (1,180 ft). Newman describes it as a "monumentally tall rusticated Pennant sandstone engine house" and it is part of the Great Western Colliery scheduled monument.	13515	See more images
Headframe at Hetty Shaft	Hopkinstown, Pontypridd; ST0545590919; 51°36′33″N 3°22′00″W	3 August 1984	The Hetty shaft of the Gyfeillion Colliery was sunk in 1875 by the Great Western Colliery Company. The headframe, attached to the north side of the engine house, was built in 1902 as a replacement for the original wooden headframe and is one of the earliest surviving steel headframes in the South Wales Coalfield. The steep angle of the diagonal legs from the engine house to the headframe are a result of the narrowness of the terrace upon which the colliery is located. The headframe was made by R. Nevill and Co of Llanelly and is part of the Great Western Colliery scheduled monument.	24872	See more images

== See also ==
- List of scheduled monuments in Rhondda Cynon Taf
- Grade II* listed buildings in Rhondda Cynon Taf
- Registered historic parks and gardens in Rhondda Cynon Taf
