= Milroy Lectures =

The Milroy Lectures are given on topics in public health, to the Royal College of Physicians, London. They were set up by money left by Gavin Milroy, who died in 1886.

== List of lectures ==
=== To 1900 ===
- 1888 Robert Lawson, Epidemic Influences
- 1889 John Thomas Arlidge, Hygiene, Diseases and Mortality of Occupations
- 1890 Arthur Ransome, The Causes and Prevention of Phthisis
- 1891 Sir Richard Thorne, Diphtheria: Its Natural History and Prevention
- 1892 Francis Warner, On an Inquiry as to the Physical and Mental Condition of School Children
- 1893 Arthur Whitelegge, On Changes of Type in Epidemic Diseases
- 1894 John Berry Haycraft, Darwinism and Race Progress
- 1895 Arthur Newsholme, The Natural History and Affinities of Rheumatic Fever
- 1896 Edward Cox Seaton, The Value of Isolation and its Difficulties
- 1897 William Collingridge, On Quarantine
- 1898 Sydney Arthur Monckton Copeman, On the Natural History of Vaccinia, book versionVaccination, Its Natural History and Pathology
- 1899 George Vivian Poore, The Earth in Relation to the Destruction and Preservation of Contagia
- 1900 Frederick Joseph Waldo, Summer Diarrhœa, with Special Regard to Causation and Prevention

=== 1901 to 1950 ===
- 1901 John Frederick J. Sykes, On The Influence of the Dwelling upon Health
- 1902 William Henry Corfield, On the Etiology of Typhoid Fever and its Prevention
- 1903 Herbert Timbrell Bulstrode, On the Causes, Prevalence and Control of Pulmonary Tuberculosis
- 1904 William Williams, On Deaths in Childbed: A Preventable Mortality
- 1905 Thomas Morison Legge, On Industrial Anthrax
- 1906 William Heaton Hamer, Epidemic Disease in England: The Evidence of Variability and of Persistency of Type
- 1907 Leonard Rogers, On Kāla-azār
- 1908 John William Henry Eyre, On melitensis septicaemia (Malta or Mediterranean Fever)
- 1909 Richard Tanner Hewlett, On Disinfection and Disinfectants
- 1910 Alexander Grant Russell Foulerton, The Streptotrichoses and Tuberculosis
- 1911 Arthur Edwin Boycott, On Ankylostoma infection
- 1912 Francis Arthur Bainbridge, On Paratyphoid Fever and Meat Poisoning
- 1913 Robert McCarrison, On the Etiology of Endemic Goitre
- 1914 Frank Shufflebotham, On the Hygienic Aspects of the Coal-Mining Industry in the United Kingdom
- 1915 Edgar Leigh Collis, Industrial pneumonoconioses with special reference to dust phthisis, published 1919
- 1916 Samson George Moore, Infantile Mortality and the Relative Practical Value of Measures Directed to Its Prevention
- 1917 William James Howarth, Meat inspection: with special reference to the developments of recent years
- 1918 Henry Richard Kenwood, On the Teaching and Training in Hygiene: Some Criticisms and Suggestions
- 1919 John Christie McVail, Half a Century of Small-pox and Vaccination
- 1920 Aldo Castellani, The higher Fungi in relation to Human Pathology
- 1921 Martin Flack, On Respiratory Efficiency in Relation to Health and Disease
- 1922 Major Greenwood, on the Influence of Industrial Employment upon General Health
- 1923 William George Savage, Canned Foods in Relation to Health
- 1924 William Glen Liston, Epidemiology of Plague
- 1925 Arthur Salusbury MacNalty, On Epidemic Diseases of the Central Nervous System
- 1926 William Whiteman Carlton Topley, Experimental Epidemiology in Mice
- 1927 William Francis Dearden, Health Hazards in the Cotton Industry
- 1928 Francis Albert Eley Crew, Genetical Aspects of Natural Immunity and Disease Resistance
- 1929 James Graham Forbes, Diphtheria Immunisation
- 1930 James Alison Glover, On the Incidence of Rheumatic Diseases
- 1931 Sheldon Francis Dudley, On Lessons on Infectious Diseases in The Royal Navy
- 1932 Charles Cyril Okell, On haemolytic streptococci
- 1933 Robert Cruickshank, on Pneumococcal infections
- 1934 George Seaton Buchanan, International co-operation in public health
- 1935 Eric Henry Rhys Harries, Infection and its Control in Children's Wards
- 1936 Edward Loggie Middleton, Industrial Pilmonary Disease due to the Inhalation of Dust
- 1937 Philip Montague D'Arcy Hart, prevention of pulmonary tuberculosis among adults in England
- 1938 Bernard Edward Schlesinger, Public Health Aspect of Heart Disease in Childhood
- 1939 Donald Stewart, Industrial Medical Services In Great Britain: A Critical Survey
- 1940 Ronald Edward Smith
- 1941 Norman Brandon Capon
- 1942 William Norman Pickles, Epidemic Diseases in Village Life in Peace and War
- 1943 Sydney Alexander Henry
- 1944 Arthur Harold Gale, A Century of Changes in the Mortality and Incidence of the Principal Infections which Cause Death or Disability in Childhood
- 1945 Henry Stanley Banks, Meningococcosis: a protean disease
- 1946 Hugh Edward Magee, Application of Nutrition to Public Health
- 1947 Ronald Epey Lane, The care of the lead worker
- 1948 Graham Selby Wilson, The Public Health laboratory Service
- 1949 Marc Daniels, Tuberculosis in post-war Europe
- 1950 Weldon Dalrymple-Champneys, Undulant fever, a neglected problem

=== 1951 to 2000 ===
- 1951 John Constable Broom, Leptospirosis
- 1952 Victor Henry Springett, An interpretation of statistical trends in tuberculosis
- 1953 W. Richard S. Doll, Bronchial carcinoma, incidence and aetiology
- 1954 D.A. Long, The pathogenesis of Rheumatic Fever
- 1955 James A. Smiley, Personal factors in accident proneness
- 1956 Richard Selwyn Francis Schilling, Chronic respiratory disease amongst cotton and other textile workers
- 1957 D.D. Reid, Environmental factors in respiratory disease
- 1958 Cecily D. Williams, Social medicine in developing countries
- 1959 Albert Ray Southwood, Aspects of Preventive Cardiology
- 1960 Leslie George Norman, The Medical Aspects of the Prevention of Road Accidents
- 1961 Henry George Miller, Accident neurosis
- 1962 R.F.L. Logan, The quality of medical care
- 1963 Andrew Meiklejohn, The Successful Prevention of Lead Poisoning and Silicosis in the North Staffordshire Potteries
- 1964 Alick John Robertson, Tin Mining
- 1965 William Ivor Neil Kessel, Self-poisoning
- 1966 Daniel Thomson, Mass immunization in the control of infectious diseases
- 1967 Leon Golberg, Topics pertaining to the amelioration of food
- 1968? Arthur Salusbury MacNalty, The Prevention of Smallpox
- 1968 P. Henderson, The changing pattern of disease and disability in schoolchildren
- 1969 Kenneth Sunderland Holt, The Quality of Survival
- 1970 W.R. Thrower, Agriculture and the public health
- 1971 Richard de Alarcon, Drug Abuse as a Communicable Disease
- 1972 A. Gerald Shaper, Cardiovascular Disease in the Tropics
- 1973 D.J. Bauer, Antiviral Chemotherapy-the first decade
- 1974 Julian Tudor Hart, The marriage of primary care and epidemiology
- 1975 John Lorber, The history of the management of myelomeningocele and hydrocephalus
- 1976 John Pemberton, Some failures of modern medicine
- 1977 John Peel Sparks, Recent experience of influenza
- 1978 Bertram Mann, Pulmonary asbestosis with special reference to an epidemic at Hebden Bridge
- 1979 Frederic Stanley William Brimblecombe, A new approach to the care of handicapped children
- 1980 David Henry Morgan Woollam, Teratogens in everyday life
- 1981 R. V. H. Jones, Privacy and the public health
- 1983 A. J. Buller, Research in and for the NHS
- 1984 Adetokunbo Oluwole O. Lucas, The persistent challenge of malaria and other tropical infections
- 1985 P. S. Harper, The prevention of Huntingdon's chorea: a study in genetics and epidemiology
- 1986 A. Young, The cachexia of old age
- 1987 R. Goulding, Poisoning as a social phenomenon
- 1988 J.E. Cotes, Occupational health today and tomorrow: a view from two shipyards
- 1989 R. Harris, The new genetics: a challenge to traditional medicine
- 1990 Clifford F. Hawkins, Audit of medico‐legal actions arising in the NHS
- 1992 Richard J. Lilford, Logic versus intuition in medical decision making
- 1993 Ian M. Leck, Clinical and public health ethics‐conflicting or complementary?
- 1994 S. Ebrahim, Public health implications of ageing
- 1995 Zarrina Kurtz, Do children's rights to health care in the UK ensure their best interests?
- 1997 Joe Collier, Rationalising state spending on medicines
- 1998 Graham C.M. Watt, Not only scientists but also responsible citizens
- 2000 John Ashton, State medicine and public hygiene ‐ implications of the new public health

=== From 2001 ===
- 2001 Peter Elwood, Aspirin: past, present and future
- 2002 Gabriel J. Scally, "The very pests of society" – the Irish and 150 years of public health in England
- 2003 Graham Winyard, Doctors, managers and politicians
- 2004 Rajan Madhok, Doctors in the new millennium: Hippocrates or Hypocrites?; M. W. Adler, Sex is dangerous!
- 2005 C. M. McKee, Winners and losers: the health effects of political transition in Eastern Europe
- 2006 J. R. Britton, Smoking: the biggest challenge to public health
- 2007 P. Tyrer, Personality disorder and public mental health
- 2008 R. Zimmern, Testing challenges: the evaluation of novel diagnostics and biomarkers
- 2009 C. Law, Will our children be healthy adults?
- 2010 P. Easterbrook, Universal access to antiretroviral therapy by 2010: responding to the challenge
- 2011 S. Griffiths, Promoting the public's health: lessons from east and west
- 2012 Gareth Williams, Flat learning curve: why the anti-vaccination movement has survived into the 21st century
- 2014 Chris Whitty, Eradication of disease: Hype, hope and reality
- 2017 John Middleton Secure, healthy, inclusive and green – four dividends of a healthier future

== See also ==
- Bradshaw Lecture
- Fitzpatrick Lecture
- Goulstonian Lecture
- Harveian Oration
- Hunterian Oration
- Lumleian Lectures
