= Cadair Fawr =

Hill (485m) in Rhondda Cynon Taf, Wales

Cadair Fawr is a hill in the northern corner of the county borough of Rhondda Cynon Taf, Wales. It lies within the Brecon Beacons National Park and Fforest Fawr Geopark. The 485m high summit at OS grid ref SN 978123 is marked by a trig point. Cadair Fawr is the highest point of a broad ridge known as Cefn Cadlan which forms the northern edge of Cwm Cadlan, a valley which itself runs east-northeastwards from the village of Penderyn. The name Cadair Fawr signifies the 'big chair' whilst Cefn Cadlan signifies the 'ridge of the battlefield'.

== Geology ==
The summit is formed from Carboniferous Limestone whilst much of the Cefn Cadlan ridge which slopes away to the west is formed from the Twrch Sandstone (formerly known as the Basal Grit), which also dates from the Carboniferous period. A series of minor faults runs northwest to southeast through the hill whilst a few including the Coed Hir Fault run northeast to southwest, paralleling the major fault forming a part of the Neath Disturbance which runs through Cwm Cadlan. Much of the hill's surface is pitted by shakeholes, the larger of which occur on the areas where gritstone forms the surface. Quarries have been opened up in both the limestone and the gritstone over the years though none are now active.

== Scheduled ancient monuments ==
Cadair Fawr Round Cairn
(51.7992°N 3.4844°W, OS grid ref: SN977122.) A large cairn, 9m across, near the summit of Cadair Fawr (also sometimes spelled Cader Fawr Round Cairn).
Pant-y-Gadair Hut Circle Settlement
(51.8049°N 3.4719°W, OS grid ref: SN98612.) A prehistoric hut circle 6m across, with walls of unworked limestone, on the north slopes of Cadair Fawr.
Cadair Fawr settlement
(51.7993°N 3.472°W, OS grid ref: SN985122) - A group of medieval or later house platforms east of the summit of Cadair Fawr.

== Access ==
The hill is designated as open country so freely available to walkers. It is readily accessed from the A4059 road which runs along its northern edge between Hirwaun and the A470 road south of Storey Arms.

== See also ==
List of Scheduled Monuments in Rhondda Cynon Taf
