= Arthur MacNalty =

British doctor

Sir Arthur Salusbury MacNalty KCB MRCS FRCP FRCS FRSE (20 October 1880 – 11 April 1969) was the 8th Chief Medical Officer of the United Kingdom. Arthur MacNalty was also a ground breaking medical scientist. In 1908, early in his career, he joined with the Welshman Thomas Lewis (cardiologist) to demonstrate that tracings from the nascent science of electrocardiography (ECG) could be used as a tool for diagnosing heart block. This use of electrocardiography to diagnose heart block was the earliest use of ECG technology in cardiology and clinical medicine. He was a pioneer in the modern discipline of public health and in the speciality of preventive medicine. In the 1930s, MacNalty became among the earliest public health authorities, if not the earliest, to warn against the serious medical dangers of fad dieting (slimming) and anti-obesity medications. He was particularly concerned with the neurological side effects of the popular practice of dosing with thyroid extract to lose weight. MacNalty was a prolific author of acclaimed medical and other histories, which have retained their value. He was the author of 96 books in the fields of medicine and history in 154 publications in three languages, which are held in at least 2,700 library collections.

== Life ==
Arthur MacNalty was born in Glenridding in Westmorland into a long line of Irish physicians living in the Britain. MacNalty was the son of Dr Francis Charles MacNalty MD and his wife, Hester Emma Frances Gardner. MacNalty was educated at Corpus Christi College, Oxford, where he was Shute Exhibitioner and took second class in the Oxford Honor School of Physiology (researcher on central nervous system, Dept. of Physiology). From Oxford, he went to University College Hospital, London, where he was Filliter Exhibitioner and qualified MRCP and LRCP in 1907. MacNalty received his M.D. Oxon (1911) for his dissertation Lyphadenoma with relapsing Pyrexia. After a series of medical and surgical postings at hospitals, he abandoned his course toward specializing as a thoracic physician (the speciality of "chest service", tuberculosis being endemic), when called to government service as a public health officer in 1913 (even though solicited to assume this office, MacNalty worked in preparation for nearly a year as Assistant Medical Officer and Tuberculosis Officer to Essex County Council, under their progressive County Medical Officer, J. Thresh) and through which public office ranks he rose to his appointment as Britain's Chief Medical Officer (1935–1941). MacNalty became an authority on communicable diseases, public health and on endocrine system based neurological disorders. He was president of the Royal Society of Medicine's Epidemiology and its Medical History sections. During the Second World War MacNalty was Chairman of the Committees on Hospital and Nursing Provision of the Committee of Imperial Defence and organised the medical administration of the Emergency Medical Services and the Evacuation Scheme of the Ministry of Health. The British Public Health Laboratory Service developed from a wartime emergency service on the basis of a survey initiated by MacNalty. In a 1939 paper solicited by Oxford University, MacNalty advocated the establishment of a pioneering preventive and social medicine department at the University, which lead to the establishment of the first Chair of Social medicine there by 1943.

== Family ==
In 1913 MacNalty was married to Dorothea Simpkinson de Wesselow (d.1968). MacNalty had two daughters.

== Some medical papers ==
- "A note on the simultaneous occurrence of sinus and ventricular rhythm in man", Lewis T., Macnalty A. S., J. Physiol. 1908 Dec 15;37(5-6):445–58
- MacNalty "Thoracic Aneurysm in a Boy", Proc R Soc Med. 1910;3 (Clin Sect):35-7
- MacNalty "THE OPHTHALMO-REACTION IN THE DIAGNOSIS OF CHRONIC PULMONARY TUBERCULOSIS", Br Med J. 1911 Dec 2;2(2657):1471–2
- MacNalty "An Obscure Disease, Encephalitis Lethargica" (delivered to Health Ministry 1918)
- "Report on Artificial Pneumothorax" (Medical Research Council. Special Report Series. no. 67.) by Lancelot Stephen Topham Burrell and Arthur Salusbury Macnalty (1922), ASIN: B000WR7DKG
- MacNalty "A Lecture on Encephalitis Lethargica in England", Br Med J. 1926 Jun 26;1(3416):1073–6
- MacNalty, Milroy Lectures on "Epidemic Diseases of the Central Nervous System" (delivered to the Royal College of Physicians 1927, published in bound volume that year as The Epidemic Diseases of the Central Nervous System, 194 pages, publisher, Faber & Gwyer, 1927, ASIN: B0006AK0OK)
- MacNalty "Lymphadenoma with Relapsing Pyrexia" (delivered to the Ministry of Health 1928 and also published in bound volume as An investigation of lymphadenoma with relapsing pyrexia, 86 pages, publisher, H.M. Stationery, (1928), ASIN: B0008B2ZPE)
- "The Intradermal Tuberculin Test in Cattle, Collected results of experience" (Medical Research Council. Special Report Series No. 122, by James Basil Buxton and Arthur Salusbury Macnalty (1928), ASIN: B000WR2KJK
- MacNalty "EPIDEMIC POLIOMYELITIS: EPIDEMIOLOGY, CAUSES, AND PREVENTION", Br Med J. 1936 Jul 11;2(3940):57–62
- MacNalty "Comprehensive Attack on Pulmonary Tuberculosis", Br Med J. 1943 Nov 13;2(4323):599–601
- MacNalty "Indigenous Malaria in Great Britain", Nature, Vol. 151, April 17, 1943, pp 440–442
- MacNalty "The problem of tuberculosis; prevention and treatment", Health Soc Welf. 1945–1946:67–74
- MacNalty, FitzPatrick Lectures on the "History of State Medicine in England" (delivered to the Royal College of Physicians from 1946 to 1947), published in bound volume as The History of State Medicine in England, being the Fitzpatrick Lectures of the Royal College of Physicians of London for the years 1946 and 1947 (Royal Society of Public Health and Public Hygiene, 1948, ASIN: B0007JEOJC, 82 pages )
- "The Future of the Tuberculosis and Chest Service in Great Britain", ELLMAN P, MACNALTY AS, J R Inst Public Health, 1954 Aug;17(8):217–34
- MacNalty "Ah, my old friend Dr. Harvey", British Medical Journal, 1958
- MacNalty "Alexander Pope: Poet and Cripple", 1688–1744, Proc R Soc Med. 1958 August; 51(8): 601–604, available for free reading and printing online at .
- MacNalty "William Harvey: His influence on public health" Royal Society of Health Journal ASIN: B0007KBIHC (1957)
- MacNalty "The Royal Society and its medical presidents", British Medical Journal, 1960
- MacNalty "Sir Joseph Olliffe MD FRCP" British Medical Journal (1965)
- MacNalty "History of medicine at Yale" British Medical Journal (1962)
- MacNalty "Florence Nightingale's writings" British Medical Journal (1962)
- MacNalty "Dr. Timothie Bright" British Medical Journal (1963)
- MacNalty "Pathology in North America" British Medical Journal (1963)
- MacNalty "Osler, the medical historian" Proceedings of the Royal Society of Medicine (1962)
- MacNalty "Great teachers of surgery in the past: Sir Victor Horsley (1857–1916)" British Journal of Surgery [(1964)
- MacNalty "Frederick Parkes Weber: 8 May 1863–2 June 1962" Journal of Pathology and Bacteriology (1963)
- MacNalty "History of the College Club of the Royal College of Physicians of London", Volume 2, 1926 to 1961 (1964)
- MacNalty "The Mirage of Alcohol. An address delivered at the annual meeting of the Temperance Collegiate Association" (1946)

== Some medical texts and lexicons ==
- MacNalty, Editor in Chief of Butterworth's Medical Dictionary (1965–1978 London, Butterworth, ASIN: B004V71DWC)
- McNalty wrote preface to The Endocrine Glands: (xii) diseases of the nervous system by L. E. Houghton, London, William Hetoemann (Medical books) Ltd., 1944, 674 pages, Illustrated
- Epidemics in schools : an analysis of the data collected during the first five years of a statistical inquiry by the School epidemics committee by Medical Research Council (Great Britain) (1938)
- Medical services in war: the principal medical lessons of the Second World War; based on the official medical histories of the United Kingdom, Canada, Australia, New Zealand and India by A. S. MacNalty (5 editions published between 1968 and 1969, HMSO, ASIN: B0018BA8MU)
- MacNalty, Editor in Chief of The Official Medical History of the Second World War in 21 volumes
- MacNalty, Editor in Chief of The British Medical Dictionary (4 editions 1961–63, 1682 pages, The Caxton Publishing Company, ASIN: B001582PCC)
- The civilian health and medical services by A. S. MacNalty (H.M.S.O. 1953, 441 pages)
- The preservation of eyesight by A. S. MacNalty (3 editions Bristol, John Wright, 1958, ASIN: B000IUE0HG)
- The reform of the public health services by A. S. MacNalty (4 editions published between 1943 and 1944, Oxford University Press, ASIN: B0017B558I)

== Some medical histories ==
- Henry VIII, a difficult patient, ( 2 editions 1952, ASIN: B0006ATAK0) by A. S. MacNalty
- Medicine in the time of Queen Elizabeth, the First, 1,185 pages, ASIN: B0007KB0NY by A. S. MacNalty
- Sir Thomas More as public health reformer, Printed in Great Britain by Fisher, Knight and Co., Ltd., St. Albans (1946), ASIN: B0007KB0O8 by A. S. MacNalty
- Sir Walter Scott: the wounded falcon, (3 editions 1969) by A. S. MacNalty
- Sir William Collins, surgeon and statesman, Chadwick Trust (1949), ASIN: B0007JMUZC by A. S. MacNalty
- The influence of medical poets on English poetry, 208 pages, ASIN: B0007KB0NO by A. S. MacNalty
- THE RENAISSANCE AND ITS INFLUENCE ON ENGLISH MEDICINE, SURGERY AND PUBLIC HEALTH: BEING THE THOMAS VICARY LECTURE FOR 1945, (London 5 editions 1945–1946, Christopher Johnson, ASIN: B0010YZLJA) by A. S. MacNalty
- The Sovereign and the Surgeon,(1953) ASIN: B0007KB0OI by A. S. MacNalty

== Some other histories ==
- A biography of Sir Benjamin Ward Richardson (2 editions published in 1950) by A.S. MacNalty
- Elizabeth Tudor – the lonely queen (4 editions published between 1954 and 1971, London, Johnson, ASIN: B002KDQMGG) by A.S. MacNalty
- Mary, Queen of Scots, the daughter of debate (5 editions published between 1960 and 1971, London, Christopher Johnson, ASIN: 0853075875) by A.S. MacNalty
- Princes in the Tower, and other royal mysteries (1955, London, Christopher Johnson) by A.S. MacNalty
- The Odes of Horace; Books I and II (1955) by Quintus Horatius Flaccus, translated by Arthur Salusbury Macnalty, ASIN: B0010ZR5PC
- The Mystery of Captain Burnaby (1934) ASIN: B0014M00OE by A.S. MacNalty
- The Three Churchills (London 2 editions 1949, Essential Books Ltd, ASIN: B000KYI4DG) by A.S. MacNalty
- Winston Spencer Churchill, Servant of Crown and Commonwealth. A Tribute By Various Hands presented to Him on His Eightieth Birthday (1954, London, Cassell & Company), Sir James Marchant (Ed.), contributors of impressions from personal acquaintance include Sir Arthur Salusbury MacNalty

== See also ==
Barber's pole at footnote 3
