= Pontypridd Municipal Buildings =

Municipal Building in Pontypridd, Wales

- Adeiladau Bwrdeistrefol Pontypridd (Welsh)
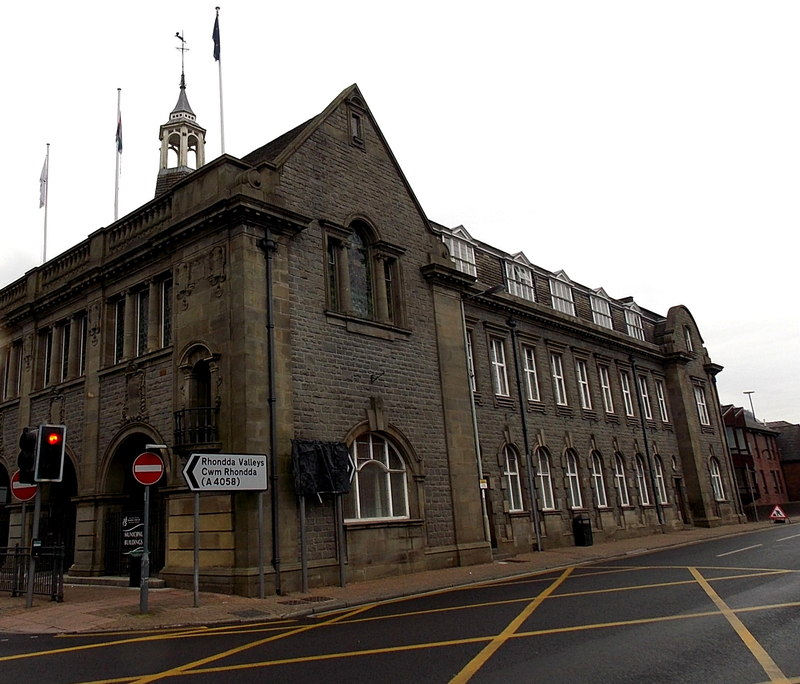
- The building in November 2014

- Shown in Rhondda Cynon Taf
- 51.6047°N 3.3407°W
- Location: Gelliwastad Road, Pontypridd

History
- Built: 1906

Site notes
- Architect: Henry Hare
- Architectural style: Baroque style

Listed Building – Grade II*
- Official name: Municipal Buildings
- Designated: 17 January 1990
- Reference no.: 13532

The Municipal Buildings (Welsh: Adeiladau Bwrdeistrefol Pontypridd) is a municipal building located on Gelliwastad Road, Pontypridd in Rhondda Cynon Taf in Wales. The structure, which is currently used as a register office, is a Grade II* listed building.

== History ==
Following significant population growth, largely associated with coal mining and the local ironworks, a local board of health was established in Pontypridd in 1873. After the local board was succeeded by Pontypridd Urban District Council in 1894, the new council decided to commission municipal offices. The site they selected was on the northwest side of Morgan Street.

Henry Hare won a competition to design the new building, and construction started in 1903. It was designed in the Baroque style, built in rubble masonry with ashlar stone dressings, and was officially opened by the member of parliament, Alfred Thomas, in April 1906. Hare's design provided a council chamber and offices at right-angles.

The building continued to serve as the offices of the urban district council for much of the 20th century, and became the headquarters of the enlarged Taff-Ely District Council when it was established in 1974. However, it ceased to be the local seat of government when the new unitary authority, Rhondda Cynon Taf County Borough Council, was formed in 1996, and subsequently became the local register office.

== Architecture ==
The building is constructed of rubble masonry, with stone dressings, and a slate roof. It has two storeys and an attic. The main front is three bays wide and topped by an octagonal bellcote with a weathervane. The ground floor has semicircular arches, within which the main entrance and windows are deeply recessed. There are sculptures designed by John Dudley Forsyth and niches with staircases. The east side has 11 bays, with the end bays brought forward. The interior is well preserved; the main entrance leads to a lobby with a stone staircase, while upstairs are the council chamber, committee room and mayor's parlour, each with original furniture. The chamber is described by CADW as "exceptionally fine", with seating in a "D" formation, stained glass, and a vaulted ceiling on pilasters. The parlour also has an elaborate ceiling, and the committee room has its original chimneypiece. The building was grade II* listed in 1990.

== See also ==
- Grade II* listed buildings in Rhondda Cynon Taf
