= Treforest =

Suburban village in Pontypridd, Wales

Coordinates: 51°35′16″N 3°19′20″W

Treforest: Welsh: Trefforest
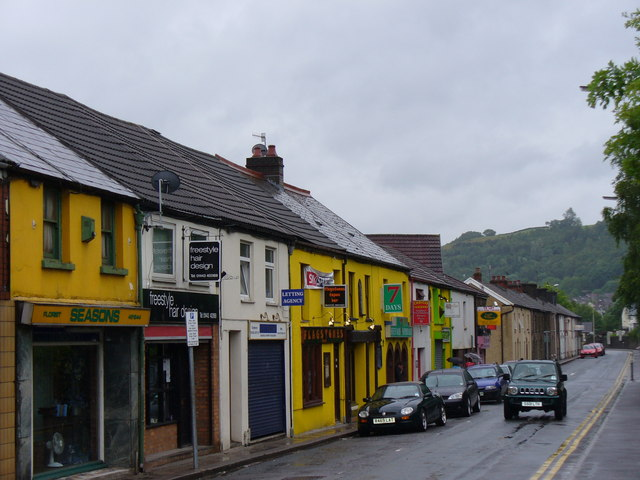
- Park Street

- Location within Rhondda Cynon Taf
- Population: 5,050 (2011 ward)
- OS grid reference: ST085885
- Community: Pontypridd Town
- Principal area: Rhondda Cynon Taf
- Preserved county: Mid Glamorgan
- Country: Wales
- Sovereign state: United Kingdom
- Post town: PONTYPRIDD
- Postcode district: CF37
- Dialling code: 01443
- Police: South Wales
- Fire: South Wales
- Ambulance: Welsh
- UK Parliament: Pontypridd
- Senedd Cymru – Welsh Parliament: Pontypridd, South Wales Central Electoral Region

Treforest (Welsh: Trefforest) is a village in the south-east of Pontypridd, in the county borough of Rhondda Cynon Taf, Wales. It is situated in the Treforest electoral ward, along with the village of Glyntaff (or Glyn-Taf). It is part of the Pontypridd Town community. Treforest runs along the west bank of the River Taff (Welsh: Afon Taf), while Glyntaff runs along its east bank.

Treforest extends from immediately south-east of Ynysangharad Park, where the A4058 link from the A470 joins the A473 Broadway (south of the adjoining wards of Graig and Trallwn), all the way to join the Tonteg ward in the south (part of the community of Llantwit Fardre).

The village is historically connected with the Crawshay family, who established a major tinplate works in 1835. Treforest is now known for its association with the University of South Wales, originally established as the Newport Mechanics Institute in the 1840s, the campus in Treforest was established as the School of Mines in 1913.

Treforest Industrial Estate is not part of Treforest or its electoral ward, most of which is not even within Pontypridd. Instead, this falls partly within the area of Upper Boat (Pontypridd), but mostly within the Willowford area of Ton-Teg (Llantwit Fardre) and Nantgarw (Taffs Well ward).

== Transport ==
Treforest has one railway station, Treforest (Treforest Estate is in the Willowford area between Tonteg and Nantgarw). The railway station is located on the Merthyr and Rhondda lines, between Pontypridd and Treforest Estate railway stations.

== Education ==
Treforest has two primary schools; Parc Lewis, and St. Michael's; though a third school, Trefforest Primary, closed in 2006 despite the petitions from parents, governors and local councillor, as a result of a process commenced by the 1999–2004 administration on the Rhondda Cynon Taf County Borough Council. The University of South Wales' Trefforest campus (previously the University of Glamorgan) is located in the village.

== Culture ==
The population of Treforest consists substantially of students living away from home, who often leave the village during the summer months, and return in the new academic year.

Treforest is home to association football team Treforest F.C.: this mid-sized Club currently runs teams from Under 8 level to Seniors. The Senior teams play in the South Wales Alliance League and Taff Ely and Rhymney Valley Leagues. Treforest has a purpose-built stadium and club facilities with two bars. Treforest F.C. is affiliated to the South Wales Football Association and is a full member of the Football Association of Wales.

== Governance ==
Treforest has been an electoral ward to Rhondda Cynon Taf County Borough Council since 1995, electing one county borough councillor. It has been represented by the Labour Party, Plaid Cymru and the Liberal Democrats at various points since 1995.

Treforest is also a community ward to Pontypridd Town Council, electing three town councillors.

It is part of the South Wales Central region in the Senedd and there is one directly elected member from the Pontypridd constituency and four additional regional members.

In the Westminster parliament it is part of the Pontypridd constituency.

== Treforest Estate ==
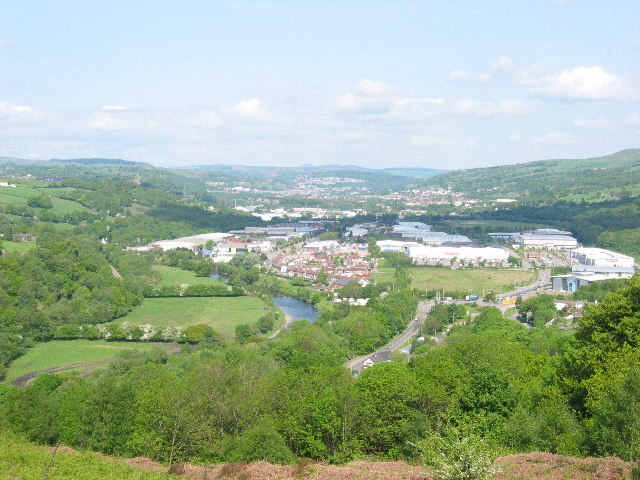
Treforest Industrial Estate

The Treforest Trading Estate, later renamed Treforest Industrial Estate, originated with the formation of the 'South Wales and Monmouthshire Trading Estates Ltd.' in June 1936. This non-profit making company aimed to establish one or more trading estates in Wales, and the first sod was cut on 29 December 1936; 89 years ago. By the end of 1937, three small factories had been completed and occupied. The first building contract awarded was a large factory for the British Coated Board and Paper Company Ltd (Wiggins Teape).

During the Second World War, the factories on the estate played a major role in the war effort and national economy; many buildings were requisitioned by the government, and their occupants re-housed in makeshift buildings away from the estate. Extensions and new factories were built by government departments.

Many of the companies on the Estate were established by businesspeople who had arrived as refugees from German-occupied Europe. They had often been able to bring money and equipment with them.

By 1944, almost 16,000 people were being employed on the estate. In 1960, the estate came under the control of the 'Welsh Industrial Estates Corporation', and later, the Welsh Development Agency.

Companies which have operated factories on the Estate include: BOAC, Aero Zip, Metal Alloys Ltd, Afon Tinplate Ltd, Finetex Ltd, Ford, South Wales Switchgear, Standard Telephones and Cables, Fram Filters and KLG Spark Plugs.

In December 2023 a fire broke out on the estate. At around 19:00 on 13 December there was an explosion followed by a fire at Rizla House, a building housing multiple businesses, killing one person.

== Notable people from Treforest ==
=== Sir Tom Jones ===
Treforest is the birthplace of singer Sir Tom Jones, who was born on 7 June 1940 at 57, Kingsland Terrace. Jones had a telephone box from Pontypridd at his Los Angeles home, imported as a souvenir of his home town.

=== Morfydd Llwyn Owen ===
The composer Morfydd Llwyn Owen (1891–1918) was born in Treforest, and educated at the Royal Academy of Music in London. She wrote hymns, choral music and orchestral works, often inspired by Welsh literacy and folk songs. In 1917, she married psychoanalyst Ernest Jones, but she died the following year at the age of 26.

=== Meic Stephens ===
Meic Stephens (1938–2018), the literary journalist, translator, poet and author, who was professor of creative writing and journalism at the University of Glamorgan, was born in Treforest.

== Tourist attraction ==
World of Groggs is on the Broadway in Treforest, celebrating the ceramic figurines.

Television series Doctor Who, Torchwood, and The Sarah Jane Adventures were filmed at Upper Boat Studios on Treforest Industrial Estate, before moving to Roath Lock studios in Cardiff Bay in 2011.

== Places of worship ==
Treforest has been/is home to a number of Places of Worship:

- Calvary English Baptist Chapel, Cliff Terrace. Founded 1849. Closed. Building Sold in 2021.
- English Independent (United Reformed Church), Castle Square. Founded in 1905.
- Libanus Welsh Baptist Chapel, Fothergill Street. Founded in 1841. Now the Cornerstone Pentecostal Church, as of 2010.
- Park Presbyterian Church, Princess Street. Founded in 1909. Closed.
- Pontypridd Synagogue, Cliff Terrace. Founded in 1867, Closed 1978. Converted to apartments..
- Saron Welsh Calvinistic Methodist Chapel, Saron Street. Founded in 1832, closed in 1992. Later, the All Nations church from about 2010, since closed.
- St Dyfrig's Roman Catholic Church, Broadway. Founded in 1868.
- Treforest English Wesleyan Methodist Chapel, Cyrch-y-Gwas Road. Founded in 1852. Closed.
- Treforest Gospel Hall, Broadway
- Treforest Spiritualist National Union Church, Cyrch-y-Gwas Road.
