= John Meiklejohn =

Scottish academic, journalist, and author

John Miller Dow Meiklejohn (/ˈmiːkəldʒɒn/; 11 July 1830 – 5 April 1902) was a Scottish academic, journalist and author known for writing school books.

== Life ==
Born in Edinburgh on 11 July 1830, he was son of John Meiklejohn, an Edinburgh schoolmaster, and was educated at his father's private school at 7 St. Anthony Place, Port Hopetoun. He graduated with an MA from the University of Edinburgh on 21 April 1858, when he was the gold medallist in Latin. At an early age he devoted himself to German philosophy, and became a private schoolmaster, first in Bowdon in 1858 and then in 1874 in Orme Square, London. He also lectured and took up journalism, in 1864 acting as a war correspondent in the Second Schleswig War, and being arrested as a spy.

22 December 1864 he married Jane Cussans (1841–1922), daughter of T. Cussans late HEIC, at St Luke's Church, Kings Cross. London. They had (at least) five sons and three daughters.

Among their sons were Maury Meiklejohn (1870–1913), who won the Victoria Cross during the Boer War, and Arnold Meiklejohn (1874–1932). The fifth son Lieutenant Hugh Bernard Meiklejohn, Royal Navy, died on 17 May 1902, aged 26.

In 1874 Meiklejohn was appointed as assistant commissioner to the endowed schools commission for Scotland, and made educational suggestions in its report. In 1876 Andrew Bell's trustees instituted a Chair of the theory, history, and practice of education at the University of St Andrews, and Meiklejohn was appointed as the first professor. There he influenced educational ideas at a time when the national system of education was undergoing a reconstruction.

Meiklejohn unsuccessfully contested the Glasgow Tradeston parliamentary constituency as a Gladstonian liberal in 1886. He died at Ashford, Kent, on 5 April 1902, and was buried there.

== Works ==
In 1855 (being 25) Meiklejohn produced for Bohn's Philosophical Library a translation of Kant's Critique of Pure Reason. Between 1862 and 1866 he issued An Essay English Grammar for Beginners, being a Plain Doctrine of Words and Sentences (Manchester, 4 parts). For some years he published his schoolbooks for himself in Paternoster Square. In 1869 he issued, with Adolf Sonnenschein, The English Method of Teaching to Read, and this was followed in 1870 by The Fundamental Error in the Revised Code, with Special Reference to the Problem of Teaching to Read.

Writing numerous school texts and reading books for Blackwood's educational series (1883–7). and similar works, Meiklejohn also published:

- The Book of the English Language (1877);
- The Golden Primer, parts I and II (1884; 1885) with illustrations by Walter Crane.
- Meiklejohn, J.M.D. (1886). The English Language: its Grammar, History, and Literature. London and Edinburgh: William Blackwood and Sons. OCLC 906324620 (all editions).
- The British Empire: its Geography, Resources, Commerce, Land-ways, and Water-ways (1891).

Meiklejohn's series of school books, which was inaugurated in 1894, included a book on Australasia (1897) and The Art of Writing English (1899; 4th edit. 1902). There followed English literature: a New History and Survey from Saxon Times to the Death of Tennyson (posthumous, 1904). His geographical manuals adapted the works of James Cornwell. He also wrote " A New History of England and Great Britain " in two volumes, covering the arrival of Julius Caesar to the death of Queen Victoria.

Meiklejohn also wrote An Old Educational Reformer, Dr. Andrew Bell (Edinburgh, 1881), and he edited the Life and Letters (1883) of William Ballantyne Hodgson. He was a contributor to the Journal of Education and controversialist.

His books, like Meiklejohn 1886 The English Language: its Grammar, History, and Literature are still published, for instance in a 2012 edition, edited by a Fraser McKen in Victoria, Canada.

== Notes ==
Attribution

- This article incorporates text from a publication now in the public domain: Lee, Sidney, ed. (1912). "Meiklejohn, John Miller Dow". Dictionary of National Biography (2nd supplement). Vol. 2. London: Smith, Elder & Co.
