= Andrew Meiklejohn =

Scottish physician (1899–1970)

Andrew Meiklejohn FRCP (1899 – 27 October 1970) was a Scottish respiratory physician, who entered the tuberculosis service, first in Sheffield and subsequently in Manchester, before studying lead poisoning and silicosis in the pottery trade. In 1963 he gave the Milroy Lecture.
