= Mynydd Maendy =

Coordinates: 51.57°N 3.47°W

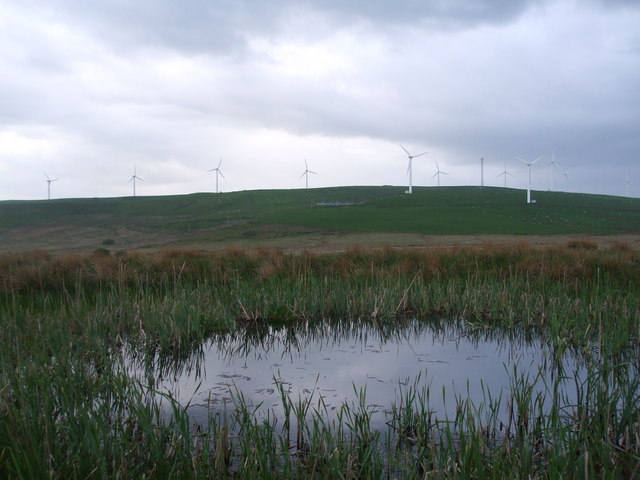
Wind farm on Mynydd Maendy.

Mynydd Maendy (translation: Maindy Mountain) is a hilltop and moorland, near Gilfach Goch, in the County Borough of Rhondda Cynon Taf in south Wales, to the southwest of Tonyrefail. As with the Maindee district of Newport, the name derives from the Welsh maen dy meaning "stone house".

== Location ==
Mynydd Maendy is located about one mile west of the small, former coal mining village of Gilfach Goch in the County Borough of Rhondda Cynon Taf, near the larger community of Tonyrefail. The summit is smoothly rounded and provides rough grazing for sheep.

A wind farm and an Iron Age Celtic hillfort are located on the summit. On a clear day the large turbines of the wind farm can be seen from over 20 miles (32 km) away, and have raised environmental concerns. The wind farm administrative centre is located in nearby Tonyrefail. The wind turbines have been generating renewable energy since 1993 and was one of the first wind farms in the country. Modern turbines are more efficient, and there are proposals for the twenty existing turbines to be removed and replaced by seven larger structures. These more efficient turbines will have the potential to double the amount of energy generated on the site.

The hillfort is a fortified hill top settlement and features on the Register of Landscapes of Special Historic Interest in Wales. It has been described as "the largest undefended Iron Age/Romano-British (800BC-AD410) settlement in southeast Wales", and would have been a place to which the tribe could retreat in times of danger.
