= Maury Meiklejohn =

Recipient of the Victoria Cross (1870–1913)

Maury Meiklejohn VC
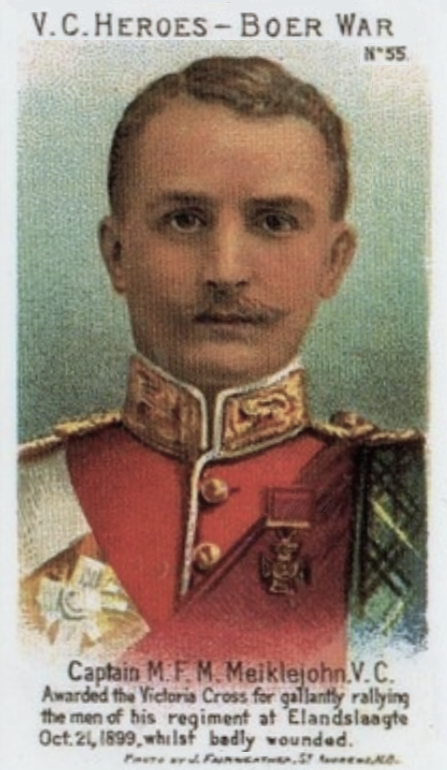
- Meikeljohn on a cigarette card
- Born: 27 November 1870; Clapham, London
- Died: 4 July 1913 (aged 42); Hyde Park, London
- Burial place: Brookwood Cemetery
- Military career
- Allegiance: United Kingdom
- Branch: British Army
- Service years: 1891–1913
- Rank: Major
- Unit: The Gordon Highlanders
- Conflicts: Chitral Expedition; Tirah Campaign; Second Boer War
- Awards: Victoria Cross

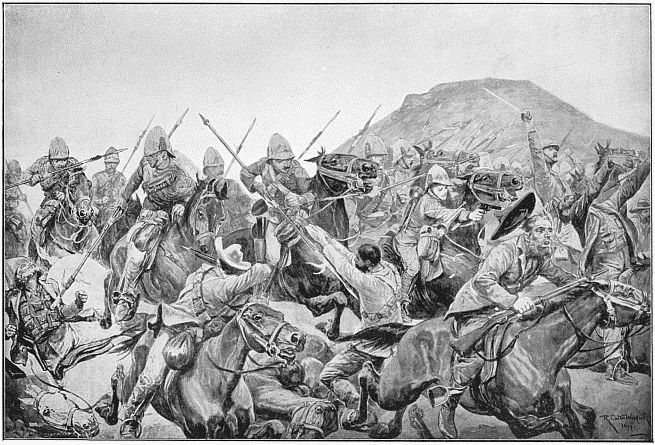
The battle of Elandslaagte

Major Matthew Fontaine Maury Meiklejohn VC (/ˈmiːkəlˌdʒɒn/; 27 November 1870 – 4 July 1913) was a Scottish recipient of the Victoria Cross, the highest and most prestigious award for gallantry in the face of the enemy that can be awarded to British and Commonwealth forces.

== Details ==
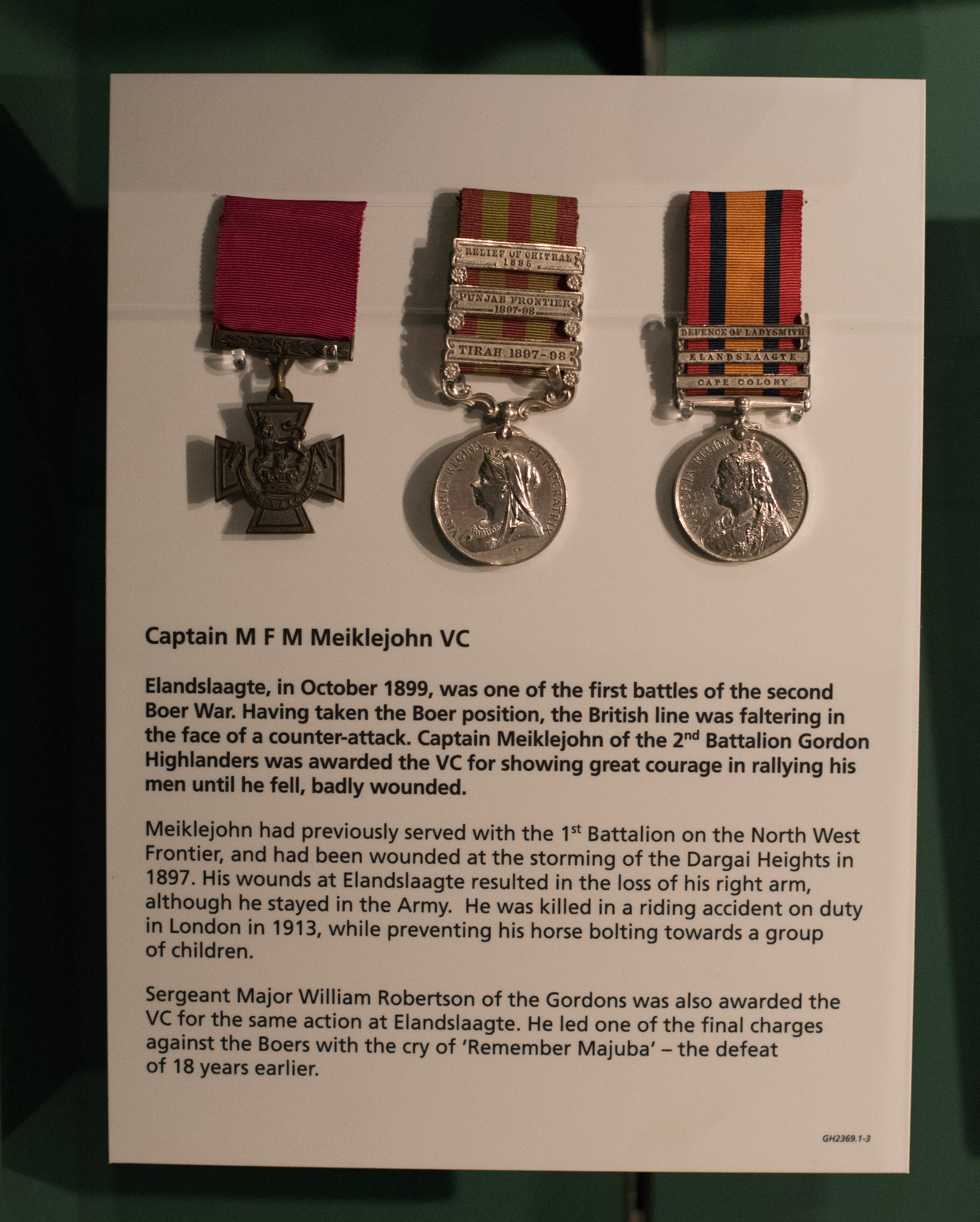
Meiklejohn's medals on display at the Gordon Highlanders Museum.

Meiklejohn was the son of Professor John Meiklejohn, of the University of St. Andrews, and was educated at Madras College and Fettes College. He was a 28 year old captain in the 2nd Battalion, Gordon Highlanders, British Army, during the Second Boer War, when the following deed took place at the Battle of Elandslaagte for which he was awarded the VC.

At the Battle of Elandslaagte on the 21st October, 1899, after the main Boer position had been captured, some men of the Gordon Highlanders, when about to assault a kopje in advance, were exposed to a heavy cross-fire and, having lost their leaders, commenced to waver. Seeing this, Captain Meiklejohn rushed to the front and called on the Gordons to follow him. By his conspicuous bravery and fearless example, he rallied the men and led them against the enemy's position, where he fell, desperately wounded in four places.

His VC action cost him his arm which was amputated. Despite this, he remained in the army as a staff officer. He was seconded from his regiment to attend the Staff College, Camberley, and was promoted to the substantive rank of captain in the Gordon Highlanders on 22 January 1902, and was seconded as a staff officer to Saint Helena. He later achieved the rank of major.

His Victoria Cross is displayed at the Gordon Highlanders Museum along with his campaign medals.

== Death ==
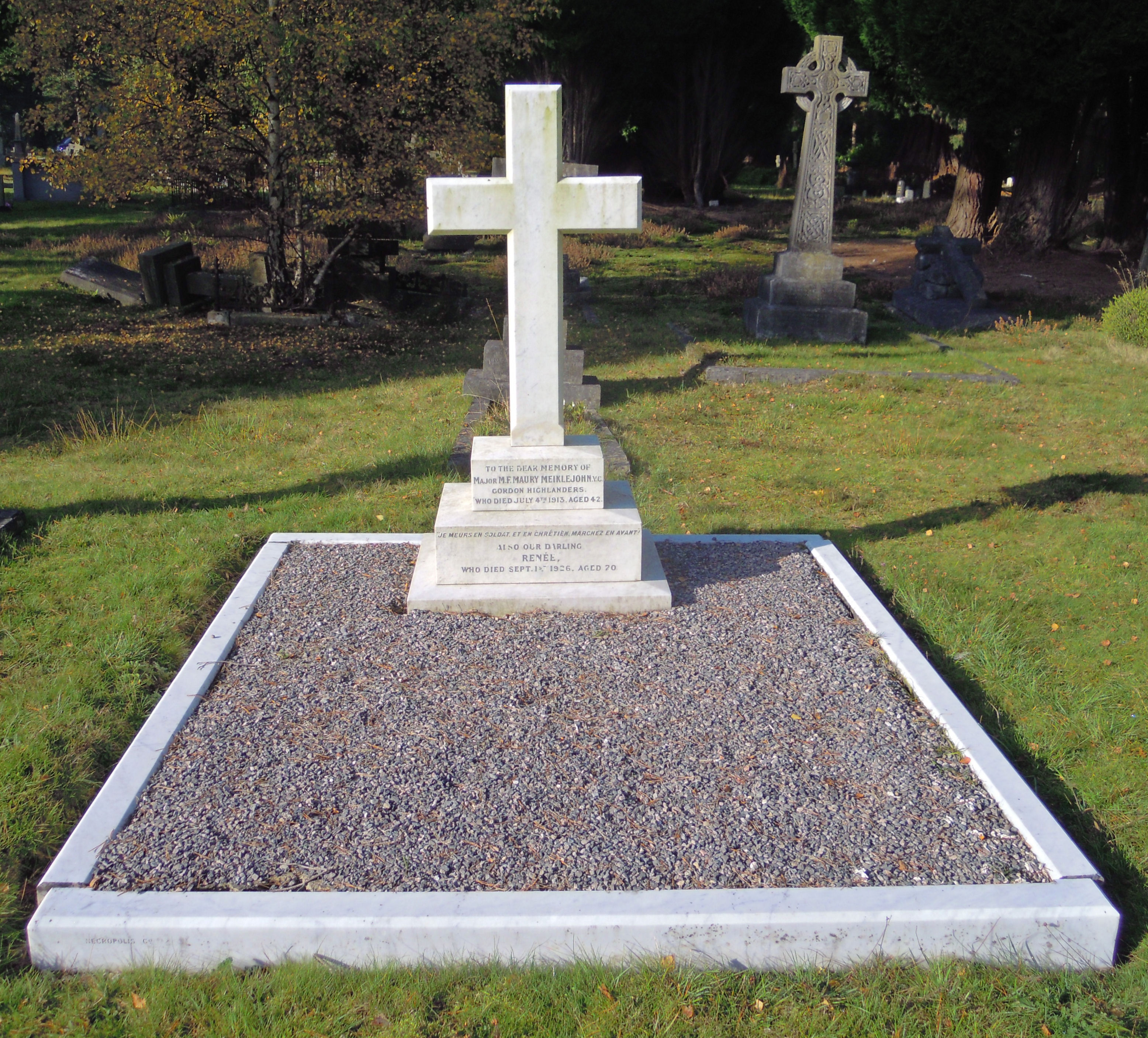
Meiklejohn's grave in Brookwood Cemetery

His death occurred when his horse bolted while he was riding in Hyde Park. With only one arm to control the horse, he chose to steer it into some cast iron railings, to avoid a nursemaid who was pushing a baby in her pram. This was considered an act of high bravery and cost him his life. He died on 4 July 1913 and was given a hero's funeral in Brookwood Cemetery. He is commemorated by a plaque on the wall of Hyde Park Barracks, London.
