= William Williams (doctor) =

Welsh doctor

William Williams (1855 or 1856 – 1911) was a Welsh doctor with a particular interest in issues of sanitation.

== Life ==
Williams was the second son of John Williams of Dolgelly. He matriculated at Jesus College, Oxford in 1877 at the age of 21, holding an Open Scholarship in science and obtained his Bachelor of Arts degree with first-class honours in 1881. He obtained his Bachelor of Medicine and Master of Arts degrees from the University of Oxford in 1887 as a non-collegiate student. Williams also studied in Berlin and at St Mary's Hospital, London, winning scholarships in anatomy, physiology, medical jurisprudence, midwifery and pathology. He became a member of the Royal College of Surgeons and a Licentiate of the Society of Apothecaries in 1887, obtained a Diploma in Public Health in 1888 and was awarded his MD in 1894.

He held the position of president of the Sanitary Inspection Association of South Wales and Monmouthshire as well as public posts in Glamorgan, including School Medical Officer and Director of the County Public Health Laboratory. He also served as president of the South Wales branch of the British Medical Association, and was a Fellow of the Society of Medical Officers of Health and the Royal Sanitary Institute. He was a university examiner, examining in preventive medicine at Oxford and in state medicine at the University of London. In 1904, Williams delivered the Milroy Lectures at the Royal College of Physicians. His works included several publications on sanitation, water supplies and the adulteration of milk, and he helped to trace the cause of an outbreak of typhoid in Clydach to the milk supply. He died in Brighton after a short illness.
