= Tonyrefail =

Village in South Wales

- Community
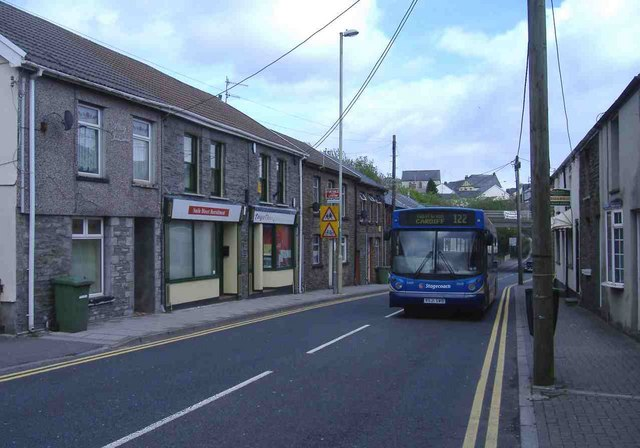

- Location within Rhondda Cynon Taf
- Population: 11,445 (2021)
- OS grid reference: ST009882
  - Cardiff: 14.8 miles Southeast
- Community: Tonyrefail
- Principal area: Rhondda Cynon Taf
- Preserved county: Mid Glamorgan
- Country: Wales
- Sovereign state: United Kingdom
- Post town: PORTH
- Postcode district: CF39
- Dialling code: 01443
- Police: South Wales
- Fire: South Wales
- Ambulance: Welsh
- UK Parliament: Rhondda and Ogmore
- Senedd Cymru – Welsh Parliament: Pontypridd
- List of places UK Wales Rhondda Cynon Taf 51.583973°N 3.430554°W Community map: Map of the community

Tonyrefail (Welsh pronunciation: [tɔnərˈɛvai̯l]) is a village and community in the Rhondda Cynon Taf County Borough, Wales. It is situated at the head of the River Ely, 4 miles (6.4 km) north‑west of Llantrisant, approximately 1.5 miles (2.4 km) from Trebanog, and about 2 miles (3.2 km) from Williamstown. During the second half of the 19th century, when coal and steel became synonymous with the South Wales Valleys, Tonyrefail evolved from a rural hamlet into an industrial village. The population at the 2001 census was 11,035.

== Toponymy ==
Tonyrefail derives from the Welsh Ton yr Efail, meaning 'lay‑land of the smithy', from ton ('lay‑land') and gefail ('smithy').

== History ==
Tonyrefail was a dairy‑farming and livestock‑raising area, and many early farmhouses still exist today. This was in stark contrast to the nearby valleys, which were forced to adopt arable and sheep‑farming activities because of their hilly geography. Early industrialisation began in the late 18th century around a corn mill and a woollen factory, but it was not until deep coal mining began that employment grew on a large scale. At the peak of coal mining in Wales, Coedely Colliery employed nearly 1,800 men, which not only changed the face of Tonyrefail but also led to the establishment of nearby colliery settlements such as Coedely and Bryngolau. Tonyrefail was once a busy town in its own right, as well as serving the communities of Coedely, Trebanog, and Gilfach Goch.

It is widely believed that King Edward II was captured by forces loyal to Queen Isabella near Tonyrefail in 1326.

== Governance ==
At the lowest tier of local government, Tonyrefail elects a community council, Tonyrefail & District Community Council. The community is divided into six community electoral wards: Coedely, Collenna, Penrhiwfer, Thomastown, Tylcha, and Tyn‑y‑Bryn.

The community of Tonyrefail is divided into two county borough wards – Tonyrefail East and Tonyrefail West – for elections to Rhondda Cynon Taf County Borough Council.

== Buildings of note ==
One of the most notable buildings in Tonyrefail is Collenna House, a three‑storey mansion originally built in 1093, which overlooks the village. The house is believed to have been built by the Welsh nobleman Einion ap Collwyn, who, after a dispute with Iestyn ab Gwrgant, married Iestyn's only daughter, Nest. The two are said to have set up home at Collenna House, and it was around this time that they founded the old church of St John. Collenna House would eventually become home to the Prichard family, who trace their lineage back to the house's original Norman occupants. One of the more notable members of the Prichard family, who would eventually die at Collenna House, was the Reverend Richard Prichard, Vicar of Llandaff. His son, John Prichard, was a renowned Welsh architect who was responsible for restoration work at Llandaff Cathedral and many other local churches. To the south‑west is Mynydd Maendy, a hilltop that contains a wind farm; the administrative offices are situated in Tonyrefail.

In May 2013, the listed Savoy Theatre, situated on Collenna Road, received permission from Rhondda Cynon Taf County Borough Council's Development Control Committee to reopen, having been closed for approximately ten years.

== Notable people ==
See Category:People from Tonyrefail

- Boyd Clack – writer, actor, singer, author, poet, and musician
- Alex Davies-Jones – Labour MP for Pontypridd
- Dick Hellings – collier, forward for Llwynypia RFC, and international forward for Wales (1898–1901), who helped secure their Triple Crown win in 1900
- Jeffrey John – Church of England priest and the first openly gay bishop‑designate
- Matthew Rees – Wales and British & Irish Lions international rugby union player
- Vaughan Jones – footballer

== Bibliography ==
- Laffin, Dai (2025). The Tonyrefail Chronicles, The Tonyrefail Chronicles, Volume 2. Amazon.
- Lewis, Dillwyn (1971). A History of Tonyrefail. Risca: The Starling Press Limited.
