= 1925 New Year Honours =

British royal recognitions

The New Year Honours 1925 were appointments by King George V to various orders and honours to reward and highlight good works by members of the British Empire. They were published on 30 December 1924.

The recipients of honours are displayed here as they were styled before their new honour, and arranged by honour, with classes (Knight, Knight Grand Cross, etc.) and then divisions (Military, Civil, etc.) as appropriate.

== British Empire ==
=== Earl ===
- Admiral of the Fleet John Rushworth, Viscount Jellicoe, GCB, OM, GCVO, late Governor General of the Dominion of New Zealand.

=== Baron ===
- Sir John Swanwick Bradbury, GCB, Retiring Principal British Delegate, Reparations Commission.
- The Right Honourable Sir Henry Edward Duke, President of the Probate, Divorce and Admiralty Division.

=== Privy Councillor ===
- The Right Honourable Charles Stewart Henry, Marquis of Londonderry, KG, MVO, Minister of Education, Northern Ireland.

=== Baronet ===
- Henry Cosmo Orme Bonsor, JP, DL, Chairman of Commissioners of Income Tax for the City of London.
- Sir Charles Campbell McLeod, chairman, Royal Colonial Institute.
- The Right Honourable Thomas Francis Molony, formerly Lord Chief Justice of Ireland.

=== Knight Bachelor ===
- Professor John Adams, MA, BSc, LLD, Professor of Education, University of London, 1902–1922.
- Professor Rowland Harry Biffen, , FRS, Professor of Agricultural Botany, Cambridge University.
- William Nicholson Brown, a prominent businessman in Northern Ireland, a public benefactor and a generous supporter of charitable objects.
- John Campbell, MA, MD, MCh, FRCS, LLD, Senior Surgeon to the Samaritan Hospital for Women, Belfast. Member of Parliament (Northern Ireland) representing Queens University.
- Richard James Coles, CBE, Financial Assistant Secretary, Ministry of Pensions.
- Robert William Dibdin, JP, President of the Law Society, 1923–1924.
- Francis Bernard Dicksee, ABA, Artist.
- Edmund Gosse, CB, LLD, DLitt.
- William Bate Hardy, MA, FBS, Secretary of the Royal Society.
- Professor Frederick Gowland Hopkins, MA, DSc, FRCP, FRBS, Professor of Bio-Chemistry, University of Cambridge.
- James Colquhoun Irvine, CBE, LLD, DSc, FRS, Principal and Vice Chancellor of the University of St Andrews.
- Harry Philip Parnell Lane, CBE, MVO, Chief Constable of Lancashire.
- Thomas Morison Legge, CBE, MD, DPH, H.M. Senior Medical Inspector of Factories.
- Benjamin Longbottom, chairman, British Electrical and Allied Manufacturers Association.
- Andrew McFadyean, formerly General Secretary, Reparations Commission; now Controller of German Assigned Revenues under the Dawes Scheme.
- The Right Honourable James O'Connor, formerly a Lord Justice of Appeal in Ireland.
- Ernest Willoughby Petter, President, British Engineers Association.
- Colonel John Wallace Pringle, CB, Chief Inspecting Officer of Railways, Ministry of Transport.
- Councillor Arnold Rushton, JP, Ex-Lord Mayor of Liverpool.
- Wasey Sterry, CBE, Legal Secretary to the Sudan Government.
- Holburt Jacob Waring, CBE, MS, BSc, FRCS, Senior Surgeon, St Bartholomew's Hospital, Vice President, Royal College of Surgeons, Vice Chancellor of the University of London, 1922–1924.

India

- Khan Bahadur Mian Fazl-i-Husain, Minister for Education, Punjab.
- William John Keith, CIE, Indian Civil Service, Finance Member of the Executive Council, Burma.
- Harry Evan Auguste Cotton, CIE, President, Bengal Legislative Council.
- Mr. Justice Charles Gordon Spencer, Indian Civil Service, Puisne Judge, High Court of Judicature, Madras.
- Mr. Justice George Claus Rankin, Puisne Judge, High Court of Judicature, Calcutta.
- Major-General Robert Charles MacWatt, CIE, Director-General, Indian Medical Service.
- Geoffrey Rothe Clarke, CSI, OBE, Indian Civil Service, Director-General, Posts and Telegraphs.
- Hari Singh Gour, DLitt, DCL, LLD, Vice Chancellor, Delhi University.
- Lieutenant-Colonel Cecil Kaye, CSI, CIE, CBE, Indian Army, Director of the Intelligence Bureau.
- Frederick St John Gebbie, CIE, Consulting Engineer to the Government of India.
- Sidney Ashley Hurt Sitwell, London Manager of the Imperial Bank of India.
- Rao Bahadur Raghunath Venkaji Sabnis, CIE, Dewan of the Kolhapur State, Bombay.
- William Crawford Currie, Senior Partner of Messrs Mackinnon, Mackenzie & Co., Calcutta.
- Alexander Maclean MacDougall, Partner, Messrs Simpson & Co., and Sheriff of Madras.
- John Cuthbert Grenside Bowen, Government Solicitor and Public Prosecutor, Bombay, and Registrar of the Bombay Diocese.
- Mahomedbhoy Hajibhoy, Merchant, Bombay.
- William Foster, CIE, Historiographer, India Office.

Dominions, Colonies, Protectorates

- Alfred Henry Ashbolt, lately Agent-General in London for the State of Tasmania.
- The Honourable David John Gordon, formerly Member of the House of Representatives of the Commonwealth of Australia; for services rendered to the Commonwealth.
- Frederick Truby King, CMG, MB, Director of the Child Welfare Division of the Department of Health, Dominion of New Zealand.
- James Lochore, Member of the Executive Council of the Island of Ceylon; in recognition of his public services.
- Philip James Macdonell, BCL, Judge of the High Court of Northern Rhodesia.
- Alfred Parker Sherlock, Member of the Executive Council of the Colony of British Guiana; in recognition of his public services.
- Thomas Symonds Tomlinson, Judge of His Britannic Majesty's Court for Zanzibar.

=== Order of the Bath ===
==== Knight Commander of the Order of the Bath (KCB) ====
Military Division

Royal Navy

- Vice-Admiral the Honourable Victor Albert Stanley, CB, MVO.
- Paymaster Rear-Admiral Charles Fleetwood Pollard, CB, CMG.

Army

- Major-General (Honorary Lieutenant-General) Sir George Tom Molesworth Bridges, KCMG, CB, DSO, Colonel 5th Dragoon Guards, retired pay.
- Major-General Sir Archibald Armar Montgomery, KCMG, CB, General Officer Commanding, 1st Division, Aldershot Command.
- Lieutenant-General Thomas Edwin Scott, CB, CIE, DSO, Indian Army, Colonel, The Royal Irish Fusiliers (Princess Victorias), and 13th Frontier Force Rifles, General Officer Commanding and Political Resident, Aden.
- Lieutenant-General Sir Andrew Skeen, KCIE, CB, CMG, Indian Army, Chief of the General Staff, India.

Civil Division

- Colonel Henry Clayton Darlington, CB, CMG, TD, Territorial Army.
- Brigadier-General Sir Douglas Frederick Rawdon Dawson, GCVO, CB, CMG.

==== Companion of the Order of the Bath (CB) ====
Military Division

Royal Navy

- Rear-Admiral Vernon Harry Stuart Haggard, CMG.
- Rear-Admiral Frank Larken, CMG.
- Engineer Rear-Admiral Lewis Jones Watson, OBE.
- Captain Leonard Andrew Boyd Donaldson, CMG.

Army

- Major-General Sebert Francis St Davids Green, CBE, MD, KHP, late Royal Army Medical Corps, deputy director of Medical Services, Western Command, India.
- Colonel (Temporary Colonel Commandant) Granville George Loch, CMG, CBE, DSO, Brigade Commander, 1st Indian Infantry Brigade, India.
- Colonel Ernest Vere Turner, CMG, DSO, late Chief Signal Officer, The British Troops in Egypt.
- Colonel Cyril Lachlan Porter, CMG, DSO, Chief Instructor (Assistant Commandant), Senior Officers' School, Belgaum.
- Colonel William Henry Loraine Allgood, CMG, DSO, Brigade Commander, 146th (1st West Riding) Infantry Brigade.
- Colonel George Mostyn Williams, CMG, deputy director of Veterinary Services, Aldershot Command.
- Major-General Charles Alexander Campbell Godwin, CMG, DSO, Indian Army, Colonel, 11th Prince Albert Victor's Own Cavalry (Frontier Force), Inspector-General of Cavalry, Headquarters Staff of the Army in India.
- Major-General Harold John Kinahan Bamfield, DSO, KHP, Indian Medical Service, deputy director of Medical Services, Eastern Command, India.
- Colonel (Temporary Colonel Commandant) Gilbert Robert Cassels, DSO, Indian Army, Brigade Commander, 20th Indian Infantry Brigade.
- Colonel (Temporary Colonel Commandant) Digby Inglis Shuttleworth, CBE, DSO, Indian Army, Commander, Jullundur Brigade Area.

Royal Air Force

- Air Commodore Arthur Murray Longmore, DSO.

Civil Division

- Leopold Halliday Savile, MICE, AINA, Civil Engineer-in-Chief, Admiralty.
- Colonel Arthur Maxwell, CMG, DSO, TD, Territorial Army (Honorary Colonel, 7th/City of London Regiment (Post Office Rifles), Territorial Army).

=== Order of Merit (OM) ===
- Sir James George Frazer, FRS.
- Sir Ernest Rutherford, FRS.

=== Order of the Star of India ===
==== Knight Grand Commander of the Order of the Star of India (GCSI) ====
- The Right Honourable Arthur Hamilton, Viscount Lee of Fareham, GBE, KCB.

==== Knight Commander of the Order of the Star of India (KCSI) ====
- Captain His Highness Maharana Shri Vijayasinhji Chhatrasinhji, Maharaja of Rajpipla.
- Sir Frederick Augustus Nicholson, KCIE, Indian Civil Service (retired), Madras.

==== Companion of the Order of the Star of India (CSI) ====
- David Thomas Chadwick, CIE, Indian Civil Service, Secretary to the Government of India, Commerce Department.
- Malcolm Edward Couchman, Indian Civil Service, First Member of the Board of Revenue, Madras.
- Frederick Greville Pratt, Indian Civil Service, Commissioner, Northern Division, Bombay Presidency.
- Ralph Oakden, OBE, Indian Civil Service, Commissioner, United Provinces.
- Egbert Laurie Lucas Hammond, CBE, Indian Civil Service, Chief Secretary to the Government of Bihar and Orissa.

=== Order of Saint Michael and Saint George ===
==== Knight Grand Cross of the Order of St Michael and St George (GCMG) ====
- Sir Henry Hesketh Joudou Bell, KCMG, lately Governor of Mauritius.
- Sir Francis Alexander Newdigate Newdegate, KCMG, lately Governor of the State of Western Australia.

==== Knight Commander of the Order of St Michael and St George (KCMG) ====
- Sir Solomon Dias Bandaranaike, Kt, CMG, Maha Mudaliyar of Ceylon, in recognition of his services to the Government of Ceylon.
- The Honourable Sir Charles Patrick John Coghlan, Kt, Premier of Southern Rhodesia.
- John Hubert Plunkett Murray, CMG, Lieutenant-Governor of the Territory of Papua.
- The Honourable Christopher James Parr, CMG, Minister of Education, Minister of Justice and Minister in Charge of Police & Prisons Departments, Dominion of New Zealand.
- The Honourable Ronald Charles Lindsay, CB, CVO, His Majesty's High Commissioner at Constantinople.
- Basil Shillito Cave, CB, His Majesty's Consul-General at Algiers.
- Basil Alfred Kemball-Cook, CB, Assistant British Delegate, Reparation Commission, Paris.

==== Companion of the Order of St Michael and St George (CMG) ====
- Wilberforce John James Arnold, MB, Colonial Surgeon, Saint Helena.
- William Cattanach, Chairman of the State Rivers and Water Supply Commission, State of Victoria.
- Captain Arthur Randolph Wormeley Curtis, MC, in recognition of his services as Private Secretary to the Governor-General of New Zealand.
- Edwin Richard Hallifax, CBE, Secretary for Chinese Affairs, Hong Kong.
- John Gilbert Maclaren, Secretary to the Department of Home and Territories, Commonwealth of Australia.
- Frank Milner, Rector of Waitaki Boys' High School, Oamaru, in recognition of his services to Education in New Zealand.
- Captain Charles Wolfran Round-Turner, Royal Navy, for services rendered in connection with the recent Empire Cruise of the Special Service Squadron of the Royal Navy.
- Major Upton FitzHerbert Ruxton, Senior Resident in charge of the Southern portion of the British Sphere of the Cameroons.
- Salisbury Stanley Spurling, OBE, Member of the House of Assembly of Bermuda, and for many years Member of the Executive Council of that Colony.
- Captain John Bryan Stevenson, Royal Australian Navy, Naval Representative on the Staff of the High Commissioner in London for the Commonwealth of Australia, for services rendered as Captain of HMAS Adelaide, which accompanied the Special Service Squadron of the Royal Navy during its recent Empire Cruise.
- Orme Garton Sargent, a First Secretary at His Majesty's Embassy, Paris.

Honorary Member

- Sultan Mehdi bin Ali, of Lahej.

=== Order of the Indian Empire ===
==== Knight Commander of the Order of the Indian Empire (KCIE) ====
- Atul Chandra Chatterjee, CBE, Indian Civil Service, lately Member of the Executive Council of the Governor-General, and High Commissioner for India designate.
- Robert Erskine Holland, CSI, CIE, CVO, Indian Civil Service, Agent to the Governor-General, Rajputana.
- Sir Maneckji Byramji Dadabhoy, CIE, Member of the Council of State.
- George Rainy, CSI, CIE, Indian Civil Service, President, Tariff Board.

==== Companion of the Order of the Indian Empire (CIE) ====
- George Drury Rudkin, OBE, Indian Civil Service, lately Revenue Member, State Council, Bikaner, Rajputana.
- Rao Bahadur Thakur Mangal Singh of Pokaran, Member of Council, Jodhpur State, Rajputana.
- M.R.Ry Diwan Bahadur Pattu Kesava Pillai Avargal, President, District Board, Anantapur, and Deputy President, Madras Legislative Council.
- Alexander Robert Loftus Tottenham, Indian Civil Service, Senior Member of the Central Board of Revenue.
- Alfred Alan Lethbridge Parsons, Indian Civil Service, Officiating Financial Commissioner, Railway Board.
- Frederick Charles Turner, Indian Civil Service, Commissioner, Berar Division, Central Provinces.
- John Arthur Laing Swan, Indian Civil Service, Secretary to the Government of Bengal in the Department of Education.
- Herbert George Billson, Chief Conservator of Forests, and Member of the Legislative Council, United Provinces.
- Colonel Clement Henry Bensley, Indian Medical Service, Inspector-General of Civil Hospitals and Prisons, Assam.
- Ernest George Turner, Indian Civil Service, chairman, Improvement Trust, Bombay.
- Thomas George Rutherford, Indian Civil Service, Acting Collector and District Magistrate, Madras.
- Major George Drummond Ogilvie, Deputy Secretary to the Government of India, Foreign and Political Department.
- Lieutenant-Colonel Edward Cecil Gordon Maddock, MD, Indian Medical Service, late Civil Surgeon, Poona, Bombay.
- Frederick Anderson, Officiating Superintending Engineer, Public Works Department, Irrigation Branch, United Provinces.
- George Cunningham, OBE, Indian Civil Service, Political Department, North-West Frontier Province.
- Major Clive Kirkpatrick Daly, Political Agent, Bahrein, Persian Gulf.
- Lieutenant-Colonel Joseph Charles Stoelke Vaughan, Indian Medical Service (retired), Superintendent, Radium Institute, Ranchi, Bihar and Orissa.
- Francis Colomb Crawford, OBE, Deputy Director-General of Police, Criminal Investigation Department, His Exalted Highness the Nizam's Government, Hyderabad (Deccan).
- Hubert Calvert, Indian Civil Service, Registrar of Co-operative Societies, Punjab.
- U Me, ISO, Deputy Commissioner, Prome, Burma.
- Lieutenant-Colonel the Reverend William Thomas Wright, VD (late Commandant, Punjab Rifles), Principal, Lawrence Royal Military School, Ghora Gali, Punjab.
- Rai Bahadur Gyanendra Chandra Ghose, Zamindar and Honorary Presidency Magistrate, Bengal.
- Rai Bahadur Sukhamaya Chaudhuri, Zamindar and Honorary Magistrate, Sylhet, Assam.
- Diwan Bahadur Tiruvenkata Rangachariar, Deputy President, Legislative Assembly; Member of Colonies Committee.
- Walter Lancelot Travers, OBE, Manager, Baradighi Tea Estate, Jalpaiguri, and Member, Legislative Council, Bengal.
- Sardar Bahadur Sardar Jawahir Singh, of Mustafabad, Jagirdar, Honorary Magistrate, Ambala District, and Member of Legislative Assembly, Punjab
- Lieutenant (Local Captain) Hissam-Ud-Din Bahadur, Indian Army, Adjutant, 12th Frontier Force Regiment (ITF), Honorary ADC to His Excellency the Commander-in-Chief.
- Khan Bahadur Shah Nawaz Khan Bhutto, OBE, Zamindar and President, District Local Board, Larkana, Sind, Bombay.

=== Royal Victorian Order ===
==== Knight Grand Cross of the Royal Victorian Order (GCVO) ====
- The Right Honourable Weetman Dickinson, Viscount Cowdray.
- Sir Aston Webb, KCVO, CB.

==== Knight Commander of the Royal Victorian Order (KCVO) ====
- Sir Frederick Morton Radcliffe.
- Henry John Forbes Simson, FRCS, obstetrician to Royal family.

==== Commander of the Royal Victorian Order (CVO) ====
- Colonel Jacynth d'Ewes Fitz-Ercald Coke, CMG (Dated 20 August 1924).
- Major Reginald Henry Seymour, MVO.
- Captain Augustus Frederick Liddell, MVO.
- Herbert Arthur Previté Trendell, MVO, OBE (Dated 29 July 1924).
- Stuart Kelson Brown.

==== Member of the Royal Victorian Order, 4th class (MVO) ====
- Major James Douglas Ramsay.
- Captain Lawrence Franklin Burgis.
- Hugh Killingworth Punshon, MVO (5th Class).
- Walter Rangeley Maitland Lamb.

==== Member of the Royal Victorian Order, 5th class (MVO) ====
- Austin Harry Lester Hertslet.

=== Order of the British Empire ===
==== Dame Grand Cross of the Order of the British Empire (GBE) ====
Civil Division

- Ellen Alice Carew (Ellen Terry).
- Millicent Garrett Fawcett, JP.

==== Dame Commander of the Order of the British Empire (DBE) ====
Civil Division

- Louisa Brandreth Aldrich-Blake, MS, MD, Dean of the London School of Medicine for Women.

=== Kaisar-i-Hind Medal ===
First Class, for Public Services in India

- Maharani Parbati Devi of Sonpur, Bihar and Orissa.
- Mary Theodora Schofield, Chief Lady Superintendent in India, Sandes Soldiers' Homes.
- Dewan Behadur Calapatti Srikanteswara Iyer, retired Inspector-General of Police, Mysore State.
- M.R.Ry Diwan Bahadur Valuthur Krishna Ayyangar Bamanuja Achariyar Avargal, Madras Provincial Civil Service (retired).
- Sorabji Cowasji Hormusji, MD, First Assistant Health Officer, Bombay.
- John Robert Baird-Smith, Irrawaddy Flotilla Company, Burma.
- Henry Tristram Holland, Medical Officer of the Church Missionary Society, Baluchistan.
- Mrs. Grant Stait, MD, Medical Missionary, American Baptist Mission, Udayagiri, Nellore District, Madras.
- Alice Mary Hawker, Lady Missionary, Jiaganj, Murshidabad District, Bengal.
- Solomon Smith, Ensign, Salvation Army, Najibabad, United Provinces.

=== Air Force Cross (AFC) ===
- Flight Lieutenant Rollo Amyatt de Haga Haig.
- Flying Officer Eustace Jack Linton Hope.

=== Air Force Medal (AFM) ===
- 240216 Sergeant Jackson Sydney Brett.

=== King's Police Medal (KPM) ===
England & Wales

Police

- Major St Andrew Bruce Warde, Chief Constable, Hampshire Constabulary.
- Captain Mowbray Lees Sant, Chief Constable, Surrey Constabulary.
- Richard Jones, Chief Constable, Merionethshire Constabulary.
- Martin Nicholls, Chief Constable, Warrington Borough Police.
- Eric Herbert Spence, Chief Constable, Carlisle City Police.
- Captain Charles Edmund Gower, Chief Constable, Newport Borough Police.
- John Devine, OBE, Superintendent, Metropolitan Police.
- Albert Lawrence, late Superintendent, Metropolitan Police.
- Edward John Clarke, Superintendent, Warwickshire Constabulary.
- George Richard Pilliner, Chief Superintendent, Staffordshire Constabulary.
- Albert Waghorn, Superintendent and Deputy Chief Constable, East Sussex Constabulary.
- Stephen Hudson, Constable, Lancashire Constabulary.
- James Clow, Constable, Lincolnshire Constabulary.
- Edmund Frederick Carter, Constable, Somerset Constabulary.
- James Tuck, Constable, City of London Police.
- William John Brooking, Constable, Cornwall Constabulary.
- Albert Thomas, Constable, Salford Borough Police.
- George Fisher, Constable; Metropolitan Police.
- Robert Harding, Constable, Metropolitan Police.
- Harold Peckover, Constable, Metropolitan Police.
- Percival Norman, Constable, Metropolitan Police.
- Harold Vincent, Constable, Metropolitan Police.

Fire Brigade

- Henry Neal, Chief Officer, Leicester Fire Brigade.

Scotland

- John Carmichael, Chief Constable, Dundee City Police.
- Hugh Calder; Superintendent, Edinburgh City Police.
- James Ferguson, Superintendent, Glasgow City Police.
- John Campbell, Sergeant, Ross and Cromarty Constabulary.
- John Crawford, Constable, Stirlingshire Constabulary.
- William Weighland Ramsay, Constable, Edinburgh City Police.

Northern Ireland

- Patrick Cahill, District Inspector, Royal Ulster Constabulary.
- Thomas Nicholas Bridgham, Head Constable, Royal Ulster Constabulary.
- John Francis Maguire, Sergeant, Royal Ulster Constabulary.

India

- Vaithyanathier Natesa Ayyar, Inspector, Madras Police.
- Abdul Gaffur, Jemadar, East Coast Special Police, Madras Police.
- Robert Hume, Assistant Superintendent, Madras Police.
- Edakkudi Venkatachala Ayyar Krishnaswami Ayyar, Acting Inspector, Madras Police.
- Rao Sahib Kanthadai Bangaswami Ayyangar, Acting Deputy Superintendent, Madras Police.
- Shahbux, Constable, Bombay Police.
- Ganpat Vishram Tawde, Constable, Bombay City Police.
- Murid Wali Mahomed Khoso, Head Constable, Bombay Police.
- Sayad Sardar Ali, Sub-Inspector, Hyderabad State Police.
- Charles William Condon, Inspector, Bombay Police.
- Amir Bahim, Sub-Inspector, Bombay Police.
- Vaikunthrai Vithalrai Kikani, Sub-Inspector, Baroda State Police.
- H. G. Lang, Superintendent, Agency Police, Kathiawar.
- Hari Narayan Pimple, Temporary Deputy Superintendent, Bombay Police.
- Syeduddin Ahmad, Sub-Inspector, Bengal Police.
- Satish Chandra Chakrabatti, Officiating Sub-Inspector, Calcutta Police.
- Sheikh Abdul Karim Constable, Calcutta Police.
- Muhammad Syed Ali, Sub-Inspector, Bengal Police.
- Percival Clifford Bamford, Superintendent, Bengal Police.
- Arthur Durham Ashdown, Officiating Inspector-General, United Provinces Police.
- Munir Hussain, Head Constable, United Provinces Police.
- Ali Mirza, Sub-Inspector, United Provinces Police.
- Narayan Singh, Head Constable, United Provinces Police.
- Brahma Narayan Awasthi, Sub-Inspector, United Provinces Police.
- William Norman Prentrice Jenkin, Assistant Superintendent, United Provinces Police.
- Agha Ahmad Said, Inspector, Punjab Police.
- Chaudhri Mahmud Khan, Sub-Inspector, Punjab Police.
- Mehta Ishar Dass, Sub-Inspector, Punjab Police.
- Harry Bivett Cecil Guise, MC, Officiating Superintendent, Bihar and Orissa Police.
- James Edgar Pearman, Assistant Superintendent, Bihar and Orissa Police.
- Habib Khan, Sowar, Military Police, Bihar and Orissa.
- Baj Balam Tewari, Constable, Bihar and Orissa Police.
- Maung Po Saung, KSM, TDM, Deputy Superintendent, Burma Police.
- Edward Brown, Deputy Superintendent, Burma Police.
- Mohamed Khan, Subadar, Burma Military Police.
- David Alexander Smyth, Superintendent, Central Provinces Police.
- William Charles Michael Dundas, CIE, Inspector General, Assam Police.
- Kainbir Limbu, Subadar, Assam Rifles.
- Jegatser Limbu, Jemadar, Assam Rifles.
- Surbir Ale, Jemadar, Assam Rifles.
- Said Akbar Khan, Inspector, North-West Frontier Province Police.
- Wali Muhammad Khan, Sub-Inspector, North-West Frontier Province Police.
- Yaran Khan, Head Constable, North-West Frontier Province Police.
- Khan Bahadur, Officiating Sub-Inspector, North-West Frontier Province Police.
- Gokal Singh, Lance Head Constable, North-West Frontier Province Police.
- Ibrahim, Lance Head Constable, North-West Frontier Province Police.
- Gul Zaman, Foot Constable, North-West Frontier Province Police.

Bar to the Kings Police Medal

- Karumathil Krishna Panikkar, Subadar, Malabar Special Police, Madras Police.
- Hugh Otway de Gale, Superintendent, Punjab Police.
- Arthur Finch Perrott, Superintendent, North West Frontier Province Police.

British Oversea Dominions, Colonies, Protectorates & Mandated Territories

- Barend Hermanus Niemandt, Lance Sergeant, South African Police.
- Robert Patrick Arnold, Constable, South African Police.
- Sigcau Dhlamini, Native Constable, South African Police.
- Daniel Albertus Johannes van Heerden, First Class Constable, South African Police.
- Robert Henry Ker, Detective Head Constable, South African Police.
- Ernest Edward Ascott Evans, Detective Head Constable, South African Police.
- Captain Oscar Steen, Chief Inspector, Railways and Harbours Police, Union of South Africa.
- Andries Johannes Hoffmann, Detective Head Constable, South African Police.
- Hendrik Josephus van der Westhuizen, First Class Constable, South African Police.
- Cyril Clifford Jurd, Constable, New South Wales Police Force.
- Edward Smith, Principal Electrician, Board of Fire Commissioners of New South Wales.
- Timothy Murphy, Inspector, Hong Kong Police.
- William Lance Conlay, CBE, Commissioner of Police, Federated Malay States.
- Lieutenant-Colonel Albert Ernest Gallagher, DSO, Chief Commandant of Police and Inspector of Prisons, Cyprus.
- Kaimakam William Daniel Blake Bey, Superintendent, Fire Brigade, Cairo City Police.

=== Promotions ===
Royal Navy

Dated 31 December 1924.

Commander to Captain

- Egerton W. Isaacson.
- Evelyn C. O. Thomson, DSO.
- Lionel V. Wells, DSO.
- Albert J. Robertson.
- William B. Mackenzie.
- Gerald C. Harrison.
- Alfred H. Taylor, OBE.
- Ralph Leatham.
- Stephen St. L. Moore.
- Francis H. Sandford, DSO.

Lieutenant-Commander to Commander

- Walter H. G. Fallowfield.
- Sir John M. Alleyne, Bt, DSO, DSC.
- Reginald A. Jackson.
- Hugh S. Bowlby.
- Arthur R. Farquhar, DSC.
- Edward C. Denison.
- Hubert G. D. Acland, DSO.
- Oswald E. Hallifax, DSO.
- Paul F. P. Berryman.
- Eric J. Shelley.
- Arthur F. E. Palliser, DSC.
- Philip L. Neville.
- George H. Creswell, DSC.
- Geoffrey J. A. Miles.
- Frederick R. M. Johnson.
- Patrick Butter.
- Frederick H. G. Dalrymple-Hamilton.
- Cedric S. Holland.
- Godfrey G. C. Crookshank.
- Denis W. Boyd, DSC.

Engineer-Commander to Engineer Captain

- Harold A. Brown.

Engineer Lieutenant-Commander to Engineer Commander

- Robert C. Grigg.
- William D. Strachan-Smith.
- Frank B. Minhinnick.
- Albert E. Francis.
- John L. Deacon.
- James T. Webber.
- James P. Johns.
- Donald J. Weeks.
- David P. Rowland.
- Harry H. Wilson.
- Leslie W. Robinson.
- Dennis J. Hoare.
- John H. Breaks.

Paymaster Commander to Paymaster Captain

- William F. Cullinan, CMG.
- Augustus P. Hughes (To date 1 January 1925).

Royal Marines

Major to Lieutenant-Colonel

- Richard F. C. Foster, CMG, DSO.

Royal Naval Reserve

Lieutenant-Commander to Commander

- Robert McMurray, RD.
- Charles H. Bate, RD.
- John C. Townley.
- Herbert J. Giles, RD.
- David J. Roberts, RD.
- Robert S. Hulme-Goodier, OBE, RD.
- Arthur L. Owens, RD.
- Reginald S. Ward, RD.

Royal Air Force

With effect from 1 January 1925.

General Duties Branch

Air Commodore to Air Vice-Marshal

- Charles Laverock Lambe, CB, CMG, DSO.
- John Miles Steel, CB, CMG, DSO.

Group Captain to Air Commodore.

- Cyril Louis Norton Newall, CMG, CBE, AM, ADC.
- Robert Gordon, CB, CMG, DSO.

Wing Commander to Group Captain

- Christopher Lloyd Courtney, CBE, DSO.
- Sacheverell Arthur Hebden, OBE.
- Lionel Wilmot Brabazon Rees, VC, OBE, MC, AFC.

Squadron Leader to Wing Commander

- Edward Osmond, CBE.
- Alfred Horace Steel Steele-Perkins, OBE.
- William Sholto Douglas, MC, DFC.
- Paul Copeland Maltby, DSO, AFC.
- Edward Lancelot Tomkinson, DSO, AFC.
- Douglas Claude Strathern Evill, DSC, AFC.
- Rowland Francis Storrs Morton.
- Trafford Leigh Leigh-Mallory, DSO.
- Sir Norman Roderick Alexander David Leslie, Bt, CBE.

Flight Lieutenant to Squadron Leader

- John Reginald Howett.
- Eric Miller Pollard.
- Hugh Edmund Fowler Wyncoll, OBE, MC.
- Claude Alward Ridley, DSO, MC.
- George Clark Pirie, MC, DFC.
- Charles Ernest Hilton James, MC.
- William Whidden Hart, MBE.
- John Hilliard Simpson.
- Geoffrey Henry Hall, AFC.
- Arthur Francis Brooke.
- John Cotesworth Slessor, MC.
- William Douglas Budgen, OBE.
- John Joseph Breen.
- Patrick Huskinson, MC.
- Alfred Price Maurice, DFC.
- Lionel Guy Stanhope Payne, MC, AFC.
- Theodore Quintus Studd, DFC.
- Claud William Mackey.
- John Lyne Vachell, MC.
- Henry Dawes, MBE.

Flying Officer to Flight Lieutenant

- William Vazie Simons.
- Geoffrey William Hemming, DSC.
- Harold Alan Hamersley, MC.
- Richard Douglas Starley, MC.
- Harry Noel Cornforth Robinson, MC, DFC.
- Alfred Douglas Rogers, AFC.
- Lambert Eardley-Wilmot.
- Frederick Harry Isaac, DFC.
- John Douglas Stirling Denholm.
- John Mary Joseph Charles James Ivan Rock de Besombes.
- John Augustus Holm.
- Norman Cuthbert Saward.
- Frederick Charles Boughton Greene.
- Harold Charles Calvey.
- Cyril Ferdinand Briggs.
- Colin Peter Brown, DFC.
- Dudley d'Herbez Humphreys.
- Stanley Miles Park.
- Francis Herbert Donald Henwood, DFC.
- Gerald Gladstone Walker, MC.
- Charles Francis Toogood.
- Basil Royston Carter, AFC.
- William Neville Cumming.
- William John Umpleby.
- James Bernard Allen.
- Francis Harbroe Shales.
- Eustace Jack Linton Hope.
- William Vincent Hyde.
- Gerald Stanley Shaw.
- George Birkett.
- William Ernest Staton, MC, DFC.
- James Theodore Paine.
- Kenneth Lenton Boswell.
- Alan Patrick Ritchie, AFC.
- William Noble Plenderleith.
- Archibald James Rankin.
- William Robert Bathurst Annesley.
- Alexander Paul Davidson.

Stores Branch

Flying Officer to Flight Lieutenant

- Charles Herbert Pownall.
- Thomas James Organ.
- Charles Herbert Masters.
- Patrick Francis Connaughton.
- Harry Joe Barnham.

Accountant Branch

Squadron Leader to Wing Commander

- Charles Geoffrey Murray, OBE.

Flying Officer to Flight Lieutenant

- Arthur Egbert Vautier, MC.

Medical Branch

Squadron Leader to Wing Commander

- Thomas Stanley Rippon, OBE.

Squadron Leader to honorary Wing Commander

- Edgar Huntley, MB, BS.

Flight Lieutenant to Squadron Leader

- John Turnbull Thomson Forbes.
- James Kyle.

Flight Lieutenant to honorary Squadron Leader

- Williamson Rust Reith, MD, AM.
- James William Hancock Steil, MB.

Princess Mary's Royal Air Force Nursing Service

Acting Senior Sister to Senior Sister

- Maggie Moddrel.

Sister to Senior Sister

- Catherine Emma Jenkins.
- Emily Mathieson Blair.

Sister to acting Senior Sister

- Evelyn Rose James.

Staff Nurse to Acting Sister

- Kate Maud Beall.
