= Graystone Bird =

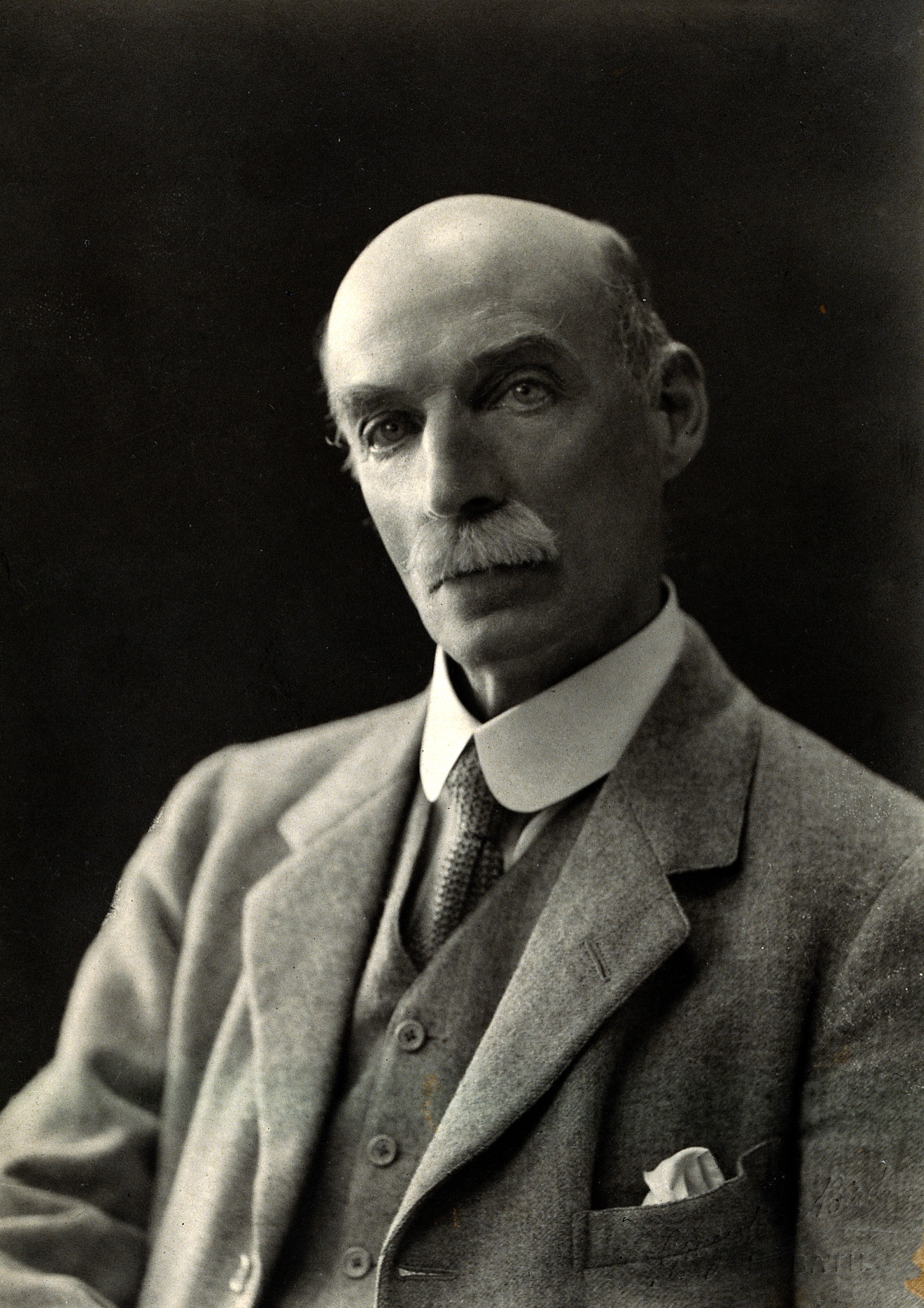
Thomas Morison Legge, photograph by Graystone Bird

Owen Graystone Bird (1862–1943) was a British professional photographer, active during the late nineteenth and early twentieth centuries. Some sources give his first name as William instead of Owen, however, all sources agree on the prominent use of Graystone. The cause of confusion about the correct form of Bird's full name is unclear, but it does not seem to be a case of multiple photographers using the names "Graystone" and "Bird" in combination, contemporaneously.

Born in Frome, Somerset, he was a member of the second-generation of a prominent family of pioneering photographers who relocated to the town of Bath, in England during the mid 1860s. His father, Frederic Charles Bird, a photographer and portrait painter active from the middle to late nineteenth century, had received a Royal Warrant of Appointment from the contemporary Prince of Wales, the future king Edward VII. The younger Bird would also receive this honour, although the limited records available are unclear about whether his patron, as Prince of Wales, was Edward VII or George V, or both.

Bird was a skilled and respected artist, the winner of numerous photography prizes, whose talent was internationally recognised during his professional lifetime. Posthumously however, he slipped into relative obscurity, when compared to other notable photographers of the period.

Aside from the simple passage of time, and the role of random-chance selection in the recognition of artistic talent, there appear to be two key reasons why Bird's work remains relatively unknown:

- much of Bird's most notable work, created during a peak period of his career in the 1890s and very early 1900s, involved creating pictorialist-style photographic images for publication-and-use as magic lantern slides. This was, at the time, a popular form of entertainment in private homes and public shows. However, the development of moving pictures as a form of art and entertainment, beginning in the 1890s, would eclipse the popularity of magic-lantern shows in the early decades of the twentieth century. Also, the format of images recorded on large-sized glass slides, for use with magic-lantern-type projectors was superseded by "film slides" (i.e., image-transparencies recorded on small pieces of thin, flexible film; made either from a form of cellulose, or from more advanced sheet-plastic materials), and more modern types of still-image projectors.
- the building, at 38, Milsom Street, Bath, which had housed the Bird family's studio-workshop for 73 years, and also contained the archives of their photographic work, was apparently destroyed in some catastrophic event in 1937 (details not specified in the available sources); Bird was still alive at the time, age 74–75. After the unspecified ' event' at Milsom Street, Graystone set up a new studio at 9, Sydney Place, Bath. Thus, by the middle of the twentieth century, the master copies of most of Bird's photographs had been destroyed, along with the related documentation; and among his surviving works, the most notable remaining were part of an obscure genre, stored in an obsolete and relatively fragile medium.

Owen Graystone Bird died on 17 October 1943, age 80. He had at least one child, a son, Charles Frederick Graystone Bird; also a photographer. His grandson, David Graystone Bird, is active in promoting awareness of the photographic work of his ancestors.

The Keasbury-Gordon Photograph Archive, a commercial enterprise which specialises in early British photography, has a small collection of Graystone Bird photographs, and has produced a number of YouTube video documentaries about Bird and his work.

== References and external links ==
- "Graystone Bird – Person – National Portrait Gallery". Npg.org.uk.
- "Frederick C. Bird – Person – National Portrait Gallery". www.npg.org.uk.
- Photography, Early Canterbury (14 August 2010). "Bird, Frederick C.".
- "Photographers B – Photographers 1840 – 1940 Great Britain & Ireland". Archived from the original on 11 September 2013.
- Butterworth, Mark. "Encyclopedia of The Magic Lantern : The Magic Lantern Society". www.magiclantern.org.uk. Archived from the original on 14 April 2018.
- Some Graystone Bird slides of the area around Silverdale, Lancashire, held at Morecambe Library
