= John Adams (educationist) =

UK academic, educator, and science fiction author

Sir John Adams (2 July 1857 – 30 September 1934) was a Scottish education scholar who was the first Principal of UCL Institute of Education.

Adams was born in Glasgow, the third son of Charles Adams, a blacksmith. He was educated at St David's School and Old Wynd School before entering the Glasgow Free Church Training College and the University of Glasgow (1875), where he studied for six years. He graduated MA in Mental Philosophy in 1884 and BSc. in 1888.

He became a school teacher, rector of Campbeltown Grammar School and president of the Educational Institute of Scotland. He was also rector of the Free Church Training College, firstly in Aberdeen (1890) and then in Glasgow (1898). He was Professor of Education at University of Glasgow.

In 1902 he was appointed Principal of the new London Day Training College (LDTC) for the training of teachers. Adams was joined with a mistress and master of Method (later Vice-Principals). The bulk of the teaching was carried out by the Vice-Principals and other specialists were appointed to teach specific subjects, including Cyril Burt. Initially the LDTC only provided teacher training courses lasting between 1 and 3 years.

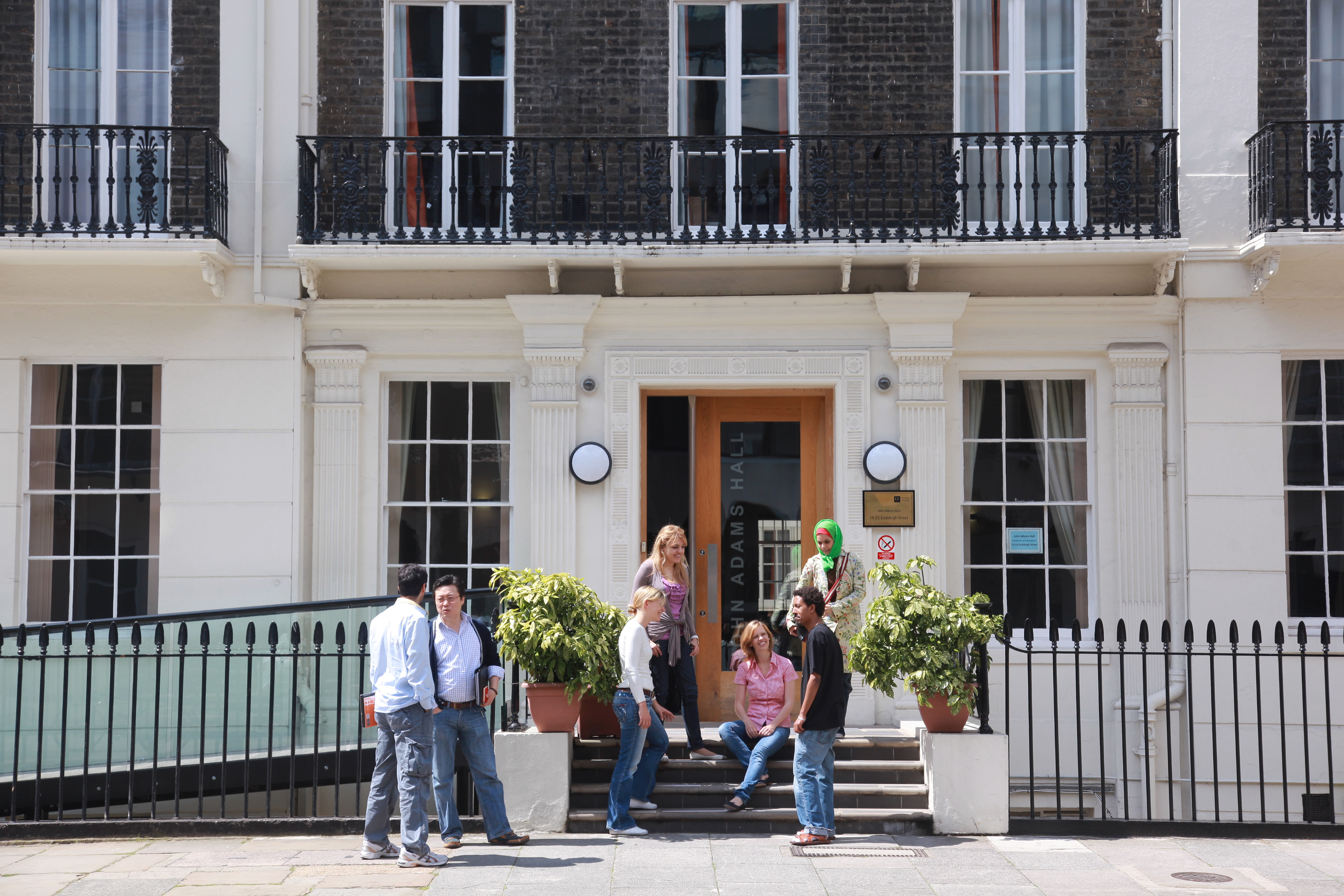
John Adams Hall, the IOE's main hall of residence, named after the first principal

In 1909 the LDTC became a school of the University of London and was renamed the University of London, Institute of Education (IOE). From 1909 to 1923 Hoyle was the first Professor of Education there, after which he moved to America, where he lectured at the University of California until his death in 1934. He was knighted in the 1925 New Year Honours for services to education.

Adams published Herbartian Psychology Applied to Education in 1898. Under the pseudonym of Skelton Kuppord, he wrote two school stories for young readers: Hammond's Hard Lines (1894) and The Rickerton Medal (1896).
