= Thomas Morison Legge =

British physician

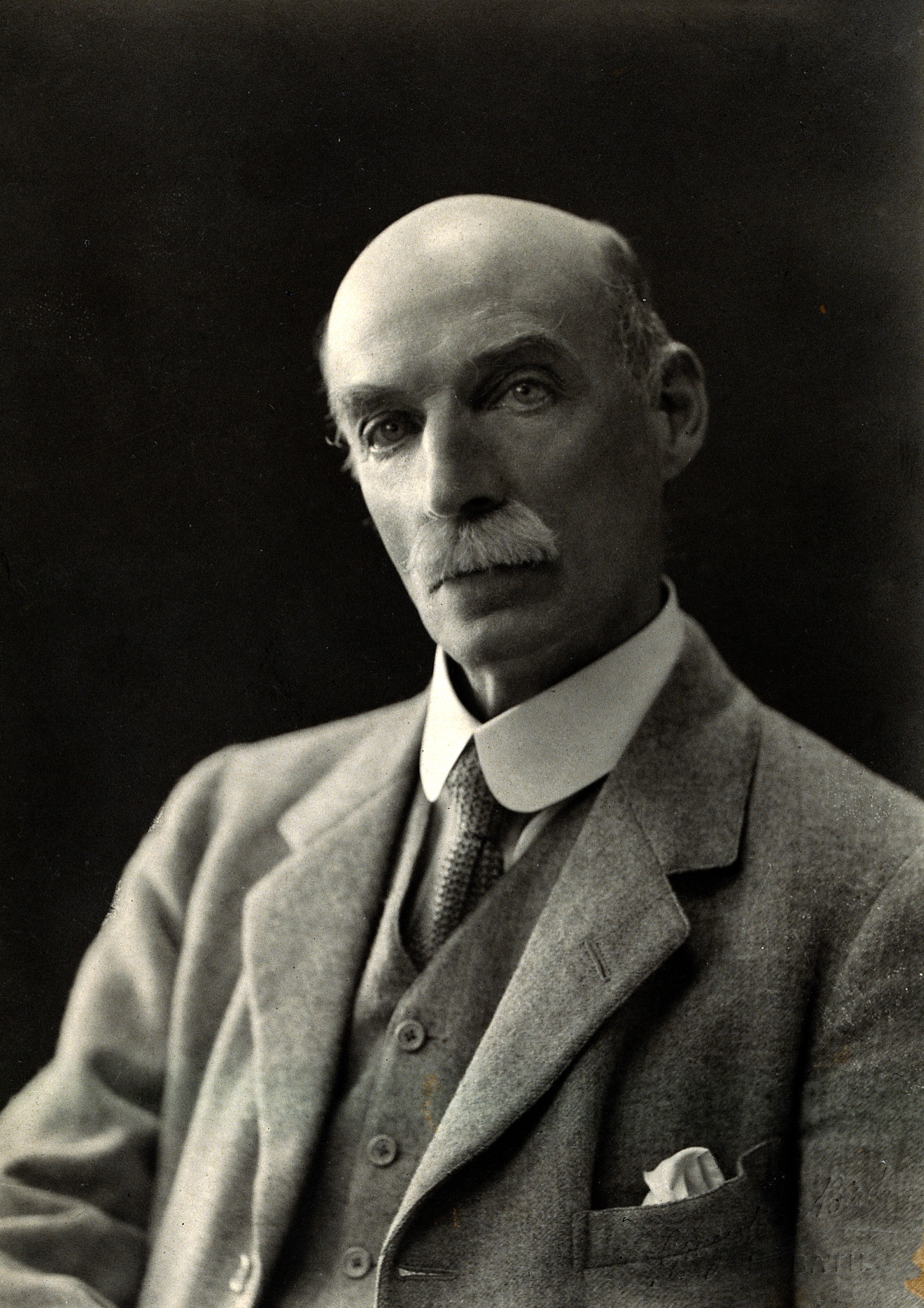
Thomas Morison Legge, photograph by Graystone Bird

Sir Thomas Morison Legge CBE (6 January 1863 – 7 May 1932) was a British physician who served as medical inspector to improve industrial hygiene.

== Life ==
Legge was born in Hong Kong, the son of Scottish Chinese-language scholar James Legge and his second wife, Hannah Mary Johnstone. He was educated at Magdalen College School.

Legge matriculated at the University of Oxford in 1882 as a non-college student. He graduated B.A. at Trinity College, Oxford in 1886. He became a medical student at St Bartholomew's Hospital in London, and graduated M.B. and B.Ch. in 1890, D.Ph. at Cambridge in 1893, and M.D. at Oxford in 1894.

Appointed in 1898, Legge was the first Medical Inspector of Factories and Workshops in the United Kingdom. He resigned the post on 29 November 1926.

== Awards and honours ==
Legge was appointed Commander of the Order of the British Empire (CBE) in 1918 and knighted in the 1925 New Year Honours. He was awarded the Bisset Hawkins Medal of the Royal College of Physicians in 1923.

== Work ==
Legge's work was especially concerned with anthrax and lead poisoning.

Legge's axioms, which he expounded in 1929, are "famous". They include the following:

1. Unless and until the employer has done everything — and everything means a good deal — the workman can do next to nothing to protect himself although he is naturally willing enough to do his share.
2. If you can bring an influence to bear external to the workman (i.e. one over which he can exercise no control), you will be successful; and if you can't or don't, you won't.
3. Practically all industrial lead poisoning is due to the inhalation of dust and fumes; and if you stop their inhalation you will stop the poisoning.
4. All workmen should be told something of the danger of the materials they come into contact with and not be left to find it out for themselves — sometimes at the cost of their lives.
