= Hammond's Hard Lines =

1894 children's novel by Skelton Kuppord

- Author: Skelton Kuppord
- Illustrator: Harold Copping
- Language: English
- Genre: Children's fiction
- Publisher: Blackie & Son
- Publication date: November 1894
- Publication place: United Kingdom
- Pages: 223
- OCLC: 30105470
- Text: Hammond's Hard Lines at Archive.org

Hammond's Hard Lines is a children's novel written by Scottish educationist John Adams (under the pen name of Skelton Kuppord), with illustrations by Harold Copping. In the tale—one of only two school stories by Kuppord—a British schoolboy gets wishes from a mysterious figure that do not go well in his or the institution's favour. It was published to positive reviews by Blackie & Son, first in 1894 and again with updated text in 1957.

== Plot ==
"The moral of [this] amusing story is that[,] were boys to have all of their wishes fulfilled[,] things would go very badly with them."

— The Standard, 7 December 1894

British public-school pupil Tom Hammond, "much given to grumbling and discontent", wishes for many things. One day, after his Headmaster confines him to a punishment cell, a mysterious figure (Note: A fairy named Peas-blossom in Kuppord's original text, or a gremlin named "C for Charlie" in the 1957 update.) offers him three of them, which he happily accepts. Angry with Tom's first wish—to have as many wishes as he likes—the figure decides to limit them to six per week, committed in order. Tom wishes himself out of confinement, but is flogged after he tries to escape, and gets into trouble when confessing that the figure helped him along.

Tom experiences mishaps with every further wish he makes: An escape to the woods sees him barefoot and bruised there during midnight; expunging Virgil from existence sends his school scrambling to find the Roman poet's works in their premises; and during a trip aboard a ship, he ends up as a stowaway. These incidents, along with blaming the figure for his misfortunes, are enough to get him sent to the madhouse. Soon after, he is suspected of murdering the madhouse's doctor after he wishes his master were at Jericho. Suddenly, he lands back in his school cell, happy to realise that he was only dreaming all along.

== Background ==
According to The Encyclopaedia of School Stories, Hammond's Hard Lines was "the much better known" of Kuppord's two school stories. (Note: The other one was The Rickerton Medal, originally published in 1896 as A Board School Story under John Adams' real name. The book was reissued in 1902 as a Kuppord work with the new subtitle Tram Street, Standard VI.) "A minor classic," the book was "one of the very few [contemporary British publications in its genre] to rely on fantasy for its plot." Harold Copping provided the illustrations for the original edition.

== Release ==
Hammond's was published in November 1894 as part of Blackie & Son's Half-Crown Series, and was popular enough to receive a reissue in late 1901; a reprint occurred in 1942 after the author's death. In Kuppord's original text, a fairy named Peas-blossom granted Tom his wishes; (Note: This article uses the book's original spelling of her name; The Liverpool Mercury rendered it as "Peas Blossom".) an updated version in 1957 (part of the publisher's Life and Adventure Series) renamed the protagonist as Tim, and replaced the fairy with a gremlin named "C for Charlie".

== Reception ==
The book was positively received across its two editions. Upon its original publication, an uncredited writer for The Sunday School of London predicted of Hammond's Hard Lines, "I have little doubt the small children will enjoy this book beyond all the others on the list this week [of 22 November 1894]. It is so unusually delightful a fairy book." The Standard called it "very clever, and provocative of laughter." As The Bookseller remarked in its Christmas edition, Kuppord's work was:

a very diverting amalgam of a fairy tale and an ordinary story of schoolboy life, which little boys at school will find both interesting and instructive. They will at least learn from it that it is not always for our advantage to have our wishes granted, or, at any rate, that misfortune may befall us if we do not restrain our desires within reasonable limits.

At the start of 1895, The Queenslander of Australia concurred with The Standard, adding that the accounts of Hammond's later exploits made the story "exciting". A retrospective 1924 review in the Liverpool Post and Mercury stated that Kuppord "essays the fantastic" with his tale. "There is a hint of 'vice versa' about the amusing muddle in which the hero...lands himself ere the final solution. But there are some who will think this dangerously experimental ground for boys' fiction."

Reviewing the 1957 version, the Australian educational journal The Slow Learning Child wrote, "With [Tim Hammond], our older backward readers will have no trouble at all in identifying themselves[;] the situation in which Tim finds himself [is] amusing". A similar British publication, The Woman Teacher, observed that "the story flows smoothly and is interesting" despite having been simplified. Both outlets took note of the "rapid" action and suspense in the plot.
