= Cyprus Military Police =

Cyprus Military Police Κυπριακή Στρατιωτική Αστυνομία Kıbrıs Jandarması

Agency overview
- Formed: 1878
- Dissolved: 1935

Jurisdictional structure
- Operations jurisdiction: Cyprus
- General nature: Gendarmerie

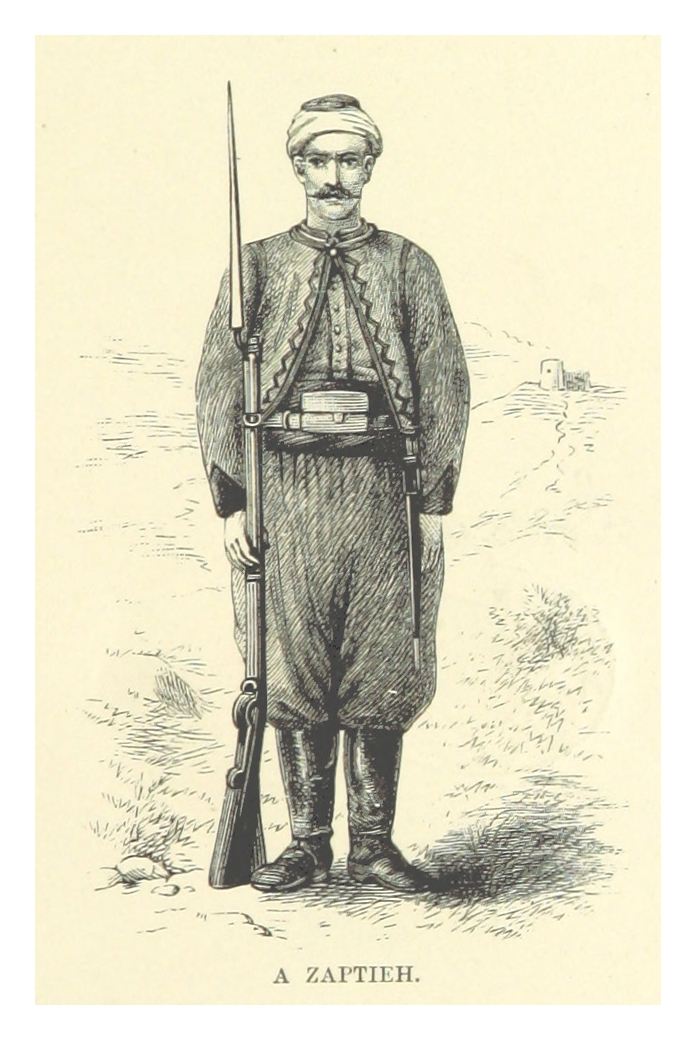
A military policeman in 1887.

The Cyprus Military Police (CMP) was a gendarmerie force created during the British administration of Cyprus.

== History ==
In 1878, the British colonial administration of Cyprus raised a Gendarmerie force, the Cyprus Military Police (CMP), replacing the Ottoman local police force of Zaptiehs. The popular designation for members of the new force continued to be "zaptieh".

The Zaptiehs' original duties had been almost entirely confined to tax collection under the Ottomans. Under British administration, the role of the CMP was expanded to include guard, escort and prison duties, as well as tackling the high crime rate. In 1879 a new corps called the Cyprus Pioneers was raised to undertake works of public utility. The Cyprus Pioneers played an invaluable part in assisting recover from the disastrous Limassol floods of 1880. Shortly after this, it was decided to integrate the military police and pioneers into a single force consisting of an establishment of 8 British officers, 9 Cypriot officers, 220 mounted and 473 foot rank and file, governed by a chief commandant and six local commandants responsible for the six administrative districts of Cyprus.

By the late 1890s the Cyprus Military Police had become a well-trained force drawn from both the Turkish and Greek Cypriot communities, under the control of a single island-wide command. CMP personnel were housed in barracks under military discipline, with the eight most senior officer positions being filled by secondment from the British Army. The force's personnel were initially predominantly drawn from the minority Turkish Cypriot population, although by 1897, the force claimed to have recruited almost equal number of Greek Cypriots, in line with British martial race theory. Mounted zaptiehs, armed with carbines and sabres, were portrayed in contemporary illustrations patrolling rural roads in twos, providing a visible safeguard against property crime in rural areas.

A detachment of mounted zaptiehs participated in Queen Victoria's Diamond Jubilee celebrations of 1897, where their fezzes and blue and scarlet zouave-style jackets attracted much attention. By 1907 the zouave uniforms had been replaced by khaki drill for ordinary duties, although the fezzes were retained.

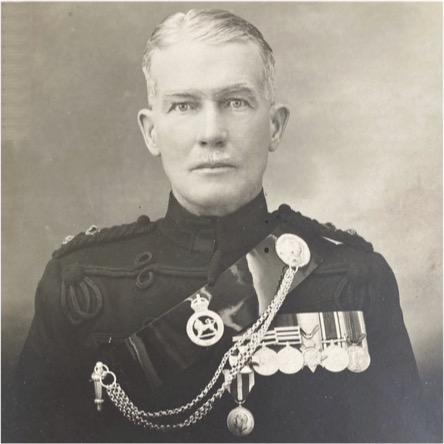
British officer commanding the Cyprus Military Police, circa 1928

Cyprus was annexed by Britain during World War I, when Turkey entered the war on the side of the Central Powers, and was declared a British crown colony in 1925. The CMP focused attention on counter-espionage activities during the war, patrolling the extensive coastline. The police force had retained its quasi military governance under the command of Lt-Col. A.E. Gallagher from 1915 until his retirement in 1933. Two years later, the police force was reorganised as a civilian "Cyprus Police Force", replacing seconded Army officers with inspectors and commissioners appointed from British and other colonial police forces.

== See also ==
- Cretan Gendarmerie
- Cypriot National Guard
- Cyprus Police
- Hellenic Gendarmerie
- Zaptié (Italian colonial gendarmerie)
