= Harold Copping =

British artist

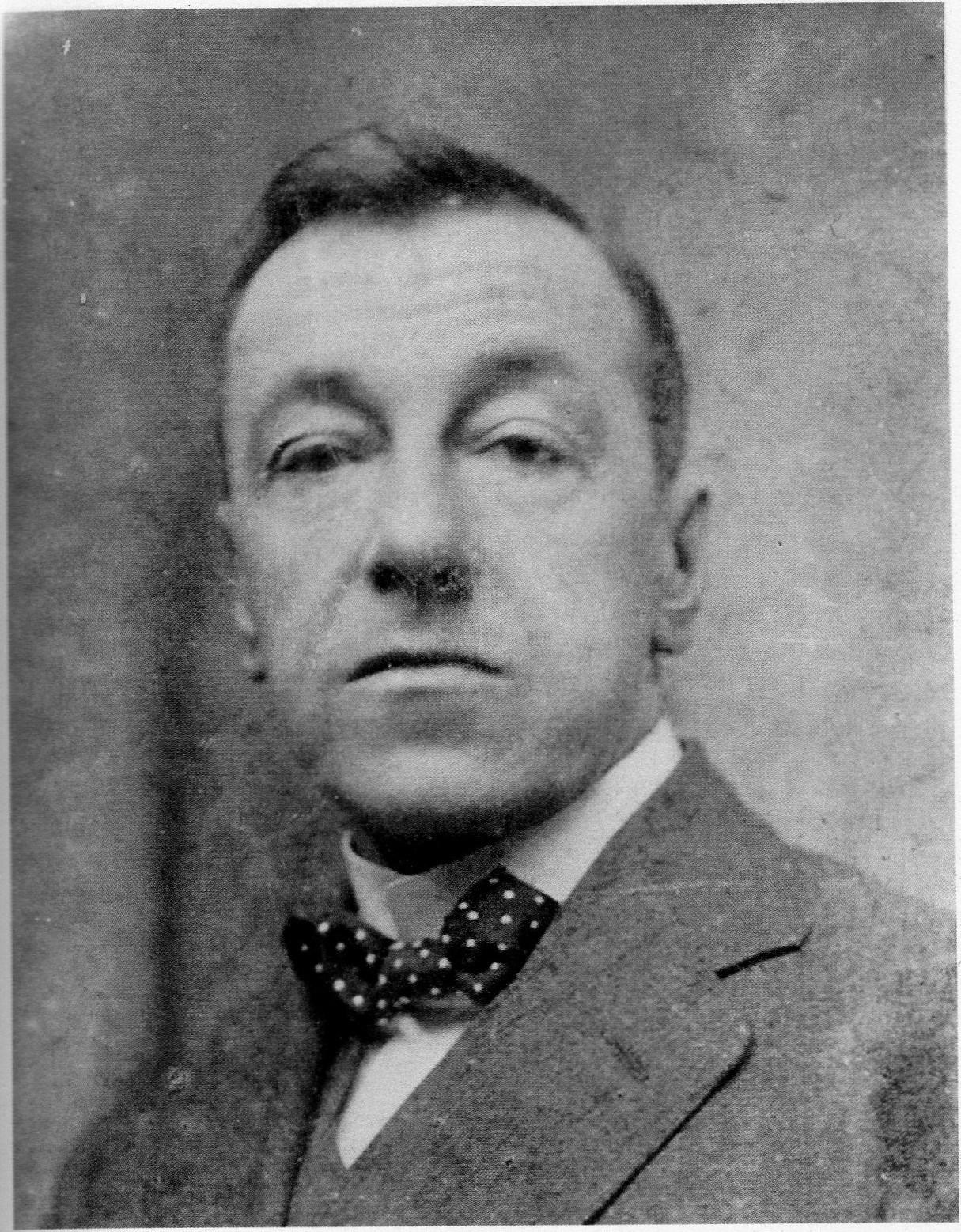
Harold Copping in 1913

Harold Copping (25 August 1863 – 1 July 1932) was a British artist best known as an illustrator of biblical scenes. His 1910 book The Copping Bible illustrated by himself became a best-seller.

== Biography ==
Born in Camden Town in 1863, he was the second son of journalist Edward Copping (1829–1904) and Rose Heathilla (née Prout) (1832–1877), the daughter of John Skinner Prout, the water-colour artist. His brother, Arthur E. Copping, became a noted author, journalist and traveller and was a member of the Salvation Army.

Harold Copping entered London's Royal Academy where he won a Landseer Scholarship to study in Paris. He quickly became established as a successful painter and illustrator, living in Croydon and Hornsey during the early years of his career. Copping had links with the missionary societies of his time including the London Missionary Society (LMS), who commissioned him as an illustrator of biblical scenes. To achieve authenticity and realism for his illustrations he travelled to Palestine and Egypt. The resulting book, The Copping Bible (1910), became a best-seller and led to more Bible commissions. These included A Journalist in the Holy Land (1911), The Golden Land (1911), The Bible Story Book (1923) and My Bible Book (1931). Copping used family, friends and neighbours as models in his paintings, keeping a stock of costumes and props at his home. In many of his Bible paintings one of his wife's striped tea towels can be seen worn on the heads of various Bible characters. Copping's beautifully executed watercolour illustrations were put onto lantern slides and were used by Christian missionaries all over the world. His pictures were also widely reproduced by missionary societies as posters, tracts and as magazine illustrations.

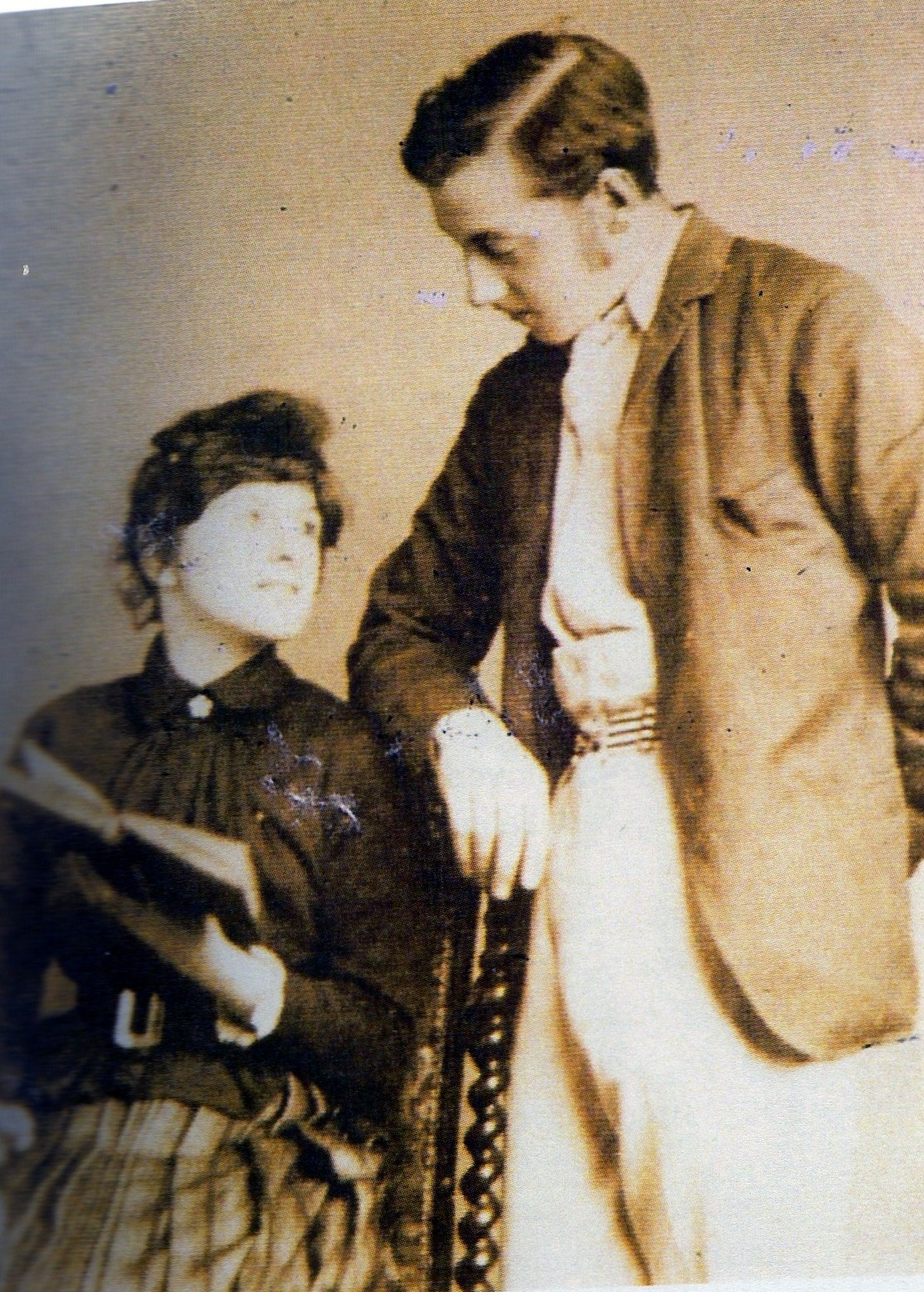
Copping and Violet Amy Prout at the time of their engagement (c.1887)

Probably the most famous of Copping's Bible illustrations was 'The Hope of the World' (1915). This depicts Jesus sitting with a group of children from different continents. Dr. Sandy Brewer wrote of this image: "The Hope of the World, painted by Harold Copping for the London Missionary Society in 1915, is arguably the most popular picture of Jesus produced in Britain in the twentieth century. It was an iconic image in the Sunday school movement between 1915 and 1960". However, James Thorpe, in his book English Illustration: the Nineties wrote: "Harold Copping’s work, capable and honest as it was, does not inspire any great enthusiasm; there are so many artists doing illustrations equally satisfactory in literal translation and equally lacking in strong personal individuality." Copping was under contract to the Religious Tract Society (RTS) to produce 12 religious paintings a year up until the time of his death. He was paid £50 for each painting and, under the terms of the contract, was not allowed to paint religious paintings for any other publisher.

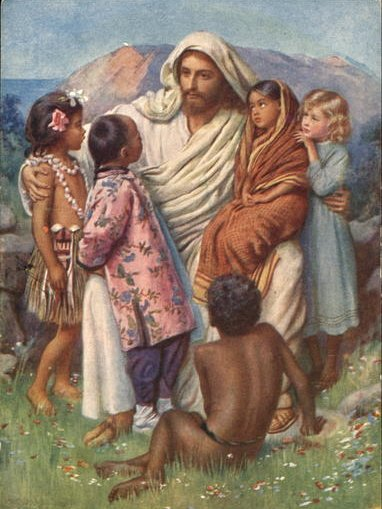
Copping's 'The Hope of the World' (1915)

His illustrations for non-religious books included Hammond's Hard Lines (1894), Miss Bobbie (1897), Millionaire (1898), A Queen Among Girls (1900), The Pilgrim's Progress (1903), Westward Ho! (1903), Grace Abounding (1905), Three School Chums (1907), Little Women (1912), Good Wives (1913), A Christmas Carol (1920) and Character Sketches from Boz (1924). He also illustrated the children's books by Mary Angela Dickens based on the novels of her grandfather, Charles Dickens. These included Children's Stories from Dickens (1911) and Dickens' Dream Children (1926).

He also illustrated a number of stories set in fictional British public schools, including Boys of the Priory School (1900) and The Boys of Wynport School (1916).

Copping's illustrations were also published in such periodicals as The Leisure Hour, Little Folks, Pearson's Magazine, The Royal Magazine, The Temple Magazine and The Windsor Magazine. A trip to Canada inspired the collection of watercolour sketches Canadian Pictures.

Copping married Violet Amy Prout (1865–1894) in 1888, and their children were Ernest Noel Copping (1889–1978), Romney Copping (1891–1910) and Violet Copping (1891–1892). Following his wife's death aged only 29, Copping married Edith Louise Mothersill (born 1876) in 1897 and had children Joyce Copping (1901–1934) and John Clarence Copping (1914–1977).

He lived for many years at 'The Studio' in Shoreham in Kent, and here he died on 1 July 1932 aged 68. He was buried in the churchyard of St Peter and St Paul in Shoreham.

== Gallery ==
=== Biblical scenes ===
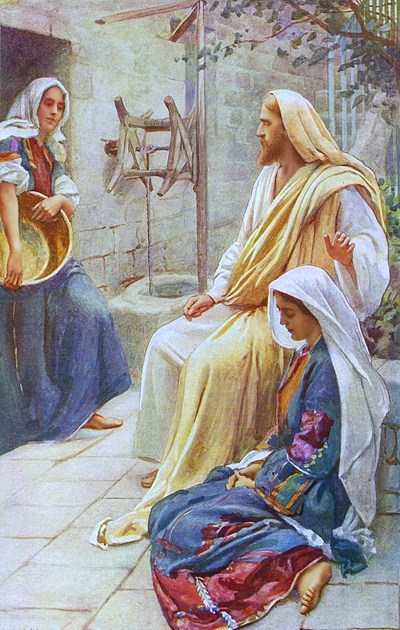
Jesus at the home of Martha and Mary

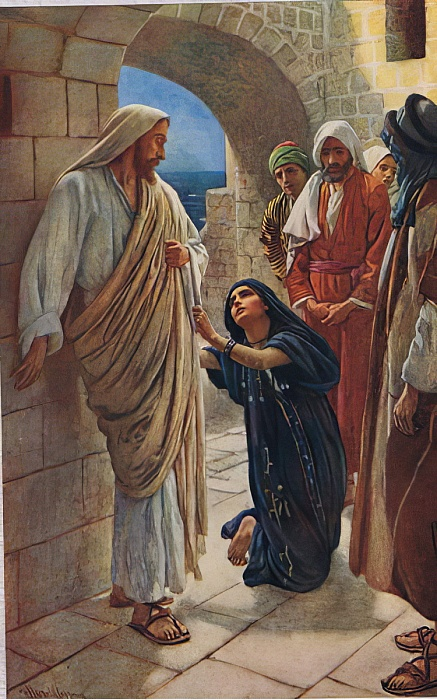
The Woman of Canaan

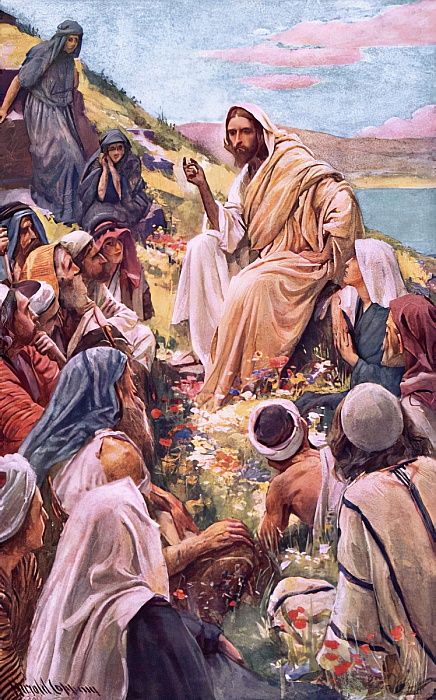
The Sermon on the Mount

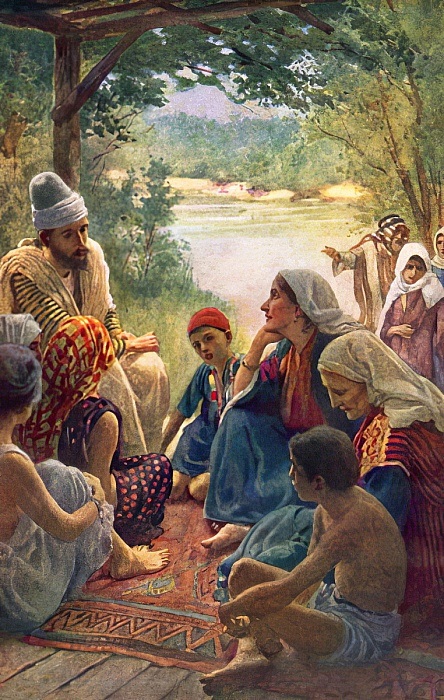
Lydia of Thyatira

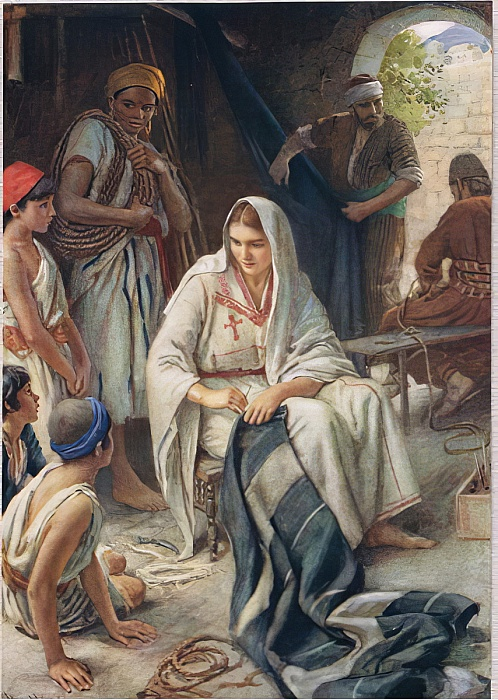
Priscilla

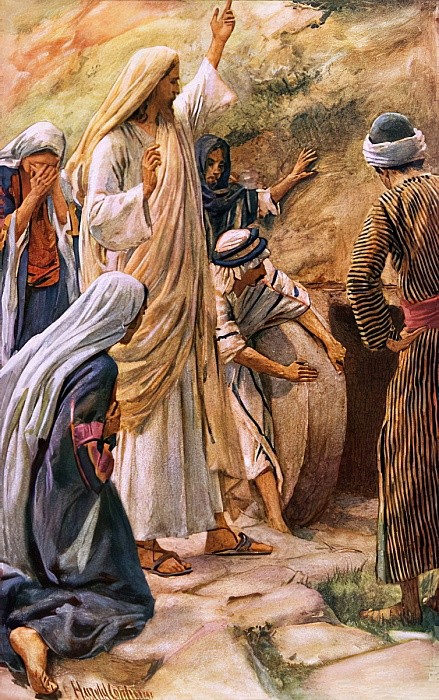
Lazarus come forth

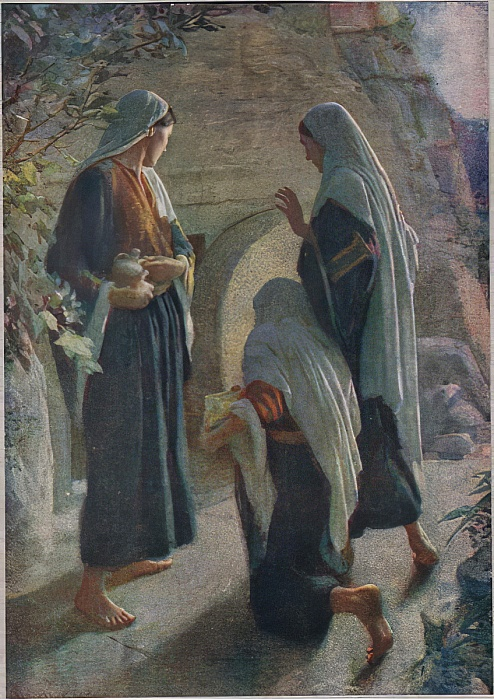
Woman at the Sepulchre

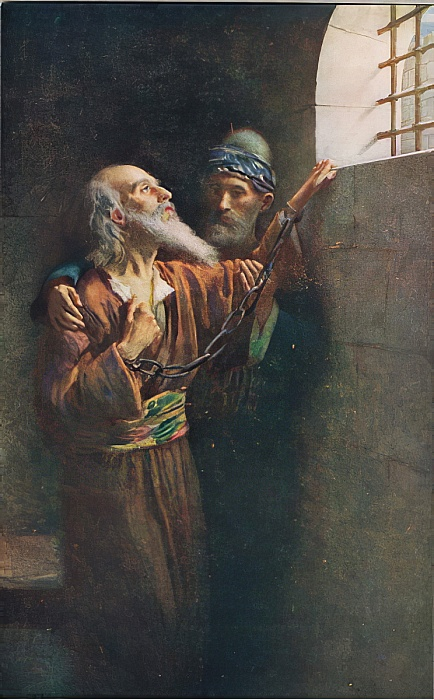
I have fought a good fight

=== Non-religious illustrations ===
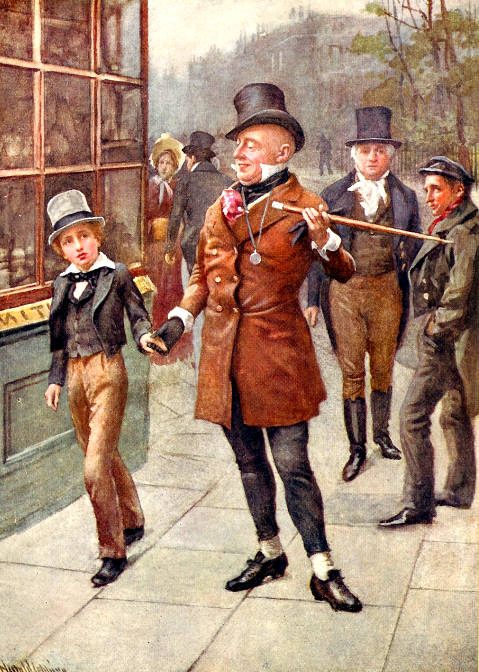
Mr Micawber and David Copperfield

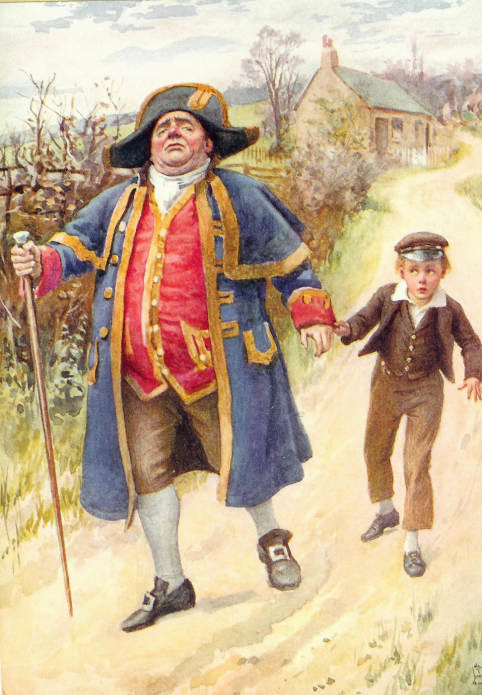
Mr Bumble and Oliver Twist

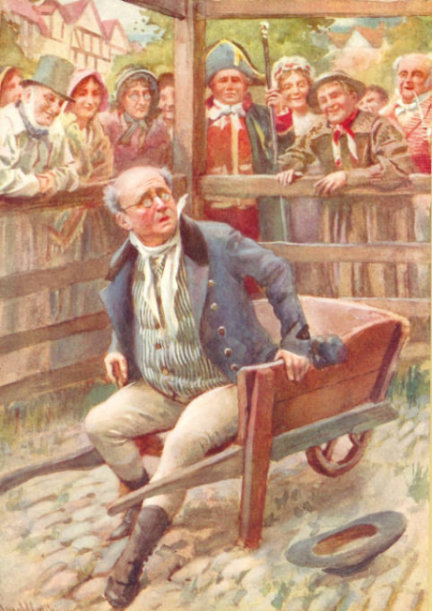
Mr. Pickwick from The Pickwick Papers

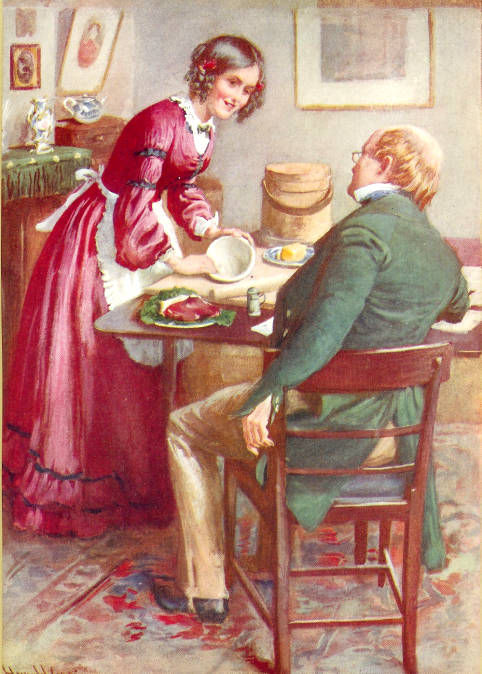
Ruth Pinch making a pudding for her brother
