= Albert Ernest Gallagher =

British infantry and colonial military police officer (1872–1940)

Albert Ernest Gallagher CBE, DSO
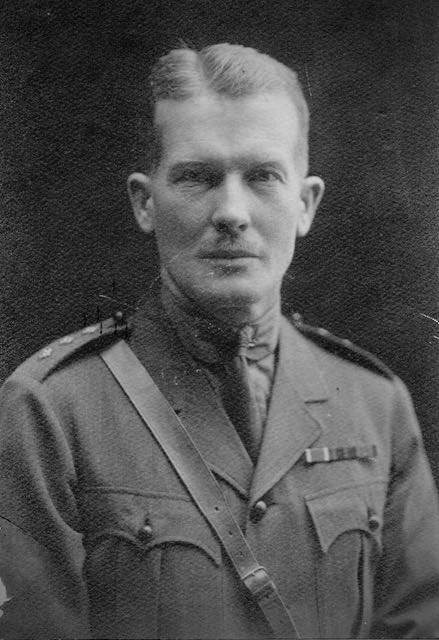
- Gallagher in the uniform of the Royal Munster Fusiliers, circa 1915
- Born: 2 February 1872; Hyderabad, Hyderabad State (now India)
- Died: 24 September 1940 (aged 68); Nicosia, British Colony of Cyprus
- Military career
- Allegiance: United Kingdom
- Branch: British Army; British Military Police
- Service years: 1900–1935
- Rank: Lieutenant Colonel
- Nickname: "Mickey"
- Units: The King's Royal Rifle Corps; Royal Munster Fusiliers; Cyprus Military Police
- Awards: CBE, DSO

Lieutenant Colonel Albert Ernest Gallagher, CBE, DSO (2 February 1872 – 24 September 1940) was a British Infantry and colonial military police officer of Irish descent, who fought in three wars and who became part of the ruling council of colonial Cyprus.

== Military career ==
Albert Ernest Gallagher was born in Hyderabad, Hyderabad State (now India) on 2 February 1872, the second son of Captain Dr. John Gallagher, a British Army surgeon, and Mary née Mahone. He first appears as a second lieutenant serving with the 9th Battalion of The King's Royal Rifle Corps in the Boer War in 1900, initially in South Orange River in July, the Transvaal in November before returning to the Orange River and the Cape Colonies in December of the same year. (Note: Gallagher was awarded the Queen's medal with 2 clasps for his service in the Boer War, photograph inserted) Gallagher was promoted to lieutenant and shortly after, was seconded to the West African Frontier Force (WAFF) to serve in Argungu in Northern Nigeria, where he was repeatedly mentioned in dispatches for his gallantry. He remained active in Northern Nigeria joining the Sokoto Expedition in 1903, and promoted to captain in the King's Royal Rifle Corps in 1904 after the fall of the Kano Emirate, whilst remaining seconded to WAFF. (Note: See Nigeria medals photograph inserted, with 3 clasps 1902-1906)

=== Distinguished Service Order ===
Officers ranked major (or equivalent) or higher are typically appointed Companion of the Distinguished Service Order if they demonstrate a high degree of gallantry, just short of deserving the Victoria Cross. In January 1906, Captain Gallagher was appointed to command "F" company of the 1st Battalion of the Northern Nigeria Regiment garrisoned at Zungeru. In less than a month, he had "got the confidence of his men so completely that they would follow him anywhere". Orders were issued on 16 February and by the next morning, "F" company had crossed the Kaduna and set off on a fast march to Kontagora averaging 25 miles per day, arriving there on 20 February ahead of the brigade commander and ready to leave for Sokoto the following morning. It was by Gallagher's "cheerfulness and untiring energy that the column was able to cover the ground as quickly as it did" at a time when the Harmattan was blowing with exceptional "thickness". The same pace was achieved over the next 8 1/2 days, with the combined forces arriving in Sokoto on 1 March, a distance of 214 miles (ibid.).

The opposing force of about five thousand poorly armed, but reportedly, fanatical supporters of a self-declared Mahdi had raised the standard of revolt at a town called Satiru 14 miles south of Sokoto. "F" company led the attack on 10 March, with Gallagher commanding the front face of a square with the intention of drawing the much larger enemy force in to the open. The enemy reportedly fought with great bravery, repeatedly charging the square (ibid.). At some point, Gallagher's company broke from the square, leading a bayonet charge into the southern part of the town, where he was wounded by an arrow that lodged in his elbow joint. He continued to lead his men into the town, who went at the enemy "with a dash, which I have not seen equalled in this country". "F" company "had fought splendidly", rallying around their injured captain to protect him. The arrow was suspected of being poisoned, leaving Gallagher severely wounded. He was created a companion of the Distinguished Service Order in 1907.

Gallagher transferred to The Royal Munster Fusiliers, but continued serving in Nigeria until 1908, when he suspended his combat career by entering the political department of the Northern Nigeria Protectorate under Sir Frederick Lugard.

== Cyprus Military Police ==
In 1909, Gallagher relocated to British Cyprus, where he was appointed local commandant of the Limassol Cyprus Military Police (CMP), one of the four local commands on the island at the time. Cyprus was a British protectorate consisting of mixed ethnic communities dominated by Greek Cypriots (up to 78%) emerging from rapidly waning Ottoman suzerainty. From 1909 to 1914, the CMP held together the outward appearance of the Anglo-Ottoman administration in Cyprus, with around 700 Zaptiehs organised in both mounted and foot units initially dominated by the Turkish Cypriot minority. The new British High Commissioner to Cyprus, Hamilton Goold-Adams, agitated the Greek Cypriot majority further by clamping down on expressions of Greek nationalism, uniting radical nationists and moderates behind Enosis. The resulting rise of Greek Cypriot nationalism erupted in 1912 in Gallagher's own district of Limassol after a Muslim stabbed two Greek Cypriots and another Muslim was killed in a brawl. Troops were mobilised killing two Greek Cypriots and injuring 150 others. The use of increased military force rapidly quelled the unrest but Goold-Adams continued to frustrate Greek Cypriot nationalism as well as Greek Cypriot identity in the legislature. In June 1914, Gallagher was appointed acting chief commandant of the CMP and inspector of prisons. Three years of mounting resentment against Goold-Adams changed in November when the Ottomans joined the Central Powers at the outbreak of World War One, resulting in the complete annexation of Cyprus into the British Empire. Cyprus was placed under military administration and the source of resentment, Goold-Adams, was removed as high commissioner. The following year, Gallagher was appointed (permanent) chief commandant of Police and Inspector of prisons, an office he held until his retirement in 1933.

On 18 June 1915, Gallagher received a letter from his brother, who was serving at the front in France. A week later, his brother was dead; within ten weeks, Gallagher was granted leave of absence to rejoin his regiment, returning to active service to participate in the first World War aged 43. Gallagher had retained the rank of captain in the newly established Special Reserves, initially attached to the 4th Battalion of the Royal Munster Fusiliers.

== First World War (Note: see Medals photograph inserted featuring 1914 Star, British War Medal (1915) and victory medal) ==
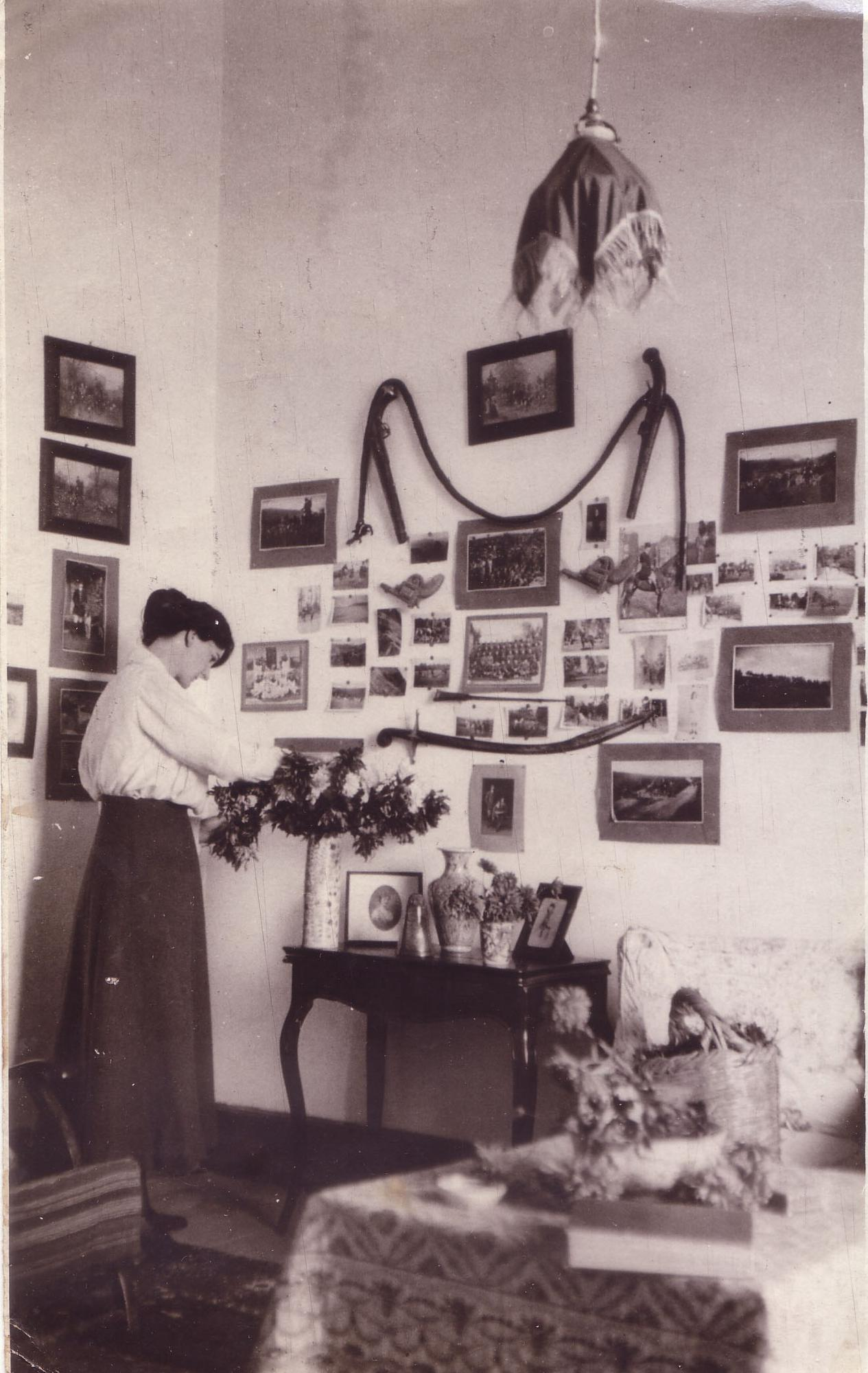
Marjorie Gallagher tending a memorial wall to her husband - throughout the period (late 1915 to 1918) Marjorie Gallagher and her two children lived in the relative safety of the "Palace Hotel, Nicosia".

Gallagher was transferred to the 10th Division of the Fusiliers in 1915, which had been severely depleted at Gallipoli. He was appointed second in command of the 7th Battalion of the Royal Munster Fusiliers (7RMF) and assigned to the Macedonian front in October shortly after Bulgaria had invaded Serbia. The 7RMF had taken over the frontline positions at the Battle of Kosturino on 29 November. A Canadian soldier attached to the 7RMF reported that after three days of bombardment from German artillery, they were forced to retreat "at a dead run" from the advancing Bulgarian charge.

"To tell the truth I can't imagine how we ever got back with as many men as we did, but suppose it was on account of good order in retiring. That shows the good work of our officers, and I will speak of one, namely Captain Gallagher, as the best man I have seen in a tight place. He is second in command of this battalion or regiment, is a splendid man, and every inch a soldier. He had a lot to do with getting our men back." (Note: Private Frank McManiman was killed on the 17th March 1917 at Yenikoi)

Having failed to prevent the Bulgarians from overrunning Serbia, the 7RMF remained in Salonika, where in January 1916, Gallagher was promoted to (temporary) Major. The 7RMF retreated and withdrew to Salonika, where they spent the coming weeks restoring themselves to combat strength. By June, Gallagher travelled to Alexandria to be passed medically fit for transfer to the Worcestershire Regiment and was returned immediately back to Salonika. He joined the 11th Battalion of the Worcestershire Regiment and was promoted to major as second in command for an offensive on the Serbo-Greek frontier along a mountainous stretch north and northeast of Salonika, culminating in the Battle of Horseshoe Hill. By 24 May 1917, Gallagher had transferred to the western front in France, (Note: previously attached to the 14 Battalion of the Worcestershires) where he served for the rest of the war. He wrote a letter to his wife's sister in 1917 just before going to the front, which shows the same drive and enthusiasm reported about him in Nigeria.

"My dearest Dollie - Just a hurried line dear old girl to say I'm going into the thick of it. I've been given second-in-command of the Royal Fusiliers, address me here until you hear from me and I can give you my proper address. Just a modest soldier's request. If anything happens to me, which I feel sure will not, tell my dear old Marjorie that my life was devoted to her and she was the one and only woman I ever cared a damn about. Tell her not to grieve for me, but just to marry again a man, who will be good and kind to her & make her a good "hubby". I'll write you again as soon as I can. I feel very cheerful & so hopeful & I have the glint of war & glory in my eyes. Some people won't understand why a man with a nice loving wife and two bonny bairns runs risks, but you might explain to them that this show demands everything of a man, otherwise we should be slaves indeed. You see, I've been brought up to think in this way, so those like me will not find it difficult to understand..." (Note: He signs his letters from "Mickey")

The published record catches brief glimpses of Gallagher during the Hundred Days Offensive. He is recorded as a major second in command of the 7th Battalion of Royal Fusiliers on 21 December 1917, and was promoted to Lt. Colonel as commanding officer of the 2nd Battalion of the Royal Inniskilling Fusiliers in September 1918, "the oldest regular CO on 29 September 1918". Gallagher had survived 16 months on the western front from June 1917 until October 1918 when he was wounded a month before Armistice with Germany.

== Administrative career ==
Gallagher returned to Cyprus shortly after Armistice Day but remained on extended (sick) leave until August 1919. Cyprus under British protection was insulated from the atrocities committed by both sides in the ensuing Greco-Turkish War. The Greek authorities repeatedly attempted to recruit soldiers from the majority Greek Cypriot population, spreading sectarian sentiment throughout the island under a banner of Enosis. Gallagher sought to block the recruitment, which set him against increasing pro-enosis agitation in Cyprus, making the CMP a target for unrest (ibid p122). (Note: Traditional historiography claims that Greek Cypriots flocked to Greek Army but closer scrutiny shows this to be false. Many more Greek Cypriots joined the British Army to prevent being drafted into a sectarian war.) Gallagher's primary role as chief of police was to keep the peace, which he achieved with a firm but "restrained" approach to policing (ibid p192). The task was made even more complicated by the growing number of post-war refugee camps housing new groups of displaced ethnic minorities (ibid pp187–192).

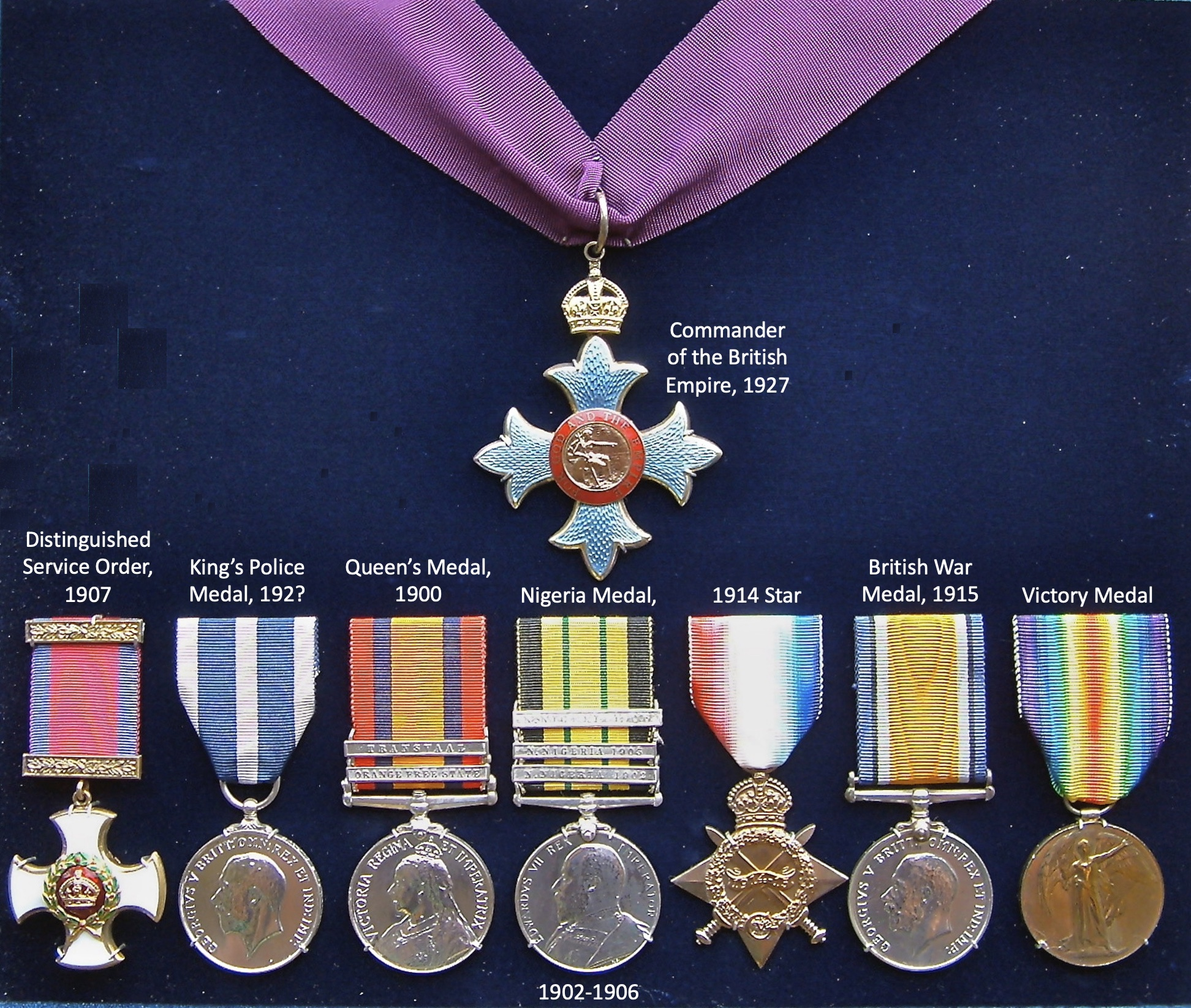
Medals awarded to A.E. Gallagher (1872-1940), compiled Adrian Lane

Post war, Gallagher had become increasingly involved as an administrator, indicated by his changing roles as a commissioner, a general registrar and as a member on both the Executive and Legislative Councils in 1922. British control of the island was consolidated in 1923 when the Turkish Republic relinquished any claims to Cyprus, which was declared a British crown colony in 1925. Gallagher was awarded the King's Police Medal in the New Year Honours list, was re-appointed to the Legislative Council of Cyprus in the same year, and was made a Commander of the Order of the British Empire in 1927. (Note: see medals photograph inserted)

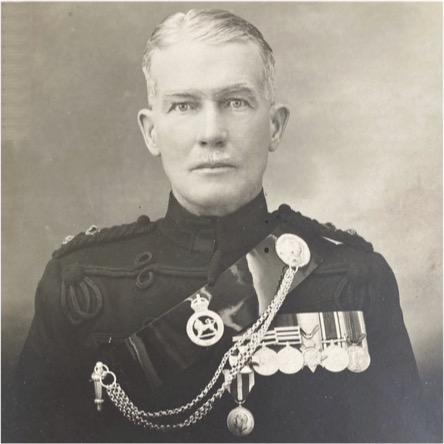
Lt. Col Albert Ernest Gallagher in the uniform of the Cyprus Military Police circa 1928

Despite his administrative roles, Gallagher remained a military policeman, a strong advocate of discipline in the police force. In 1928, Gallagher published an article to commemorate 50 years of the CMP, describing it as "an armed military body", whilst placing the emphasis on local rural constabulary, "carefully but unobtrusively watching everything which transpires in the village" in support of crime prevention. The article shows a snapshot of a visible police force set up to maintain internal security, which was increasingly seen as the unacceptable face of colonial rule, an obvious target by those continuing to call for a stronger Greek national identity (Enosis). (Note: Gallagher's mental model of effective policing was influenced by his upbringing in British Bombay policed by a quasi-military police force i.e. police on the ground were routinely armed and billeted in barracks, governed by a militaristic structure. Gallagher's parents were both born in British Ireland at the time was also policed by a similar force, the Royal Irish Constabulary) Later in the same year, the delicate balance of governance started to unravel when Greek Cypriots refused to take part in celebrations for the 50th Anniversary of colonial rule.

In 1930, Gallagher was not re-appointed to his seat, no longer capable "of acting as a member on account of illness". At the same time, the elected Turkish Cypriot members expressed the desire for autonomy from the administration, breaking the former collaboration between Turkish Cypriot and British members. Despite apparent ill health, Gallagher remained as Chief Commandant of police when riots broke out in October 1931. A curfew was declared after Government House was burnt down and Gallagher issued orders to "shoot if you have to, and when you shoot, shoot to kill". (Note: possibly prompted by the earlier unrest in Limassol in 1912) The riots subsided not long after but the British hold on Cyprus radically changed: the constitution was suspended, the Governor removed and the Legislative Council was disbanded never to reconvene, ushering in a new period of autocratic British rule, which didn't include Gallagher. He retired in 1933, with the CMP itself disbanding two years later, replaced by a civil police force.

== Private life ==
Little is known about Gallagher's early life beyond that he was raised alongside five brothers and two sisters who were all privately educated. Being born and raised in British India in the Bombay to ethnic Irish parents, brought with it a colonial outlook with a strong Irish identity. (Note: Gallagher signed his letters "Mickey" to family and friends. Colonial identities were carried with pride and determination; Mickey's Irish identity would have been important to him in his upbringing) His arrival in Cyprus in 1909 allowed him to settle into a community where he remained domiciled for the rest of his life. Two years later, he married Marjorie Olivia (née) Macaskie, who gave him a son in 1913 and a daughter in 1914. Gallagher was an enthusiastic sportsman, his favourite recreations being polo, cricket and hunting.

Gallagher's calm presence under extreme conditions attracted deep loyalty throughout his career. He died in 1940, carried to his grave by those who had served under him, with a firing party of twelve constables and two sergeants in a lavish funeral attended by the governor and the heads of almost every Government department in Cyprus.
