= Wasey Sterry =

British lawyer and colonial official (1866–1955)

Sir Wasey Sterry, Kt, CBE (26 July 1866 in Stockland, Devon – 9 August 1955 in Windsor, Berkshire) was a British lawyer and colonial official who served as Acting Governor-General of the Anglo-Egyptian Sudan between 1924 and 1925.

== Life ==
Wasey Sterry, son of the clergyman Reverend Francis Sterry and Augusta Emily Middleton, was born 26 July 1866 and baptized six days later in Stockland, Devon. He was ennobled as Knight Bachelor (Kt) in the 1925 New Year Honours, so that from then on he bore the predicate "Sir".

Sterry was a judge of the Supreme Court of Egypt (His Majesty's Supreme Court for Egypt) from 1928 to 1938, having settled in Cairo after leaving Khartoum. During this time he was awarded the Order of the Nile Second Class. After his retirement in 1938 he settled in England.

== Publications ==
- The Eton College Register, 1441–1698, 1943
- Annals Of The King's College Of Our Lady Of Eton Beside Windsor. London: Methuen, 1898. Print. Via the Internet Archive.
