= Geoffrey Rothe Clarke =

British civil servant in India

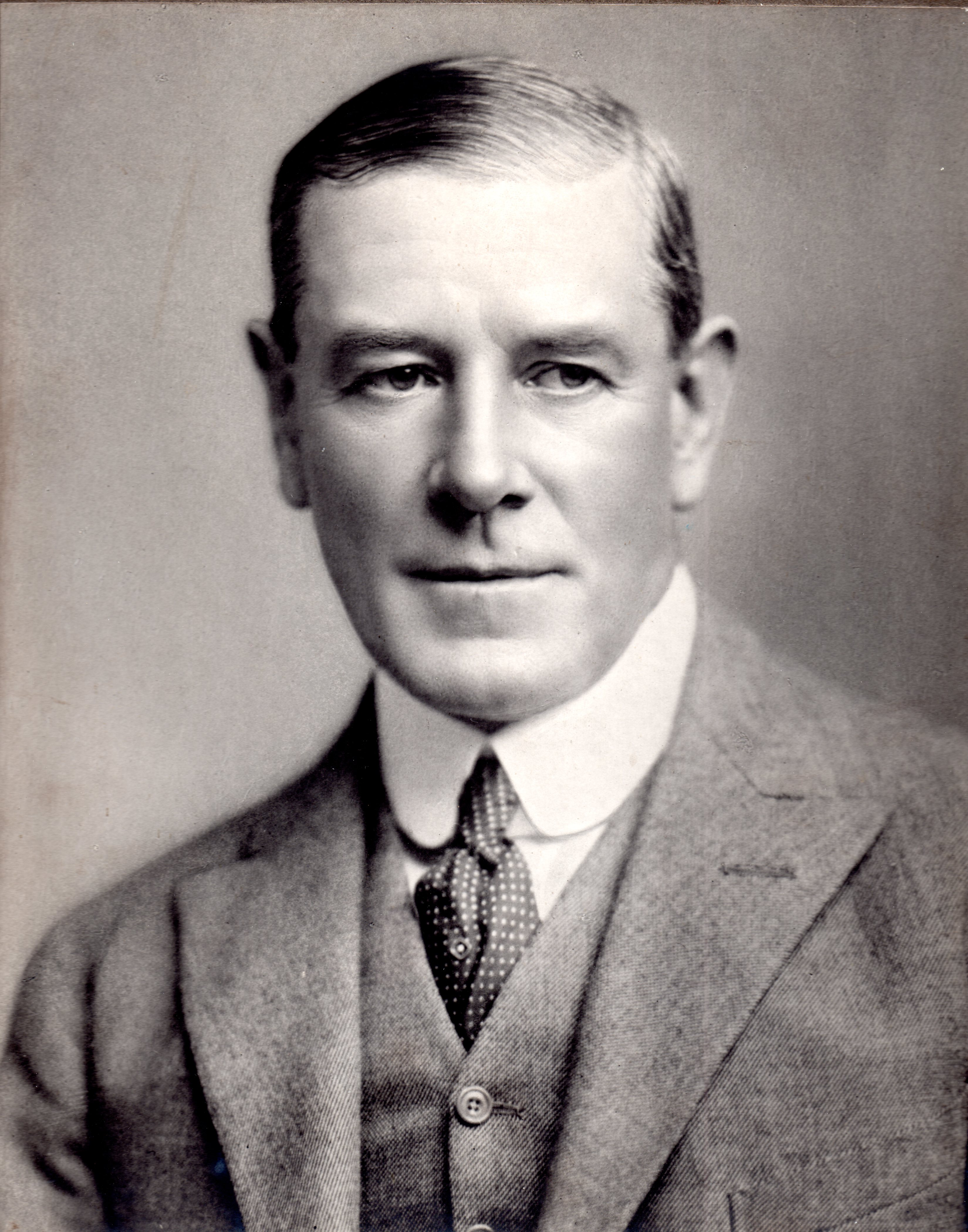
Geoffrey Rothe Clarke in 1924

Sir Geoffrey Rothe Clarke, CSI, OBE (1 July 1871 – 1 October 1950) was a senior civil servant in British India from 1903 to 1925, and thereafter a leading member of British industry until his death, including during World War II.

== Early life ==
Geoffrey Rothe Clarke was born in Midnapore, Bengal, on 1 July 1871. His father, George Richard Clarke of Waterford, Ireland, managed indigo plantations in West Bengal, while his schoolteacher mother, Margaret Elizabeth née Brunskill of Mountmellick, Ireland, a keen artist, became headmistress of the Cainesville school at Mussoorie, India.

Clarke completed his secondary education at the Corrig School, Kingstown, Ireland, that was run by an uncle. At the age of 19, Clarke entered Trinity College Dublin, commencing a four-year course in Classics and French on 10 October 1890.

Clarke was the third of five children; his older sister Letitia Marion Dallas (alias Miss Darragh) became a well-known stage actress in Dublin, Manchester and London, while his younger brother Reginald joined the Indian Police in 1900, rising to become Chief Commissioner of Calcutta and receiving a knighthood in 1922. Geoffrey and Reginald were among the few civil servants of that time who reached the top of the Indian bureaucracy without an English public school education.

== Career in the Indian Civil Service ==
Clarke was accepted into the Indian Civil Service (ICS) in 1895 after passing the ICS competitive entrance examination. His first posting was to the Province of Bihar and Orissa as a District Magistrate. In 1903, he was transferred on promotion to the Indian Posts and Telegraphs Department as Director General for the Punjab Province, followed by similar and higher grade posts in Madras, Allahabad, Simla and Calcutta. He became involved in the amalgamation and rapid expansion of India's post and telephone services.

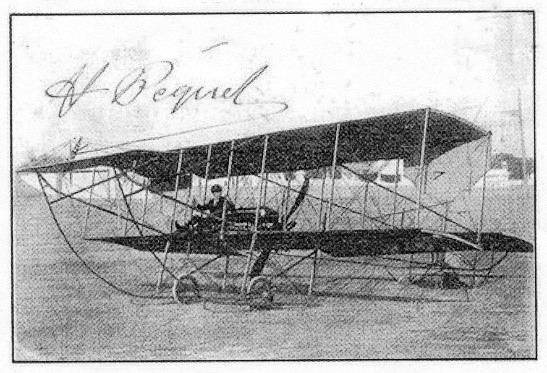
First Official Airmail Flight by Humber-Sommer biplane India 1911

In February 1911, he authorised the world's first official aerial post, flying 6500 mail items five miles from Allahabad across the confluence of the Ganges and Yamuna rivers to Naini railway junction for onward transit. The aircraft was a biplane flown by the French pilot, Henri Pequet. The flight was one of a number of demonstrations given by the Humber Company at The United Provinces Exhibition. A surcharge of six Annas per item raised charitable funds in aid of Holy Trinity Church Allahabad constructing a hostel for Indian students. The Indian Post Office issued special stamps commemorating the event in 1961, 1986, and 2011.

Clarke was recalled to London in 1916 to serve under David Lloyd George in the Ministry of Munitions in order to advise on overcoming the weapons supply crisis in Britain during World War I. He was sent on a special deputation to the United States and Canada to negotiate procurement contracts, and was made an Officer of the Order of the British Empire in 1918 for this service.

On return to India in March 1917, Clarke was appointed Postmaster General of Bengal and Assam. A year later, he was promoted to Director General of Posts and Telegraphs for British India (including Aden, Burma and Ceylon) as well as a member of the Legislative Council of the Governor-General of India. Over his seven-year tenure of the Post Office, he oversaw an increase in postal, telephone and telegraph traffic. By obtaining additional investment funding, wireless and telephone infrastructure were installed and usage, especially long distance, grew rapidly. For employees, no distinction of race was made in promotion or pay, such that by the end of his tenure, most higher appointments in the Post Office were held by Indian nationals, including his successor, GP Roy.

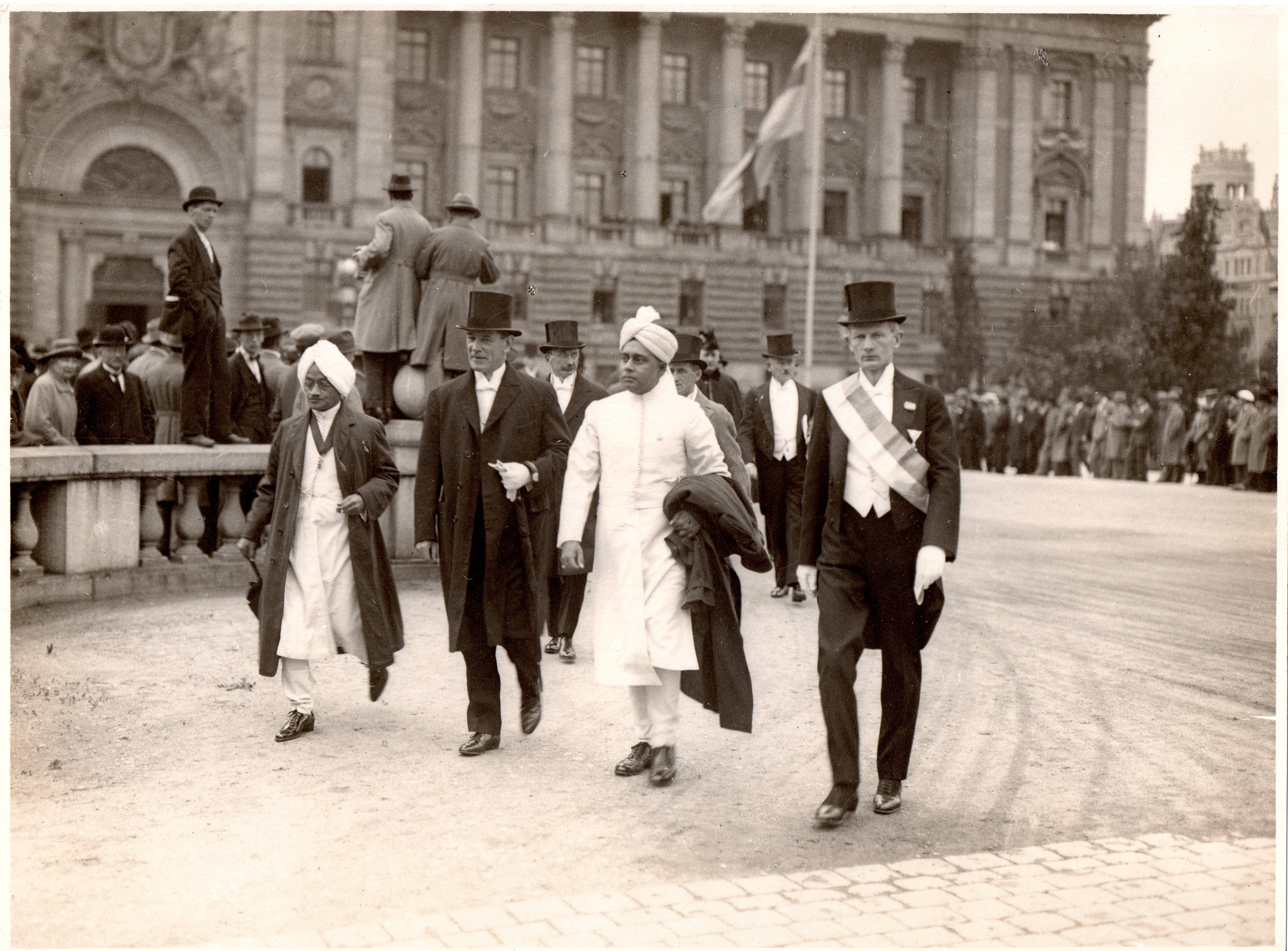
Geoffrey Clarke (second left) with HK Raha and PW Mukerji, Indian delegates to the 1924 Stockholm International Postal Congress

Under his guidance, the Postal Department was the first government department in India to grant official recognition to the organisation of its workers in independent trade unions. By 1925, the All India Postal Staff union had 70,000 members, and its elected President for that year, Muhammad Ali Jinnah, played a key role in the enactment of the Trade Union Act of 1926, whereby the trade union movement of the subcontinent, for the first time, acquired legal cover for unionising unorganised workers.

Clarke represented the Government of India at the International Postal Congresses held in Madrid (1920), Stockholm (1924), and Paris (1925). At Stockholm he defeated a resolution to deprive India of its separate vote as a member of the International Postal Union. He was knighted in 1925.

== Career in British Industry and during World War II ==
After retirement from Imperial Service in 1926, Clarke became a director on the boards of P&O, British-India Steam Navigation Company and the Anglo-Iranian oil companies, and in 1934 became chairman of The Calcutta Tramways Company.

On 1 January 1926, Clarke was employed by the Telegraph Construction and Maintenance Company (Telcon) as joint managing director. Although the firm had just received a large order to manufacture and lay a new 3500 nautical mile telegraph cable under the Pacific Ocean, its future was challenged by competition from short-wave radio and the economic depression of the early 1930s. In 1932, he was appointed sole Managing Director, reorganising and concentrating production facilities. Commercial prospects for the company improved when the product base was broadened to include the manufacture of power cables, high frequency cables and magnetic alloys. Clarke was largely responsible for the decision in 1935 to lay the first transatlantic telephone cable. In the same year, the Company's submarine interests were amalgamated with Siemens Brothers on an equal basis by the formation of Submarine Cables Ltd.

As president of the Association of British Chambers of Commerce from 1936, Clarke made an analysis of the effect of the newly started rearmament program on the structure of British Industry. In 1938, he became a member of the Commonwealth Economic Committee, and of Prime Minister Neville Chamberlain's Advisory Panel of Industrialists on Rearmament. None of the members received payment for their services, but they caused considerable interest from the Americans who anticipated large contracts. Clarke was deputy chairman (1929–1931), chairman (1931–1934), and president of the London Chamber of Commerce (1940–1943). He was President of the Associated Chambers of Commerce of Great Britain (1936–1939) and a member of The Council of Foreign Bondholders.

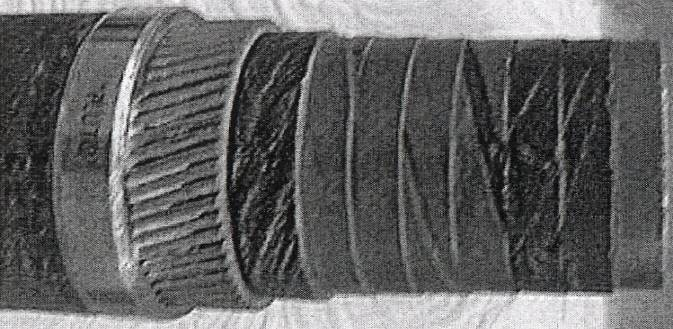
A section of Pluto pipe successively stripped away to reveal the series of layers

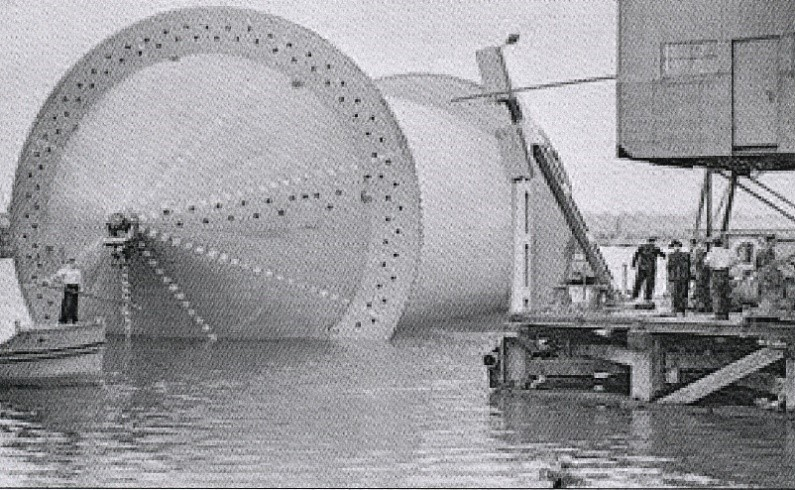
A ‘Conundrum’ being prepared for winding pipe

With his background knowledge of underwater cabling manufacture, Clarke become a member of a British government committee charged with solving the problem of supplying the advancing Allied forces with petrol, while avoiding enemy attack and adverse weather. The answer was the Operation Pluto project, initiated by Lord Mountbatten in 1942. In great secrecy, the committee coordinated the design and manufacture of several hundred miles of flexible pressure resistant piping, through which petrol could be pumped and transported across the English Channel. The pipes were wound in enormous coils called "Conundrums" after their shape, and laid by specially adapted ships. Between August 1944 and May 1945, over 172 million gallons of petrol were delivered to allied forces in France through the PLUTO pipes.

Clarke, who rarely took holidays, retired from his business activities and other interests when forced to do by ill health shortly before his death.

== Personal life ==
Clarke married Hilda Geraldine Seymour on 3 February 1899 at St Peter's Church, Fort William, Calcutta. She was the eldest daughter of Colonel Dr. Charles Seymour of the Royal Army Medical Corps. They outlived three of their five children, and three of their nine grandchildren.

As passengers on BOAC Flight 777, Clarke's only daughter Rotha (Hutcheon) and her two young daughters were killed by enemy action over the Bay of Biscay on 1 June 1943. Other passengers included the actor Leslie Howard. Clarke subsequently commissioned a stained glass window at St. Michael's church, Llan Ffestiniog, Wales, to remember the women and children killed during World War II.

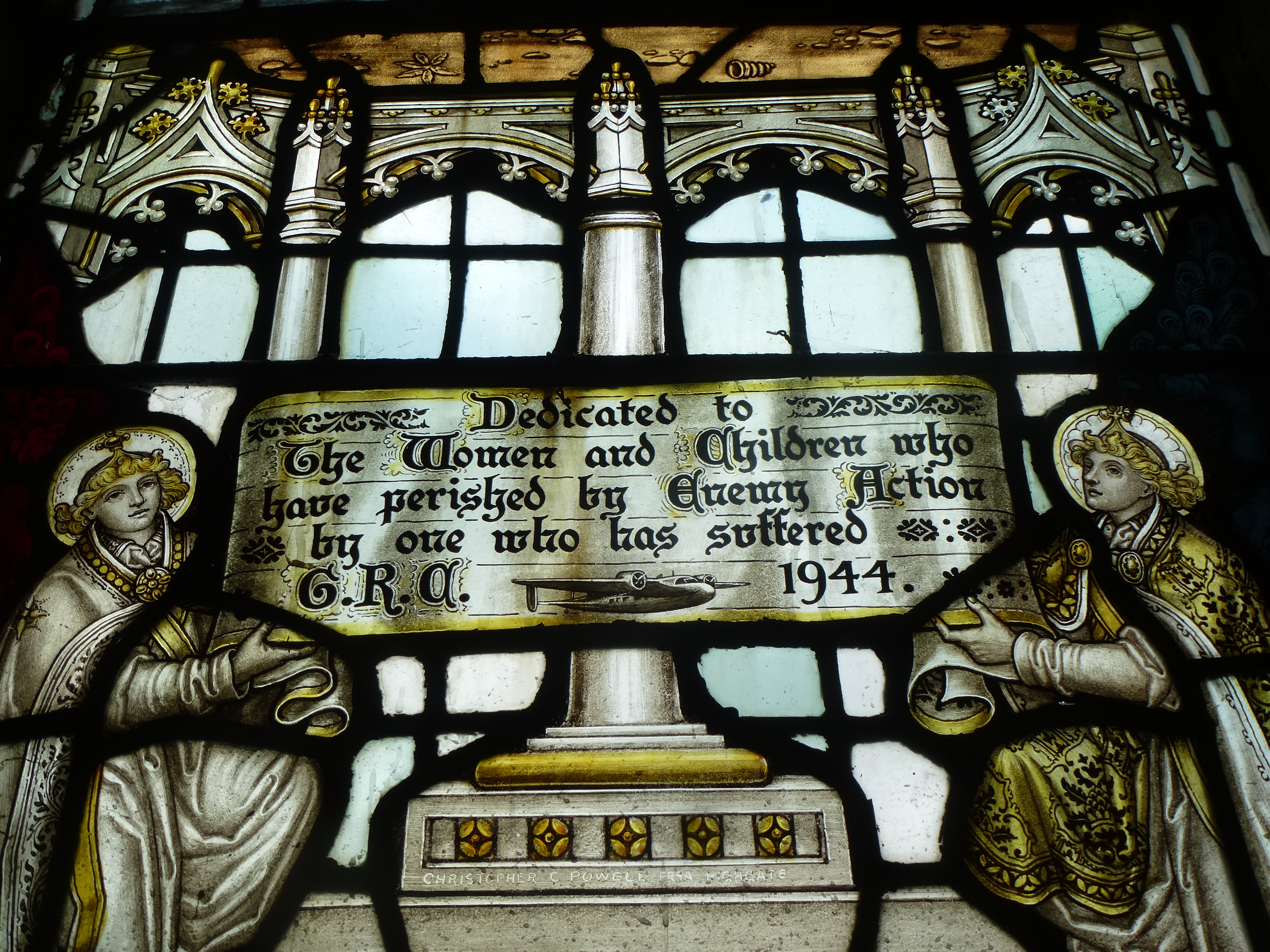
Detail of memorial window commissioned by Geoffrey Rothe Clarke in 1944 for St Michael's church, Llan Ffestiniog, to commemorate the civilian casualties of World War 2. The window erroneously depicts a De Havilland DH.95 Flamingo, rather than the DC3 of Flight 777

Clarke died of cancer on 1 October 1950 at his home in Hove, Sussex, UK, aged 79. A memorial service was held at St Mary le Strand. His widow, Hilda, died on 24 June 1966, also in Hove.

=== Awards and honours ===
- 1918 Officer of the British Empire
- 1921 Companion of the Star of India
- 1923 Serbian Order of St. Sava
- 1925 Knight Bachelor

== Publications ==
- The Outcasts, Being a Brief History of the Maghaya Doms Thacker, Spink & Co 1903
- The Post Office of India and its Story The Bodley Head 1923
