= 1931 Pontypridd by-election =

UK Parliamentary by-election

The 1931 Pontypridd by-election was held on 19 March 1931. The by-election was held due to the resignation of the incumbent Labour MP, Thomas Isaac Mardy Jones. It was won by the Labour candidate David Lewis Davies.

== Result ==
1931 Pontypridd by-election
Party	Candidate	Votes	%	±%
Labour	David Lewis Davies	20,687	59.9	+6.8
Liberal	Geoffrey Crawshay	8,368	24.2	−12.6
Conservative	David J Evans	5,489	15.9	+5.8
Majority		12,319	35.7	+19.3
Turnout		34,544	73.0	−9.0
Registered electors		34,733		
Labour hold		Swing	+9.7	
