= Pontypridd Urban District Council =

Former Welsh urban district council

Pontypridd Urban District Council was a local authority in Glamorgan, Wales. It was created in 1894 as a result of the 1894 Local Government of England and Wales Act. The Council existed until 1973 and replaced the Pontypridd Local Board of Health which had functioned for some years. Its boundaries were set in 1894. Initially, the Council had eighteen members but this number was increased in the 1930s, as a result of the increase in population. There were initially six wards, namely Cilfynydd, Graig, Pontypridd Town, Rhondda, Trallwn and Treforest; a seventh ward, Rhydyfelin, was added in the 1930s.

The first councillors were elected at the December 1894 elections. Most of the first members of the authority had served on the Local Board.

In the years leading up to the First World War, representatives of the Labour Party began to gain ground.

In 1974 the authority was abolished, and together with the former rural district of Llantrisant and Llantwit Fardre, and some outlying areas, formed the Taff Ely Borough Council which, in turn, was subsumed into the unitary authority of Rhondda Cynon Taff in 1996.

== Pontypridd Urban District Council, Chairpersons ==
- James F. Roberts, 1895-1898
- Patrick Gowan, 1898-1899
- R. T. Richards, 1899-1900
- Hugh Bramwell, 1900-1901
- Hopkin Morgan, 1901-1902
- Frederick George Edwards, 1902-1903
- William Lewis, 1903-1904
- William Howell Gronow, 1904-1905
- Edward Williams, 1906-1907
- David Evans, 1908-1909
- Moses Jones, 1909-1910
- David Williams, 1910-1911
- D. R. Evans, 1912-1913
- Hopkin Morgan, 1914-1915
- David Jenkins, 1915-1916
- William Phillips, 1917-1918
- David Lewis Davies, 1918-1919
- Arthur Seaton, 1920-1921
- David Williams, 1921-1922
- Moses Jones, 1922-1923
- Thomas Taylor, 1923-1924
- W. J. Davies, 1924-1925
- David Lewis Davies, 1925-1926
- (Rev) D. G. Hughes, 1927-1928
- Dan Evans, 1928-1929
- Evan Morgan, 1929-1930
- Robert Roper, 1931-1932
- Artemus Seymour, 1933-1934
- George Paget, 1934-1935
- William Jones, 1935-1936
- Jack Jones, 1936-1937
- Arthur Pearson, 1937-1938
- Walter Collier, 1938-1939
- F. Morgan Phillips, 1939-1940
- Jesse Powderhill, 1940-1941
- Evan Morgan, 1941-1942
- Edwin Rowbotham, 1942-1943
- C. H. James, 1943-1945
- Hopkin Smith, 1945-1946
- H. Gardner, 1946-1947
- George Paget, 1947-1948
- David J. Richards, 1948-1949
- H. G. Joshua, 1949-1950
- Blodwen Randall, 1950-1951
- Arthur R. Watkins, 1951-1952
- H. G. A. Dark, 1952-1953
- Arthur Brown, 1953-1954
- John Stallard, 1954-1955
- J. R. Clayton, 1955-1956
- D. G. Ball, 1956-1957
- S. Jones, 1957-1958
- Llewellyn Hopkin, 1958-1959
- J. Howell Davies, 1959-1960
- F. J. C. Warner, 1960-1961
- Emrys W. Peck. 1961-1962
- A. W. B. Higgins, 1962-1963
- Gwladys May Williams, 1963-1964
- J. Ll. Williams, 1964-1965
- Richard Evans, 1965-1966
- Norman J. Randell, 1966-1967
- John Davies, 1967-1968
- William John Cheesman, 1968-1969
- J. C. Anzani, 1969-1970
- Reginald Price, 1970-1971
- Mary G. Murphy, 1971-1972
- G. H. Paget, 1972-1973

== Pontypridd Urban District council election, 1894 ==
The first election to Pontypridd Urban District Council was held in December 1894. Three councillors were elected in each ward.

(**) indicates previous membership of the Local Board of Health.

After the election, the initial composition of the council was as follows.

Party	Councillors	Total
Liberal	10	10
Conservative	5	5
Independent	2	2
Labour	1	1

=== Cilfynydd Ward ===
Cilfynydd Ward 1894
Party	Candidate	Votes	%	±%
Liberal	Thomas Williams	276		
Conservative	William Lewis	251		
Liberal	William Howell Gronow	158		
Conservative	W. H. Watkins	127		
Liberal	Isaac Davies	87		

=== Graig ===
Graig Ward 1894
Party	Candidate	Votes	%	±%
Conservative	David Leyshon**	386		
Liberal	James Spickett	321		
Liberal	Hopkin Morgan**	302		
Lib-Lab	William Morgan	279		
Independent	Samuel Evans	274		

=== Rhondda Ward ===
Rhondda Ward 1894
Party	Candidate	Votes	%	±%
Liberal	Patrick Gowan**	438		
Conservative	Horatio M. Rowlands**	346		
Independent	Hugh Bramwell**	227		
Liberal	Dewi Llewellyn	214		

=== Town Ward ===
Town Ward 1894
Party	Candidate	Votes	%	±%
Liberal	D. R. Evans	249		
Liberal	William Williams	213		
Conservative	William Seaton**	213		
Independent	William R. Beith	203		
Conservative	John Snape**	171		
Liberal	Daniel Arnott	156		
Conservative	George Evans	87		

=== Trallwn Ward ===
Trallwn Ward 1894
Party	Candidate	Votes	%	±%
Independent	Thomas Taylor**	299		
Labour	Frederick George Edwards	271		
Liberal	Watkin Williams	222		
Conservative	H. J. Wilshire	218		
Liberal	Daniel Griffiths	150		
Independent	David Davies	90		

=== Treforest Ward ===
Treforest Ward 1894
Party	Candidate	Votes	%	±%
Conservative	T. R. Hamlen Williams	402		
Liberal	R. T. Richards**	381		
Liberal	James Roberts**	212		
Lib-Lab	Frederick Judd	192		
Independent	J. Gibbon	127		
Liberal	Thomas. O. Brown**	64		

== Pontypridd Urban District council by-election, 1895 ==
Although no elections to Pontypridd Urban District council were scheduled for 1895, the first full year of the council's existence, the death of William Williams created a vacancy in the Town Ward. There was no change to the overall composition of the council, following the by-election held on 13 May 1895.

Town Ward By-Election 1895
Party	Candidate	Votes	%	±%
Liberal	Donald McGregor	215		
Conservative	J. F. McClune	195		

== Pontypridd Urban District council election, 1896 ==
In the Pontypridd Urban District Council election of 1896 there were contests in three of the six wards.

(*) denotes sitting member

=== Cilfynydd Ward ===
Cilfynydd Ward 1896
Party	Candidate	Votes	%	±%
Liberal	William Howell Gronow*	unopposed		

=== Graig Ward ===
Graig Ward 1896
Party	Candidate	Votes	%	±%
Liberal	Hopkin Morgan*	288		
Conservative	Samuel Evans	238		
Liberal	W.C.M. Groves	59		

=== Rhondda Ward ===
Rhondda Ward 1896
Party	Candidate	Votes	%	±%
Liberal	Hugh Bramwell*	unopposed		

=== Town Ward ===
William Seaton, elected the previous year, stood down after the council resolved that he, rather than another member elected in a by-election during the year, should seek re-election.

Town Ward 1896
Party	Candidate	Votes	%	±%
Conservative	Richard Lewis Phillips	272		
Liberal	Daniel Arnott	249		

=== Trallwn Ward ===
Trallwn Ward
Party	Candidate	Votes	%	±%
Liberal	Watkin Williams*	326		
Conservative	Edward Williams	253		

=== Treforest Ward ===
Treforest Ward 1896
Party	Candidate	Votes	%	±%
Liberal	James Roberts	unopposed		

== Pontypridd Urban District council by-election, 1896 ==
A by-election was held in Cilfynydd at the end of April 1896 to fill the vacancy left by the departure of Thomas Williams.

Cilfynydd Ward By-Election 1896
Party	Candidate	Votes	%	±%
Liberal	T. B. Evans	326		
Conservative	W. H. Watkins	206		

== Pontypridd Urban District council election, 1897 ==
In the Pontypridd Urban District Council election of 1897 there were contests in three of the six wards.

(*) denotes sitting member

=== Cilfynydd Ward ===
Cilfynydd Ward 1897
Party	Candidate	Votes	%	±%
	William Lewis*	unopposed		

=== Graig Ward ===
Graig Ward 1897
Party	Candidate	Votes	%	±%
Liberal	James E. Spickett*	334		
Conservative	Samuel Evans	331		

=== Rhondda Ward ===
Rhondda Ward 1897
Party	Candidate	Votes	%	±%
Liberal	Dewi Llewellyn	532		
Conservative	Horatio M. Rowlands*	457		

=== Town Ward ===
Town Ward 1897
Party	Candidate	Votes	%	±%
Conservative	William Jones-Powell	205		
Liberal	Donald McGregor*	190		
Independent	Arthur O. Evans	141		

=== Trallwn Ward ===
Trallwn Ward 1897
Party	Candidate	Votes	%	±%
Labour	Frederick George Edwards*	unopposed		

=== Treforest Ward ===
Treforest Ward 1897
Party	Candidate	Votes	%	±%
Liberal	R. T. Richards*	unopposed		

== Pontypridd Urban District council election, 1898 ==
In the Pontypridd Urban District Council election of 1898 there were contests in three of the six wards.

(*) denotes sitting member

=== Cilfynydd Ward ===
Cilfynydd Ward 1898
Party	Candidate	Votes	%	±%
Liberal	W. R. Davies	unopposed		

=== Graig Ward ===
Graig Ward 1898
Party	Candidate	Votes	%	±%
Conservative	W. T. Leyshon	356		
Liberal	J. W. Jones	207		
Labour	Moses Severn	83		

=== Rhondda Ward ===
Rhondda Ward 1898
Party	Candidate	Votes	%	±%
Liberal	Patrick Gowan*	638		
	T. Jones	336		

=== Town Ward ===
Town Ward 1898
Party	Candidate	Votes	%	±%
Liberal	D. R. Evans*	319		
Independent	Edwin Phillips	267		

=== Trallwn Ward ===
Trallwn Ward 1898
Party	Candidate	Votes	%	±%
Conservative	Edward Williams	390		
Liberal	Thomas Taylor	306		

=== Treforest Ward ===
Treforest Ward 1898
Party	Candidate	Votes	%	±%
Conservative	T. R. Hamlen Williams	424		
	Benjamin Rees	302		

== Pontypridd Urban District council election, 1899 ==
In the Pontypridd Urban District Council election of 1899 there were contests in two of the six wards.

(*) denotes sitting member

=== Cilfynydd Ward ===
Cilfynydd Ward 1899
Party	Candidate	Votes	%	±%
Liberal	William Howell Gronow	unopposed		

=== Graig Ward ===
Graig Ward 1899
Party	Candidate	Votes	%	±%
Liberal	Hopkin Morgan	unopposed		

=== Rhondda Ward ===
Rhondda Ward 1899
Party	Candidate	Votes	%	±%
Liberal	Hugh Bramwell	unopposed		

=== Town Ward ===
Town Ward 1899
Party	Candidate	Votes	%	±%
Conservative	Richard Lewis Phillips	350		
Liberal	Thomas Rowlands	192		

=== Trallwn Ward ===
Trallwn Ward 1899
Party	Candidate	Votes	%	±%
Liberal	Thomas Taylor	464		
Liberal	Watkin Williams*	314		

=== Treforest Ward ===
Treforest Ward 1899
Party	Candidate	Votes	%	±%
Liberal	James Roberts	unopposed		

== Pontypridd Urban District council election, 1900 ==
In the Pontypridd Urban District Council election of 1900 there were contests in four of the six wards.

(*) denotes sitting member

=== Cilfynydd Ward ===
Cilfynydd Ward 1900
Party	Candidate	Votes	%	±%
	William Lewis*	unopposed		

=== Graig Ward ===
Graig Ward 1900
Party	Candidate	Votes	%	±%
Conservative	Samuel Evans	364		
Independent	Henry Hibbert	289		

=== Rhondda Ward ===
Rhondda Ward 1900
Party	Candidate	Votes	%	±%
Conservative	John Thomas	350		
Conservative	Horatio M. Rowlands*	342		
Liberal	William Phillips	270		
Liberal	Benjamin Jones	3		

=== Town Ward ===
Town Ward 1900
Party	Candidate	Votes	%	±%
Conservative	William Jones-Powell*	290		
Liberal	Donald McGregor	257		

=== Trallwn Ward ===
Trallwn Ward 1900
Party	Candidate	Votes	%	±%
Labour	Frederick George Edwards*	476		
Liberal	William Thomas	284		

=== Treforest Ward ===
Treforest Ward 1900
Party	Candidate	Votes	%	±%
Liberal	R. T. Richards*	unopposed		

== Pontypridd Urban District council election, 1901 ==
In the Pontypridd Urban District Council election of 1901 there were contests in four of the six wards.

(*) denotes sitting member

=== Cilfynydd Ward ===
Cilfynydd Ward 1901
Party	Candidate	Votes	%	±%
Liberal	T. B. Evans	unopposed		

=== Graig ===
Graig Ward 1901
Party	Candidate	Votes	%	±%
Independent	Henry Hibbert	387		
Labour	Moses Severn	195		

=== Rhondda Ward ===
Rhondda Ward 1901
Party	Candidate	Votes	%	±%
	David Thomas	556		
Conservative	Horatio M. Rowland*	196		

=== Town Ward ===
Town Ward 1901
Party	Candidate	Votes	%	±%
Conservative	Arthur Seaton	324		
Liberal	D. R. Evans*	299		

=== Trallwn Ward ===
Trallwn Ward 1901
Party	Candidate	Votes	%	±%
Conservative	Edward Williams	unopposed		

=== Treforest Ward ===
Treforest Ward 1901
Party	Candidate	Votes	%	±%
	D. Evans	403		
	J. Gibbon	219		

== Pontypridd Urban District council election, 1902 ==
In the Pontypridd Urban District Council election of 1902 there were contests in two of the six wards.

(*) denotes sitting member

=== Cilfynydd Ward ===
Cilfynydd Ward 1902
Party	Candidate	Votes	%	±%
Liberal	William Howell Gronow*	unopposed		

=== Graig ===
Graig Ward 1902
Party	Candidate	Votes	%	±%
Liberal	Hopkin Morgan*	unopposed		

=== Rhondda Ward ===
Rhondda Ward 1902
Party	Candidate	Votes	%	±%
Liberal	Hugh Bramwell*	681		
Labour	David Thomas	238		

=== Town Ward ===
Town Ward 1902
Party	Candidate	Votes	%	±%
Liberal	William Jones	332		
Conservative	Richard Lewis Phillips*	276		

=== Trallwn Ward ===
Trallwn Ward 1902
Party	Candidate	Votes	%	±%
Liberal	Thomas Taylor*	unopposed		

=== Treforest Ward ===
Treforest Ward 1902
Party	Candidate	Votes	%	±%
Liberal	James Roberts*	unopposed		

== Pontypridd Urban District council election, 1903 ==
In the Pontypridd Urban District Council election of 1903 there were contests in three of the six wards.

(*) denotes sitting member

=== Cilfynydd Ward ===
Cilfynydd Ward 1903
Party	Candidate	Votes	%	±%
	William Lewis*	unopposed		

=== Graig Ward ===
Graig Ward 1903
Party	Candidate	Votes	%	±%
Liberal	David Williams	402		
Independent	Father MacManus	156		
Liberal	G. G. Jones	147		
Conservative	Frederick King	35		

=== Rhondda Ward ===
Rhondda Ward 1903
Party	Candidate	Votes	%	±%
Labour	Moses Jones	398		
Conservative	John Thomas*	388		

=== Town Ward ===
Town Ward 1903
Party	Candidate	Votes	%	±%
Liberal	Daniel Arnott	367		
Conservative	William Jones-Powell*	265		

=== Trallwn Ward ===
Trallwn Ward 1903
Party	Candidate	Votes	%	±%
Labour	Frederick George Edwards*	unopposed		

=== Treforest Ward ===
Treforest Ward 1903
Party	Candidate	Votes	%	±%
Liberal	R. T. Richards*	unopposed		

== Pontypridd Urban District council by-election, 1903 ==
A by-election was held in the Town ward in May 1903 to fill the vacancy left by the resignation of Arthur Seaton.

Town Ward By-election 1903
Party	Candidate	Votes	%	±%
Liberal	D. R. Evans	375		
Conservative	R. L. Phillips	276		

== Pontypridd Urban District council election, 1904 ==
In the Pontypridd Urban District Council election of 1904 there were contests in three of the six wards.

(*) denotes sitting member

=== Cilfynydd Ward ===
Cilfynydd Ward 1904
Party	Candidate	Votes	%	±%
Liberal	T. B. Evans*	unopposed		

=== Graig Ward ===
Graig Ward 1904
Party	Candidate	Votes	%	±%
Liberal	Aneurin T. Evans	206		
	W. J. Davies	199		
Independent	Henry Hibbert*	136		
	J. W. John	88		

=== Rhondda Ward ===
Rhondda Ward 1904
Party	Candidate	Votes	%	±%
Lib-Lab	David Thomas	unopposed		

=== Town Ward ===
Town Ward 1904
Party	Candidate	Votes	%	±%
Liberal	D. R. Evans*	382		
	W. Jones	268		

=== Trallwn Ward ===
Trallwn Ward 1904
Party	Candidate	Votes	%	±%
Independent	Edward Williams	471		
Liberal	John Lewis	427		

=== Treforest Ward ===
Treforest Ward 1904
Party	Candidate	Votes	%	±%
	D. Evans*	unopposed		

== Pontypridd Urban District council election, 1905 ==
In the Pontypridd Urban District Council election of 1905 there was a contest in only one of the six wards.

(*) denotes sitting member

=== Cilfynydd Ward ===
Cilfynydd Ward 1905
Party	Candidate	Votes	%	±%
Liberal	William Howell Gronow*	unopposed		

=== Graig Ward ===
Graig Ward 1905
Party	Candidate	Votes	%	±%
Liberal	Hopkin Morgan*	563		
Independent	Henry Hibbert	192		

=== Rhondda Ward ===
Rhondda Ward 1905
Party	Candidate	Votes	%	±%
Liberal	Hugh Bramwell*	unopposed		

=== Town Ward ===
Town Ward 1905
Party	Candidate	Votes	%	±%
Liberal	William Jones*	unopposed		

Note: Jones's potential opponent, H. E. Crane, dropped out of the race before election day.

=== Trallwn Ward ===
Trallwn Ward 1905
Party	Candidate	Votes	%	±%
Liberal	Thomas Taylor*	unopposed		

=== Treforest Ward ===
Treforest Ward 1905
Party	Candidate	Votes	%	±%
Liberal	James Roberts*	unopposed		

== Pontypridd Urban District council election, 1906 ==
In the Pontypridd Urban District Council election of 1906 there were contests in three of the six wards.

(*) denotes sitting member

=== Cilfynydd Ward ===
Cilfynydd Ward 1906
Party	Candidate	Votes	%	±%
	William Lewis*	unopposed		

=== Graig Ward ===
Graig Ward 1906
Party	Candidate	Votes	%	±%
Liberal	David Williams*	unopposed		

=== Rhondda Ward ===
Rhondda Ward 1906
Party	Candidate	Votes	%	±%
Labour	Moses Jones*	603		
	W. Thomas	480		

=== Town Ward ===
Town Ward 1906
Party	Candidate	Votes	%	±%
Liberal	Daniel Arnott*	unopposed		

=== Trallwn Ward ===
Trallwn Ward 1906
Party	Candidate	Votes	%	±%
Liberal	M. Julian	363		
Liberal	W. C. Hinckley	315		
Labour	W. Byer	258		

=== Treforest Ward ===
Treforest Ward 1906
Party	Candidate	Votes	%	±%
Liberal	R. T. Richards*	657		
Independent	Henry Hibbert	102		

== Pontypridd Urban District council election, 1907 ==
In the Pontypridd Urban District Council election of 1907 there were contests in four of the six wards.

(*) denotes sitting member

=== Cilfynydd Ward ===
Cilfynydd Ward 1907
Party	Candidate	Votes	%	±%
Liberal	T. B. Evans*	unopposed		

=== Graig Ward ===
Graig Ward 1907
Party	Candidate	Votes	%	±%
Liberal	Aneurin T. Evans*	365		
Independent	Henry Hibbert	265		
Conservative	Thomas Jones	144		

=== Rhondda Ward ===
Rhondda Ward 1907
Party	Candidate	Votes	%	±%
Lib-Lab	David Thomas*	648		
Liberal	E. Jenkins	467		

=== Town Ward ===
Town Ward 1907
Party	Candidate	Votes	%	±%
Liberal	D. R. Evans*	367		
Conservative	Arthur Seaton	315		

=== Trallwn Ward ===
Trallwn Ward 1907
Party	Candidate	Votes	%	±%
Independent	Edward Williams*	469		
Liberal	John Lewis	455		

=== Treforest Ward ===
Treforest Ward 1907
Party	Candidate	Votes	%	±%
	D. Evans*	unopposed		

== Pontypridd Urban District council election, 1908 ==
In the Pontypridd Urban District Council election of 1908 there were contests in three of the six wards, most notably in Cilfynydd - the first contested election there since the by-election in 1896.

(*) denotes sitting member

=== Cilfynydd Ward ===
Cilfynydd Ward 1908
Party	Candidate	Votes	%	±%
Lib-Lab	William Howell Gronow*	478		
Labour	Artemus Seymour	160		

=== Graig Ward ===
Graig Ward 1908
Party	Candidate	Votes	%	±%
Liberal	Hopkin Morgan*	344		
Independent	Henry Hibbert	221		
Labour	J. Baker	101		

=== Rhondda Ward ===
Rhondda Ward 1908
Party	Candidate	Votes	%	±%
Liberal	Hugh Bramwell*	unopposed		

=== Town Ward ===
Town Ward 1908
Party	Candidate	Votes	%	±%
Conservative	Arthur Seaton	364		
Liberal	William Jones*	321		

=== Trallwn Ward ===
Trallwn Ward 1908
Party	Candidate	Votes	%	±%
Liberal	Thomas Taylor*	unopposed		

=== Treforest Ward ===
Treforest Ward 1908
Party	Candidate	Votes	%	±%
Liberal	James Roberts*	unopposed		

== Notable members of the Council ==
- Walter Morgan, solicitor
- Arthur Pearson, Member of Parliament.
- David Lewis Davies, Member of Parliament

== Bibliography ==
- Parry, Jon (1989). "Labour Leaders and Local Politics 1888-1902: The Example of Aberdare". Welsh History Review. 14 (3): 399–416.
