= Pontypridd (UK Parliament constituency) =

UK Parliament constituency (1918–)

Coordinates: 51.601°N 3.350°W

- County constituency for the House of Commons
- Boundary of Pontypridd in Wales
- Preserved county: Mid Glamorgan
- Electorate: 73,743 (March 2020)
- Major settlements: Pontypridd, Llantrisant, Mountain Ash, Abercynon, Treforest, Beddau

Current constituency
- Created: 1918
- Member of Parliament: Alex Davies-Jones (Labour)
- Seats: One
- Created from: South Glamorganshire and East Glamorganshire

Overlaps
- Senedd: Pontypridd Cynon Merthyr

Pontypridd (/ˌpɒntɪˈpriːð/ PON-tih-PREEDH) is a constituency (Note: A borough constituency (for the purposes of election expenses and type of returning officer)) represented in the House of Commons of the UK Parliament since 2019 by Alex Davies-Jones of the Labour Party. (Note: As with all constituencies, the constituency elects one Member of Parliament (MP) by the first past the post system of election at least every five years.)

The constituency retained its name, but with substantial boundary changes, as part of the 2023 review of Westminster constituencies and under the June 2023 final recommendations of the Boundary Commission for Wales for the 2024 general election.

== Boundaries ==
=== 1918–1983 ===
The Pontypridd constituency was created in its original form from parts of the old South Glamorganshire & East Glamorganshire constituencies as part of the Representation of the People Act 1918 (sometimes referred to as 'The Fourth Reform Act') which granted virtually all men over 21 the right to vote, extended voting rights to women over 30 years of age, & increased the number of the now abolished University constituencies. Part of this Act also effected a 'General Redistribution of Seats' on an 'equitable basis'. It originally included the old Borough of Cowbridge, the Cowbridge Rural District (which included Ystradowen, St Athan, Llantwit Major & Llandow) & the Urban District of Pontypridd plus the Rural District of Llantrisant & Llantwit Fardre. The constituency remained unchanged from this form until the boundary changes implemented in 1983.

=== 1983–2010 ===
Under the Third Periodic Parliamentary Boundary Review's proposals, Cowbridge Borough and the southern part of the former Cowbridge Rural District were removed and placed in the Vale of Glamorgan constituency, and additionally the communities of Llanharry, Llanharan, and Brynna (i.e. the northern part of the former Cowbridge RDC) were moved into the Ogmore constituency. However, the communities of Creigiau and Pentyrch were added to the seat at this time.

=== 2010–2024 ===
Map of boundaries 2010–2024

The Fifth Periodic Parliamentary Boundary Review for Wales placed the Cilfynydd and Glyncoch wards in the Cynon Valley (UK Parliament constituency), and the Creigiau and Pentyrch wards in the Cardiff West (UK Parliament constituency). These changes were put in place for the 2010 general election. The revised Pontypridd constituency could be split into two parts, a northern part containing the town itself, and a southern part focused on Llantrisant. In Pontypridd township itself the wards are: Town, Treforest, Rhondda (consisting of Hopkinstown, Maesycoed, Pantygraigwen, Trehafod, and Pwllgwaun), Graig, Trallwng, Rhydyfelin Central/Ilan, and Hawthorn. The southern half consisted of the following wards: Taff's Well, Beddau, Church Village, Tonteg, Llantwit Fardre, Llantrisant, Pontyclun, Talbot Green, Tonyrefail East and Tonyrefail West.

=== 2024–present ===
Map of current boundaries

Under the 2023 boundary review, the constituency was defined as being composed of the following wards of the County Borough of Rhondda Cynon Taf, as they existed on 1 December 2020:

- Abercynon; Beddau; Brynna; Church Village; Cilfynydd; Glyncoch; Graig; Hawthorn; Llanharan; Llanharry; Llantrisant Town; Llantwit Fardre; Mountain Ash East; Mountain Ash West; Penrhiwceiber; Pontypridd Town; Rhondda; Rhydfelen Central/Ilan; Talbot Green; Ton-teg; Trallwng; Treforest; Tyn-y-nant; Ynysybwl.

The constituency was extended northwards, taking a substantial part of the abolished Cynon Valley constituency comprising the wards of Abercynon, Cilfynydd, Glyncoch, Mountain Ash East, Mountain Ash West, Penrhiwceiber, and Ynysybwl. In addition, Llanharry, Llanharan, and Brynna were returned from Ogmore, which was now also abolished. To partly compensate, Taff's Well was transferred to Cardiff North; Pontyclun to Cardiff West; and Tonyrefail to the new constituency of Rhondda and Ogmore.

Following local government boundary reviews which came into effect in May 2022, the constituency now comprises the following Rhondda Cynon Taf wards from the 2024 general election:

- Abercynon; Beddau and Tyn-y-nant; Brynna and Llanharan; Church Village; Cilfynydd; Glyn-coch; Graig and Pontypridd West; Hawthorn and Lower Rhydfelen; Llanharry; Llantrisant Town and Talbot Green; Llantwit Fardre; Mountain Ash; Penrhiw-ceiber; Pontyclun West (part); Pontypridd Town; Rhydfelen Central; Ton-teg; Trallwng; Treforest; Upper Rhydfelen and Glyn-taf; Ynysybwl.

== Constituency profile ==
One can think of the constituency as being divided between a 'suburban' district in the south and communities that grew in the industrial revolution to the north; the southern area, particularly between Church Village and Llantrisant, contains much new residential and light industrial development, and benefits from good transport links due to its proximity to the M4. This section has a growing population and is an important 'dormitory' for Cardiff. The northern parts, particularly Tonyrefail and the northern end of Pontypridd town consists of large sections of 19th century housing and suffered high unemployment in the 1980s as the old industries closed. However, in recent years, economic recovery has been firm, especially considered with neighbouring constituencies to the north.

== Members of Parliament ==
Like many seats in South Wales, Pontypridd has been held by the Labour Party for over 100 years. In all the years since the Labour Party first took the seat in the 1922 by-election, its smallest majority has been 2,785 (7.6%) by which it has held the seat over the Liberal Democrats in 2010. Generally, its majorities have been considerably higher.

Election	Member	Party
1918	Thomas Arthur Lewis	Coalition Liberal
Jan 1922	Thomas Arthur Lewis	National Liberal
1922 by-election	Thomas Mardy Jones	Labour
1931 by-election	David Lewis Davies	Labour
1938 by-election	Arthur Pearson	Labour
1970	Brynmor John	Labour
1989 by-election	Dr Kim Howells	Labour
2010	Owen Smith	Labour
2019	Alex Davies-Jones	Labour

== Elections ==
=== Elections in the 1910s ===
T.A. Lewis

1918 general election: Pontypridd^{d}
Party		Candidate	Votes	%
C	National Liberal	Thomas Arthur Lewis	13,327	56.1
	Labour	David Lewis Davies	10,152	42.8
	Conservative	Arthur Seaton	260	1.1
Majority			3,175	13.3
Turnout			23,739	68.3
Registered electors			34,778	
	National Liberal win (new seat)			
C indicates candidate endorsed by the coalition government.

=== Elections in the 1920s ===
1922 Pontypridd by-election
Party		Candidate	Votes	%	±%
	Labour	Thomas Mardy Jones	16,630	57.0	+14.2
C	National Liberal	Thomas Arthur Lewis	12,550	43.0	−13.1
Majority			4,080	14.0	N/A
Turnout			29,180	72.8	+4.5
Registered electors			40,071		
	Labour gain from National Liberal		Swing		
C indicates candidate endorsed by the coalition government.

1922 general election: Pontypridd
Party	Candidate	Votes	%	±%
Labour	Thomas Mardy Jones	14,884	47.2	+4.4
National Liberal	Rhys Rhys-Williams	8,667	27.5	−28.6
Unionist	J Griffith Jones	7,994	25.4	N/A
Majority		6,217	19.7	N/A
Turnout		31,545	76.8	+8.5
Registered electors		41,087		
Labour hold		Swing		

1923 general election: Pontypridd
Party	Candidate	Votes	%	±%
Labour	Thomas Mardy Jones	16,837	54.9	+7.7
Liberal	Jon David Rees	13,839	45.1	+17.6
Majority		2,998	9.8	−9.9
Turnout		30,676	76.0	−0.8
Registered electors		40,379		
Labour hold		Swing	−6.0	

1924 general election: Pontypridd
Party	Candidate	Votes	%	±%
Labour	Thomas Mardy Jones	18,301	55.9	+1.0
Conservative	David J. Evans	14,425	44.1	N/A
Majority		3,876	11.9	+2.1
Turnout		32,726	79.6	+3.6
Registered electors		41,099		
Labour hold		Swing	+1.0	

1929 general election: Pontypridd
Party	Candidate	Votes	%	±%
Labour	Thomas Mardy Jones	20,835	53.1	−2.8
Liberal	John Victor Evans	14,421	36.8	N/A
Conservative	May Gordon Williams	3,967	10.1	−34.0
Majority		6,414	16.3	+4.4
Turnout		39,223	82.0	+2.4
Registered electors		47,860		
Labour hold		Swing	+2.3	

=== Elections in the 1930s ===
1931 Pontypridd by-election
Party	Candidate	Votes	%	±%
Labour	David Lewis Davies	20,687	59.9	+6.8
Liberal	Geoffrey Crawshay	8,368	24.3	−12.5
Conservative	David J Evans	5,489	15.9	+5.8
Majority		12,319	35.6	+19.3
Turnout		34,544	73.0	−9.0
Registered electors		34,733		
Labour hold		Swing	+9.7	

1931 general election: Pontypridd
Party	Candidate	Votes	%	±%
Labour	David Lewis Davies	21,751	58.4	+5.3
Liberal	Bernard Acworth	13,937	37.4	+0.6
Independent Labour	Thomas Mardy Jones	1,110	3.0	N/A
New Party	William Lowell	466	1.3	N/A
Majority		7,814	21.0	+4.7
Turnout		37,264	78.7	−3.3
Registered electors		47,346		
Labour hold		Swing	+2.3	

1935 general election: Pontypridd
Party	Candidate	Votes	%	±%
Labour	David Lewis Davies	Unopposed		
Registered electors		48,469		
Labour hold				

1938 Pontypridd by-election
Party	Candidate	Votes	%	±%
Labour	Arthur Pearson^{c}	22,159	59.9	N/A
National Liberal	Juliet Rhys-Williams	14,810	40.1	N/A
Majority		7,349	19.8	N/A
Turnout		36,969	69.3	N/A
Registered electors		36,846		
Labour hold		Swing	N/A	

=== Elections in the 1940s ===
1945 general election: Pontypridd
Party	Candidate	Votes	%	±%
Labour	Arthur Pearson	27,823	68.6	N/A
Conservative	Cennydd Traherne	7,260	17.9	N/A
Liberal	John Ellis Williams	5,464	13.5	N/A
Majority		20,563	50.7	N/A
Turnout		40,547	76.0	N/A
Registered electors		53,346		
Labour hold		Swing	N/A	

=== Elections in the 1950s ===
1950 general election: Pontypridd
Party	Candidate	Votes	%	±%
Labour	Arthur Pearson	30,945	68.9	+0.3
Conservative	Thomas Esmôr Rhys Rhys-Roberts	9,049	20.2	+2.3
Liberal	David Irwin Charles Lewis	4,895	10.9	−2.6
Majority		21,896	48.7	−2.0
Turnout		44,889	84.3	+8.3
Registered electors		53,275		
Labour hold		Swing	−1.0	

1951 general election: Pontypridd
Party	Candidate	Votes	%	±%
Labour	Arthur Pearson	32,586	72.3	+3.4
Conservative	James Lionel Manning	12,511	27.7	+7.5
Majority		20,075	44.6	−4.1
Turnout		45,097	83.3	−1.0
Registered electors		54,126		
Labour hold		Swing	−2.1	

1955 general election: Pontypridd
Party	Candidate	Votes	%	±%
Labour	Arthur Pearson	28,881	71.1	−1.2
Conservative	Thomas Tyrrell	11,718	28.9	+1.2
Majority		17,163	42.2	−2.4
Turnout		40,599	74.9	−8.4
Registered electors		54,214		
Labour hold		Swing	−1.1	

1959 general election: Pontypridd
Party	Candidate	Votes	%	±%
Labour	Arthur Pearson	29,853	68.2	−2.9
Conservative	Brandon Rhys-Williams	13,896	31.8	+2.9
Majority		15,957	36.4	−5.8
Turnout		43,749	81.2	+6.3
Registered electors		53,903		
Labour hold		Swing	−2.9	

=== Elections in the 1960s ===
1964 general election: Pontypridd
Party	Candidate	Votes	%	±%
Labour	Arthur Pearson	29,533	71.4	+3.2
Conservative	John Warrender	11,859	28.6	−3.2
Majority		17,674	42.8	+6.4
Turnout		41,392	76.9	−4.3
Registered electors		53,859		
Labour hold		Swing	+3.2	

1966 general election: Pontypridd
Party	Candidate	Votes	%	±%
Labour	Arthur Pearson	30,840	74.9	+3.5
Conservative	Kenneth Green-Wanstall	10,325	25.1	−3.5
Majority		20,515	49.8	+7.0
Turnout		41,365	74.7	−2.2
Registered electors		55,088		
Labour hold		Swing	+3.6	

=== Elections in the 1970s ===
1970 general election: Pontypridd
Party	Candidate	Votes	%	±%
Labour	Brynmor John	28,414	58.5	−16.4
Conservative	Michael Withers	8,205	16.9	−8.2
Liberal	Mary Murphy	6,871	14.2	N/A
Plaid Cymru	Errol Jones	5,059	10.4	N/A
Majority		20,209	41.6	−8.2
Turnout		48,549	74.4	−0.3
Registered electors		65,265		
Labour hold		Swing	−4.1	

February 1974 general election: Pontypridd
Party	Candidate	Votes	%	±%
Labour	Brynmor John	28,028	52.0	−6.5
Conservative	Alun Jones	11,406	21.1	+4.2
Liberal	Mary Murphy	9,889	18.3	+4.1
Plaid Cymru	Richard Kemp	4,612	8.6	−1.8
Majority		16,622	30.9	−10.7
Turnout		53,935	77.4	+3.0
Registered electors		69,685		
Labour hold		Swing	−5.4	

October 1974 general election: Pontypridd
Party	Candidate	Votes	%	±%
Labour	Brynmor John	29,302	56.6	+4.6
Conservative	Alun Jones	10,528	20.3	−0.8
Liberal	Mary Murphy	8,050	15.5	−2.8
Plaid Cymru	Richard Kemp	3,917	7.6	−1.0
Majority		18,774	36.3	+5.5
Turnout		51,797	73.8	−3.6
Registered electors		70,200		
Labour hold		Swing	+2.7	

1979 general election: Pontypridd
Party	Candidate	Votes	%	±%
Labour	Brynmor John	32,801	56.0	−0.6
Conservative	Michael Clay	17,114	29.2	+8.9
Liberal	Hugh Penri-Williams	6,228	10.6	−4.9
Plaid Cymru	Alun Roberts	2,200	3.8	−3.8
National Front	R G Davies	263	0.4	N/A
Majority		15,687	26.8	−9.5
Turnout		58,606	78.1	+4.3
Registered electors		75,050^{b}		
Labour hold		Swing	−4.7	

=== Elections in the 1980s ===
1983 general election: Pontypridd^{a}
Party	Candidate	Votes	%	±%
Labour	Brynmor John	20,188	45.6	−10.4
SDP	Richard Langridge	11,444	25.9	+15.3
Conservative	Richard Evans	10,139	22.9	−6.3
Plaid Cymru	Janet Davies	2,065	4.7	+0.9
Green	Alwyn K. Jones	449	1.0	N/A
Majority		8,744	19.7	−7.1
Turnout		44,285	72.7	−5.4
Registered electors		60,883		
Labour hold		Swing	−5.2	

1987 general election: Pontypridd
Party	Candidate	Votes	%	±%
Labour	Brynmor John	26,422	56.3	+10.7
Conservative	Desmond Swayne	9,145	19.5	−3.4
SDP	Peter Sain-Ley-Berry	8,865	18.9	−7.0
Plaid Cymru	Delme Bowen	2,498	5.3	+0.6
Majority		17,277	36.8	+17.1
Turnout		46,930	76.6	+3.9
Registered electors		61,255		
Labour hold		Swing	+7.1	

1989 Pontypridd by-election
Party	Candidate	Votes	%	±%
Labour	Kim Howells	20,549	53.4	−2.9
Plaid Cymru	Syd Morgan	9,775	25.3	+20.0
Conservative	Nigel Evans	5,212	13.5	−6.0
SLD	Tom Ellis	1,500	3.9	−15.0
SDP	Terry Thomas	1,199	3.1	N/A
Communist	David Richards	239	0.6	N/A
Independent	David Black	57	0.1	N/A
Majority		10,794	28.1	−8.7
Turnout		38,511	62.0	−14.6
Registered electors		61,193		
Labour hold		Swing	−11.5	

=== Elections in the 1990s ===
1992 general election: Pontypridd
Party	Candidate	Votes	%	±%
Labour	Kim Howells	29,722	60.8	+4.5
Conservative	Peter D. Donnelly	9,925	20.3	+0.8
Plaid Cymru	Delme Bowen	4,448	9.1	+3.8
Liberal Democrats	Steve Belzak	4,180	8.5	−10.4
Green	Emma J. Jackson	615	1.3	N/A
Majority		19,797	40.5	+3.7
Turnout		48,890	79.3	+2.7
Registered electors		61,685		
Labour hold		Swing	+1.8	

1997 general election: Pontypridd
Party	Candidate	Votes	%	±%
Labour	Kim Howells	29,290	63.9	+3.1
Liberal Democrats	Nigel Howells	6,161	13.4	+4.9
Conservative	Jonathan M. Cowen	5,910	12.9	−7.4
Plaid Cymru	Owain Llewelyn	2,977	6.5	−2.6
Referendum	John Wood	874	1.9	N/A
Socialist Labour	Peter Skelly	380	0.8	N/A
Communist	Robert Griffiths	178	0.4	N/A
Natural Law	Anthony G. Moore	85	0.2	N/A
Majority		23,129	50.4	+9.9
Turnout		45,855	71.4	−7.9
Registered electors		64,185		
Labour hold		Swing	−0.9	

=== Elections in the 2000s ===
2001 general election: Pontypridd
Party	Candidate	Votes	%	±%
Labour	Kim Howells	22,963	59.9	−4.0
Plaid Cymru	Bleddyn Hancock	5,279	13.8	+7.3
Conservative	Prudence Dailey	5,096	13.3	+0.4
Liberal Democrats	Eric Brooke	4,152	10.8	−2.6
UKIP	Susan Warry	603	1.6	N/A
ProLife Alliance	Joseph Biddulph	216	0.6	N/A
Majority		17,684	46.1	−4.3
Turnout		38,309	58.0	−13.4
Registered electors		71,768		
Labour hold		Swing	−5.6	

2005 general election: Pontypridd
Party	Candidate	Votes	%	±%
Labour	Kim Howells	20,919	52.8	−7.1
Liberal Democrats	Mike Powell	7,728	19.5	+8.7
Conservative	Quentin Edwards	5,321	13.4	+0.1
Plaid Cymru	Julie Richards	4,420	11.2	−2.6
UKIP	David Bevan	1,013	2.6	+1.0
Communist	Robert Griffiths	233	0.6	N/A
Majority		13,191	33.3	−12.8
Turnout		39,634	60.9	+2.9
Registered electors		64,310		
Labour hold		Swing	−7.9	

=== Elections in the 2010s ===
2010 general election: Pontypridd
Party	Candidate	Votes	%	±%
Labour	Owen Smith	14,220	38.8	−15.4
Liberal Democrats	Mike Powell	11,435	31.2	+11.2
Conservative	Lee Gonzalez	5,932	16.2	+4.6
Plaid Cymru	Ioan Bellin	2,673	7.3	−3.7
UKIP	David Bevan	1,229	3.4	+0.8
Socialist Labour	Simon Parsons	456	1.2	N/A
Christian	Donald Watson	365	1.0	N/A
Green	John Matthews	361	1.0	N/A
Majority		2,785	7.6	−25.7
Turnout		36,671	63.0	−0.2
Registered electors		58,205		
Labour hold		Swing	−13.3	

2015 general election: Pontypridd
Party	Candidate	Votes	%	±%
Labour	Owen Smith	15,554	41.1	+2.3
Conservative	Ann-Marie Mason	6,569	17.3	+1.1
UKIP	Andrew Tomkinson	5,085	13.4	+10.0
Liberal Democrats	Mike Powell	4,904	12.9	−18.3
Plaid Cymru	Osian Lewis	4,348	11.5	+4.2
Green	Katy Clay	992	2.6	+1.6
Socialist Labour	Damien Biggs	332	0.9	−0.3
TUSC	Esther Pearson	98	0.3	N/A
Rejected ballots		96		
Majority		8,985	23.8	+16.2
Turnout		37,882	64.3	+1.3
Registered electors		58,940		
Labour hold		Swing	−0.1	

Of the 96 rejected ballots:

- 70 were either unmarked or it was uncertain who the vote was for.
- 26 voted for more than one candidate.

2017 general election: Pontypridd
Party	Candidate	Votes	%	±%
Labour	Owen Smith	22,103	55.4	+14.3
Conservative	Juliette Ash	10,655	26.7	+9.4
Plaid Cymru	Fflur Elin	4,102	10.3	−1.2
Liberal Democrats	Mike Powell	1,963	4.9	−8.0
UKIP	Robin Hunter-Clarke	1,071	2.7	−10.7
Majority		11,448	28.7	+4.9
Turnout		39,894	65.9	+1.6
Registered electors		60,564		
Labour hold		Swing	+2.5	

2019 general election: Pontypridd
Party	Candidate	Votes	%	±%
Labour	Alex Davies-Jones	17,381	44.5	−10.9
Conservative	Sam Trask	11,494	29.4	+2.7
Plaid Cymru	Fflur Elin	4,990	12.8	+2.5
Brexit Party	Steve Bayliss	2,917	7.5	N/A
Independent	Mike Powell*	1,792	4.6	N/A
Independent	Sue Prior	337	0.9	N/A
Independent	Jonathan Bishop	149	0.4	N/A
Majority		5,890	15.1	−13.6
Turnout		39,060	64.7	−1.2
Registered electors		60,327		
Labour hold		Swing	−6.8	

*Powell originally nominated as a Liberal Democrat candidate, but resigned from the party in November 2019, prior to the election.

2019 notional result (Note: Estimate of the 2019 general election result as if the revised boundaries recommended under the 2023 boundary review were in place)
Party	Vote	%
Labour	21,254	46.6
Conservative	12,456	27.3
Plaid Cymru	4,963	10.9
Brexit Party	3,855	8.5
Independent candidates (4)	2,311	5.1
Liberal Democrats	639	1.4
Green Party	101	0.2
Majority	8,798	19.3
Turnout	45,579	61.8
Electorate	73,743	

=== Elections in the 2020s ===
2024 general election: Pontypridd
Party	Candidate	Votes	%	±%
Labour	Alex Davies-Jones	16,225	41.2	−5.4
Reform	Steven Wayne Bayliss	7,823	19.9	+11.4
Plaid Cymru	William Jac Rees	5,275	13.4	+2.5
Conservative	Jack Robson	3,775	9.6	−17.7
Independent	Wayne Owen	2,567	6.5	N/A
Green	Angela Karadog	1,865	4.7	+4.5
Liberal Democrats	David Mathias	1,606	4.1	+2.7
Independent	Joe Biddulph	198	0.5	N/A
Independent	Jonathan Bishop	44	0.1	−0.2
Majority		8,402	21.3	+2.0
Turnout		39,378	51.8	−10.0
Registered electors		75,951		
Labour hold		Swing	−8.4	

== See also ==
- Pontypridd (Senedd constituency)
- List of parliamentary constituencies in Mid Glamorgan
- List of parliamentary constituencies in Wales
- The National Library of Wales:Dictionary of Welsh Biography (Thomas Isaac Mardy Jones)
- The National Library for Wales: Dictionary of Welsh Biography (Arthur Pearson)
- The National Library for Wales: Dictionary of Welsh Biography (Brynmor John)
- Ordnance Survey Election Maps Site
- Boundary Commission Map report from 1917 showing original detailed map used for Pontypridd Constituency
- Boundary Commission Ordnance Survey Map original used at 1955 review for the entire UK showing all constituencies highly detailed

== Footnotes ==
- ^{a} In 1983, the Third Periodical Boundary Review report made major changes to the constituency, removing the areas of the former Cowbridge Borough and the former Cowbridge Rural District from the seat & placing them in the new Vale of Glamorgan seat with the exception of the Llanharry, Llanharan and Brynna communities which were transferred to the Ogmore seat. However, the Pentyrch & Creigiau communities were added to the new seat from the old Barry seat, to give a new seat with nearly 15,000 fewer electors.
- ^{b} This was and still is the largest number of electors for the Pontypridd constituency in any of its forms.
- ^{c} Arthur Pearson's initial selection following a closely contested process at a selection conference at Pontyclun occurred only after several rounds of voting, and he was finally chosen against the prominent local miners' agent W. H. May on 15 January 1938.
- ^{d} Enacted in the Representation of the People Act 1918 & created from the old East Glamorganshire (which included Pontypridd & the Tonteg/Church Village/Llantwit Fardre areas) & South Glamorganshire (which included the Llantrisant, Tonyrefail, Pontyclun, Llanharry & Cowbridge areas) parliamentary constituencies, the Pontypridd constituency from 1918 to the 1983 UK General Election remained unchanged & consisted of the Pontypridd urban district council area, the Llantrisant and Llantwit Fardre Rural District Council area, the Cowbridge municipal borough, and the Cowbridge Rural District Council area (which included the Llantwit Major, St Athan, Ystradowen, Llandow, Llanharry, Llanharan and Brynna communities).
