= Crawshays RFC =

Crawshays Welsh RFC
- Full name: Crawshays Welsh Rugby Football Club
- Founded: 1922; 104 years ago
- President: Richard Brice
Team kit

Official website
- www.crawshays.com

Crawshays Welsh RFC is a Welsh invitational rugby union team.

In 1922 Captain Geoffrey Crawshay was invited by the Engineer Commander of Devonport Services, SF Coopper, to bring a team of Welsh rugby union players to play Devonport Services R.F.C.

They are mainly a touring team who play fast, entertaining rugby. They are usually, a mix of seasoned internationals, and promising youngsters, with the occasional local player available at short notice. Many Wales rugby players have played for them, including J. P. R. Williams, Phil Bennett and Jonathan Davies.

From 1923 Crawshays Welsh Touring XV started to include Camborne RFC on their fixture list and this was to become a regular annual fixture for many years. In 1926-27 Camborne RFC achieved their first win over a Crawshay's side and the two sides played most recently in 2003 when Camborne celebrated their 125th anniversary season.

Crawshays Welsh XV have played all over the rugby playing world. There is also an under 19 team that travels extensively and it is not unusual to for them to field a team in the international sevens tournaments.

The Welsh Crawshays celebrated their centenary season during the 2021/22 campaign with a series of events, dinners and tours both to France and Cornwall respectively.

== Men's Fixtures/Results ==
=== 1920-1929 ===
| Season | Date | Score | W/L | Opposition | Attendance | Ref |
|---|---|---|---|---|---|---|
| 1921-1922 | Saturday, 22 Apr 1922 | 11-11 | D | Devonport Services | | |
| 1922-1923 | Saturday, 21 Apr 1923 | 14-5 | W | Devonport Services | | |
| 1922-1923 | Monday, 23 Apr 1923 | 20-13 | W | Camborne | | |
| 1923-1924 | Sunday, 20 Apr 1924 | 10-27 | L | Devonport Services | | |
| 1923-1924 | Tuesday, 22 Apr 1924 | 16-3 | W | Camborne | | |
| 1924-1925 | Saturday, 04 Apr 1925 | 6-6 | D | Devonport Services | | |
| 1924-1925 | Monday, 06 Apr 1925 | 12-3 | W | Camborne | | |
| 1924-1925 | Wednesday, 08 Apr 1925 | 25-7 | W | Torquay Athletic | | |
| 1925-1926 | Saturday, 17 Apr 1926 | 17-3 | W | Torquay Athletic | | |
| 1925-1926 | Monday, 19 Apr 1926 | 32-3 | W | Camborne | | |
| 1925-1926 | Wednesday, 21 Apr 1926 | 4-11 | L | Devonport Services | | |
| 1926-1927 | Saturday, 09 Apr 1927 | 11-20 | L | Torquay Athletic | | |
| 1926-1927 | Monday, 11 Apr 1927 | 5-11 | L | Camborne | | |
| 1926-1927 | Wednesday, 13 Apr 1927 | 31-13 | W | Devonport Services | | |
| 1926-1927 | Saturday, 30 Apr 1927 | 14-13 | W | Newport | | |
| 1927-1928 | Tuesday, 17 Apr 1928 | 15-10 | W | Devonport Services | | |
| 1927-1928 | Thursday, 19 Apr 1928 | 17-11 | W | Camborne | | |
| 1927-1928 | Saturday, 21 Apr 1928 | 10-14 | L | Torquay Athletic | | |
| 1928-1929 | Tuesday, 16 Apr 1929 | 8-8 | D | Devonport Services | | |
| 1928-1929 | Thursday, 18 Apr 1929 | 11-6 | W | Camborne | | |
| 1928-1929 | Saturday, 20 Apr 1929 | 5-8 | L | Torquay Athletic | | |
| 1928-1929 | Saturday, 27 Apr 1929 | 3-18 | L | Newport | | |
| 1929-1930 | Monday, 07 Apr 1930 | 19-8 | W | Camborne | | |
| 1929-1930 | Wednesday, 09 Apr 1930 | 14-6 | W | Devonport Services | | |
| 1929-1930 | Saturday, 12 Apr 1930 | 15-16 | L | Torquay Athletic | | |

=== 1930-1939 ===
| Season | Date | Score | W/L | Opposition | Attendance | Ref |
|---|---|---|---|---|---|---|
| 1930-1931 | Monday, 13 Apr 1931 | 24-11 | W | Devonport Services | | |
| 1930-1931 | Thursday, 16 Apr 1931 | 29-8 | W | Camborne | | |
| 1930-1931 | Saturday, 18 Apr 1931 | 3-7 | L | Torquay Athletic | | |
| 1931-1932 | Monday, 11 Apr 1932 | 11-3 | W | Torquay Athletic | | |
| 1931-1932 | Wednesday, 13 Apr 1932 | 9-3 | W | Devonport Services | | |
| 1931-1932 | Sunday, 17 Apr 1932 | 6-0 | W | Camborne | | |
| 1932-1933 | Monday, 03 Apr 1933 | 5-3 | W | Torquay Athletic | | |
| 1932-1933 | Thursday, 06 Apr 1933 | 12-0 | W | Devonport Services | | |
| 1932-1933 | Saturday, 08 Apr 1933 | 0-0 | D | Camborne | | |
| 1933-1934 | Monday, 16 Apr 1934 | 15-6 | W | Torquay Athletic | | |
| 1933-1934 | Wednesday, 18 Apr 1934 | 7-3 | W | Devonport Services | | |
| 1933-1934 | Saturday, 21 Apr 1934 | 8-0 | W | Camborne | | |
| 1934-1935 | Saturday, 06 Apr 1935 | 12-6 | W | Torquay Athletic | | |
| 1934-1935 | Monday, 08 Apr 1935 | 8-10 | L | Devonport Services | | |
| 1934-1935 | Thursday, 11 Apr 1935 | 16-8 | W | Camborne | | |
| 1935-1936 | Monday, 06 Apr 1936 | 3-0 | W | Devonport Services | | |
| 1935-1936 | Wednesday, 08 Apr 1936 | 14-3 | W | Camborne | | |
| 1936-1937 | Monday, 05 Apr 1937 | 15-8 | W | Devonport Services | | |
| 1936-1937 | Wednesday, 07 Apr 1937 | 15-3 | W | Camborne | | |
| 1937-1938 | Monday, 11 Apr 1938 | 16-6 | W | Devonport Services | | |
| 1937-1938 | Wednesday, 13 Apr 1938 | 23-2 | W | Camborne | | |
| 1938-1939 | Monday, 03 Apr 1939 | 29-0 | W | Devonport Services | | |
| 1938-1939 | Thursday, 06 Apr 1939 | 25-5 | W | Camborne | | |
| 1939-1940 | Second World War | | | | | |

=== 1940-1949 ===
| Season | Date | Score | W/L | Opposition | Attendance | Ref |
|---|---|---|---|---|---|---|
| 1940-1941 | Second World War | | | | | |
| 1941-1942 | Second World War | | | | | |
| 1942-1943 | Second World War | | | | | |
| 1943-1944 | Second World War | | | | | |
| 1943-1944 | Second World War | | | | | |
| 1944-1945 | Second World War | | | | | |
| 1945-1946 | No Record | | | | | |
| 1946-1947 | No Record | | | | | |
| 1947-1948 | No Record | | | | | |
| 1948-1949 | Thursday, 28 Apr 1949 | 0-6 | L | Cardiff XV | | |
| 1949-1950 | Monday, 03 Apr 1950 | 18-3 | W | Devonport Services | | |
| 1949-1950 | Wednesday, 05 Apr 1950 | 11-10 | W | Camborne | | |

=== 1950-1959 ===
| Season | Date | Score | W/L | Opposition | Attendance | Ref |
|---|---|---|---|---|---|---|
| 1950-1951 | Monday, 16 Apr 1951 | 19-0 | W | Devonport Services | | |
| 1950-1951 | Wednesday, 18 Apr 1951 | 17-3 | W | Camborne | | |
| 1951-1952 | Monday, 07 Apr 1952 | 3-3 | D | Devonport Services | | |
| 1951-1952 | Wednesday, 09 Apr 1952 | 17-3 | W | Camborne | | |
| 1952-1953 | Monday, 20 Apr 1953 | 9-6 | W | Devonport Services | | |
| 1952-1953 | Wednesday, 22 Apr 1953 | 6-6 | D | Camborne | | |
| 1953-1954 | No Record | | | | | |
| 1954-1955 | Monday, 13 Sep 1954 | 17-3 | W | Devonport Services | | |
| 1954-1955 | Wednesday, 15 Sep 1954 | 17-8 | W | Camborne | | |
| 1955-1956 | Monday, 12 Sep 1955 | 6-0 | W | Devonport Services | | |
| 1955-1956 | Wednesday, 14 Sep 1955 | 25-9 | W | Camborne | | |
| 1956-1957 | Monday, 17 Sep 1956 | 11-8 | W | Devonport Services | | |
| 1956-1957 | Wednesday, 19 Sep 1956 | 29-3 | W | Camborne | | |
| 1957-1958 | Monday, 16 Sep 1957 | 0-21 | L | Devonport Services | | |
| 1957-1958 | Wednesday, 18 Sep 1957 | 16-13 | W | Camborne | | |
| 1958-1959 | Monday, 15 Sep 1958 | 30-11 | W | Devonport Services | | |
| 1958-1959 | Wednesday, 17 Sep 1958 | 20-16 | W | Camborne | | |
| 1959-1960 | Monday, 14 Sep 1959 | 40-3 | W | Devonport Services | | |
| 1959-1960 | Wednesday, 16 Sep 1959 | 17-0 | W | Camborne | | |
| 1959-1960 | Wednesday, 01 Jun 1960 | 8-18 | L | London Welsh | | |

=== 1960-1969 ===
| Season | Date | Score | W/L | Opposition | Attendance | Ref |
|---|---|---|---|---|---|---|
| 1960-1961 | Monday, 12 Sep 1960 | 23-12 | W | Plymouth Albion and Devonport Services | | |
| 1960-1961 | Wednesday, 14 Sep 1960 | 33-5 | W | Camborne | | |
| 1961-1962 | Monday, 11 Sep 1961 | 25-0 | W | Plymouth Albion and Devonport Services | | |
| 1961-1962 | Wednesday, 13 Sep 1961 | 24-17 | W | Camborne | | |
| 1962-1963 | Monday, 17 Sep 1962 | 23-2 | W | Plymouth Albion and Devonport Services | | |
| 1962-1963 | Wednesday, 19 Sep 1962 | 37-3 | W | Camborne | | |
| 1962-1963 | Tuesday, 11 Dec 1962 | 8-3 | W | Ebbw Vale | | |
| 1963-1964 | Monday, 16 Sep 1963 | 11-9 | W | Plymouth Albion and Devonport Services | | |
| 1963-1964 | Wednesday, 18 Sep 1963 | 3-0 | W | Camborne | | |
| 1964-1965 | Monday, 14 Sep 1964 | 11-6 | W | Plymouth Albion and Devonport Services | | |
| 1964-1965 | Wednesday, 16 Sep 1964 | 36-0 | W | Camborne | | |
| 1965-1966 | Monday, 13 Sep 1965 | 47-14 | W | Plymouth | | |
| 1965-1966 | Wednesday, 15 Sep 1965 | 10-17 | L | Cornwall | | |
| 1966-1967 | Monday, 12 Sep 1966 | 14-3 | W | Plymouth | | |
| 1966-1967 | Wednesday, 14 Sep 1966 | 3-21 | L | Cornwall | | |
| 1967-1968 | Monday, 11 Sep 1967 | 11-3 | W | Plymouth | | |
| 1967-1968 | Wednesday, 13 Sep 1967 | 9-9 | D | Cornwall | | |
| 1968-1969 | Monday, 16 Sep 1968 | 29-18 | W | Plymouth | | |
| 1968-1969 | Wednesday, 18 Sep 1968 | 16-0 | W | Cornwall | | |
| 1969-1970 | Monday, 15 Sep 1969 | 19-6 | W | Plymouth | | |
| 1969-1970 | Wednesday, 17 Sep 1969 | 16-9 | W | Cornwall | | |

=== 1970-1979 ===
| Season | Date | Score | W/L | Opposition | Attendance | Ref |
|---|---|---|---|---|---|---|
| 1970-1971 | Monday, 14 Sep 1970 | 24-3 | W | Plymouth | | |
| 1970-1971 | Wednesday, 16 Sep 1970 | 17-0 | W | Cornwall | | |
| 1970-1971 | Saturday, 22 May 1971 | 16-15 | W | North Wales | | |
| 1971-1972 | Monday, 13 Sep 1971 | 45-21 | W | Plymouth | | |
| 1971-1972 | Wednesday, 15 Sep 1971 | 35-18 | W | Cornwall | | |
| 1972-1973 | Tuesday, 12 Sep 1972 | 45-3 | W | Plymouth | | |
| 1972-1973 | Thursday, 14 Sep 1972 | 40-3 | W | Cornwall | | |
| 1972-1973 | Wednesday, 11 Oct 1972 | 9-20 | L | Scarlets | | |
| 1973-1974 | Tuesday, 11 Sep 1973 | 6-6 | D | Plymouth | | |
| 1973-1974 | Thursday, 13 Sep 1973 | 19-10 | W | Cornwall | | |
| 1973-1974 | Thursday, 28 Mar 1974 | 17-21 | L | Pembroke | | |
| 1974-1975 | Tuesday, 10 Sep 1974 | 23-9 | W | Plymouth | | |
| 1974-1975 | Thursday, 12 Sep 1974 | 15-0 | W | Cornwall | | |
| 1974-1975 | Tuesday, 29 Oct 1974 | 7-20 | L | Newport | | |
| 1974-1975 | Wednesday, 19 Mar 1975 | 56-12 | W | Usk | | |
| 1974-1975 | Thursday, 10 Apr 1975 | 30-26 | W | Carmarthen Quins | | |
| 1975-1976 | Tuesday, 09 Sep 1975 | 50-23 | W | Plymouth | | |
| 1975-1976 | Thursday, 11 Sep 1975 | 7-19 | L | Cornwall | | |
| 1975-1976 | Monday, 10 Nov 1975 | 20-6 | W | Royal Regiment of Wales | | |
| 1975-1976 | Wednesday, 12 Nov 1975 | 37-10 | W | Combined Services | | |
| 1975-1976 | Thursday, 25 Mar 1976 | 32-27 | W | Abergavenny | | |
| 1975-1976 | Thursday, 01 Apr 1976 | 9-17 | L | Blaina | | |
| 1976-1977 | Tuesday, 07 Sep 1976 | 45-26 | W | Plymouth | | |
| 1976-1977 | Thursday, 09 Sep 1976 | 4-7 | L | Cornwall | | |
| 1976-1977 | Sunday, 10 Oct 1976 | 0-0 | D | Wolverhampton | | |
| 1976-1977 | Monday, 27 Dec 1976 | 16-40 | L | Cardiff | | |
| 1976-1977 | Tuesday, 29 Mar 1977 | 19-30 | L | Aberavon | | |
| 1976-1977 | Wednesday, 06 Apr 1977 | 3-7 | L | Combined Services | | |
| 1977-1978 | Thursday, 01 Sep 1977 | 8-9 | L | Scarlets | | |
| 1977-1978 | Tuesday, 06 Sep 1977 | 24-9 | W | Plymouth | | |
| 1977-1978 | Thursday, 08 Sep 1977 | 30-18 | W | Cornwall | | |
| 1977-1978 | Tuesday, 29 Nov 1977 | 19-30 | L | Aberavon | | |
| 1978-1979 | Monday, 11 Sep 1978 | 15-18 | L | Plymouth | | |
| 1978-1979 | Wednesday, 13 Sep 1978 | 12-19 | L | Cornwall | | |
| 1978-1979 | Saturday, 24 Mar 1979 | 26-9 | W | Ruthin | | |
| 1979-1980 | Tuesday, 10 Sep 2024 | 14-24 | L | Plymouth | | |
| 1979-1980 | Thursday, 12 Sep 2024 | 28-17 | W | Cornwall | | |

=== 1980-1981 ===
| Season | Date | Score | W/L | Opposition | Attendance | Ref |
|---|---|---|---|---|---|---|
| 1980-1981 | Saturday, 06 Sep 1980 | 36-12 | W | Ruthin | | |
| 1980-1981 | Monday, 08 Sep 1980 | 40-0 | W | Bangor | | |
| 1981-1982 | Monday, 07 Sep 1981 | 48-18 | W | Chester | | |
| 1981-1982 | Wednesday, 09 Sep 1981 | 29-3 | W | Wrexham | | |
| 1982-1983 | Sunday, 12 Sep 1982 | 25-12 | W | North Wales | | |
| 1983-1984 | Monday, 05 Sep 1983 | 18-9 | W | Cornwall | | |
| 1983-1984 | Saturday, 10 Sep 1983 | 32-30 | W | Football Club Oloronais | | |
| 1983-1984 | Tuesday, 13 Sep 1983 | 24-8 | W | Aire Sur l’Adour | | |
| 1983-1984 | Sunday, 06 May 1984 | 16-10 | W | Rugby club Hyères-Carqueiranne-La Crau | | |
| 1983-1984 | Tuesday, 08 May 1984 | 21-9 | W | Rugby Nice Côte d'Azur Université-Racing | | |
| 1984-1985 | Saturday, 01 Sep 1984 | 50-7 | W | Carmarthen Quins | | |
| 1984-1985 | Monday, 03 Sep 1984 | 0-0 | D | Pembroke | | |
| 1984-1985 | Tuesday, 01 Jan 1985 | 24-29 | L | Cardiff | | |
| 1984-1985 | Wednesday, 10 Apr 1985 | 14-3 | W | Taibach | | |
| 1984-1985 | Sunday, 05 May 1985 | 16-30 | L | L’Union Sportive Fumel Libos | | |
| 1984-1985 | Tuesday, 07 May 1985 | 28-36 | L | CA Brive-Correze | | |
| 1985-1986 | Monday, 09 Sep 2024 | 24-15 | W | Llandovery | | |
| 1985-1986 | Sunday, 15 Sep 2024 | 15-24 | L | Llandovery | | |
| 1986-1987 | Monday, 29 Sep 1986 | 19-9 | W | Cornwall | | |
| 1986-1987 | Thursday, 14 May 1987 | 21-20 | W | Montauban Tarn et Garonne | | |
| 1986-1987 | Saturday, 16 May 1987 | 18-45 | L | Racing Club Narbonne Mediterranee | | |
| 1987-1988 | Friday, 11 Sep 1987 | 50-6 | W | Ruthin | | |
| 1988-1989 | Saturday, 10 Sep 1988 | 35-16 | W | Northern | | |
| 1989-1990 | No Record | | | | | |

=== 1990-1999 ===
| Season | Date | Score | W/L | Opposition | Attendance | Ref |
|---|---|---|---|---|---|---|
| 1990-1991 | No Record | | | | | |
| 1991-1992 | Monday, 20 Apr 1992 | 18-37 | L | Cardiff Institute of Higher Education | | |
| 1991-1992 | Monday, 27 Apr 1992 | 25-13 | W | Llanharan | | |
| 1991-1992 | Saturday, 06 Jun 1992 | 28-31 | L | Languedoc-Roussillon XV | | |
| 1991-1992 | Monday, 08 Jun 1992 | 26-9 | W | Serignan College Old Boys | | |
| 1992-1993 | Monday, 14 Sep 1992 | 37-16 | W | Cornwall | | |
| 1992-1993 | Monday, 28 Sep 1992 | 21-23 | L | Hendy | | |
| 1992-1993 | Tuesday, 10 Nov 1992 | 19-17 | W | Cambridge University | | |
| 1992-1993 | Friday, 19 Feb 1993 | 66-3 | W | Hawick | | |
| 1992-1993 | Saturday, 06 Mar 1993 | 75-35 | W | Plymouth Albion | | |
| 1992-1993 | Monday, 19 Apr 1993 | 25-25 | D | Abertillery | | |
| 1993-1994 | Friday, 06 Aug 1993 | 32-29 | W | Tarn Selection | | |
| 1993-1994 | Sunday, 08 Aug 1993 | 24-13 | W | AS Beziers Herault | | |
| 1993-1994 | Thursday, 11 Nov 1993 | 25-18 | W | Cambridge University | | |
| 1993-1994 | Tuesday, 08 Mar 1994 | 5-15 | L | Dunvant | | |
| 1993-1994 | Friday, 18 Mar 1994 | 24-14 | W | Blackheath | | |
| 1993-1994 | Tuesday, 12 Apr 1994 | 74-12 | W | Laugharne | | |
| 1993-1994 | Friday, 20 May 1994 | 24-29 | L | Selection Du Pay De Savoie | | |
| 1993-1994 | Sunday, 22 May 1994 | 9-19 | L | Selection De L'Isere | | |
| 1994-1995 | Monday, 12 Sep 1994 | 6-12 | L | Cornwall | | |
| 1994-1995 | Tuesday, 20 Sep 1994 | 28-20 | W | Abercarn | | |
| 1994-1995 | Tuesday, 04 Oct 1994 | 8-13 | L | Cambridge University | | |
| 1994-1995 | Tuesday, 11 Oct 1994 | 26-39 | L | Oxford University | | |
| 1994-1995 | Friday, 25 Nov 1994 | 24-3 | W | Welsh Exiles | | |
| 1994-1995 | Tuesday, 27 Dec 1994 | 52-83 | L | Newbridge | | |
| 1994-1995 | Friday, 03 Mar 1995 | 80-3 | W | Edinburgh Academicals | | |
| 1994-1995 | Tuesday, 18 Apr 1995 | 39-17 | W | Chepstow | | |
| 1994-1995 | Friday, 19 May 1995 | 31-57 | L | Selection Aveyron | | |
| 1994-1995 | Sunday, 21 May 1995 | 29-28 | W | Selection Aveyron | | |
| 1995-1996 | Friday, 01 Sep 1995 | 39-40 | L | Cornwall | | |
| 1995-1996 | Wednesday, 06 Sep 1995 | 61-0 | W | Cwmtillery | | |
| 1995-1996 | Tuesday, 17 Oct 1995 | 5-59 | L | Cambridge University | | |
| 1995-1996 | Tuesday, 07 Nov 1995 | 21-19 | W | Whitland | | |
| 1995-1996 | Friday, 01 Mar 1996 | 64-22 | W | Limerick | | |
| 1995-1996 | Tuesday, 09 Apr 1996 | 36-31 | W | Newport HSOB | | |
| 1996-1997 | Saturday, 03 Aug 1996 | 7-20 | L | Racing Club Narbonne Mediterranee | | |
| 1996-1997 | Monday, 30 Sep 1996 | 59-40 | W | Mold | | |
| 1996-1997 | Friday, 17 Jan 1997 | 67-45 | W | | | |
| 1996-1997 | Monday, 10 Mar 1997 | 38-48 | L | Cardigan | | |
| 1996-1997 | Tuesday, 08 Apr 1997 | 49-24 | W | Machen | | |
| 1996-1997 | Tuesday, 22 Apr 1997 | 36-12 | W | Devonport Services | | |
| 1996-1997 | Tuesday, 06 May 1997 | 62-38 | W | Tumble | | |
| 1996-1997 | Saturday, 07 Jun 1997 | 26-53 | L | Football Club Sportif Rumilly | | |
| 1997-1998 | Monday, 15 Sep 1997 | 48-34 | W | Cornwall | | |
| 1997-1998 | Tuesday, 17 Feb 1998 | 30-43 | L | Cambridge University | | |
| 1997-1998 | Tuesday, 03 Mar 1998 | 52-19 | W | Kenfig Hill | | |
| 1997-1998 | Friday, 20 Mar 1998 | 22-26 | L | Leinster | | |
| 1997-1998 | Tuesday, 31 Mar 1998 | 48-35 | W | Mid District | | |
| 1997-1998 | Tuesday, 21 Apr 1998 | 22-12 | W | Tonmawr | | |
| 1997-1998 | Tuesday, 19 May 1998 | 50-3 | W | Welsh Counties | | |
| 1997-1998 | Thursday, 28 May 1998 | 21-49 | L | Racing Club Narbonne Mediterranee | | |
| 1997-1998 | Saturday, 30 May 1998 | 42-24 | W | Languedoc-Roussillon XV | | |
| 1998-1999 | Tuesday, 10 Nov 1998 | 53-33 | W | Senghenydd | | |
| 1998-1999 | Friday, 05 Feb 1999 | 12-18 | L | Scottish Districts | | |
| 1998-1999 | Tuesday, 16 Feb 1999 | 34-62 | L | Cambridge University | | |
| 1998-1999 | Saturday, 10 Apr 1999 | 26-34 | L | London Welsh | | |
| 1998-1999 | Friday, 07 May 1999 | 98-29 | W | Czech Republic A | | |
| 1998-1999 | Sunday, 09 May 1999 | 66-43 | W | Czech Republic | | |
| 1999-2000 | Wednesday, 16 Feb 2000 | 47-19 | W | Cambridge University | | |
| 1999-2000 | Saturday, 04 Mar 2000 | 32-21 | W | London Welsh | | |
| 1999-2000 | Friday, 31 Mar 2000 | 54-24 | W | Terenure College | | |
| 1999-2000 | Sunday, 30 Apr 2000 | 60-26 | W | Torquay Athletic | | |
| 1999-2000 | Saturday, 27 May 2000 | 94-10 | W | Usk | | |
| 1999-2000 | Friday, 02 Jun 2000 | 130-7 | W | Jelgavas Alni | | |
| 1999-2000 | Sunday, 04 Jun 2000 | 39-13 | W | Latvia | | |

=== 2000-2009 ===
| Season | Date | Score | W/L | Opposition | Attendance | Ref |
|---|---|---|---|---|---|---|
| 2000-2001 | Saturday, 01 Jul 2000 | 95-34 | W | Tenby United | | |
| 2000-2001 | Saturday, 17 Feb 2001 | 44-24 | W | London Welsh | | |
| 2000-2001 | Wednesday, 21 Feb 2001 | 27-8 | W | Cambridge University | | |
| 2000-2001 | Tuesday, 03 Apr 2001 | 59-24 | W | North Midlands | | |
| 2000-2001 | Saturday, 14 Apr 2001 | 68-10 | W | Lampeter Town | | |
| 2000-2001 | Thursday, 24 May 2001 | 109-5 | W | RC L'Hospitalet | | |
| 2000-2001 | Sunday, 27 May 2001 | 29-12 | W | Catalonia | | |
| 2001-2002 | Friday, 16 Nov 2001 | 18-46 | L | Cambridge University | | |
| 2001-2002 | Friday, 25 Jan 2002 | 14-45 | L | Bridgend Ravens | | |
| 2001-2002 | Saturday, 23 Mar 2002 | 69-12 | W | London Welsh | | |
| 2001-2002 | Tuesday, 02 Apr 2002 | 93-26 | W | Cardigan | | |
| 2001-2002 | Tuesday, 09 Apr 2002 | 99-3 | W | Llandaff | | |
| 2001-2002 | Wednesday, 22 May 2002 | 66-3 | W | SS Lazio Rugby 1927 | | |
| 2001-2002 | Saturday, 25 May 2002 | 24-20 | W | Centro Universitario Sportivo Roma | | |
| 2002-2003 | Friday, 22 Nov 2002 | 47-35 | W | Maesteg | | |
| 2002-2003 | Wednesday, 12 Feb 2003 | 22-17 | W | Cambridge University | | |
| 2002-2003 | Monday, 07 Apr 2003 | 72-10 | W | Camborne | | |
| 2002-2003 | Thursday, 05 Jun 2003 | 55-29 | W | Poland | | |
| 2002-2003 | Sunday, 08 Jun 2003 | 29-22 | W | Blachy Pruszynski Budowlani Lodz | | |
| 2003-2004 | Wednesday, 25 Feb 2004 | 28-45 | L | Cambridge University | | |
| 2003-2004 | Tuesday, 06 Apr 2004 | 72-5 | W | Cardiff HSOB | | |
| 2003-2004 | Thursday, 20 May 2004 | 102-35 | W | Croatia | | |
| 2003-2004 | Saturday, 22 May 2004 | 91-27 | W | Slovenia | | |
| 2004-2005 | Wednesday, 09 Feb 2005 | 52-12 | W | Cambridge University | | |
| 2004-2005 | Saturday, 12 Feb 2005 | 46-19 | W | Devonport Services | | |
| 2004-2005 | Tuesday, 29 Mar 2005 | 99-21 | W | Fishguard and Goodwick | | |
| 2004-2005 | Thursday, 09 Jun 2005 | 38-33 | W | US Cote Vermeille XV | | |
| 2004-2005 | Saturday, 11 Jun 2005 | 31-19 | W | St Jean de Luz | | |
| 2005-2006 | Wednesday, 08 Feb 2006 | 80-0 | W | Cambridge University | | |
| 2005-2006 | Saturday, 25 Feb 2006 | 19-17 | W | Leinster | | |
| 2005-2006 | Tuesday, 18 Apr 2006 | 46-12 | W | Cwmbran | | |
| 2005-2006 | Thursday, 08 Jun 2006 | 27-26 | W | Basque Selection | | |
| 2005-2006 | Saturday, 10 Jun 2006 | 24-14 | W | Basque Selection | | |
| 2006-2007 | Friday, 09 Feb 2007 | 17-14 | W | Edinburgh Rugby | | |
| 2006-2007 | Sunday, 22 Apr 2007 | 29-18 | W | Tredegar | | |
| 2006-2007 | Sunday, 22 Apr 2007 | 64-10 | W | Bridgnorth | | |
| 2006-2007 | Sunday, 29 Apr 2007 | 54-21 | W | Hertfordshire | | |
| 2006-2007 | Thursday, 24 May 2007 | 26-5 | W | CS Politehnica-Agro Unirea Iasi | | |
| 2006-2007 | Saturday, 26 May 2007 | 22-18 | W | Romania XV | | |
| 2007-2008 | Wednesday, 14 Nov 2007 | 24-26 | L | Cambridge University | | |
| 2007-2008 | Friday, 22 Feb 2008 | 50-10 | W | British Army RU | | |
| 2007-2008 | Friday, 07 Mar 2008 | 31-27 | W | Leinster | | |
| 2007-2008 | Sunday, 27 Apr 2008 | 45-19 | W | Hertfordshire | | |
| 2007-2008 | Wednesday, 30 Apr 2008 | 39-0 | W | Dinas Powys | | |
| 2007-2008 | Thursday, 22 May 2008 | 61-24 | W | CF Belenenses | | |
| 2007-2008 | Sunday, 25 May 2008 | 81-0 | W | Portugal | | |
| 2008-2009 | Wednesday, 05 Nov 2008 | 31-22 | W | Cambridge University | | |
| 2008-2009 | Wednesday, 12 Nov 2008 | 60-38 | W | Old Monmouthshire XV | | |
| 2008-2009 | Saturday, 07 Feb 2009 | 36-14 | W | Edinburgh Rugby | | |
| 2008-2009 | Friday, 13 Mar 2009 | 71-29 | W | Newbridge | | |
| 2008-2009 | Tuesday, 12 May 2009 | 14-49 | L | Mid District Rhondda XV | | |
| 2008-2009 | Thursday, 04 Jun 2009 | 36-20 | W | Rugby Olympique de Grasse | | |
| 2008-2009 | Saturday, 06 Jun 2009 | 33-7 | W | Provence-Cote D'Azur | | |
| 2009-2010 | Wednesday, 04 Nov 2009 | 19-19 | D | Cambridge University | | |
| 2009-2010 | Sunday, 16 May 2010 | 21-40 | L | Hartpury College | | |
| 2009-2010 | Friday, 21 May 2010 | 52-21 | W | Welsh Army | | |
| 2009-2010 | Wednesday, 02 Jun 2010 | 66-7 | W | Hong Kong | | |
| 2009-2010 | Friday, 04 Jun 2010 | 59-17 | W | Hong Kong | | |

=== 2010-2019 ===
| Season | Date | Score | W/L | Opposition | Attendance | Ref |
|---|---|---|---|---|---|---|
| 2010-2011 | Wednesday, 03 Nov 2010 | 34-41 | L | Cambridge University | | |
| 2010-2011 | Wednesday, 23 Feb 2011 | 12-26 | L | Oxford University | | |
| 2010-2011 | Tuesday, 10 May 2011 | 35-31 | W | Llangennech | | |
| 2010-2011 | Saturday, 14 May 2011 | 24-23 | W | University of Wales Institute Cardiff | | |
| 2010-2011 | Tuesday, 24 May 2011 | 64-13 | W | Old Blues | | |
| 2010-2011 | Thursday, 26 May 2011 | 77-36 | W | New York Metropolitan | | |
| 2011-2012 | Wednesday, 07 Sep 2011 | 0-31 | L | British Army RU | | |
| 2011-2012 | Wednesday, 02 Nov 2011 | 24-14 | W | Cambridge University | | |
| 2011-2012 | Wednesday, 22 Feb 2012 | 19-41 | L | Oxford University | | |
| 2011-2012 | Thursday, 07 Jun 2012 | 61-12 | W | Capbreton Hossegor Rugby | | |
| 2011-2012 | Saturday, 09 Jun 2012 | 31-12 | W | US Dax Rugby Landes | | |
| 2012-2013 | Wednesday, 31 Oct 2012 | 21-24 | L | Cambridge University | | |
| 2012-2013 | Wednesday, 07 Nov 2012 | 31-29 | W | Combined Services | | |
| 2012-2013 | Wednesday, 20 Feb 2013 | 17-26 | L | Oxford University | | |
| 2012-2013 | Friday, 31 May 2013 | 8-0 | W | Bizkaia Gernika Rugby Taldea | | |
| 2012-2013 | Sunday, 02 Jun 2013 | 71-21 | W | Federación de Rugby de Castilla y León | | |
| 2013-2014 | Wednesday, 30 Oct 2013 | 18-18 | D | Cambridge University | | |
| 2013-2014 | Sunday, 04 May 2014 | 66-45 | W | Lampeter Town | | |
| 2013-2014 | Thursday, 29 May 2014 | 86-0 | W | Czech Republic A | | |
| 2013-2014 | Saturday, 31 May 2014 | 59-12 | W | Czech Republic | | |
| 2014-2015 | Wednesday, 05 Nov 2014 | 47-0 | W | Cambridge University | | |
| 2014-2015 | Wednesday, 25 Feb 2015 | 22-15 | W | Oxford University | | |
| 2014-2015 | Tuesday, 05 May 2015 | 59-19 | W | Whitland | | |
| 2014-2015 | Wednesday, 03 Jun 2015 | 24-17 | W | Georgia U21 | | |
| 2014-2015 | Saturday, 06 Jun 2015 | 14-7 | W | Georgia U21 | | |
| 2015-2016 | Wednesday, 18 Nov 2015 | 19-20 | L | Cambridge University | | |
| 2015-2016 | Wednesday, 03 Feb 2016 | 28-10 | W | Oxford University | | |
| 2015-2016 | Friday, 20 May 2016 | 47-32 | W | Bedwas | | |
| 2015-2016 | Wednesday, 01 Jun 2016 | 16-27 | L | Romania A | | |
| 2015-2016 | Saturday, 04 Jun 2016 | 7-14 | L | Romania A | | |
| 2016-2017 | Wednesday, 02 Nov 2016 | 19-30 | L | Cambridge University | | |
| 2016-2017 | Wednesday, 15 Feb 2017 | 14-12 | W | Oxford University | | |
| 2016-2017 | Wednesday, 17 May 2017 | 36-0 | W | Abertillery | | |
| 2016-2017 | Wednesday, 31 May 2017 | 24-41 | L | | | |
| 2016-2017 | Saturday, 03 Jun 2017 | 45-24 | W | Portugal U19 | | |
| 2017-2018 | Wednesday, 08 Nov 2017 | 29-12 | W | Cambridge University | | |
| 2017-2018 | Wednesday, 14 Feb 2018 | 29-14 | W | Oxford University | | |
| 2017-2018 | Saturday, 19 May 2018 | 45-28 | W | Burry Port | | |
| 2017-2018 | Wednesday, 30 May 2018 | 33-27 | W | Netherlands A | | |
| 2017-2018 | Saturday, 02 Jun 2018 | 40-28 | W | Netherlands | | |
| 2018-2019 | Friday, 02 Nov 2018 | 26-35 | L | Hong Kong | | |
| 2018-2019 | Wednesday, 14 Nov 2018 | 28-29 | L | Cambridge University | | |
| 2018-2019 | Wednesday, 13 Feb 2019 | 7-12 | L | Oxford University | | |
| 2019-2020 | Saturday, 31 Aug 2019 | 67-64 | W | Dolly's XV | | |
| 2019-2020 | Wednesday, 06 Nov 2019 | 22-23 | L | Cambridge University | | |
| 2019-2020 | Wednesday, 29 Jan 2020 | 19-24 | W | Oxford University | | |

=== 2020-2029 ===
| Season | Date | Score | W/L | Opposition | Attendance | Ref |
|---|---|---|---|---|---|---|
| 2020-2021 | COVID-19 | | | | | |
| 2021-2022 | Wednesday, 27 Oct 2021 | 66-13 | W | Vardre RFC | | |
| 2021-2022 | Wednesday, 24 Nov 2021 | 22-14 | L | Oxford University | | |
| 2021-2022 | Wednesday, 02 Mar 2022 | 17-14 | L | Cambridge University | | |
| 2021-2022 | Saturday, 30 Apr 2022 | 24-31 | W | Cornwall | | |
| 2021-2022 | Wednesday, 11 May 2022 | 68-14 | W | Machen | | |
| 2021-2022 | Saturday, 04 Jun 2022 | 17-69 | W | FFR Regional Select (L’Occitaine) | | |
| 2021-2022 | Sunday, 05 Jun 2022 | 69-17 | W | Bezier Select XV | | |
| 2022-2023 | Wednesday, 23 Nov 2022 | 33-12 | L | Oxford University | | |
| 2022-2023 | Wednesday, 15 Mar 2023 | | L | Cambridge University | | |
| 2022-2023 | Saturday, 13 May 2023 | 27-33 | W | Newport HSOB | | |
| 2023-2024 | Wednesday, 01 Nov 2023 | 21-26 | L | Oxford University | | |
| 2023-2024 | Friday, 23 Feb 2024 | 10-61 | L | Ulster Rugby Development XV | | |
| 2024-2025 | Friday, 08 Nov 2024 | 26-28 | L | Oxford University | | |
| 2024-2025 | Wednesday, 20 Nov 2024 | 22-32 | L | Cambridge University | | |
| 2024-2025 | Friday, 07 Mar 2025 | 40-21 | L | Currie Chieftains | | |
| 2024-2025 | Friday, 25 Apr 2025 | 55-19 | L | Newport RFC | | |
| 2024-2025 | Friday, 16 May 2025 | 29-39 | W | Carmarthen Quins | | |
| 2025-2026 | Wednesday, 12 Nov 2025 | 21-28 | W | Cambridge University | | |
| 2025-2026 | Friday, 28 Nov 2025 | 29-19 | W | Oxford University | | |
| 2025-2026 | Saturday, 2 Feb 2026 | 27-19 | L | Cornwall | | |
| 2025-2026 | Friday, 27 Mar 2026 | | | Felinfoel RFC | | |
| 2025-2026 | Friday, 24 Apr 2026 | | | Blaina RFC | | |
| 2025-2026 | Saturday, 9 May 2026 | | | Mountain Ash RFC | | |

== Links ==
Main Links

- Crawshays.com Official website
- VX3 Online Shop

Social Media

- Instagram
- X (formerly known as Twitter)
- Linkedin
- Facebook Group
