= David Lewis Davies =

British politician (1873–1937)

David Lewis Davies (1873 – 25 November 1937) was a British Labour Party politician. He was the Member of Parliament (MP) for Pontypridd from 1931 to 1937.

He first stood for Parliament at the 1918 general election, when Pontypridd was won by the Coalition Liberal candidate Thomas Lewis. Lewis was forced to seek re-election in July 1922 when he was appointed as a Lord Commissioner of the Treasury (a nominal post held by a government whip), and the by-election was won by a new Labour candidate, Thomas Jones.

Jones held the seat for nine years until he resigned from the House of Commons on 4 February 1931. Davies was the Labour candidate in the resulting by-election, which he won 60% of the votes. He held the seat for a further seven years, until his death in November 1937, aged 64.

Parliament of the United Kingdom
Preceded by Thomas Mardy Jones	Member of Parliament for Pontypridd; 1931 – 1938	Succeeded by Arthur Pearson
Trade union offices
Preceded by Ben Davies	Agent of the Pontypridd District of the South Wales Miners' Federation; 1920–1931	Succeeded by W. H. May
