= 1938 Pontypridd by-election =

UK Parliamentary by-election

The 1938 Pontypridd by-election was held on 11 February 1938. The by-election was held due to the death of the incumbent Labour MP, David Lewis Davies. It was won by the Labour candidate Arthur Pearson.

1938 Pontypridd by-election
| Party | Candidate | Votes | % | ±% |
|---|---|---|---|---|
| Labour | Arthur Pearson | 22,159 | 59.9 | N/A |
| Liberal National | Juliet Rhys-Williams | 14,810 | 40.1 | N/A |
| Majority | | 7,349 | 19.8 | N/A |
| Turnout | | 36,969 | 69.3 | N/A |
| Registered electors | | 36,846 | | |
| Labour hold | | Swing | N/A | |
