= 1989 Pontypridd by-election =

UK parliamentary by-election

- 23 February 1989

Constituency of Pontypridd
- Turnout: 62.0% (▼19.3%)
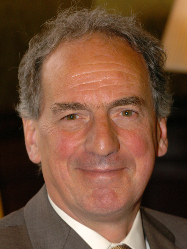

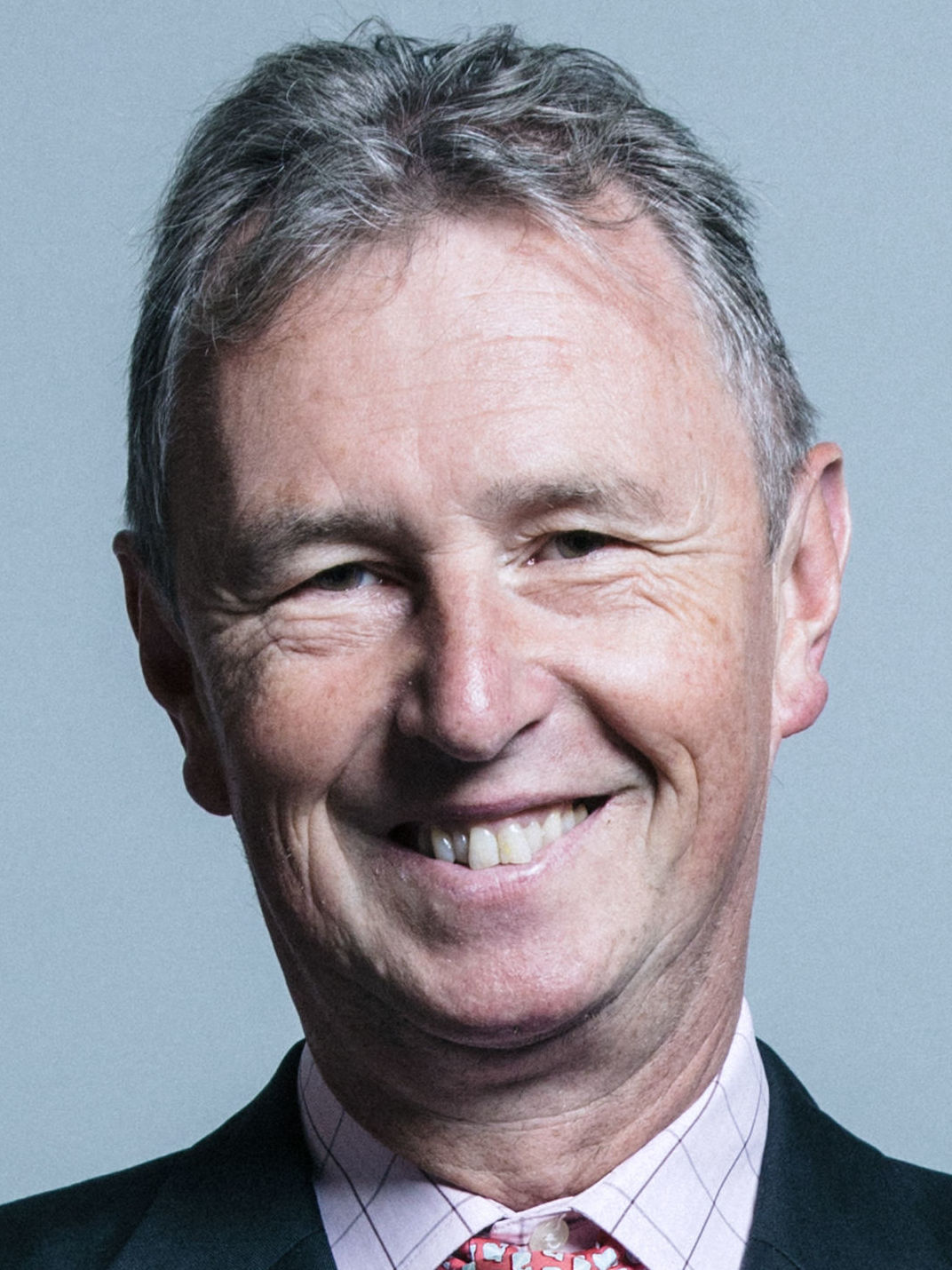
	First party	Second party	Third party
		PC
Candidate	Kim Howells	Syd Morgan	Nigel Evans
Party	Labour	Plaid Cymru	Conservative
Popular vote	20,549	9,775	5,212
Percentage	53.4%	25.3%	13.5%
Swing	▼2.9%	▲20.0%	▼6.0%
MP before election
Brynmor John
Labour
Subsequent MP
Kim Howells
Labour

The 1989 Pontypridd by-election was a by-election held in Wales on 23 February 1989 for the UK House of Commons constituency of Pontypridd in Mid Glamorgan.

The by-election was caused by the death of the constituency's Labour Party Member of Parliament (MP) Brynmor John on 13 December 1988.

The result was a Labour Party hold, with Dr Kim Howells winning a majority of almost 11,000 votes.

Whilst out canvassing for the Conservative party, neighbouring MP Sir Raymond Gower died, which resulted in the Vale of Glamorgan by-election.

== Result ==
1989 Pontypridd by-election
Party	Candidate	Votes	%	±%
Labour	Kim Howells	20,549	53.4	−2.9
Plaid Cymru	Syd Morgan	9,775	25.3	+20.0
Conservative	Nigel Evans	5,212	13.5	−6.0
SLD	Tom Ellis	1,500	3.9	−15.0
SDP	Terry Thomas	1,199	3.1	N/A
Communist	David Richards	239	0.6	N/A
Independent	David Black	57	0.1	N/A
Majority		10,794	28.1	−8.7
Turnout		38,511	62.0	−14.6
Registered electors		61,193		
Labour hold		Swing	−11.5	

== See also ==
- List of United Kingdom by-elections
- Pontypridd constituency
