= Brynmor John =

British politician (1934–1988)

Shadow Secretary of State for Defence
- In office 8 December 1980 – 24 November 1981
- Leader: Michael Foot
- Preceded by: William Rodgers
- Succeeded by: John Silkin

Member of Parliament for Pontypridd
- In office 18 June 1970 – 13 December 1988
- Preceded by: Arthur Pearson
- Succeeded by: Kim Howells

Personal details
- Born: 18 April 1934
- Died: 13 December 1988 (aged 54) London, England
- Party: Labour
- Education: University College London

Brynmor Thomas John (18 April 1934 – 13 December 1988) was a British Labour politician.

John was Member of Parliament for Pontypridd in South Wales from 1970 until his death. During the Labour government of 1974 to 1979, he was a junior Defence minister for the Royal Air Force (RAF) (1974–1976), a Home Office minister (1976–1979) and Shadow Secretary of State for Defence (1980–1981).

The circumstances of his later life and premature death are cited by physicians who believe the extensive evidence for the biological etiology of chronic fatigue syndrome. Brynmor John had been diagnosed with the illness, and died suddenly immediately after exiting the House of Commons gym. He had been following an exercise regime based on what is argued to be unfounded and unethical medical advice: that sufferers may exercise their way toward a cure for the illness.

== Sources ==
- Times Guide to the House of Commons, 1987 and 1992 editions.

Parliament of the United Kingdom
Preceded by Arthur Pearson	Member of Parliament for Pontypridd; 1970–1988	Succeeded by Kim Howells
Political offices
Preceded by William Rodgers	Shadow Secretary of State for Defence; 1980–1981	Succeeded by John Silkin
