= Kim Howells =

Welsh Labour Party politician (born 1946)

The Right Honourable Kim Howells
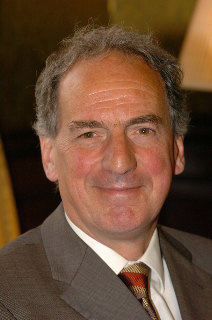
- Official portrait, 2007

Chairman of the Intelligence and Security Committee
- In office 3 October 2008 – 11 May 2010
- Preceded by: Margaret Beckett
- Succeeded by: Malcolm Rifkind

Minister of State for Foreign and Commonwealth Affairs
- In office 11 May 2005 – 6 October 2008
- Prime Minister: Tony Blair; Gordon Brown
- Preceded by: The Baroness Symons
- Succeeded by: Bill Rammell

Minister of State for Higher Education
- In office 10 September 2004 – 11 May 2005
- Prime Minister: Tony Blair
- Preceded by: Alan Johnson
- Succeeded by: Bill Rammell

Minister of State for Transport
- In office 13 June 2003 – 10 September 2004
- Prime Minister: Tony Blair
- Preceded by: John Spellar
- Succeeded by: Tony McNulty

Parliamentary Under-Secretary of State for Culture, Media and Sport
- In office 11 June 2001 – 13 June 2003
- Prime Minister: Tony Blair
- Preceded by: Janet Anderson
- Succeeded by: Andrew McIntosh

Parliamentary Under-Secretary of State for Trade and Industry
- In office 28 July 1998 – 11 June 2001
- Prime Minister: Tony Blair
- Preceded by: Nigel Griffiths
- Succeeded by: Nigel Griffiths

Member of Parliament for Pontypridd
- In office 23 February 1989 – 12 April 2010
- Preceded by: Brynmor John
- Succeeded by: Owen Smith

Personal details
- Born: 27 November 1946 (age 79) Merthyr Tydfil, Wales
- Party: Labour
- Spouse: Eirlys Davies
- Education: Middlesex University; University of Warwick; Anglia Ruskin University
- Occupation: Politician

Kim Scott Howells (born 27 November 1946) is a Welsh Labour Party former politician. He was the Member of Parliament (MP) for Pontypridd from 1989 to 2010, and held a number of ministerial positions within the Blair and Brown governments.

== Biography ==
Howells is the son of Glanville Howells, a Communist lorry driver, and of Joan Glenys Howells. Born in Merthyr Tydfil, Wales and raised in Penywaun near Aberdare in the Cynon Valley, he is a former pupil of Mountain Ash Grammar School.

Howells went to Hornsey College of Art where he was active in the May 1968 student occupation, and was the first protester to breach the Metropolitan Police cordon at the demonstration against the Vietnam War outside the US Embassy in Grosvenor Square in 1968.

Howells featured as a student leader at Hornsey College of Art in director John Goldschmidt's film Our Live Experiment is worth more than 3,000 Textbooks, made for Granada Television and shown on the ITV network.

He attended the Cambridgeshire College of Arts and Technology between 1971 and 1974 where he studied for a Joint Honours Degree and was awarded an upper second, which allowed him to follow post-graduate studies in history. Howells later obtained a PhD from the University of Warwick in 1979 for a thesis entitled A view from below: tradition, experience and nationalism in the South Wales coalfield, 1937–1957.

=== Professional career ===
On returning home to South Wales from college, Howells worked as a researcher and editor for the South Wales Miner, before becoming a South Wales National Union of Mineworkers official and local representative of the Communist Party of Great Britain. He joined the Labour Party in 1982.

Howells ran the NUM Pontypridd office which co-ordinated the South Wales miners' efforts during the UK miners' strike. A serious incident during the national dispute occurred in his area at the end of November 1984, when taxi driver David Wilkie was killed when two striking miners dropped a concrete block off a local bridge onto Wilkie's taxi, which was taking a strike-breaking miner to work. On being told of the incident in a telephone call from a reporter of the South Wales Echo, Howells rode his bicycle to the NUM offices.

After allegations that he hid evidence associated with the death of Wilkie, and an investigation by South Wales Police, Howells in 2004 commented in a BBC Wales documentary that when he heard the news, he thought "hang on, we've got all those records we've kept over in the NUM offices, there's all those maps on the wall, we're gonna get implicated in this". He then destroyed a large number of papers because he feared a police raid on the union offices. He has commented that the attack by the strikers was a result of pressure to get the miners to return to work.

Following the miners' strike and the closure of 29 of the 30 National Coal Board pits in South Wales, Howells became a writer and presenter for television and radio, and a college lecturer.

=== Parliamentary career ===
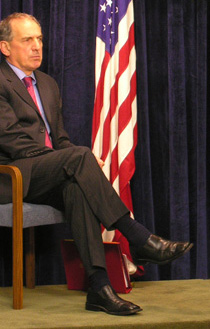
Howells as a Foreign Office Minister in 2007

Howells entered the House of Commons in a by-election in 1989. As a member of the Labour Opposition, he became successively an Opposition Spokesman on Trade and Industry, on Home Affairs, on Foreign Affairs and on Development and Co-operation. Howells suggested in 1996 that the word "socialism" ought to be "humanely phased out" of Labour Party policy documents. In 1995, Clause IV of the party's constitution was revised to state that "The Labour Party is a democratic socialist party".

He held a string of junior ministerial posts in various departments following the 1997 election until October 2008. From May 1997 to January 1998, he served as a Parliamentary Under-Secretary of State at the Department for Education and Employment. He then served in the Department for Trade and Industry until June 2001, and then as a junior minister with the trade and broadcasting brief at the Department for Culture, Media and Sport until June 2003. He served as a Minister of State from June 2003 to September 2004, when he became Minister for Higher Education. He left that post when he was made Minister for the Middle East in the Foreign and Commonwealth Office in May 2005. He remained a Minister of State at the Foreign Office after Gordon Brown became Prime Minister, but returned to the backbenches when Brown conducted a reshuffle in October 2008.

After leaving the government Howells was appointed to take over from Margaret Beckett as chair of the Intelligence and Security Committee, a committee of parliamentarians that oversees the work of Britain's intelligence and security agencies.

In 2003, he said the Labour government was trying to run capitalism more "efficiently" and "humanely". He is a member, and the former chairman, of Labour Friends of Israel.

In February 2009, Howells was appointed to the Privy Council, making him The Right Honourable Kim Howells, an appointment that coincided with the 20th anniversary of his election to Parliament.

In March 2009, it was revealed that Howells made one of the lowest expense claims among Welsh MPs, being 5th from bottom.

On 18 December 2009, Howells announced that he would stand down at the 2010 general election.

On 15 July 2011, Howells received an Honorary Doctorate for his contribution to Welsh and British politics from the University of Glamorgan. Following comments made by Howells concerning the financial reasons for recruiting students from overseas and, particularly, the perceived security risk appertaining to students from Libya, international students organised to demonstrate at the event. Howells withdrew from the ceremony at the last minute after pressure mounted on him. The NUS Wales Black Students' Campaign described Dr Howells' comments as "reckless" and said that the comments "could add to the barriers facing Black and Minority Ethnic students in Wales".

=== Parliamentary challenges ===
In February 2006, he was the subject of a complaint from Paul Flynn MP after he mocked Mr Flynn's attitude towards the UK's Afghan drug policy:

It is not enough to assume that if people eat the right kind of muesli, go to first nights of Harold Pinter revivals and read The Independent occasionally, the drug barons of Afghanistan will go away. They will not.

On 22 November 2006, it was announced that on a recent visit to Iraq his helicopter was involved in an incident as it left the city of Basra with witnesses claiming shots were fired at the aircraft.

=== Ministerial career ===
Howells served in various ministerial capacities. Notable legislation he introduced included the Licensing Act 2003 and the Communications Act 2003.

=== Personality ===
Howells is known to be outspoken. He told The Scotsman newspaper in September 1995 that devolution was akin to fascism and that it would lead to the "Balkanisation of Great Britain".

In 2002, as a junior Minister at the Department for Culture, Media and Sport, he criticised the Turner Prize by writing a note that read:

If this is the best British artists can produce then British art is lost. It is cold, mechanical, conceptual bullshit. Kim Howells. P.S. The attempts at contextualisation are particularly pathetic and symptomatic of a lack of conviction.

Throughout his Parliamentary career he was unafraid to speak his mind and often sparked strong criticism from those he criticised or offended. During a House of Commons debate on licensing laws he said that the idea of "listening to three Somerset folk singers sounds like hell".

On the Today programme, while visiting Iraq on 11 March 2006 as Foreign Office minister, he commented in an interview:

[Iraq] is a mess that can't launch an attack now on Iran; a mess that won't be able to march into Kuwait; it's a mess that can't develop nuclear weapons. So yes it's a mess but it's starting to look like the sort of mess that most of us live in.

On 22 July 2006, Howell criticised Israel's bombardment of Lebanon while on a visit to Beirut, breaking with the Prime Minister and Foreign Secretary's less critical line, saying:

The destruction of the infrastructure, the death of so many children and so many people. These have not been surgical strikes. And it's very difficult, I think, to understand the kind of military tactics that have been used. You know, if they're chasing Hezbollah, then go for Hezbollah. You don't go for the entire Lebanese nation.

He once described the British royal family as "a bit bonkers".

Howells said in 2013 that Labour had to change its relationship with the unions or face damaging its reputation and risk losing the next general election.

=== Personal life ===
Howells married Eirlys Davies in 1983. He has two sons and one stepdaughter.

Parliament of the United Kingdom
Preceded by Brynmor John	Member of Parliament for Pontypridd; 1989 – 2010	Succeeded by Owen Smith
Political offices
Preceded by Margaret Beckett	Chair of the Intelligence and Security Committee; 2008–2010	Succeeded by Malcolm Rifkind
