= Arthur Pearson (British politician) =

British politician

Arthur Pearson CBE (31 January 1897 – 14 October 1980) was a Labour Party politician in the United Kingdom. Pearson was one of eight children of William and Margaret (Lewis) Pearson, natives of Saltney, Flintshire.

Pearson worked as a chainworker at the Brown, Lennox and Co. at Pontypridd, where his father had also worked, from 1913 until 1938. In 1920, he was elected treasurer of the local branch of the Chainworkers Association, and in 1934 was runner-up in the ballot for the position of national secretary of the association. During the First World War, he served with the Welsh Guards from 1916 until 1919. In 1924 he was elected secretary of the Pontypridd UDC Labour group even before his election as a member of the council.

Pearson was a member of the Pontypridd Urban District Council from 1926 until 1938, representing the Trallwn ward. He served as chairman in 1937–38. In 1928 he was elected as a member of Glamorgan County Council for the Cilfynydd ward, defeating long-serving Liberal Alderman William Roberts Davies, who had been a member since 1898. He remained a member until 1945. In 1933-34 he was chairman of the Pontypridd Education Committee, and he became a JP in 1939.

Following the death of the Member of Parliament (MP) for Pontypridd, David Lewis Davies in 1937, Pearson was selected as the new Labour candidate, narrowly defeating local miners' agent W.H. May at a selection meeting at Pontyclun on 15 January 1938. Following his victory at the 1938 by-election, and served until his retirement at the 1970 general election. He was a government whip as Comptroller of the Household from 1945 to 1946, and Treasurer of the Household from 1946 until 1951. He was appointed CBE in 1949.

Arthur Pearson was unmarried.

== Sources ==
=== Online ===
- Jones, John Graham. "Arthur Pearson (1897-1980)". Dictionary of Welsh Biography. National Library of Wales.

Political offices
Preceded by Leslie Pym	Comptroller of the Household; 1945–1946	Succeeded by Michael Stewart
Preceded by George Mathers	Treasurer of the Household; 1946–1951	Succeeded by Cedric Drewe
Parliament of the United Kingdom
Preceded by David Lewis Davies	Member of Parliament for Pontypridd; 1938 – 1970	Succeeded by Brynmor John
