= 1922 Pontypridd by-election =

UK Parliamentary by-election

- 25 July 1922

| Candidate | Thomas Mardy Jones | Thomas Arthur Lewis |
| Party | Labour | National Liberal |
| Popular vote | 16,630 | 12,550 |
| Percentage | 57.0% | 43.0% |
MP before election
Thomas Arthur Lewis
National Liberal
Subsequent MP
Thomas Mardy Jones
Labour

The 1922 Pontypridd by-election was held on 25 July 1922. The by-election was held due to the appointment of the incumbent National Liberal MP, Thomas Arthur Lewis, as a Junior Lord of the Treasury. It was won by the Labour candidate Thomas Isaac Mardy Jones. It was the last of only eight ministerial by-elections in the UK not to be retained by the incumbent. The requirement for MPs who were appointed as ministers to seek re-election was entirely abolished by the Re-Election of Ministers Act (1919) Amendment Act 1926.

1922 Pontypridd by-election
| Party | | Candidate | Votes | % | ±% |
|---|---|---|---|---|---|
| | Labour | Thomas Mardy Jones | 16,630 | 57.0 | +14.2 |
| C | National Liberal | Thomas Arthur Lewis | 12,550 | 43.0 | −13.1 |
| Majority | | | 4,080 | 13.2 | N/A |
| Turnout | | | 29,180 | 72.8 | +4.5 |
| Registered electors | | | 40,071 | | |
| | Labour gain from National Liberal | | Swing | | |
