= Thomas Mardy Jones =

British politician & miner (1879–1970)

Mardy-Jones in 1922

Thomas Isaac Mardy Jones (21 January 1879 – 26 August 1970) was a British politician and miner. The son of a Welsh miner Thomas Isaac, who later died in the mines, Jones rose up the ranks of the Labour Party to become member of parliament for Pontypridd in 1922.

== Early life ==
Jones was educated at Ferndale board school before starting work as a coalminer aged 12. Since both his father and grandfather had died in coal-mining accidents, he was required to earn enough to support a family of six. He nonetheless managed to attend Ruskin College, Oxford, to study political and economic history for two years. Upon his return to south Wales, he successfully persuaded the South Wales Miners' Federation to offer ten college scholarships to miners.

== Career ==
Mardy Jones began his political career as lecturer in south Wales for the Independent Labour Party. In 1907, he assumed the position of checkweighman, however he suffered an eye accident in 1908. In 1909 he became the South Wales Miners' Federation parliamentary agent.

Mardy Jones defeated Liberal T.A. Lewis in the 1922 by-election to become M.P. for Pontypridd.

== Rail Vouchers ==
In December 1930 Jones gave his wife and 12-year-old daughter a pair of Commons rail vouchers, which they were caught using. Jones was taken to court and fined. He resigned his seat and did not stand at the ensuing by-election on 19 March 1931, but did contest the seat at the 1931 General Election in October as an Independent Labour candidate. He failed to regain the seat, polling only 1,110 votes and finishing in third place.

== Later life ==
Between 1928 and 1946, Mardy Jones studied in India, South Africa and the Middle East. He consequently worked in the Middle East as Education and Welfare Officer for the British forces stationed there 1945–46, following a position in the Ministry of Supply as Staffing Officer 1942–44. He later gained popularity as a public lecturer on foreign affairs, particularly concerning India and the Middle East. He became the National Coal Board's official economics lecturer after he was elected a F.R.Econ.S.

Mardy Jones wrote a number of volumes on reforming the rating system and local government, including Character, coal and corn – the roots of British power (1949) and India as a future world power (1952).

Thomas Isaac Mardy Jones died on 26 August 1970, aged 91, at Harold Wood Hospital in Essex.

== Personal life ==
Thomas married Margaret, daughter of John Moredecai, in 1911, and had two daughters. The couple separated in September 1933.

Parliament of the United Kingdom
| Preceded by Thomas Arthur Lewis | Member of Parliament for Pontypridd; 1922 – 1931 | Succeeded by David Lewis Davies |
Trade union offices
| Preceded by ? | Checkweighman at Mardy Colliery; 1907–1909 | Succeeded by Noah Ablett |
