= Thomas Arthur Lewis =

British politician (1881–1923)

Member of Parliament for University of Wales
- In office 1922-1923

Member of Parliament for Pontypridd
- In office 1918-1922

Personal details
- Born: 21 September 1881 Wales
- Died: 18 July 1923 (aged 41) London, England
- Party: Liberal
- Spouse: Marjorie Culross (m. 1919)
- Children: 1
- Education: University College, Cardiff

Thomas Arthur Lewis (21 September 1881 – 18 July 1923) was a Welsh school teacher, barrister and Liberal Party politician.

== Family and education ==
Lewis was the son of the Reverend J.M. Lewis, a Baptist minister from Cemaes, Pembrokeshire, and his wife Phoebe Griffiths. He attended the County School, Porth, and then University College, Cardiff, where he took a degree in science. In 1919 he married Marjorie Culross from Adelaide, South Australia, and they had one daughter.

== Career ==
After University, Lewis worked briefly as a school teacher but in 1910 he moved to London to become the private secretary to Freddie Guest who was at that time the Liberal MP for East Dorset. Guest would go on to become Chief Whip in the Coalition government of David Lloyd George. Guest later said that he talent-spotted Lewis and induced him to give up teaching and move to London to seek a political career.

Once in London, Lewis studied the law towards qualification as a barrister. Although he had what Guest described as a delicate constitution he joined the Officers' Training Corps at the Inns of Court in 1915 and was commissioned in April 1916. He served in Salonika from 1916 to 1918 and achieved the rank of Lieutenant. He resumed his law career on return to Britain and was called to the Bar by the Middle Temple in 1919.

== Politics ==
=== Election to Parliament ===
By the time of the 1918 general election Guest had become one of Lloyd George's closest advisers and his patronage must have been useful to Lewis in securing the nomination to become Coalition Liberal candidate for the Pontypridd Division of Glamorgan. It is not clear if Lewis was the recipient of the Coalition Coupon as he was opposed by a Conservative candidate at Pontypridd as well as by Labour. However the anti-socialist votes clearly migrated to Lewis as the Tory managed only 1.1% of the poll and lost his deposit. Lewis was elected with a majority 3,175 votes.

=== Welsh Liberal MP ===
Lewis spoke Welsh and English and spoke in Parliament in favour of Welsh Home Rule as part of a debate on a resolution moved by Edward Wood the future Lord Halifax to set up a committee of enquiry on federal devolution to all the home countries. As a result of the debate, which was supported by the Welsh members present, Lloyd George established a Speaker's Conference on Devolution which sat from October 1919 – May 1920.)

Lewis championed the rights of nonconformists in relation to the position of the Established church. As a Liberal, Lewis strongly disagreed with the state socialist approach of the Labour Party. He was a member of the Liberal Anti-Nationalization Committee but was in favour of co-partnership and profit sharing in industry.

=== Parliamentary appointments ===
Soon after entering Parliament, Lewis was rewarded for his service to his former chief with his appointment as Parliamentary Private Secretary (PPS) to Freddie Guest, who had been government Chief Whip since 1917. When, in 1921, Guest was made Secretary of State for Air in succession to Winston Churchill he appointed Lewis his PPS in succession to Lieutenant-Colonel J T C Moore-Brabazon.

In 1922, Lewis was appointed a Junior Lord of the Treasury to enable him to be the government's Welsh whip but under the constitutional arrangements of the day this meant he had to resign and fight a by-election in his Pontypridd seat. The by-election took place on 25 July 1922 and was a straight fight between Lewis and Thomas Isaac Mardy Jones for Labour. Lewis' majority of 3,175 at the 1918 general election was turned into a Labour majority of 4,080 at the by-election. Mardy Jones put his victory down to the disillusion of the electorate with the government's performance but also singled out what he clearly believed was the government's poor treatment of the coal miners.

=== University of Wales Member of Parliament ===
Lewis was not out of Parliament for long. The 1922 general election took place on 15 November, and by then Lewis had secured adoption as the Lloyd George, National Liberal candidate for the University of Wales Parliamentary constituency.

By this time Lewis was in poor health despite being relatively young at 41 years old. He contested the election from a nursing home. He won the seat defeating two strong opponents. Former minister Sir Ellis Ellis-Griffith stood for the Liberals. The Labour candidate was Dr (later Dame) Olive Wheeler, a university lecturer in education who later became Professor of Education at Cardiff University.

== Death ==
Lewis died suddenly in London on 18 July 1923, aged 41, eight months after his return to Parliament. He had been in poor health and undergone operations in August 1922 and at Easter 1923 after leaving the nursing home where he had stayed in 1922, possibly leaving him susceptible to infection.

Parliament of the United Kingdom
New constituency	Member of Parliament for Pontypridd; 1918 – 1922	Succeeded by Thomas Mardy Jones
Preceded by Herbert Lewis	Member of Parliament for University of Wales; 1922 – 1923	Succeeded by George M. Ll. Davies
