= Geoffrey Crawshay =

British Army officer (1892–1954)

Capt. Geoffrey Cartland Hugh Crawshay KStJ (20 June 1892 – 8 November 1954) was a Welsh soldier and social benefactor who is most notable for his connections to rugby union. He was also a Liberal Party politician.

== Early life and military service ==
Born in 1892 to Codrington Fraser Crawshay in Abergavenny, Monmouthshire, he was the great-great-great-grandson son of Richard Crawshay the ironmaster who oversaw the first major expansion of Cyfarthfa Ironworks. Crawshay was educated at Wellington College and later University College of South Wales, before taking up an apprenticeship at an ironworks in Cwmbran. In 1914 he joined the 3rd Battalions of the Welch Regiment before being transferred to the newly formed Welsh Guards. While with the Welsh Guards he obtained the rank of captain and in 1915 he was severely injured in his shoulder at the Battle of Loos. Crawshay remained with the regiment until 1924 creating many social societies, including the Welch Guard Choir and the regiment rugby team.

== Later life and social work ==
On leaving the armed forces, Crawshay attempted a career in politics. He ran as a Liberal candidate in several south Wales constituencies, but after failing to win a seat he left politics behind and moved on to social work. He was High Sheriff of Monmouthshire in 1939.

== Connections to rugby union ==
Crawshay had always shown a strong connection to the Welsh rugby players living in England; often travelling to Oxford and Cambridge Universities, inviting Welsh undergraduates to breakfast, in an attempt to recruit new rugby talent. In 1922, Crawshay was invited to bring a team to play against Devonport Services R.F.C. The resulting team banded together as Crawshay's Welsh RFC, an invitational team who still play to the present day. In 1924, English based rugby team, London Welsh were in a situation where the club lacked direction and focus. The team cabled Crawshay, who was at the time on a tour in Hong Kong, in a desperate bid to persuade him to take on the presidency of the club. He accepted the presidency of the club, a post he held from 1924 to 1939.

== Gorsedd of the Bard ==
Some of Crawshay's proudest military honours, were the Eisteddfod prizes won by his military choirs. A member of the Gorsedd of Bards with the bardic name 'Sieffre o Gyfarthfa', he was a mounted Herald of the Bard. Crawshay was not a Welsh speaker from childhood, so learned the language as an adult to fulfil his bardic duties.

== Biography ==
- Jones, Stephen; Paul Beken (1985). Dragon in Exile, The Centenary History of London Welsh R.F.C. London: Springwood Books. ISBN 0-86254-125-5.
