= List of places in Rhondda Cynon Taf =

This is a list of towns and villages in the principal area of Rhondda Cynon Taf, Wales. Towns are highlighted in bold.

== A ==
- Abernant, Aberaman, Abercwmboi, Abercynon, **Aberdare**

== B ==
- Beddau, Blaenllechau, Blaencwm, Blaenclydach, Blaenrhondda, Brynna

== C ==
- Church Village, Clydach Vale, Carnetown, Cwmaman, Cwmbach, Cwmdare, Cwmparc, Cwmpennar, Cefnpennar, Caegarw, Cefn Rhigos, Cwm-Hwnt

== D ==
- Dinas Rhondda

== E ==
- Efail Isaf

== F ==
- **Ferndale**, Fernhill

== G ==
- Glyncoch, Gelli, Groesfaen, Gilfach Goch, Glenboi, Glyntaff

== H ==
- Hirwaun

== L ==
- Llanharan, Llanharry, **Llantrisant**, Llantwit Fardre, Llwydcoed, Llwynypia, Llanwynno

== M ==
- Maerdy, Miskin, **Mountain Ash**

== P ==
- Penderyn, Penrhiwceiber, Perthcelyn, Penrhiwfer, Penrhys, Pentre, Penygraig, Pen-y-waun, Pontyclun, Pontygwaith, **Pontypridd**, **Porth**, Pontcynon

== R ==
- Rhigos

== S ==
- Stanleytown

== T ==
- Talbot Green, Trealaw, Trebanog, Trecynon, Trehafod, Treherbert, Treorchy, **Tonypandy**, Tynewydd, Tonyrefail, Tonteg, Ton Pentre, Tylorstown, Taff's Well, Treforest

== U ==
Upper Boat

== W ==
- Williamstown
- Wattstown

== Y ==
- Ynysybwl, Ynyshir, Ystrad

== Sources ==
ŋ:Map of places in Rhondda Cynon Taf compiled from this list

== See also ==
- List of places in Wales
