= Mountain Ash Comprehensive School =

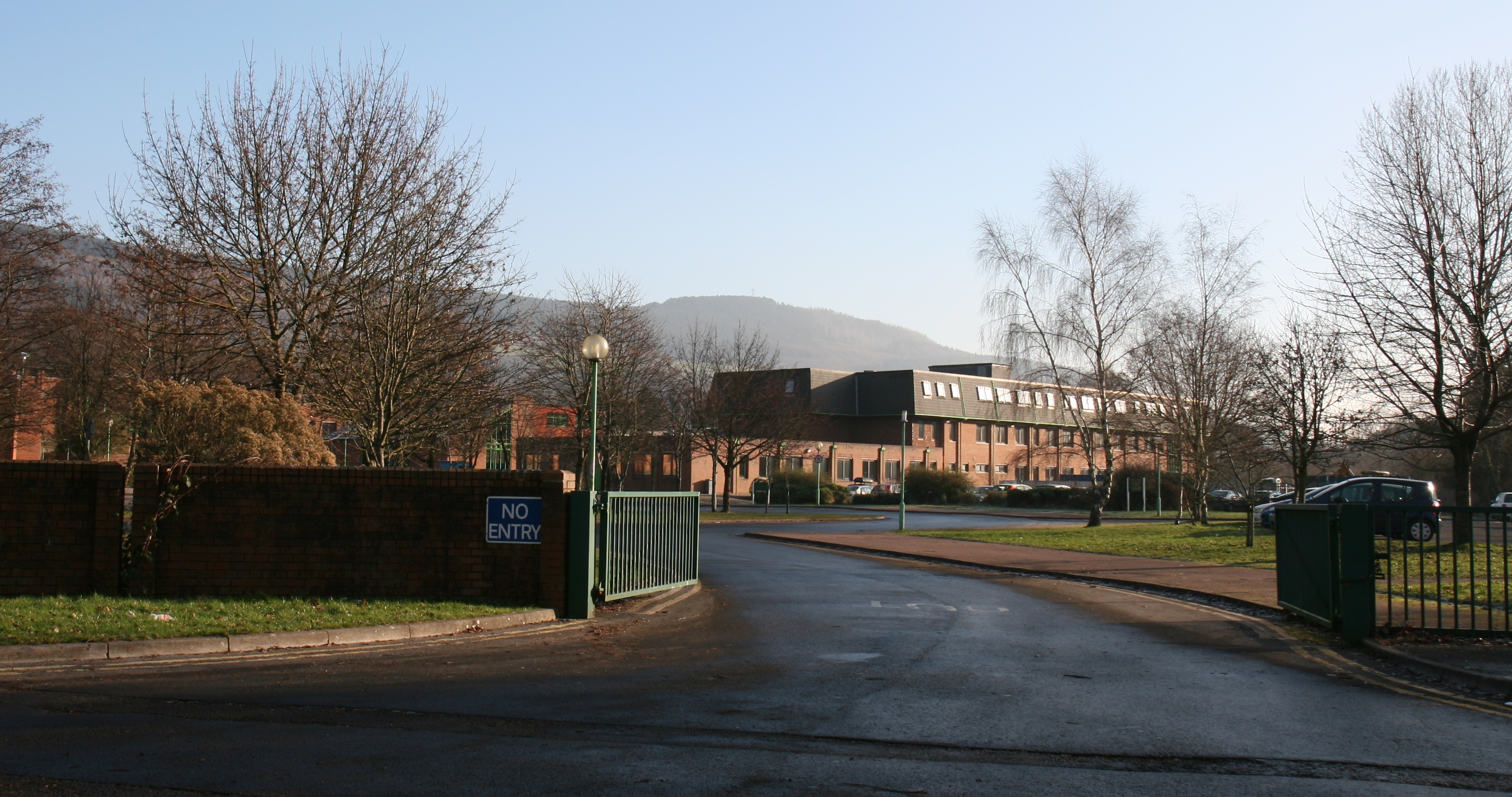

Location
- New Road; Mountain Ash, Rhondda Cynon Taf, CF45 4DG; Wales; 51°41′19″N 3°23′22″W

Information
- School type: Comprehensive School
- Motto: Every Child Will Succeed
- Established: 1901
- Local authority: Rhondda Cynon Taf
- Headteacher / Prifathro: Samantha Evans
- Gender: Male and Female
- Age: 11 to 18
- Enrollment: approx. 1,000 (2024)
- Houses: Cynon (green) Golwg (blue) Taf (yellow) Pennar (red)
- Colors: Green and Blue
- Website: www.macs.uk.net

Mountain Ash Comprehensive School (Welsh: Ysgol Gyfun Aberpennar), known as MACS, is a comprehensive school near the town of Mountain Ash, Rhondda Cynon Taf, Wales. It is a mixed-sex school with approximately 950 pupils, including about 90 in the sixth form. The school was formerly known as Mountain Ash Grammar School (Welsh: Ysgol Ramadeg Aberpennar) and is located near the former Dyffryn Colliery.

== Teaching ==
Mountain Ash Comprehensive School offers a range of subjects. Subjects that are taught at the school include: English, Cymraeg (Welsh), Science, Maths, Art, Music, Physical Education (PE), Information Communications Technology (ICT), Religious Studies (RS), Geography, History, French, Drama, Business Studies, Design Technology (which includes: Wood work, Home Economics, Engineering, Textiles), Hospitality, Vocational Studies.

As of September 2025, Mountain Ash Comprehensive School Sixth Form has no further intake due to financial constraints and pupils. A high proportion of the pupils move on to local Sixth Forms in Aberdare Community School or St John’s the Baptist High School, Coleg y Cymoedd, or other training organisations.

== Catchment area ==
The school's catchment area includes:

- Mountain Ash
- Penrhiwceiber
- Perthcelyn
- Abercynon
- Tyntetown
- Fernhill
- Glenboi
- Cefnpennar
- Cwmpennar
- Caegarw
- Newtown
- Darranlas

A few pupils come from further away, including from Aberaman, Abercwmboi and Cwmbach.

The main feeder primary schools are:

English Name	Welsh Name
Caegarw Primary School	Ysgol Gynradd Caegarw
Glenboi Primary School	Ysgol Gynradd Glen-boi
Darranlas Primary School	Ysgol Gynradd Darren-las
Miskin Primary School	Ysgol Gynradd Meisgyn
Newtown Primary School	Ysgol Gynradd Y Drenewydd
Pengeulan Primary School	Ysgol Gynradd Pengeulan
Penrhiwceiber Primary School	Ysgol Gynradd Penrhiwceibr
Perthcelyn Community Primary School	Ysgol Gynradd Gymuned Perthcelyn
Abertaf Primary School	Ysgol Gynradd Aber-taf
Carnetown Primary School	Ysgol Gynradd Carnetown
Ynys-boeth Community School	Ysgol Gymuned Ynys-boeth

== History ==
The school was founded as Mountain Ash County School in 1907, which was later known as Mountain Ash Grammar School (Welsh: Ysgol Ramadeg Aberpennar). From 1926 until 1983 the school was based in Dyffryn House, the former home of Henry Bruce, 1st Baron Aberdare (1815–1895). The house was found to be unsafe and was demolished; the current school is on the same site.

Selective education was abolished in the area in 1966, when the school became Mountain Ash Comprehensive School.

In 2019, five pupils won international travel scholarships: two to build a school in Rajasthan, India, two to explore in the Yukon, Canada and one to visit the Massachusetts Institute of Technology in the USA.

== School mottos ==
The motto on the school's crest is Deuparth Bonedd yw Dysg, which is Welsh for "The Root of Nobility Lies in Education". The school also uses "Every Child Will Succeed" (Welsh: Bydd Pob Plentyn Yn Llwyddo).

== Community ==
The school is a community school and takes that role very seriously. The school's aim is to be a place of learning and enjoyment not only for the students but for the wider community as well. Mountain Ash Comprehensive School is open for business from 8.00 in the morning through to 9.30 at night. Many national and local groups and organisations use Mountain Ash Comprehensive School's facilities. The University of Glamorgan base their Welsh for Adults provision at the school, and many local sporting clubs use the school's gym and barn facilities. The school runs tea dances for the elderly and organise many courses from the school during the holiday periods.

The school houses a community room which is home to E3, 5×60, On Track, and other specialist community workers. The school has developed developing the Mountain Ash Partnership to support local organisations working with young people in this area to work together constructively.

== Cynon Valley 16+ Consortium ==
The school was a member of the Cynon Valley 16+ Consortium which combines the sixth-form teaching resources of several local schools. These schools have approximately 350 sixth-form students, most of whom travel between the schools for tuition. The schools have a common sixth form timetable and a common registration and assessment management information system.

The students have access to a full sixth form curriculum to include a total of approximately 44 subjects which include traditional AS Level, A2 level and GCSE courses, and vocational BTEC, OCR and Key Skills courses. Some of the vocational courses are taught at Coleg y Cymoedd's Aberdare campus and at Merthyr Tydfil College.

Mountain Ash Comprehensive School, Rhondda Cynon Taf Council and the Consortium began discussions to close the Sixth Form in Mountain Ash and migrate all students who start September 2025 to Aberdare Community School. A cabinet meeting was held to discuss this on 20 November 2024 and the outcome was announced following the meeting.

== Notable former pupils ==
- Edmund Davies, Baron Edmund-Davies of Aberpennar (1906–1992), law lord (senior judge), chairman of the Aberfan Disaster Tribunal
- Les Manfield (1915–2006), Welsh Rugby Union international, later deputy headmaster of the school
- Bruce George (1942–), former Labour MP for Walsall South
- Stephen Williams (1966–), former Liberal Democrat MP for Bristol West
- Samantha Bowen (1986–), soldier and paralympic sitting volleyball player
