= Miskin, Mountain Ash =

Coordinates: 51.677030°N 3.372932°W

Miskin: Welsh: Meisgyn
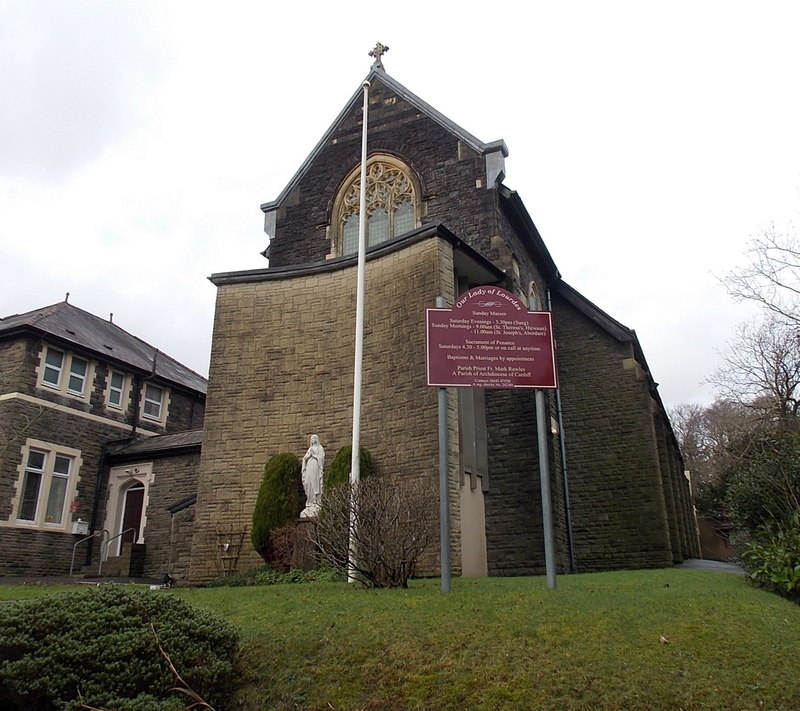

- Location within Rhondda Cynon Taf
- OS grid reference: ST 052 985
- Community: Penrhiwceiber
- Principal area: Rhondda Cynon Taf
- Preserved county: Mid Glamorgan
- Country: Wales
- Sovereign state: United Kingdom
- Post town: MOUNTAIN ASH
- Postcode district: CF45
- Dialling code: 01443
- Police: South Wales
- Fire: South Wales
- Ambulance: Welsh
- UK Parliament: Cynon Valley
- Senedd Cymru – Welsh Parliament: Cynon Valley

Miskin (Welsh: Meisgyn) is a village and district of the town of Mountain Ash within the Cynon Valley in Rhondda Cynon Taf, Wales.

The Miskin district is part of the community of Penrhiwceiber and, for the purposes of local and national governance, is part of the electoral ward of Penrhiwceiber, along with the district of Perthcelyn.

The former St Teilo's church was built c.1890 but since demolished and a meeting room, Miskin Hall, built on its site. As of 2018, Miskin Hall was empty and for sale.

== Geography ==
Miskin is located south of Darranlas, north of Penrhiwceiber, and is the location of Miskin Primary School.
