= Nos Galan road race =

Annual road running event in Mountain Ash, Wales

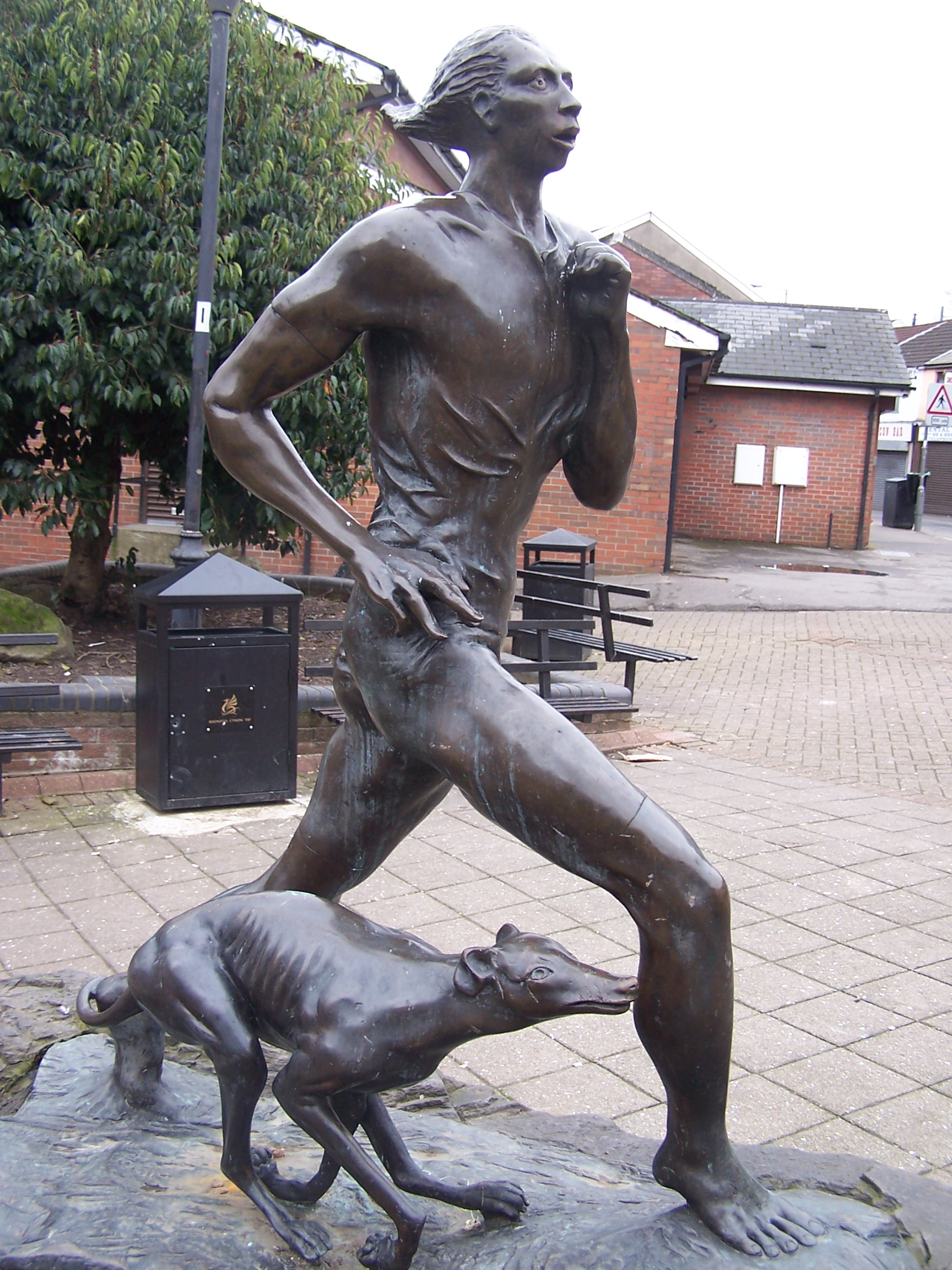
Guto Nyth Bran statue, Oxford Street, Mountain Ash

The Nos Galan road race is an annual five-kilometre (3.1 mi) road running event, held on Nos Galan (Welsh: Nos Galan), New Year's Eve, in Mountain Ash, in the Cynon Valley of South Wales.

== History ==
The Nos Galan race celebrates the life and achievements of Welsh runner Guto Nyth Brân. Founded in 1958 by local runner Bernard Baldwin, it is run over the 5 kilometres (3.1 mi) route of Bran's first competitive race.

At its height covered by the BBC nationally as part of its New Year's Eve celebrations, the races were halted in 1973 due to concerns expressed by the Glamorgan Police regarding the undue delay to traffic. The Nos Galan race was resurrected in 1984, when a reduced field of 14 runners ran a 1 mile (1.6 km) race. The race also broke with tradition, with three mystery runners, representing the present, past and future of athletics, carried the Nos Galan Torch.

It still attracts runners from all over Great Britain. The 2009 race attracted over 800 runners, and 10,000 people into Mountain Ash for the associated entertainment. In 2023, after two years of virtual races, the number of runners had grown to 1,925 participants.

A virtual race was held in 2020.

== Route and traditions ==
The main race starts with a church service at Llanwynno, and then a wreath is laid on the grave of Guto Nyth Brân in Llanwynno graveyard. After lighting a torch, it is carried to the nearby town of Mountain Ash, where the main race takes place. The format of the race has changed several times over its history. The current race consists of three circuits of the town centre, starting in Henry Street and ending in Oxford Street, by the commemorative statue of Guto.

Traditionally, the race was timed to end at midnight. But in recent times it was rescheduled for the convenience of family entertainment, now concluding at around 21:00.

Rescheduling has resulted in a regrowth in size and scale, and now starts with an afternoon of street entertainment, and fun run races for children, concluding with the church service, elite runners race and presentations.

== Mystery runner ==
The race is started and run by a mystery runner, normally a running or local sporting celebrity. The mystery runner lays the wreath:

- 1958 – Tom Richards
- 1959 – Ken Norris
- 1960 – Derek Ibbotson
- 1961 – John Merriman
- 1962 – Martin Hyman
- 1963 – Bruce Tulloh
- 1964 – Stan Eldon
- 1965 – Ann Packer
- 1966 – Mary Rand
- 1967 – Ron Jones
- 1968 – Lyn Davies
- 1969 – Lillian Board
- 1970 – John Whetton
- 1971 – David Bedford
- 1972 – David Hemery
- 1973 – Berwyn Price
- 1984 – Steve Jones, David Bedford, Lisa Hopkins
- 1985 – No Race
- 1986 – Kirsty Wade
- 1987 – Tony Simmons
- 1988 – Tim Hutchings
- 1989 – Bernie Plain
- 1990 – Phillip Snoddy
- 1991 – Dennis Fowles
- 1992 – Guto Eames, Tremayne Rutherford
- 1993 – Simon Mugglestone
- 1994 – Steve Robinson
- 1995 – Neil Jenkins
- 1996 – Robbie Regan
- 1997 – Iwan Thomas
- 1998 – Jamie Baulch, Ron Jones
- 1999 – Garin Jenkins, Dai Young
- 2000 – Christian Malcolm
- 2001 – Darren Campbell
- 2002 – Matt Elias
- 2003 – Stephen Jones
- 2004 – Nicole Cooke
- 2005 – Gethin Jenkins, Martyn Williams, T. Rhys Thomas
- 2006 – Rhys Williams
- 2007 – Kevin Morgan
- 2008 – Linford Christie
- 2009 – James Hook, Jamie Roberts
- 2010 – John Hartson, Mark Taylor
- 2011 – Shane Williams, Ian Evans
- 2012 – Dai Greene, Samantha Bowen
- 2013 – Alun Wyn Jones
- 2014 – Adam Jones
- 2015 – Colin Jackson
- 2016 – Chris Coleman
- 2017 – Nathan Cleverly and Colin Charvis
- 2018 – David Bedford, Sam Warburton and Rhys Jones
- 2019 – Nigel Owens
- 2020 – VIRTUAL RACE
- 2021 – VIRTUAL RACE
- 2022 – George North
- 2023 – Gareth Thomas and Laura McAllister
- 2024 – Lauren Price
- 2025 – Jess Fishlock
