= Mountain Ash Town Hall =

Municipal Building in Mountain Ash, Wales

- Neuadd y Dref Aberpennar (Welsh)
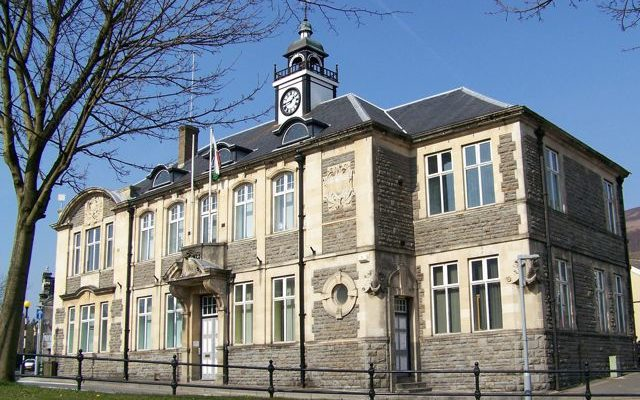
- Mountain Ash Town Hall in 2020

- Shown in Rhondda Cynon Taf County Borough
- 51.6841°N 3.3788°W
- Location: Ffrwd Crescent, Mountain Ash

History
- Built: 1904

Site notes
- Architect: J. H. Phillips
- Architectural style: Baroque style

Listed Building – Grade II
- Official name: Mountain Ash Town Hall
- Designated: 18 February 2003
- Reference no.: 80903

Mountain Ash Town Hall (Welsh: Neuadd y Dref Aberpennar) is a municipal structure in Ffrwd Crescent, Mountain Ash, Rhondda Cynon Taf, Wales. The town hall, which was the headquarters of Mountain Ash Urban District Council, is a Grade II listed building.

== History ==
Following significant population growth, largely associated with coal mining industry, the area became an urban district in 1894. In this context the new civic leaders decided to procure a municipal building: the site they chose had been unoccupied since the Nixon's Workmen's Institute relocated to the southwest side of the River Cynon in 1899. The rear aspect of the site, which was acquired for £1,000, was bounded by the Aberdare Canal.

The new building was the subject of a design competition which was won by J. H. Phillips of Cardiff. It was designed in the Baroque style, built in rubble masonry with ashlar stone dressings at a cost of £5,000 and was completed in 1904. The design involved an asymmetrical main frontage with nine bays facing onto Ffrwd Crescent; the central section of five bays, which was slightly recessed, featured a doorway flanked by pilasters and brackets supporting a segmental pediment containing a cartouche. There was a balcony and a French door on the first floor, while the other bays in the central section contained casement windows which were separated by full-height pilasters. The bay to the left of the central section featured a panel with a cartouche above the first floor window, while the bay to the right of the central section featured an oculus on the ground floor and a panel with a cartouche on the first floor. The last two bays on the right formed a wing which was significantly set back. There was a clock tower surmounted by a cupola and a weather vane at roof level. Internally, the principal room was the concert hall which was capable of accommodating 500 people.

The Aberdare Canal, at the rear of the property, ceased to be used for water transport in the early 1920s and was filled in to form the New Cardiff Road in 1933. The town hall continued to serve as the headquarters of Mountain Ash Urban District Council for much of the 20th century but ceased to be the local seat of government when the enlarged Cynon Valley District Council was formed in 1974. The building was subsequently used for the delivery of local services by Cynon Valley District Council and, after 1996, as workspace by the Leisure Department of Rhondda Cynon Taf County Borough Council.

The council announced, in March 2021, that, following the award of a grant of £250,000 from the Valleys Taskforce, the building would be converted for use as a co-working hub for small businesses.
