= Bethlehem Chapel, Mountain Ash =

Former chapel in Mountain Ash, Rhondda Cynon Taf, Wales

Coordinates: 51.6830°N 3.3812°W

Bethlehem, Mountain Ash was a Calvinistic Methodist chapel in Pryce Street, Mountain Ash, Glamorgan, Wales. Services at Bethlehem were conducted in the Welsh language.

== Early history ==
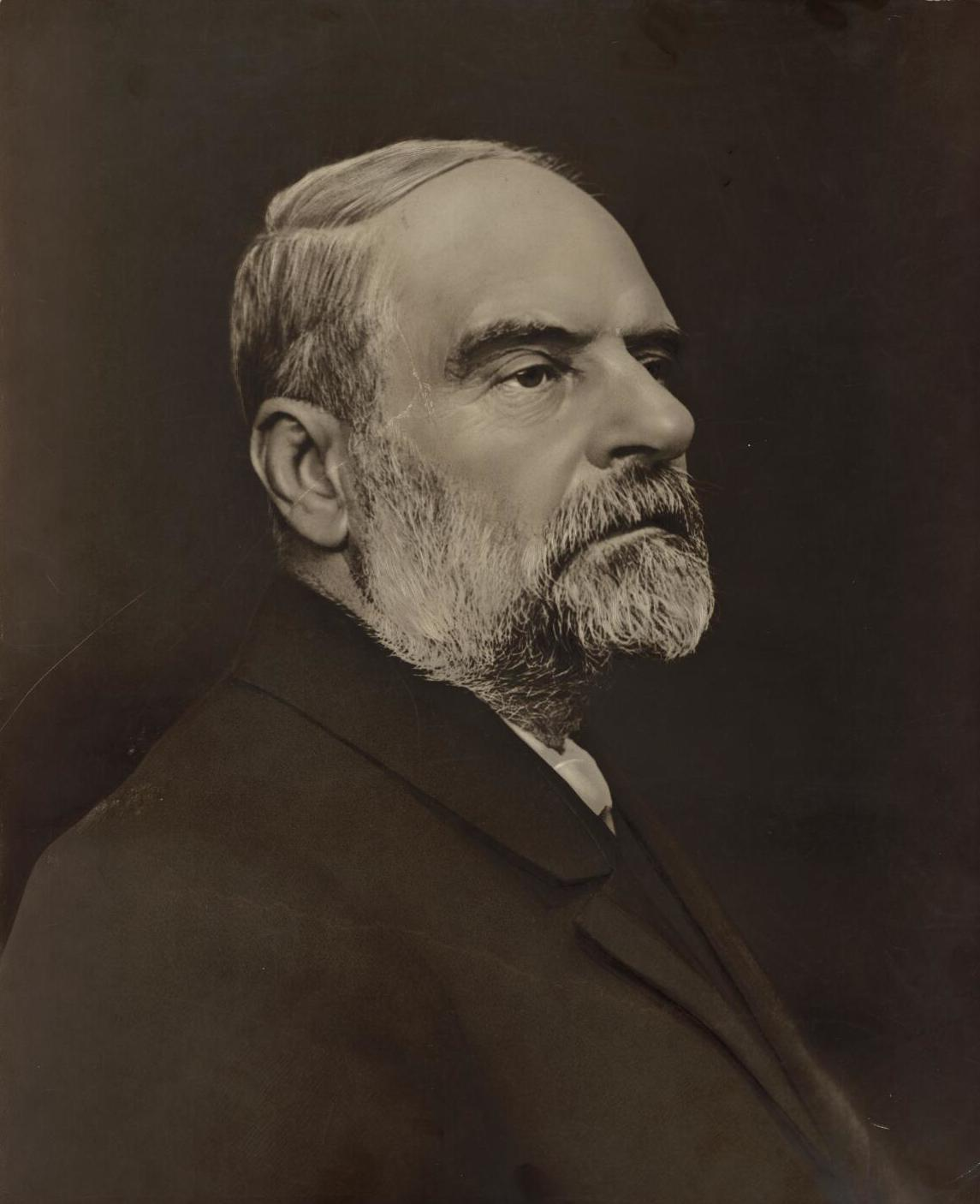
Morris D. Jones

The origins of the church date back to 1854, when meetings were held at a house in Commercial Street, and later at a house in Duffryn Street. A schoolroom was built in 1857, at a cost of £500, which became known as Capel Bach. Memorial stones for this building were laid by William Lloyd, draper, of Commercial Street and Rees Evans, grocer, amongst others. There was no permanent minister until 1870. During this period, Rev T. Rees and Morgan Edwards, the minister and deacon at Libanus, Aberaman, paid regular visits to support the young church. In 1870, the Rev. T. C. Phillips became minister and remained until 1884.

He was succeeded by M. D. Jones, formerly of Libanus, Dowlais, from 1884 until 1911.

Evan Roberts, the revivalist, attended Bethlehem for a brief period in 1899.

== Twentieth century ==
The chapel was rebuilt in 1900, designed by Thomas Roderick of Aberdare, at a cost of £2,000,

After 27 years as minister at Bethlehem, M. D. Jones died in 1911. A tablet in his memory was unveiled by the Rev J. Morgan Jones, Cardiff, in September 1913.

Following the death of M. D. Jones, the church was without a minister until J. R. Evans of Bwlch, Breconshire, was inducted as minister in July 1914.

Following the destruction of the Duffryn Boys School by enemy bombing in June 1941, the vestry was used as an infants' school from 1942 until 1948.

In 1952 a joint pastorate was established with the Independent church at Bethania and a new pipe organ was installed in 1953 at a cost of £950.

Bethlehem closed in 1980 and the building was demolished in 1990. Hillcrest Medical Centre was built on the site in 1992/93.

== Bibliography ==
- Jones, Alan Vernon (2004). Chapels of the Cynon Valley. Cynon Valley Historical Society. ISBN 0953107612.
