= Guto Nyth Brân =

Welsh athlete (1700–1737)

Griffith Morgan (1700–1737), better known as Guto Nyth Brân (Guto being a diminutive of Griffith and Nyth Brân (English: Crow's Nest) the name of his parents' farm near Porth), was an athlete. Many of Guto's running feats have since become merged with legend, and were disseminated by poets and authors such as I. D. Hooson, who wrote the ballad Guto Nyth Brân. Much of what is known of Guto was recorded by William Thomas (Glanffrwd) in his 1888 book Plwy Llanwynno (Llanwynno Parish).

== Early life ==
Guto was born in Llwyncelyn, a small village found today in the community of Porth. It was said that his talent first came to prominence as he was helping his father herd sheep when he managed to chase and catch a wild hare. Once locals heard of this there were new rumours every day of him catching hares, foxes and birds. One such legend has him running from his home to the local town of Pontypridd and back, a total distance of some 7 miles (11 km), before his mother's kettle had boiled. Another tale is that he could blow out a candle and be in bed before the light faded. His talent was noticed by a local shopkeeper, Siân o'r Siop (Siân from the Shop), and she became his trainer and manager.

== Races ==
The first race organised by Siân o'r Siop saw Guto taking on an unbeaten English captain over a distance of 4 miles on Hirwaun Common. Guto won easily and collected the £400 prize money, the first of many prizes he and Siân would win.

Guto and Siân fell in love. As Guto kept winning his races it became difficult for him to find willing opponents to race against. He and Siân decided to retire to a quiet life before Guto turned 30. But years later a new runner had come to the fore: his name was Prince and he was affectionately known as the "Prince of Bedwas". Siân convinced Guto to come out of retirement in 1737 for one race with the prize being 1000 guineas. This is equivalent to £200,000 in 2025.

The race was over 12 miles between Newport and Bedwas. Guto's effort looked in vain as Prince took an early lead, but a devastating uphill sprint from Guto saw him surge past Prince near the end and beat his challenger, taking the prize and the honour of being named the fastest man of his time.

== Death and burial ==
But the race took a fatal toll on Guto: it is reputed that during the post-race celebrations he collapsed and died in his lover's arms after an over vigorous congratulatory back-slap.

His body was laid to rest at St Gwynno Church in the Llanwynno forestry. A large gravestone was erected in 1866, over 100 years after his death.

== Nos Galan memorial race ==
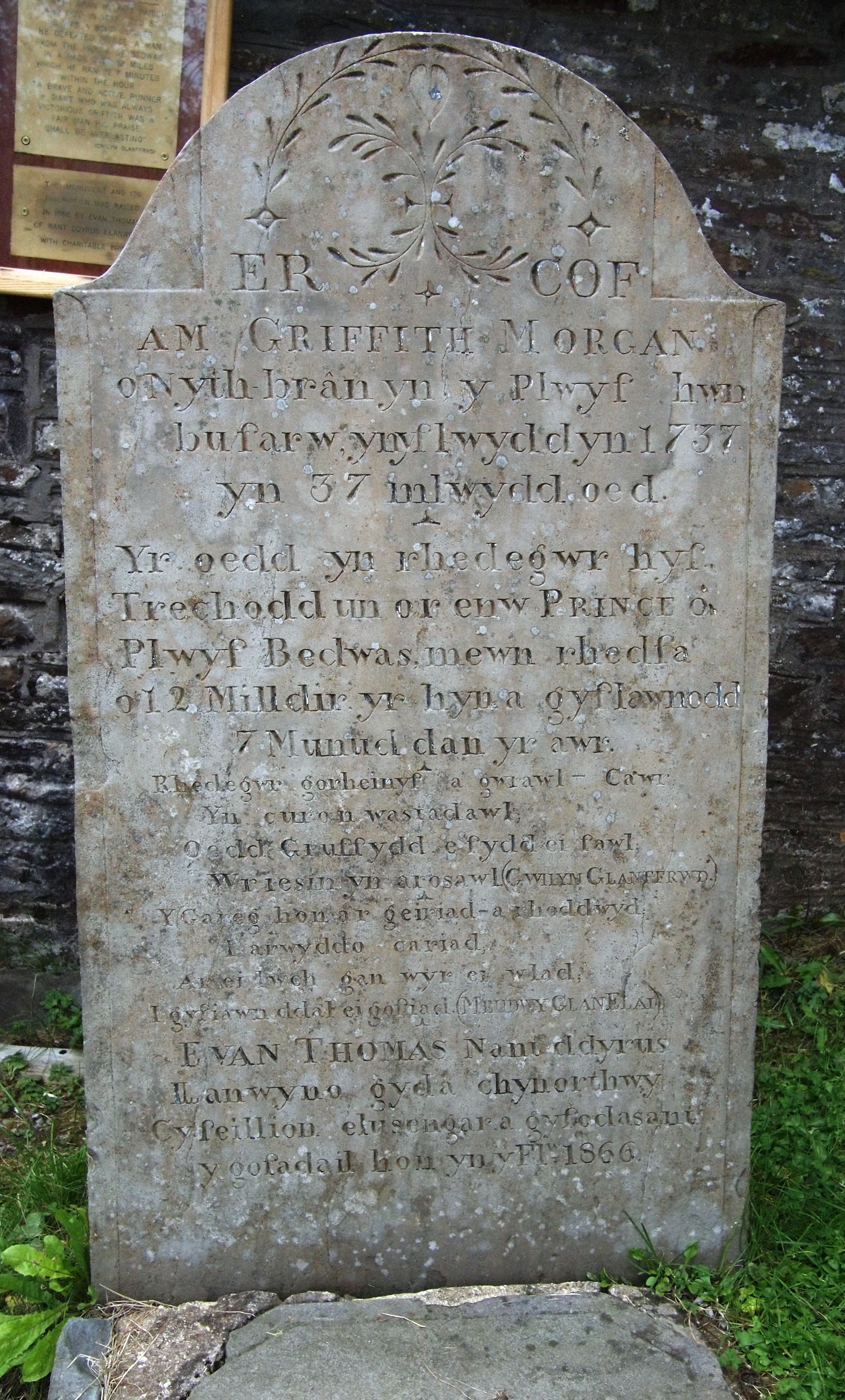
Guto Nyth Brân's gravestone, where a wreath is laid before the Nos Galan race

The Nos Galan road race (Welsh: Ras Nos Galan) is an annual 5 kilometre (3.1 mi) race, run on Nos Galan (New Year's Eve) in Mountain Ash, in the Cynon Valley, Wales. It attracts runners from all over Great Britain. The 2009 race attracted over 800 runners, and 10,000 people into Mountain Ash for the associated entertainment.

The race was created by Mountain Ash resident Bernard Baldwin, a PE teacher in Pontypridd and a President of the Amateur Athletic Association, in 1958 as a memorial. It is run over the course of Guto's first competitive race. Each year a mystery runner competes: these have included Lillian Board, Iwan Thomas and Linford Christie.

The main race starts with a church service at Llanwynno, and then a wreath is laid on Guto's grave in Llanwynno graveyard. After lighting a torch, it is carried to the nearby town of Mountain Ash, where the main race takes place. The current route consists of three circuits of the town centre, starting in Henry Street and ending in Oxford Street, by the commemorative statue of Guto.

Traditionally, the race was timed to end at midnight, but in recent times it was rescheduled for the convenience of family entertainment, now concluding at around 21:00. This has resulted in a regrowth in size and scale, and now starts with an afternoon of street entertainment, and fun run races for children, concluding with the church service, elite runners' race and presentations.

== Statue ==
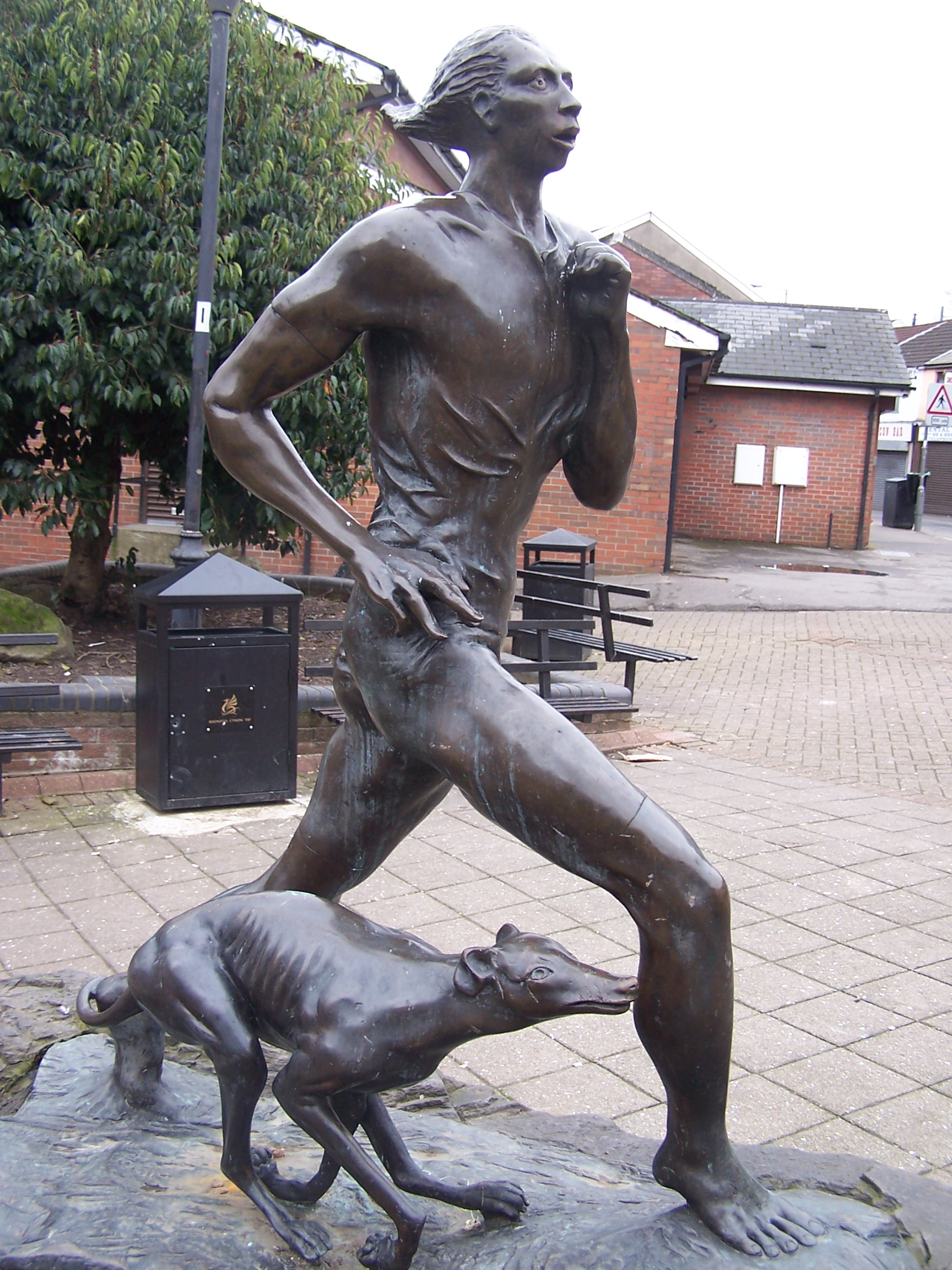
Guto Nyth Bran statue, Oxford Street, Mountain Ash, Wales

The statue in bronze of Guto Nyth Brân in the centre of Mountain Ash was commissioned by Mid Glamorgan County Council in 1990 and sculpted by Peter Nicholas.

== Bibliography ==
- Davies, John; Jenkins, Nigel (2008). The Welsh Academy Encyclopaedia of Wales. Cardiff: University of Wales Press. ISBN 978-0-7083-1953-6.
- Thomas, William (Glanffrwd) (1888), Plwyf Llanwyno, yr Hen Amser, yr Hen Bobl, a'r Hen Droion ['Llanwyno Parish, the Times, People, and Events of Old'], Pontypridd. 2nd edition 1913. Revised edition Llanwynno (1949), published by University of Wales.
