= Llanwonno =

Coordinates: 51.651°N 3.403°W

Llanwonno: Welsh: Llanwynno
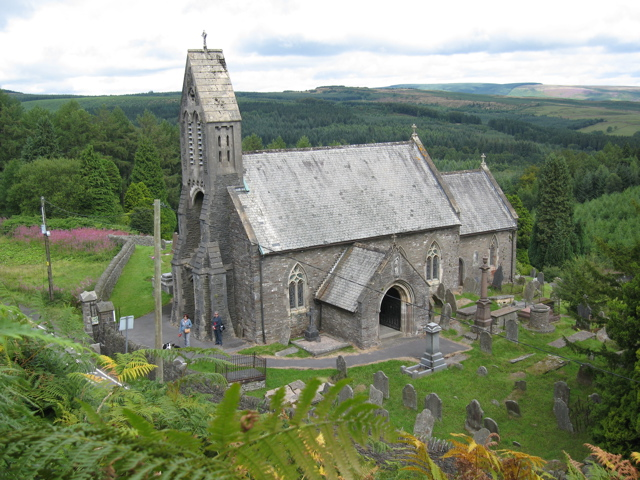
- Looking down on St Gwynno's Church

- Location within Rhondda Cynon Taf
- OS grid reference: ST029955
- Principal area: Rhondda Cynon Taf
- Preserved county: Mid Glamorgan
- Country: Wales
- Sovereign state: United Kingdom
- Post town: PONTYPRIDD
- Postcode district: CF37
- Dialling code: 01443
- Police: South Wales
- Fire: South Wales
- Ambulance: Welsh
- UK Parliament: Cynon Valley
- Senedd Cymru – Welsh Parliament: Cynon Valley

Llanwonno (Welsh: Llanwynno) is a hamlet high up on the eastern side of Cefn Gwyngul, in the hills between the historic mining valleys of the Rhondda and the Cynon in Rhondda Cynon Taf, deep in the heart of the South Wales Valleys. Llanwonno today consists of St Gwynno's Church and an inn – The Brynffynon Hotel.

== History ==
The ancient parish of Llanwynno (or Llanwonno) included Abercynon, Penrhiwceiber, Ynysybwl, most of Mountain Ash, part of Pontypridd (the area north of the River Rhondda and west of the River Taff), Porth, Stanleytown, Ynyshir, Wattstown and Blaenllechau in the Rhondda. The parish boundaries were adjusted in 1894 to remove the parts of the parish in the Ystradyfodwg (Rhondda) and Pontypridd urban districts, alongside other adjustments to make the parish cover the same area as the Mountain Ash Urban District.

The upland area around Llanwonno itself is easily reached on foot or by car, using mountain roads, which lead to Penrhiwceiber, Mountain Ash, Ferndale, Ynysybwl, and Pontypridd.

The legendary athlete Guto Nyth Brân (1700–1737) is buried in the churchyard. The story of the life, and death, of Guto Nyth Brân is remembered and celebrated in the centre of the nearby town of Mountain Ash every New Year's Eve, with an event known as the Nos Galan Road Races, in which runners hailing from all parts of the world race through the local streets, with the finishing-line placed at the point of the bronze statue of the legendary figure, which sits in the centre of a public seating area known as 'Guto Square' on Oxford Street.

A Victorian history of the parish, Glanffrwd's History of Llanwonno 1843–90, was published by the Rev. W. Thomas in 1888 in serial form in the Darian. A revised edition by Prof Henry Lewis for the University of Wales Press appeared in 1949.

Welsh writer and broadcaster Gwyn Thomas immortalised Llanwonno in his 1968 autobiography A Few Selected Exits, in which he recounted how every Sunday he and his father would begin a journey from their home in Cymmer in the Rhondda Valley to visit family in Mountain Ash. They never completed their journey, the pub in Llanwonno being the only place that would serve Gwyn's father on a Sunday. When Gwyn Thomas died in 1981 his ashes were scattered in the churchyard. Later, Llanwonno was used for location filming of the 1993 BBC film adaptation of Thomas' autobiography Selected Exits starring Sir Anthony Hopkins as Thomas.

The exterior scenes of the Doctor Who television episode The Hungry Earth (BBC, 2010) were shot in Llanwynno.

The nearby Llanwynno forestry is the location of the Daerwynno Outdoor Centre, an outdoor pursuits centre run by local people. The centre offers a wide range of activities to visitors, including several training courses for disadvantaged young people.

== Gallery ==
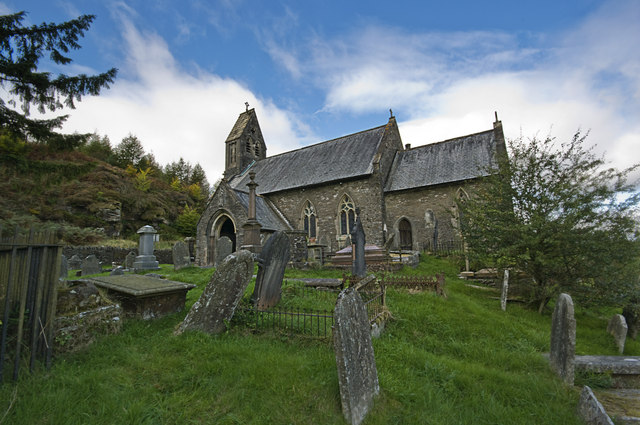
St Gwynno's Church

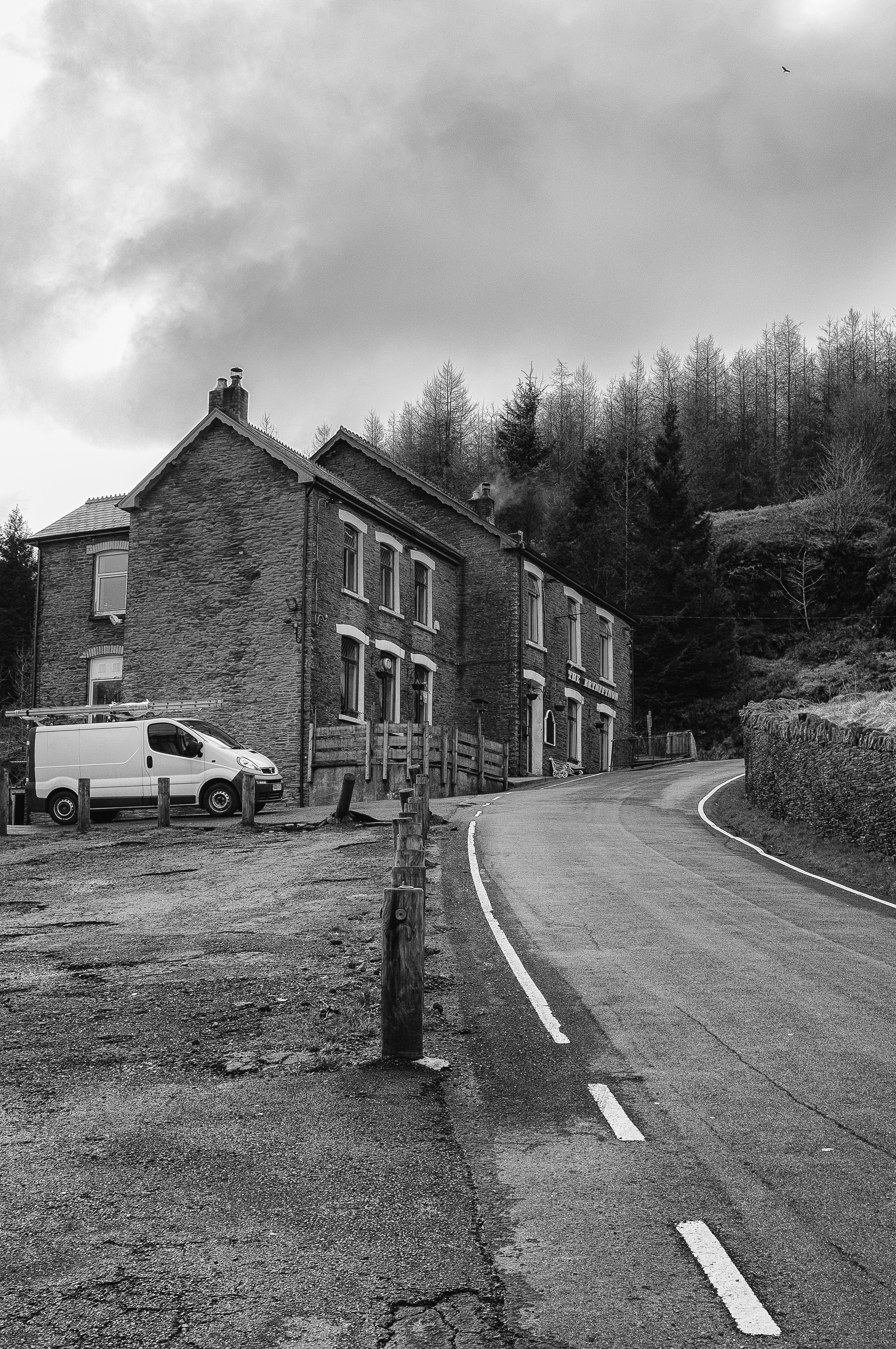
Brynffynon Hotel

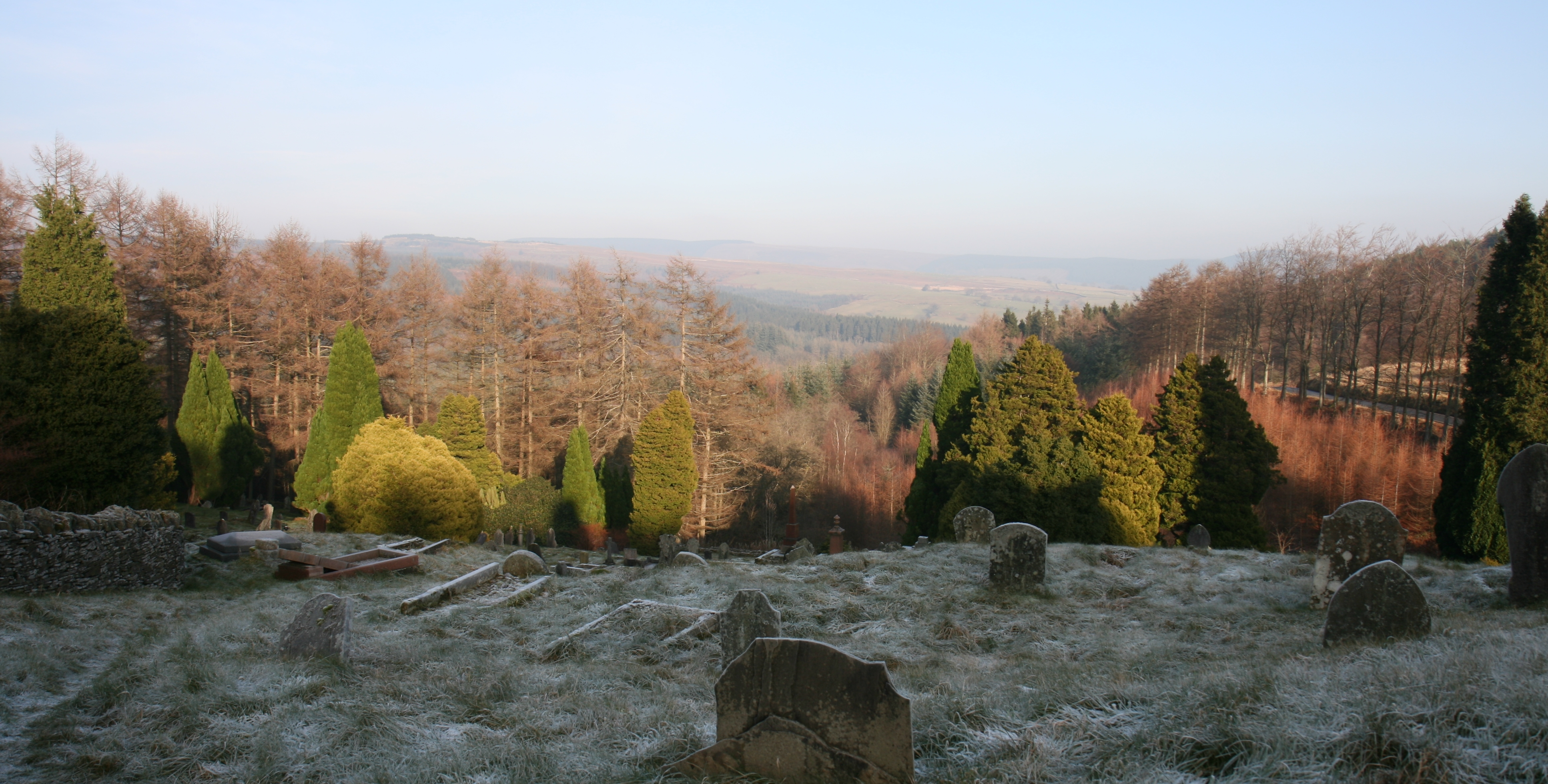
Llanwonno forestry from St Gwynno's Church Graveyard

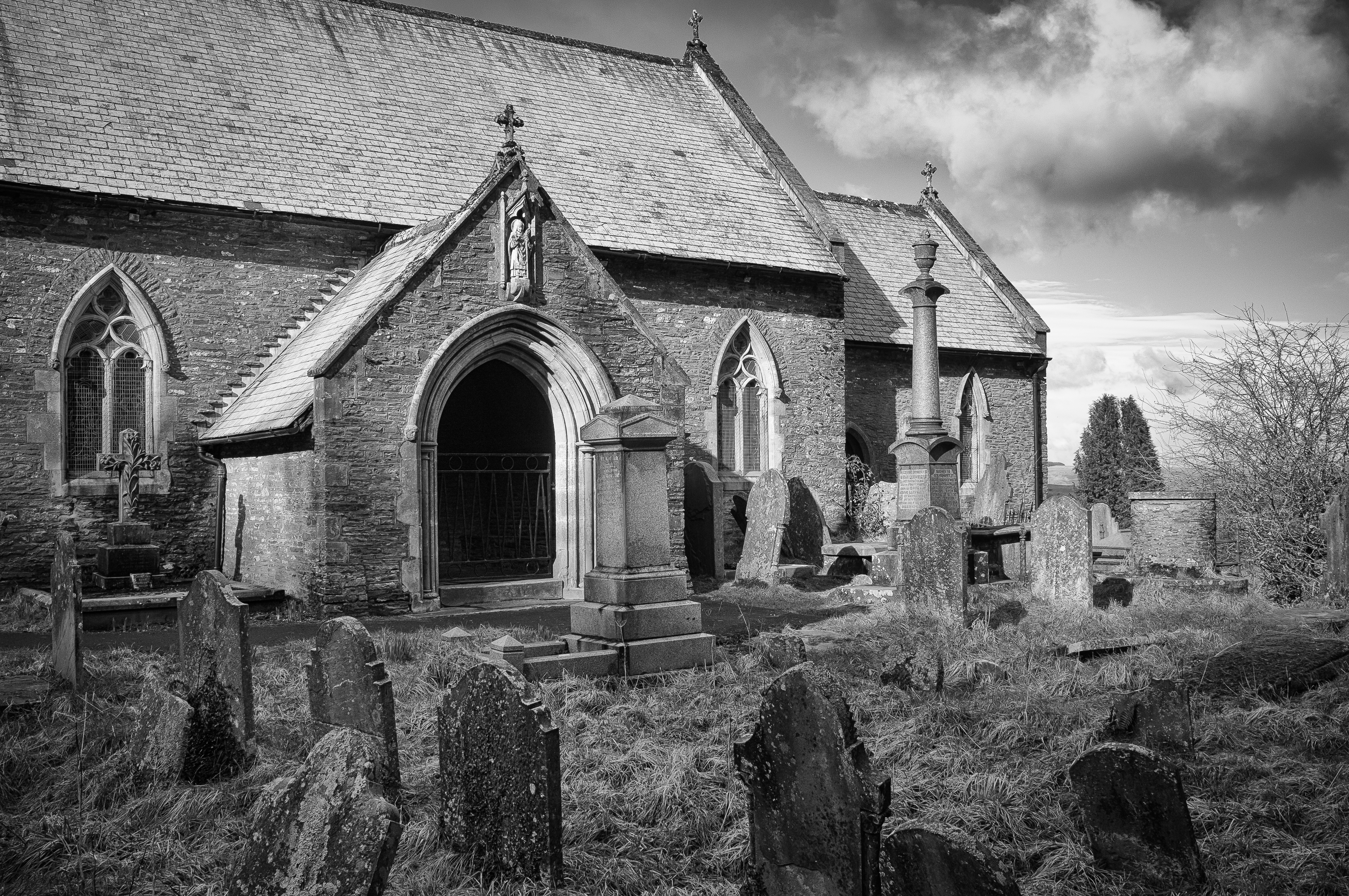
St Gwynno's Church
