= Bethel Chapel, Miskin =

Coordinates: 51.6762°N 3.3725°W

Bethel, Miskin was an Independent chapel in Glyngwyn Street, Miskin, near Mountain Ash, Glamorgan, Wales. Services at Bethel were conducted in the Welsh language.

== Early history ==
The church began in the form of a Sunday School held under the supervision of one Henry Eynon in the Long Room of the Bailey Arms. Members of Bethania, Mountain Ash, were instrumental in establishing the chapel, and weekly meetings were initially held in 33 Victoria Street. When this became too small, the first chapel, a zinc structure, was built in 1896 but demolished four years later to make way for a new chapel.

== Twentieth century ==
The chapel was opened in 1903 with seating for 600. It was built at a cost of £2,947 and the architect was T.W. Miller of Mountain Ash. The debt was cleared by 1923.

L. Bevan was minister until 1915 when he left for Pontnewynydd, Monmouthshire. After three years without a minister, J.H. Evans of Newport, Pembrokeshire, was inducted as minister in 1918.

== Later history ==
The chapel closed in the late twentieth century. Demolition work was filmed in 1995 for a HTV documentary entitled On the Chapel Trail which was presented by Professor Anthony Jones.

== Bibliography ==
- Jones, Alan Vernon (2004). Chapels of the Cynon Valley. Cynon Valley Historical Society. ISBN 0953107612.
