= Cefn Gwyngul =

Highest point
- Elevation: 470 m (1,540 ft)
- Prominence: 79 m (259 ft)
- Coordinates: 51.6668°N 3.4301°W

Naming
- Language of name: Welsh

Geography
- Location: Rhondda Cynon Taf, Wales
- OS grid: ST 012974
- Topo map: OS Landranger 170 / Explorer 166

Cefn Gwyngul is a long broad ridge to the east of the Rhondda Fach valley in Rhondda Cynon Taf County Borough in South Wales. Its 470m high summit is marked by an ancient cairn known as Carn-y-Pigwn, on which is a more recent trig point. Much of the hill is cloaked by modern forestry plantations though its southwestern flank between Porth and Ferndale has not been coniferised. The earthworks of a Roman camp remain on the ridge at OS grid ref ST 002982.

== Geology ==
The hill lies at the heart of the South Wales Coalfield and is formed from relatively flat-lying sandstones of the Pennant Sandstone Formation assigned to the Warwickshire Group, laid down in the late Carboniferous Period. Numerous coal seams within these beds have been worked in the past and the legacy of coalmining is widespread. The important Brithdir and Brithdir Rider seams outcropped along the upper western flanks of the ridge.

== Access ==
Minor roads ascend the slopes of the hill from Ferndale, Ynysybwl and Pontypridd converging at the elevated hamlet of Llanwonno. Various other public rights of way cross the hill though none reaches its summit. Route 47 of the National Cycle Network runs the length of the hill on its eastern side ascending via the minor road from Pontypridd to Llanwonno and then continuing northwest on forest tracks to join the A4233 above Maerdy. Those areas of forestry in the ownership of Natural Resources Wales (successor to Forestry Commission Wales in 2013) are open to public access, as are some areas of open moorland by virtue of the Countryside and Rights of Way Act 2000.
