= Hermon Chapel, Penrhiwceiber =

Coordinates: 51.6691°N 3.3599°W

Hermon, Penrhiwceiber was a Calvinistic Methodist chapel in Railway Terrace, Penrhiwceiber, Glamorgan, Wales. Services at Hermon were conducted in the Welsh language.

== Early history ==
Harmon was one of the largest chapels in the Aberdare Valley with seating for 800. The foundation stone was laid on 10 December 1894 and the chapel cost £4,000 to build. By 1896 there were 326 members.

The first minister was T.J. Edwards. Rowland Morgan was inducted as minister in 1900.

== Twentieth century ==
By 1931 the membership stood at 186.

The minister during the 1960s was D. Ben Rees who later ministered in Liverpool for over forty years. During his time at Abercynon, Rees completed a thesis on nonconformity in the Aberdare Valley which was later published in 1975 as Chapels in the Valley. However, during this period and thereafter there was a huge decline in membership.

Tabernacle closed in 1980 and was demolished in 1995.

== Bibliography ==
- Jones, Alan Vernon (2004). Chapels of the Cynon Valley. Cynon Valley Historical Society. ISBN 0953107612.
