= Samantha Bowen =

British volleyball player

Great Britain

Personal information
- Born: 21 March 1986 (age 40) Mountain Ash, Wales
- Listed height: 1.77 m (5 ft 10 in)

Career information
- Drafted by: FDSW Celtic Dragons

Samantha Bowen (born 21 March 1986) is a former British soldier and British sitting volleyball player. Bowen was discharged from the British Army in 2008 after suffering shrapnel wounds following a mortar attack during active duty in Iraq. Bowen subsequently took up the sport of sitting volleyball and represented Great Britain at the 2012 Summer Paralympics.

== Personal history ==
Bowen was born in the town of Mountain Ash, Wales, in 1986 and was educated at Mountain Ash Comprehensive School. She joined the British Army at the age of 16 and became a gunner in the Royal Artillery. In 2006 Bowen was on tour in Iraq, operating surveillance drones in Amarah. On 15 May a mortar attack against her base by Iraqi insurgents resulted in Bowen suffering shrapnel wounds to her right leg and back, which almost resulted in her bleeding to death. Emergency surgery saved her life in Iraq before she was flown to Selly Oak Hospital in Birmingham for further surgery. The injuries to her leg were severe, and after a dozen operations she still has paralysis of the leg which has also resulted in her wearing a brace on her foot to enable her to walk. In 2008, the British Army medically discharged Bowen, a decision that angered her. More recently, she underwent another surgery to have the lower leg amputated and refitted with a prosthetic leg.

== Sitting volleyball history ==
In 2011, an old school friend persuaded Bowen to try out a sitting volleyball team, the FSDW Celtic Dragons, based in Cardiff. Bowen made a strong impression and in September 2011 was part of the Women's Great Britain team that competed in the EVCD (European Committee Volleyball for Disabled) European Championships in Rotterdam. The team failed to win any of their games, finishing seventh. Bowen was then selected for the Women's Great Britain team to play in Cairo in the WOVD (World Organisation Volleyball for Disabled) Intercontinental Cup. Britain again finished bottom of their group.

Although not securing strong performances leading up to the games, as host nation, the Great Britain women's sitting volleyball team qualified for the 2012 Summer Paralympics, and Bowen was part of the 11 strong squad. The British team lost all three of their Paralympic matches failing to progress to the knock-out stages, though Bowen had a good game against Japan, finishing as the team's top scorer.

After the Paralympics Bowen was selected, along with Welsh Olympian Dai Greene, as the mystery runner in the annual Nos Galan road race.
