= Cynon Valley =

Former coal mining valley in Wales

Coordinates: 51.657°N 3.461°W

- Cynon Valley district (1974-1996) shown within Wales
- Area
  - 1974: 44,639 acres (180.65 km^{2})
- Population
  - 1973: 69,630
  - 1992: 65,600
- History
  - Created: 1 April 1974
  - Abolished: 31 March 1996
  - Succeeded by: Rhondda Cynon Taf
- Status: District, Borough
  - HQ: Aberdare (Welsh: Aberdâr)
Preceded by
Aberdare Urban District; Mountain Ash Urban District

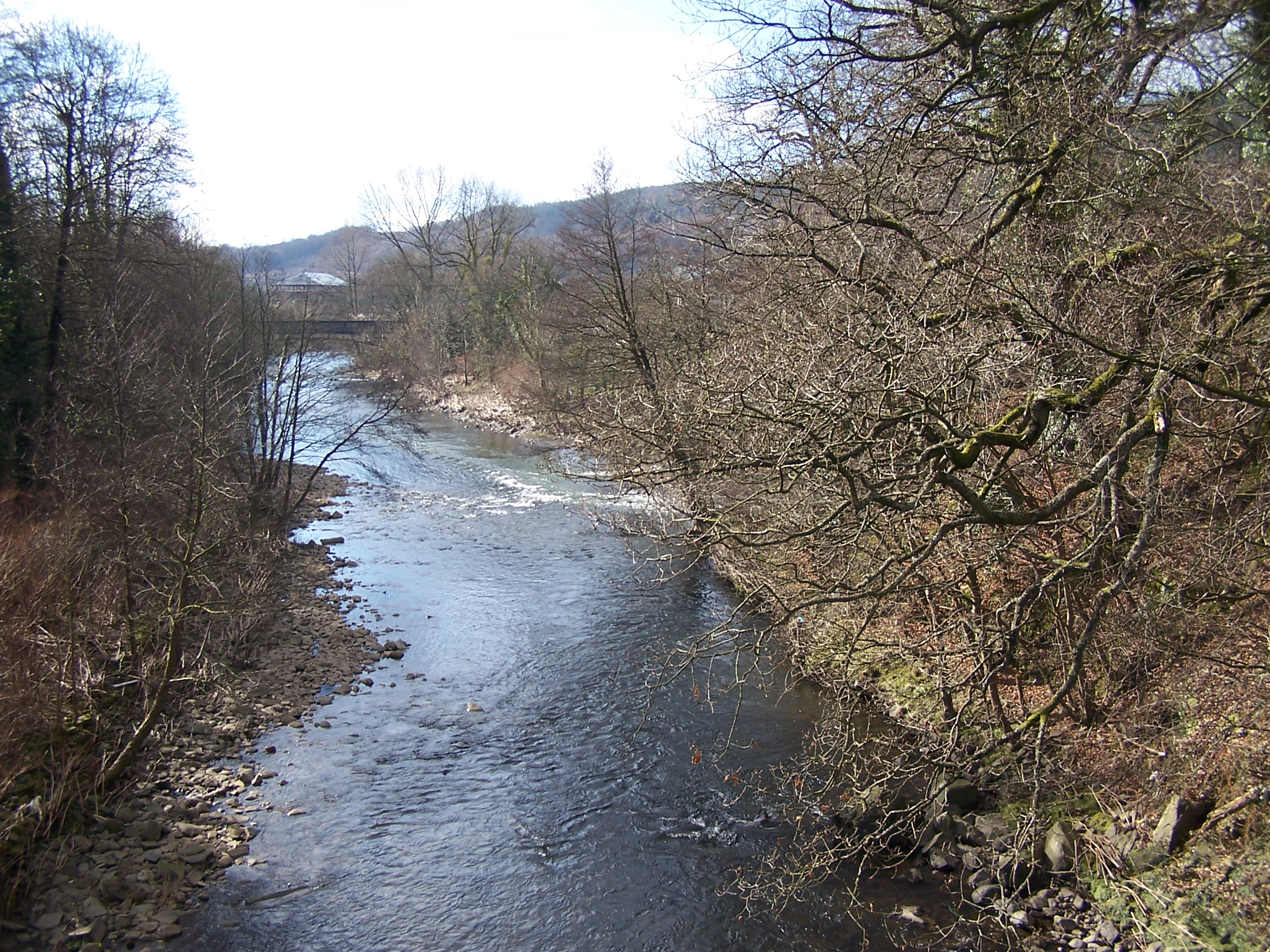
River Cynon from Abercynon bridge

Cynon Valley (Welsh: Cwm Cynon) is a former coal mining valley in Wales. It lies between Rhondda and the Merthyr Valley and takes its name from the River Cynon. Aberdare is located in the north of the valley and Mountain Ash in the south. From 1974 to 1996, Cynon Valley was a local government district.

At the 2001 census, the Cynon Valley had a population of 63,512, 12.1% of whom were Welsh speakers. In common with some of the other South Wales Valleys, Cynon Valley had a high percentage of Welsh speakers until the early 20th century.

== Former district ==
From 1974 to 1996, the borough of Cynon Valley was one of thirty-seven districts of Wales. The district was formed from the urban districts of Aberdare and Mountain Ash, the parish of Rhigos from Neath Rural District and the parish of Penderyn from Brecknockshire. It was one of six districts of Mid Glamorgan, and in 1996 was merged into the larger unitary authority of Rhondda Cynon Taf. Throughout the council's existence, the Labour Party held a majority of the seats on the council. The council was based at Rock Grounds on High Street in Aberdare, which was built in 1938 for one of the council's predecessors, Aberdare Urban District Council.

== Parliamentary and Senedd constituency ==
In 1983, the parliamentary constituency of Cynon Valley was formed for the election of a member of parliament to the House of Commons. The constituency had identical boundaries to the local government district.

In 1999, a Welsh Assembly constituency with the same boundaries was formed.

In 2010, the constituency was redefined as consisting of 15 electoral divisions of the county borough of Rhondda Cynon Taf: Aberaman North, Aberaman South, Abercynon, Aberdare East, Aberdare West/Llwydcoed, Cilfynydd, Cwmbach, Glyncoch, Hirwaun, Mountain Ash East, Mountain Ash West, Penrhiwceiber, Pen-y-waun, Rhigos, Ynysybwl.

The two main towns are Aberdare and Mountain Ash.

== Villages near Aberdare ==
- Aberaman
- Abercwmboi
- Abernant
- Cefn Rhigos
- Croesbychan
- Cwm-Hwnt
- Cwmaman
- Cwmbach
- Cwmdâr
- Gadlys
- Godreaman
- Hirwaun
- Llwydcoed
- Trecynon
- Penderyn
- Penywaun
- Rhigos

== Villages near Mountain Ash ==
- Abercynon
- Mountain Ash/Aberpennar
- Caegarw
- Carnetown
- Cefnpennar
- Cwmpennar
- Fernhill
- Miskin
- Newtown
- Penrhiwceiber
- Perthcelyn
- Pontcynon
- Tyntetown
- Ynysboeth

== College ==
Coleg y Cymoedd has a campus in the Cynon Valley based in Aberdare.

== Comprehensive schools ==
- Ysgol Gyfun Rhydywaun – Welsh-medium
- Mountain Ash Comprehensive School
- Aberdare Community School
- St. John the Baptist School (Aberdare)

== See also ==
- The Cynon Valley Party
- River Cynon
