= Bethania Chapel, Mountain Ash =

Chapel in Mountain Ash, Rhondda Cynon Taf, Wales

Coordinates: 51.6838°N 3.3768°W

Bethania
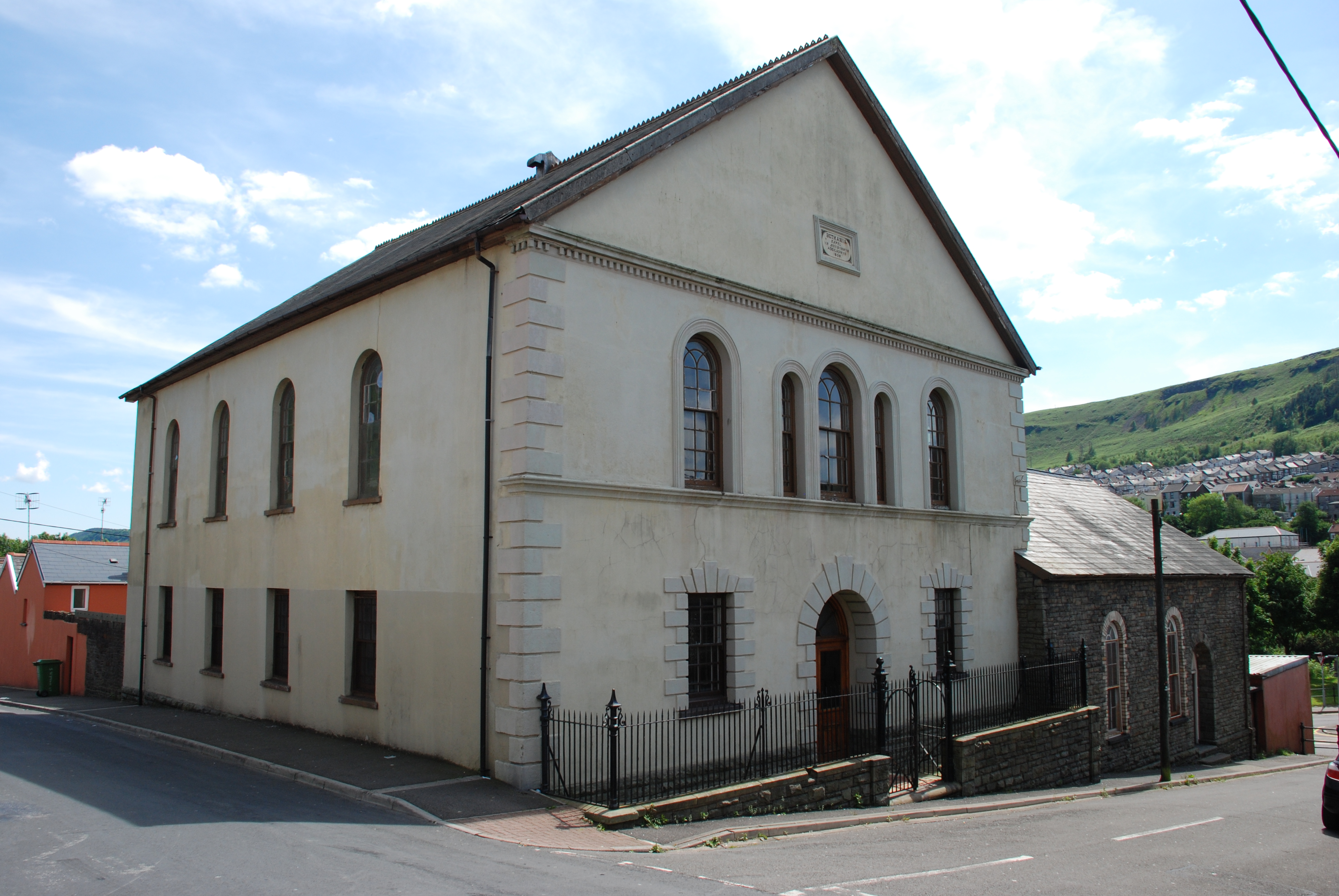
- Bethania
- Country: Wales
- Denomination: Independent (Congregationalist)

History
- Founded: 1850

Architecture
- Heritage designation: Grade II listed building
- Designated: 18 February 1999
- Architectural type: Chapel
- Style: Mid-19th century
- Completed: 1859

Bethania is an Independent chapel in Phillip Street, Mountain Ash, Glamorgan, Wales. Services at Bethania are conducted in the Welsh language.

== Early history ==
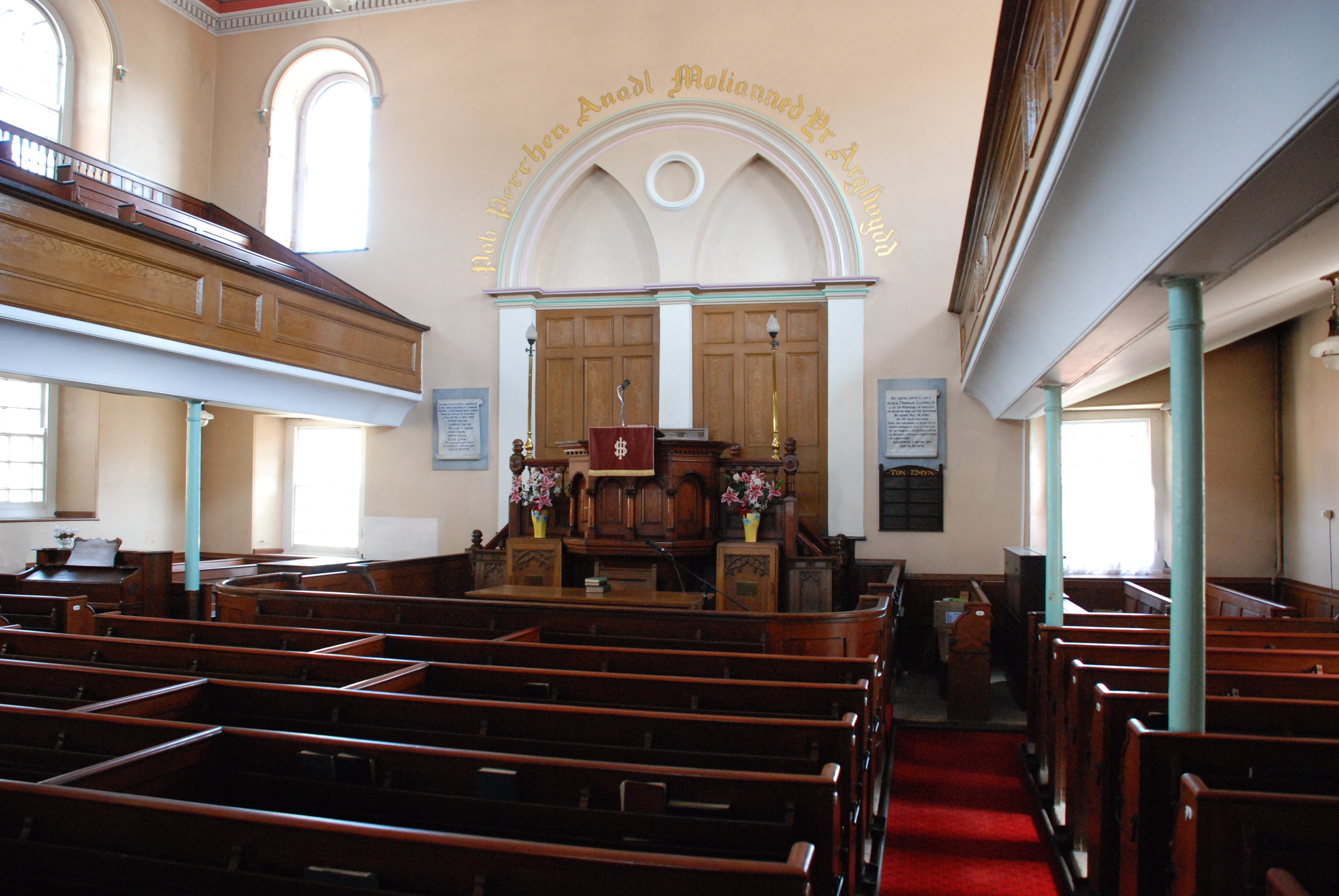
Interior

The church began in the form of a Sunday school built in 1850, although earlier meetings had been held at the home of one Daniel Rowlands, which later became the Glancynon Inn. The first chapel was built in 1854 at a cost of £320, but became too small as a result of the religious revival of 1859. A new chapel was therefore built at a cost of £950 with seating for 750. This coincided with the sinking of the Deep Duffryn Colliery in 1855, which led to a large influx of people into the area.

David Edward Coleman (Eos Hefin), also known as Coleman Bach (Little Coleman), was a prominent member of Bethania. For many years he conducted the chapel choir and was one of the conductors of the South Wales Choral Union which won the first prize at a celebrated choral competition at the Crystal Palace in London in 1872. Coleman kept a grocery and drapery business at 54 Commercial Street, Mountain Ash.

The chapel was enlarged in 1887 and a new vestry built alongside. Thomas Llewellyn was minister from 1854 until 1888. He was succeeded by Owen Jones, who remained until 1909.

== Twentieth century ==
John Phillips was minister from 1911 until 1945 and Haydn Davies from 1950 until 1960.

The chapel remains beautifully preserved and maintained. There were 20 members in 2004. Mountain Ash and District Choral Society hold their practices and rehearsals at the vestry.

== Bibliography ==
- Jones, Alan Vernon (2004). Chapels of the Cynon Valley. Cynon Valley Historical Society. ISBN 0953107612.
