= River Cynon =

River in south Wales

Coordinates: 51.6455458°N 3.3260799°W

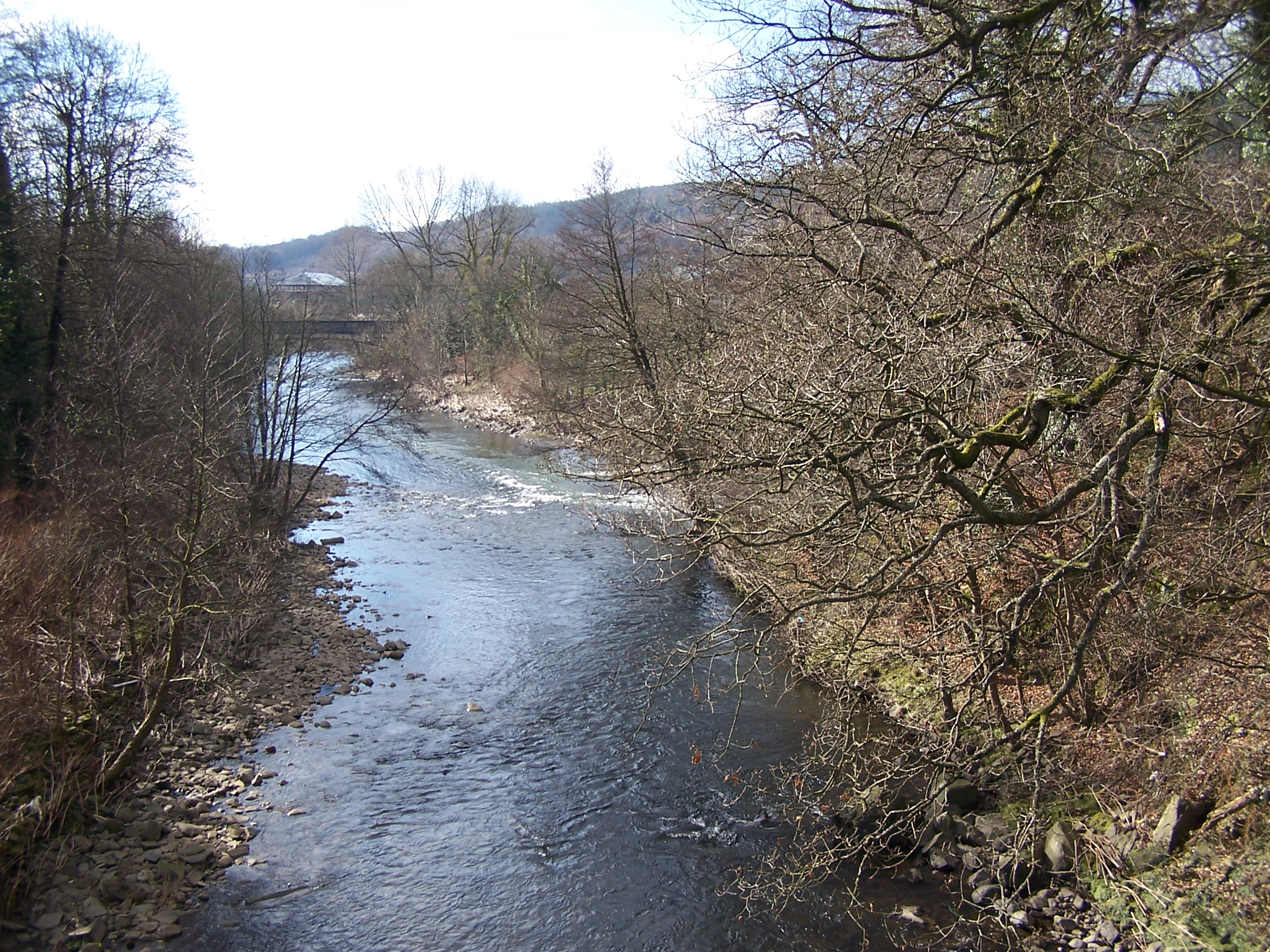
- River Cynon from Abercynon bridge
- Native name: Afon Cynon (Welsh)

Location
- Country: Wales
- Historic county: Glamorgan
- Unitary Authority: Rhondda Cynon Taf
- Settlements: Aberdare, Mountain Ash, Abercynon

The River Cynon (Welsh: Afon Cynon) in South Wales is a main tributary of the Taff. Its source is the rising of Llygad Cynon (OS grid ref SN 95240 07740) at 219 m (719 ft) above sea level at Penderyn, Rhondda Cynon Taf and flows roughly southeast, into the Taff at Abercynon in the same district. The water emerging at Llygad Cynon has been traced back to the sink of the Nant Cadlan at Ogof Fawr.

== Course ==
The Nant Cadlan and its tributary the Ceunant Du rise on the slopes of Cefn Cadlan to the northeast of Penderyn flowing initially southeast and then south on the east side of the village to the point where the Cynon arises, adding to the flow emerging from the rising. The waters of the Nant y Bwllfa enter the Cynon as a left-bank tributary between Penderyn and Hirwaun. Downstream, the course of the river has been altered at the former Hirwaun Ironworks. The combined flow of the Nant Hir and Nant Melyn enter the river to the north of Penywaun and that of the Nant y Gwyddel to the east of Penywaun. The Dare River enters as a right bank tributary at Aberdare and the Aman River at Aberaman. The final tributary of any size is the Nant Pennar which enters on the Cynon's left bank at Mountain Ash (Welsh: Aberpennar).

== Hydronymy ==
The name is recorded as Canan in 1253 and Kenon in 1536-9, with the final vowel pronounced with an ə sound. While Thomas Morgan stated that the name was a compound of the elements "cyn" (meaning chief) and "ain" (water or brook), giving a meaning of the "chief brook", modern writers more commonly state that the river derives from a personal name, Cynan or Cynon. This is also the preferred derivation for the Ffrwd Cynon, a tributary of the Teifi. However, no eponym has been identified for either river.

== Related terms ==
Together with two neighbouring rivers, it gives its name to a local authority, with unitary status, Rhondda Cynon Taf.

The valley, broadly defined as the bulk of the drainage basin is detailed in Cynon Valley.
