= Mountain Ash Urban District =

UK local government area, 1894 - 1908

Coordinates: 51°41′03″N 3°22′44″W

Mountain Ash Urban District was a local authority in Mountain Ash, in the Cynon Valley, Glamorgan, Wales. It was created in 1894 as a result of the 1894 Local Government of England and Wales Act. The council replaced the Mountain Ash Local Board of Health which had been established in 1867. Initially, the Council had fifteen members, but this was increased to eighteen in 1898. The council was based at Mountain Ash Town Hall. The urban district was abolished in 1974, becoming part of the borough of Cynon Valley, which was in turn abolished in 1996 to become part of Rhondda Cynon Taf.

== 1894 Election ==
The inaugural election was held in December 1894. Among those elected were two checkweighers at local collieries, John Powell and John Williams. Williams later served as MP for Gower from 1906 until 1922.

=== East Ward ===
East Ward
Party	Candidate	Votes	%	±%
	Rees Price	437		
	Gwilym Jones	399		
	Jabez Long	381		
	Morgan Morgan	355		
	William Little	352		
	John Powell	317		
	Henry Eynon	293		
	Isaac George	213		

=== South Ward ===
South Ward
Party	Candidate	Votes	%	±%
	Dr Morgan	480		
	John Williams	444		
	Rev J.F. Williams	289		
	Cornelius Williams	106		

=== West Ward ===
West Ward
Party	Candidate	Votes	%	±%
	J.W. Jones	770		
	Evan Morgan	608		
	James Davies	598		
	Adam Clark	546		
	Thomas Edmunds	542		
	Thomas Jones	521		
	William James	516		
	W. Phillips Bowden	438		
	D.T. Phillips	361		
	William A. Jenkins	260		

== 1896 Election ==
In two of the three wards candidates were returned unopposed.

=== East Ward ===
East Ward
Party	Candidate	Votes	%	±%
	William Little*	Unopposed		
	John Powell*	Unopposed		

=== South Ward ===
South Ward
Party	Candidate	Votes	%	±%
	Rev J.F. Williams*	Unopposed		

=== West Ward ===
The only contested election in the West Ward was contested by four Liberals.

West Ward
Party	Candidate	Votes	%	±%
Liberal	Thomas Jones*	711		
Liberal	Isaac George	615		
Liberal	James James	557		
Liberal	Thomas Edmunds*	556		

== 1898 Election ==
Following significant growth in the population of the locality the wards were redrawn for this election and all members were obliged to seek re-election for six new wards, each of which returned three members. A number of nominated candidates withdrew before the election. Several retiring councillors were defeated.

=== Abercynon Ward ===
Abercynon Ward
Party	Candidate	Votes	%	±%
	Frederick Joseph Williams	324		
	Evan Jones	245		
	William Evans	221		
	Llewelyn Rees Powell	152		

=== Darranlas Ward ===
Darranlas Ward
Party	Candidate	Votes	%	±%
	Evan Morgan*	317		
	Thomas Edmunds	307		
	Morgan Morgan*	285		
	David Williams	239		
	Jabez Long*	190		
	William Lamburn	171		

=== Duffryn Ward ===
Duffryn Ward
Party	Candidate	Votes	%	±%
	James Davies*	324		
	Rees Price*	298		
	William Little*	269		
	Gwilym Jones*	257		
	William P. Bowden	185		
	William Probert	151		

=== Miskin Ward ===
Miskin Ward
Party	Candidate	Votes	%	±%
	John Powell*	291		
	Fred Noel Gray	212		
	James James	237		
	Adam Clark*	217		
	Isaac George*	170		

=== Penrhiwceiber Ward ===
Penrhiwceiber Ward
Party	Candidate	Votes	%	±%
	William Phillips	373		
	William Lewis	275		
	Thomas Bevan	269		
	Thomas Jones*	214		
	William James*	173		

=== Ynysybwl Ward ===
Ynysybwl Ward
Party	Candidate	Votes	%	±%
	Rhys David Morgan*	451		
	David Rogers	323		
	David William Howell	276		
	Gomer Jones	234		

== 1899 Election ==
Only one ward was contested, namely Miskin, where Adam Clark regained a seat he has lost the previous year. In Duffryn Ward the sitting councillor William Litle was nominated but withdrew in favour of Gwilym Jones, a former member defeated in 1898.

=== Abercynon Ward ===
Abercynon Ward
Party	Candidate	Votes	%	±%
	William Evans*	Unopposed		

=== Darranlas Ward ===
Darranlas Ward
Party	Candidate	Votes	%	±%
	Morgan Morgan*	Unopposed		

=== Duffryn Ward ===
Duffryn Ward
Party	Candidate	Votes	%	±%
	Gwilym Jones	Unopposed		

=== Miskin Ward ===
Miskin Ward
Party	Candidate	Votes	%	±%
	Adam Clark	290		
	James James*	189		

=== Penrhiwceiber Ward ===
Penrhiwceiber Ward
Party	Candidate	Votes	%	±%
	Thomas Bevan*	Unopposed		

=== Ynysybwl Ward ===
Ynysybwl Ward
Party	Candidate	Votes	%	±%
	David William Howell*	Unopposed		

== 1908 Election ==
There were elections in all four wards.

=== Darranlas Ward ===
East Ward
Party	Candidate	Votes	%	±%
Labour	W. Lamburn	510		
Conservative	Major Morgan	343		

=== Duffryn Ward ===
East Ward
Party	Candidate	Votes	%	±%
Conservative	Griffith Evans	417		
Labour	Richard Parsons*	381		

=== Penrhiwceiber Ward ===
East Ward
Party	Candidate	Votes	%	±%
Labour	George Henry Hall	506		
Liberal	J.P. Davies*	475		

=== Abercynon Ward ===
East Ward
Party	Candidate	Votes	%	±%
Independent	W. Evans	443		
Liberal	W. Fenwick*	364		
Labour	W. Jenkins	331		
