= Caegarw =

Coordinates: 51.680503°N 3.3693610°W

- Location within Rhondda Cynon Taf
- OS grid reference: ST 0542 9886
- Community: Mountain Ash
- Principal area: Rhondda Cynon Taf
- Preserved county: Mid Glamorgan
- Country: Wales
- Sovereign state: United Kingdom
- Post town: MOUNTAIN ASH
- Postcode district: CF45
- Dialling code: 01443
- Police: South Wales
- Fire: South Wales
- Ambulance: Welsh
- UK Parliament: Cynon Valley
- Senedd Cymru – Welsh Parliament: Cynon Valley

Caegarw is a large village situated in Mountain Ash, in Rhondda Cynon Taff, Wales.

== Location ==
It is close to Cefnpennar and Cwmpennar. It is about a 2-minute walk from Mountain Ash town centre.

== Facilities ==
A parish church, three public houses, a bowling club, YMCA, fish and chip shop, village shops, Job Centre, primary school (Caegarw Primary School), hospital and a large park and playing fields and two barber shops.
