= Darranlas =

Coordinates: 51.68139°N 3.37916°W

Darranlas: Welsh: Darran-las
- Location within Rhondda Cynon Taf
- OS grid reference: ST025915
- Community: Mountain Ash
- Principal area: Rhondda Cynon Taf
- Preserved county: Mid Glamorgan
- Country: Wales
- Sovereign state: United Kingdom
- Post town: MOUNTAIN ASH
- Postcode district: CF45
- Dialling code: 01443
- Police: South Wales
- Fire: South Wales
- Ambulance: Welsh
- UK Parliament: Cynon Valley
- Senedd Cymru – Welsh Parliament: Cynon Valley

Darranlas is a large village in Mountain Ash, Rhondda Cynon Taf in South Wales.

== History ==
The houses in the area are around 100–130 years old. Before the houses were built the area of Darranlas was Glyngwyn Farm. Darrenlas primary school was built in 1907 and is located in Kingcraft Street, the school is a feeder to Mountain Ash Comprehensive School. There was another primary school in the area known as Cynon Infants but it has now closed. The local public house in the area is the Napiers arms, named after General Charles James Napier. The pub is shaped like a coffin and the reason is believed that it was once owned by an undertaker. It is also believed that the street behind the pub is called Dover Street because a number of people came to the area in the 1800s from Dover to build the streets. There are also other streets that are named after the Bruce family which is the family of Lord Aberdare such as Eva Street, Knight Street, Pamela Street, Pryce Street and Clarence Street.

== Facilities ==
There are two parks in the area - Gwernifor Park which is based near the Bryn Ifor estate and Victoria Park which is based in the forestry on the eastern side of the village. The village has 2 shops, both newsagents. The main shopping area located in the town is just a short walk away. Primary school education is provided through Darrenlas Primary School. There is a community centre that hosts a weekly youth club. There is also a rugby field in Darranlas - The recreation ground which was home to Mountain Ash RFC for many years but is now used by the community for a range of other purposes. Mountain Ash public library is also located in Knight Street.

== Transport ==
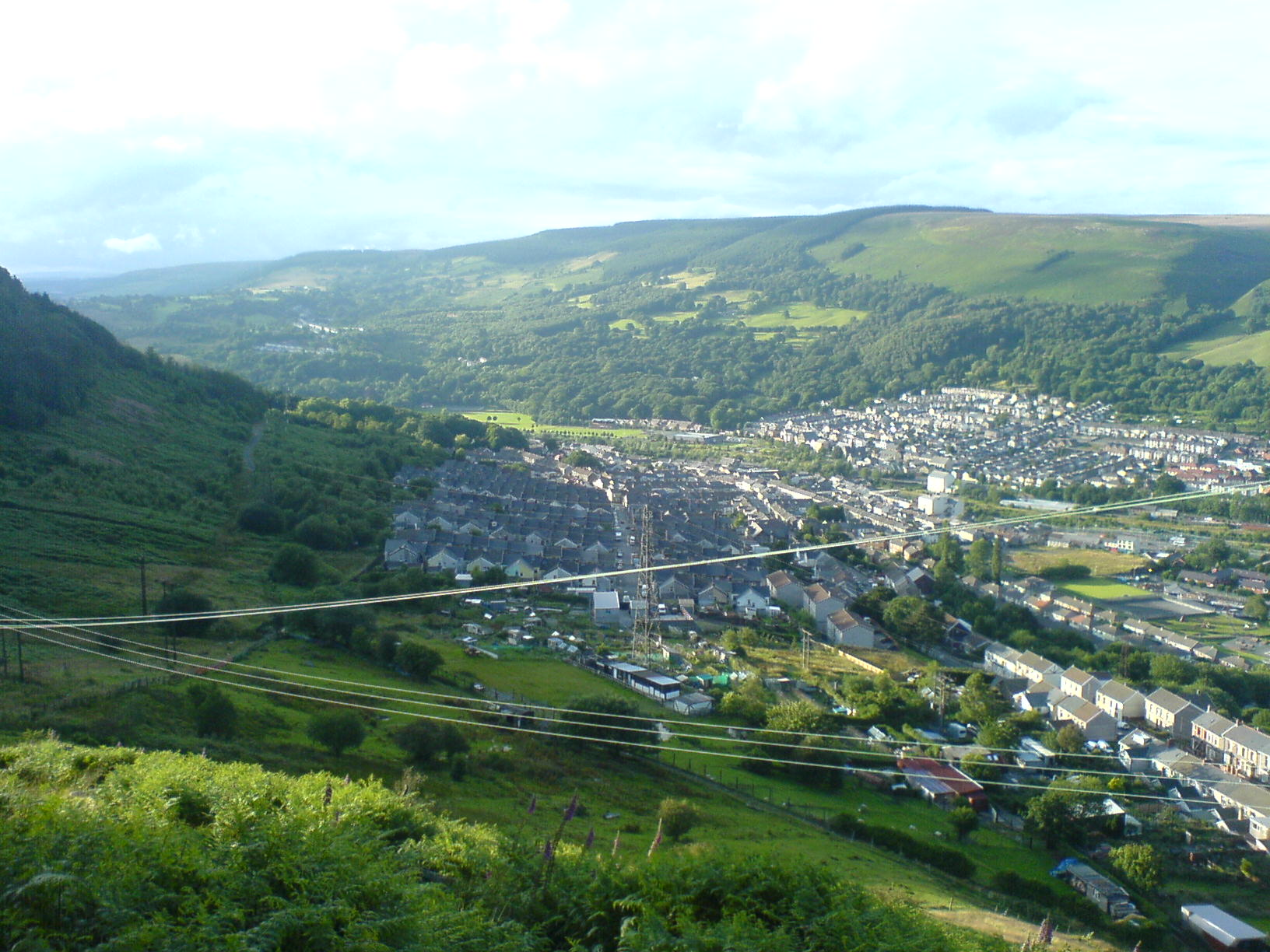
Aerial view of Darranlas taken from Penrhiwcaradog farm.

There is a bus service that runs through Darranlas via Perthcelyn coming down the valley and also comes back up via the town centre. Mountain ash railway station is also located in the town centre.
