= Glenboi =

Coordinates: 51.687°N 3.396°W

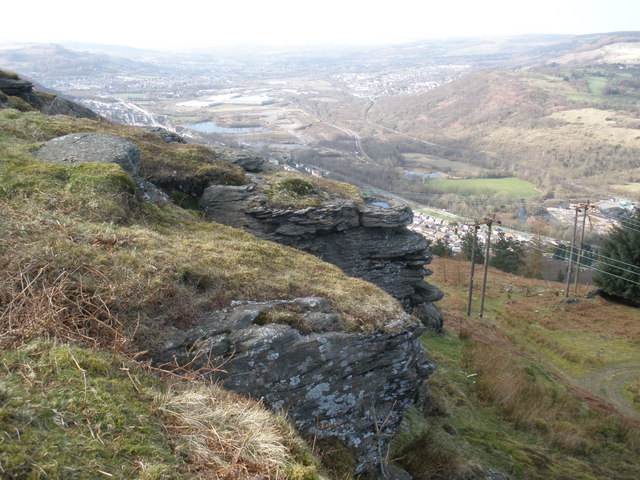

- Location within Rhondda Cynon Taf
- Principal area: Rhondda Cynon Taf
- Preserved county: Mid Glamorgan
- Country: Wales
- Sovereign state: United Kingdom
- Dialling code: 01443
- Police: South Wales
- Fire: South Wales
- Ambulance: Welsh
- UK Parliament: Cynon Valley

Glenboi is a village located one mile north of the town of Mountain Ash in the county borough of Rhondda Cynon Taf, Wales. It is linked to Mountain Ash via the B4275.

The English translation of Glenboi is Wood Valley, "Glen" meaning a "small valley" and "boi" meaning "wood".

Glenboi Primary School was one of thirteen schools in Wales that began experimenting with a longer school day in February 2022 in order to compensate for learning deficits caused by the COVID-19 pandemic.

== Infrastructure ==
The borough council of Rhondda Cynon Taf began a flood alleviation scheme around the Glenboi highway designed to accommodate overflows from surface water and divert streams from entering the Glenboi road and the downstream culvert, an area at high risk of flooding. The Glenboi area was identified as being the 18th highest risk ward in the Rhondda Cynon Taf's flood risk management plan.
