= Cwmpennar =

Coordinates: 51.690955°N 3.3892530°W

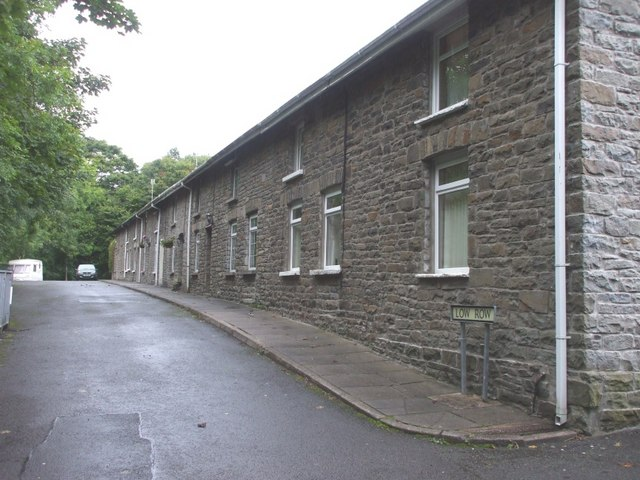

- Location within Rhondda Cynon Taf
- OS grid reference: SO 0407 0005
- Community: Mountain Ash
- Principal area: Rhondda Cynon Taf
- Preserved county: Mid Glamorgan
- Country: Wales
- Sovereign state: United Kingdom
- Post town: MOUNTAIN ASH
- Postcode district: CF45
- Dialling code: 01443
- Police: South Wales
- Fire: South Wales
- Ambulance: Welsh
- UK Parliament: Cynon Valley
- Senedd Cymru – Welsh Parliament: Cynon Valley

Cwmpennar (or Cwm Pennar) is a small village in Mountain Ash which is situated in the Cynon Valley, Rhondda Cynon Taff, Wales.

Cwmpennar lies opposite a former coal mining pit. Cwmpennar is part of the Cefnpennar District Welfare Association (CDWA). On 2 May 1867 an explosion took place at Cwmpennar Pit.
