= Perthcelyn =

Village in Rhondda Cynon Taf, Wales

Coordinates: 51.669378°N 3.367071°W

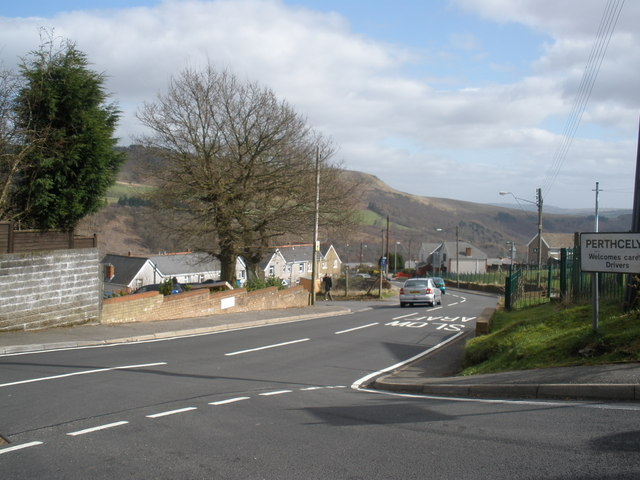
- Approach to Perthcelyn

- Location within Rhondda Cynon Taf
- OS grid reference: ST0555697619
- Principal area: Rhondda Cynon Taf
- Preserved county: Mid Glamorgan
- Country: Wales
- Sovereign state: United Kingdom
- Post town: MOUNTAIN ASH/Aberpennar
- Postcode district: CF45
- Dialling code: 01443
- Police: South Wales
- Fire: South Wales
- Ambulance: Welsh
- UK Parliament: Cynon Valley
- Senedd Cymru – Welsh Parliament: Cynon Valley

Perthcelyn is a village and district of the community between Penrhiwceiber and Mountain Ash within the Cynon Valley in the county borough of Rhondda Cynon Taf, Wales.

Affectionately known as the Lost City, Perthcelyn is at the top of the valley, with views of the Lower Cynon Valley. There are walks and rural paths leading to the Cwm and Ynysbwl. Perthcelyn has two local shops, and a school which opened in 1999 and replaced the old primary school, which is now a Communities First office. The Community centre which opened in 1976 is currently closed and despite attempts to get this re-opened the prospects look bleak with funding an issue.

Employment locally within the village comes mainly from Priory Healthcare who have a nursing home there. Initially owned by Rosenberg and then Creagmoor, the nursing home (known as the Willows) was built in 1992 on the site of Perthcelyn's former public house, the Mount View hotel (known local as Aubreys).

The Post Office was closed in the early 2000s.

== Football club ==
Perthcelyn also has one of the valley's most successful football clubs since 1999. In the first decade of the 21st century, Dean Gore took the Perthcelyn United Youth teams, and won several trophies throughout the Aberdare Valley Football League. In 2009 Gore, along with new manager and former semi-pro footballer Anthony Jenkins, embarked on winning countless trophies with a Senior Men's team. The club reached the South Wales Amateur League in 2011, and they won that title, to take them one step away from the Welsh Football League.

Lack of resources and player commitment meant the club had to drop out of the league and they were re-branded as AFC Perthcelyn. Perthcelyn has continued to win trophies under Mark Anthony, including a local league treble in 2014, and has competed in Cup finals in 2016 and 2017 all in the Aberdare Valley League. In 2017–18, the club changed to Sunday league in the Taff Ely & Rhymney Valley Alliance League for a variety of reasons; but a return to Saturday football in the AVFL came about in the 2019–20 season. The club folded in 2021.

== Geography ==
Perthcelyn is located on the hillside above Penrhiwceiber, with the village being bounded by Penrhiwceiber to the north and east, and by Tyntetown to the south. Local facilities include 'Perthcelyn Primary School', 'Perthcelyn Infant School' and 'Perthcelyn Community Centre'. Historically Penrhiwceiber Colliery was located nearby on the outskirts of the village.

== Gallery ==
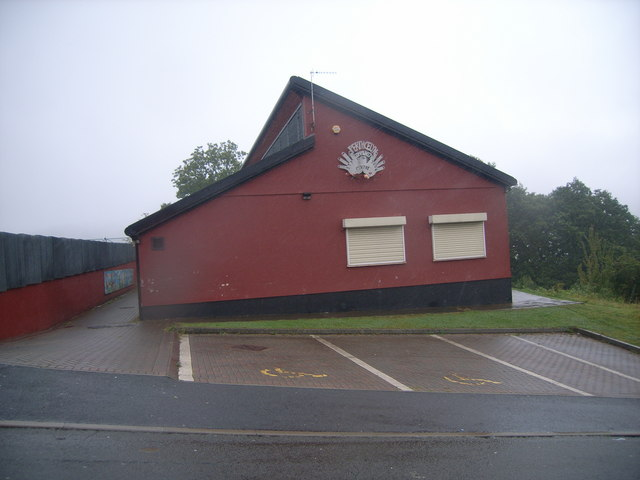
Perthcelyn Community Centre

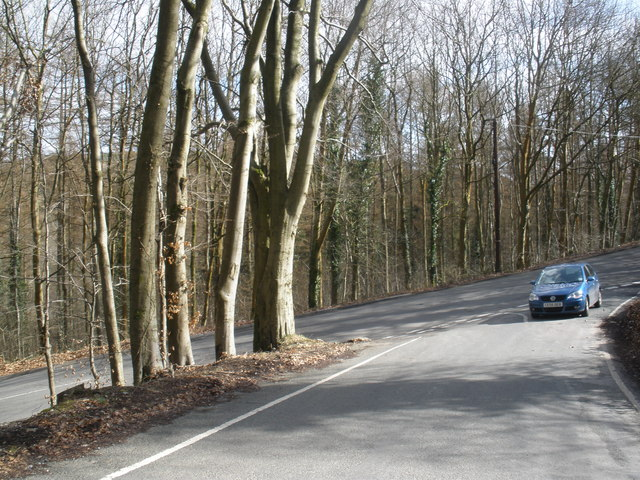
View above Perthcelyn

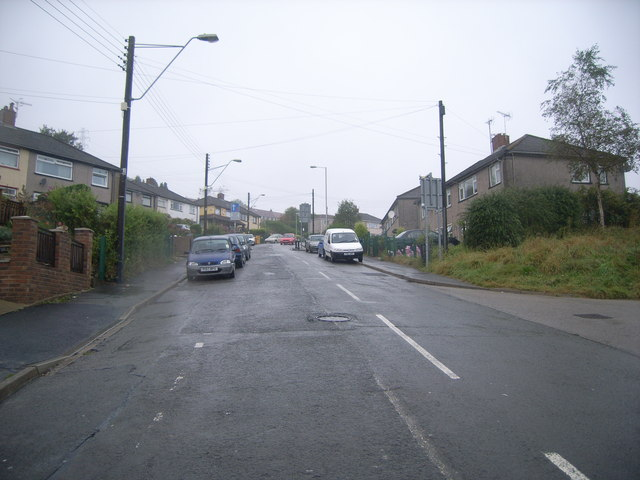
View towards Perthcelyn
