= Mountain Ash, Rhondda Cynon Taf =

Town in Cynon Valley, Wales

Coordinates: 51.68139°N 3.37916°W

Mountain Ash: Welsh: Aberpennar
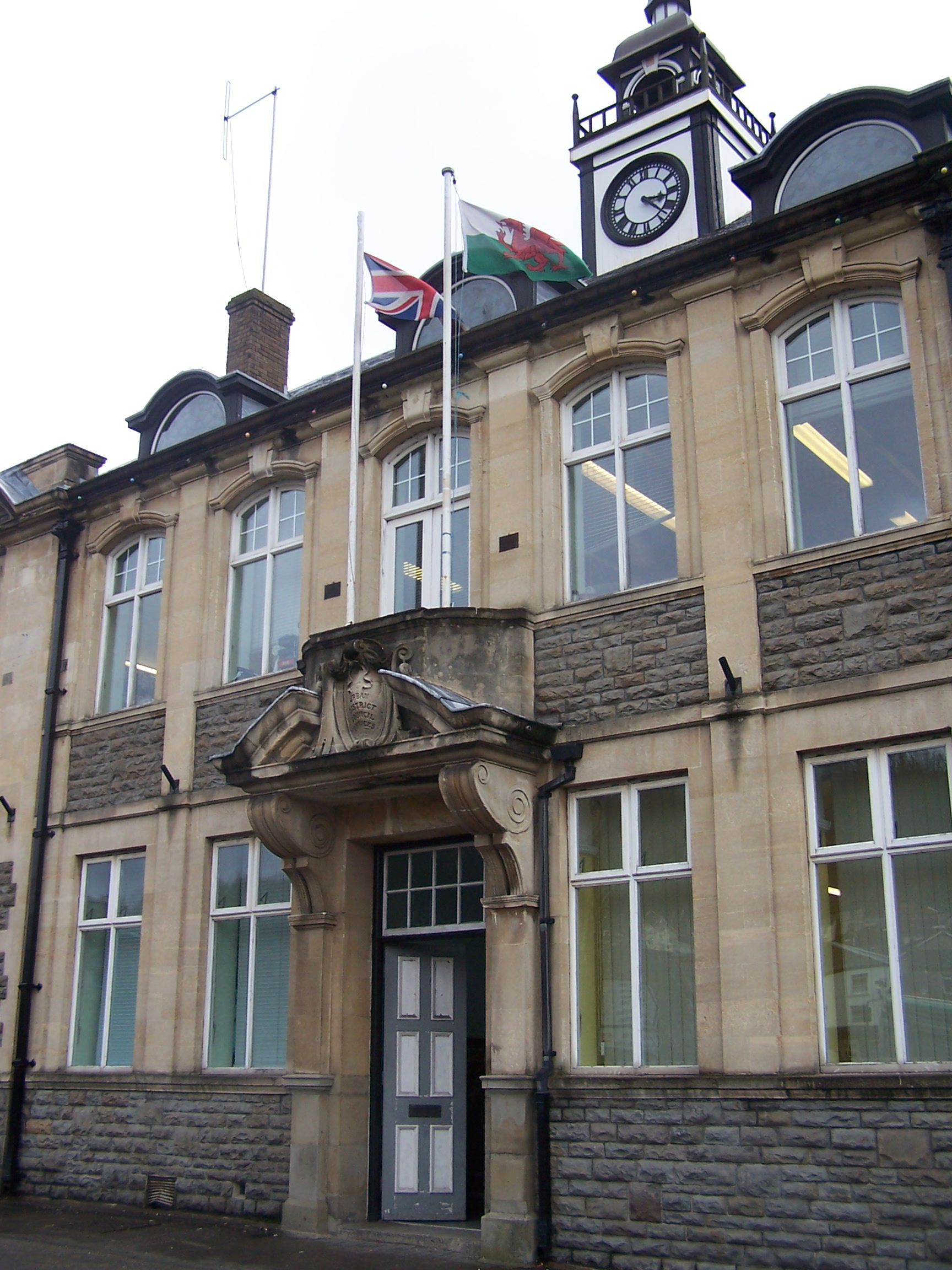
- Mountain Ash Town Hall

- Location within Rhondda Cynon Taf
- Population: 11,230 (2011)
- OS grid reference: ST025915
- Community: Mountain Ash East Mountain Ash West
- Principal area: Rhondda Cynon Taf
- Preserved county: Mid Glamorgan
- Country: Wales
- Sovereign state: United Kingdom
- Post town: MOUNTAIN ASH
- Postcode district: CF45
- Dialling code: 01443
- Police: South Wales
- Fire: South Wales
- Ambulance: Welsh
- UK Parliament: Pontypridd
- Senedd Cymru – Welsh Parliament: Cynon Valley

Mountain Ash (Welsh: Aberpennar) is a town and former community in the Cynon Valley, within the County Borough of Rhondda Cynon Taf, Wales, with a population of 11,230 at the 2011 Census, estimated in 2019 at 11,339. It includes the districts and villages of Cefnpennar, Cwmpennar, Caegarw, Darranlas, Fernhill, Glenboi and Newtown, all within the historic county boundaries of Glamorgan. Aberdare lies about 4.5 miles (7.2 km) north-west, Cardiff 19 miles (31 km) south-east, and Penrhiwceiber a mile to the south-east. It divides into two communities (civil parishes): West covers the town centre and the districts of Miskin, Darranlas, Fernhill and Glenboi, and East the districts of Cefnpennar, Cwmpennar, Caegarw and Newtown.

== Etymology ==
Before the establishment of a village in the early 19th century the landscape was identified by a variety of Welsh toponyms. The name Aberpennar ("Mouth of the river Pennar") is recorded as early as 1570 as Aber Pennarthe, in 1600 as Aberpennarth and by 1638 as Tir Aber Penarth. By the turn of the 18th century another toponym, Dyffryn (Valley or lowland between hills) seems to have gained prominence. While the Bruce family mansion was originally named Aberpennar, the house is listed as Aberpennar alias Dyffryn by 1691 and Dyffrin alias Aberpennar in 1717, before taking the sole name Duffryn when it was rebuilt in the mid-18th century. Contemporary tithe maps show that the early village is named Dyffryn, despite the river mouth being in its immediate vicinity.

The town takes its English name from the Mountain Ash Inn, which was opened around 1809 on the old Aberdare Road. Thomas Morgan states that the land owner, John Bruce Pryce leased this land to a man named David John Rhys, for the building of a public house. When Pryce asked Rhys for the name of the new building, Rhys noticed a lone "Cerdinen" (the Welsh name for a mountain ash tree, or rowan, common to the area) near by. Rhys then replied to Pryce, "We shall call this place Mountain Ash".

The inn became a local landmark and was well known to English and Welsh speakers travelling through the area. By the 1830s, the name Mountain Ash was adopted as a name for the industrial village. Although both Aberpennar and Duffryn had continued usage in various forms, notably for roads, canals, hotels, railways and collieries. As late as 1864, when the Great Western Railway opened Mountain Ash railway station, the name "Middle Duffryn" was originally chosen over Mountain Ash. Writing in 1887, Morgan differentiates Aberpennar as the town's "ancient name" and Mountain Ash as its "present name". Other late 19th century writers such as David Watkin Jones also used the name Mountain Ash even when writing exclusively in Welsh. William "Glanffrwd" Thomas explicitly states that the predominantly Welsh-speaking townsfolk do not use a Welsh name.

The issue of the town's Welsh name was resolved when the National Eisteddfod was held at the grounds of Dyffryn House in 1905. In the previous year, the Eisteddfod was announced in the Aberdare Leader with the publication of a Penillion Telyn (lyrics for harp) by the poet Watkin Wyn. In the piece, the poet called on the Welsh people to consider the area's ancient names and specifically called for Mountain Ash to be replaced with Aberpennar. Such was the popularity of the event and its competitors with the town's general population, that the name Aberpennar was widely taken up by the town's majority Welsh-speaking population and finally adopted as the official Welsh name.

== History ==
Like the rest of the Cynon Valley, Mountain Ash continued to be predominantly Welsh-speaking well into the 20th century. Unlike others in the South Wales valleys, the village was undisturbed until the construction of the Aberdare Canal in 1818. This became disused in the early 1920s and was filled in as New Cardiff Road in 1933.

The population of 1,614 in 1841 rose to 11,463 in 1871 as local collieries opened. The 1851 census shows the construction of Duffryn Street and Navigation Street. By 1859 there were 12 public houses, among the earliest being the Bruce Arms, the Junction Inn and the New Inn. By 1920, Kelly's Directory listed over 200 businesses in the village.

The coal industry began to decline after the First World War, but after the Second, manufacturing was introduced to offset the serious fall in local employment. By the end of the 20th century the last mines had closed and so had many of the factories. The economic hardships were mitigated partly by new light industry and service activities.

== Religion ==
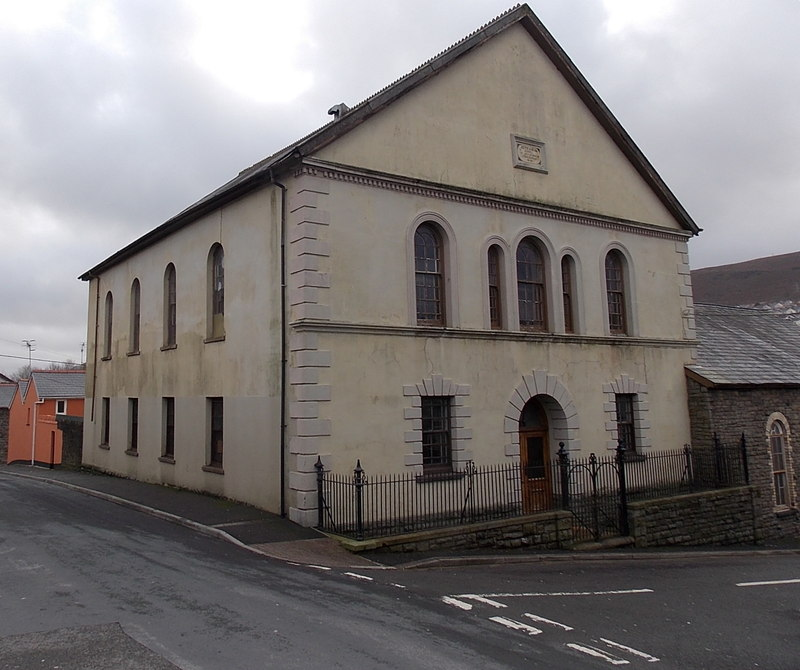
Bethania Chapel

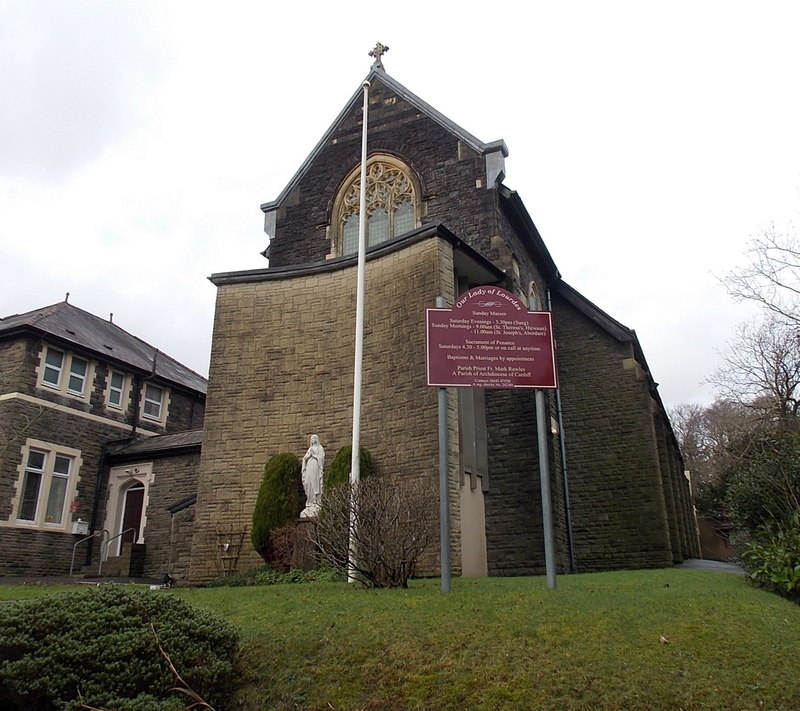
The Roman Catholic church of Our Lady of Lourdes

Mountain Ash had numerous nonconformist chapels, of which only one Welsh-language chapel remains: Bethania (Independent). Bethlehem (Calvinistic Methodist) closed, as did an Independent chapel at Bethel, Miskin.

Like other communities in the Cynon Valley, Mountain Ash was affected by the Religious Revival of 1904–1905. One event on a Friday evening in late January came when a procession paraded through the main streets before a revivalist meeting at Bethania Chapel addressed by the Rev. Penar Griffiths.

== Governance ==
An electoral ward of Mountain Ash was created, effective from the 2022 local elections, which combined the former wards of Mountain Ash East and Mountain Ash West. The ward elects two councillors to Rhondda Cynon Taf County Borough Council.

Mountain Ash originally straddled the parishes of Aberdare and Llanwonno. An ecclesiastical parish for Mountain Ash was created in 1863 covering parts of those two civil parishes, with the recently built St Margaret's Church as the new parish church. A local government district was established in 1867 to run the growing town, governed by the Mountain Ash Local Board. By 1894 the local government district had been enlarged to cover parts of the civil parishes of Aberdare, Llanwonno, and Llanfabon. Under the Local Government Act 1894 the local board was reconstituted as an urban district council, and at the same time the parish boundaries were adjusted so that the parish of Llanwonno matched the Mountain Ash Urban District. The council went on to build Mountain Ash Town Hall, completed in 1904, to serve as its offices and meeting place.

Mountain Ash Urban District was abolished in 1974 under the Local Government Act 1972. The area became part of the borough of Cynon Valley within the new county of Mid Glamorgan. The area of the former urban district was made a community, later being subdivided in 1982 into four communities: Abercynon, Penrhiwceiber, Ynysybwl, and a smaller Mountain Ash community. The Mountain Ash community was further divided in 2017 into two communities called Mountain Ash East and Mountain Ash West. No community council exists for either of the Mountain Ash communities.

Cynon Valley Borough Council and Mid Glamorgan County Council were both abolished in 1996, since when Mountain Ash has been governed by Rhondda Cynon Taf County Borough Council.

== Transport ==
The town is served by Mountain Ash railway station on the Aberdare branch of the Merthyr Line of the Transport for Wales Rail network. The village of Fernhill and Penrhiwceiber is also served by the Aberdare line. Bus services are operated by Stagecoach in South Wales.

=== NCB Mountain Ash Railway ===
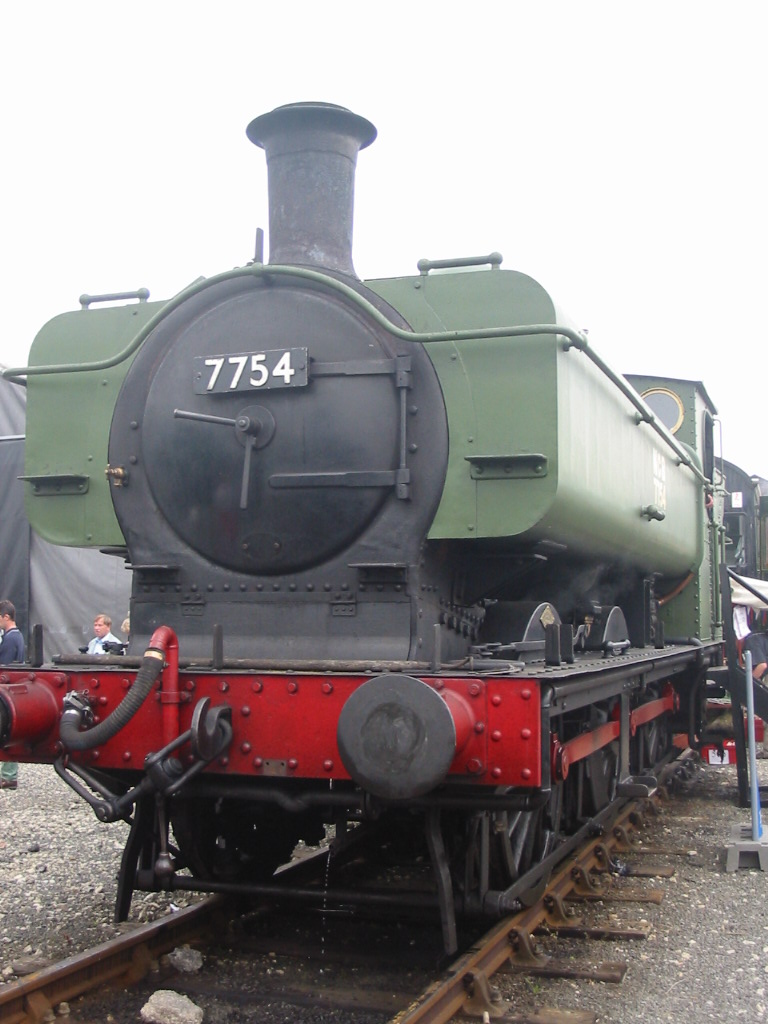
The ex-GWR Pannier Tank No.7754, in preservation at the Llangollen Railway. Through operating on the NCB Mountain Ash railway, it became the last British mainline-built operating steam locomotive in the UK, until it ceased operations in 1975.

An early British railway line had developed from the industrial development within the South Wales Valleys, which with its core around Mountain Ash became known as the Mountain Ash Railway (MAR). Having developed from an early tramway, it became in the 1970s the last steam-hauled line in the UK. Developed by Powell Duffryn as it consolidated various industrial assets, the railway started from Afon Cynon at the Penrikyber Colliery, headed north past a coal-stocking area at Pontcynon, then past an interchange yard known as Lansdale Yard, and through the former Nixon's Navigation colliery – home of the railway's central workshops, locomotive sheds and weighbridge – and on north past Duffryn Colliery, terminating at the Abercwmboi Phurnacite plant. The railway's main access to the UK rail network was at the Vale of Neath Railway's station at Mountain Ash (Cardiff Road) railway station, but it also had access to the competing, dominant Taff Vale Railway.

Early locomotives were drawn from all major UK industrial locomotive makers, but like many industrial railways after World War Two, the operational fleet was based on a core of group of Hunslet Austerity 0-6-0STs. In 1959 the National Coal Board (NCB) acquired the ex-GWR Pannier Tank No. 7754. Although rather too heavy to work on the relatively light rail of the MAR, whose poor maintenance resulted in regular spreading of the rails, it became a favourite with MAR crews after a refit in the late 1960s. It eventually became the last British mainline-built operating steam locomotive in the UK, until 1975 after a cylinder-valve crack. The NCB were persuaded to donate the locomotive to National Museum Wales, which has since loaned it indefinitely to the Llangollen Railway. The MAR closed in the mid-1980s after the miners' strike.

== Education ==
Mountain Ash Comprehensive School caters for pupils aged 11–18, on the site of the former estate of Lord Aberdare. The main Dyffryn House was used by the school until its demolition in the 1990s. Opposite the site is the hospital, Ysbyty Cwm Cynon that replaced the Mountain Ash General Hospital in 2012.

Local primary schools include Our Lady's RC Primary School, Caegarw Primary School (Ysgol Gynradd Caegarw), Glenboi Primary School (Ysgol Gynradd Glen-boi), Darranlas Primary School (Ysgol Gynradd Darren-las), Miskin Primary School (Ysgol Gynradd Meisgyn), Pengeulan Primary School (Ysgol Gynradd Pengeulan) and Penrhiwceiber Primary School (Ysgol Gynradd Penrhiwceibr).

== Sport and culture ==
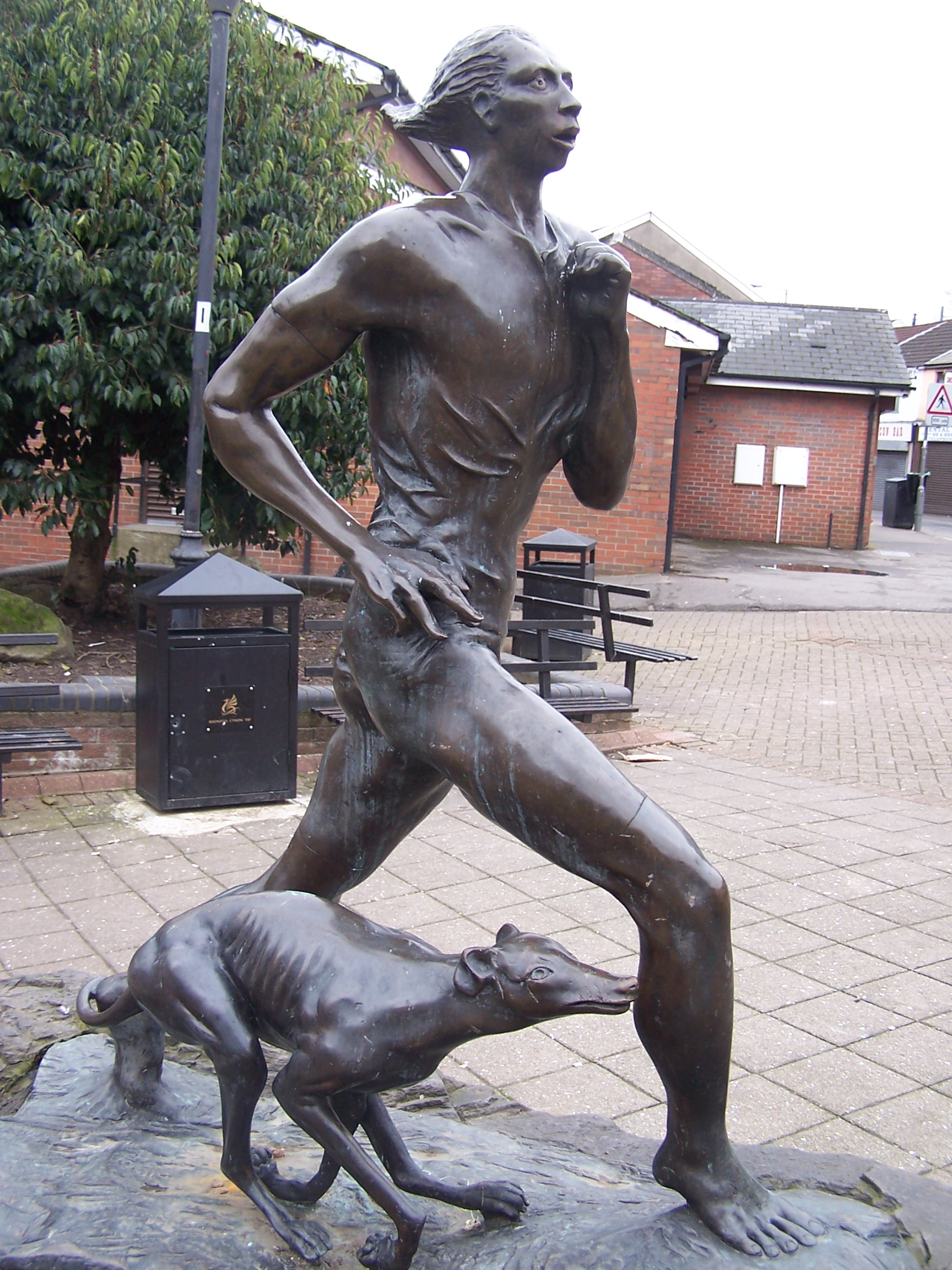
Guto Nyth Brân statue, Oxford Street

Mountain Ash has a rugby union team, Mountain Ash RFC. The Rugby league club South Wales Scorpions played its home matches in Mountain Ash in the 2014-15 season.

Nos Galan road race (Welsh: Rasys Enwog Nos Galan) is an annual 5 kilometres (3.1 mi) road running race, run on New Year's Eve (Nos Galan) to commemorate the first race of Guto Nyth Bran. Started in 1958, it now attracts 800+ runners and 10,000 people to the associated street entertainment.

The town also had an association football club, Tynte Rovers until it folded in 2019.

In 1974, Mountain Ash RFC Singers is a male-voice choir formed from a group of ex-players. Mountain Ash hosted the National Eisteddfod in 1905 and 1946.

Mountain Ash served as inspiration for the fictional town of Aberowen in Fall of Giants and the rest of the Century Trilogy written by Ken Follett. The town also appears in the Danny Wallace's 2005 memoir Yes Man.

The town is home to Cynon Valley Indoor Bowls club, situated near the rugby fields. The indoor club had produced a number of welsh international standard players at both junior and senior level.

== Notable people ==
See also Category:People from Mountain Ash, Wales

- Mark Brake (born 1958), author, broadcaster and communicator of science
- Guto Nyth Brân (1700–1737), legendary Welsh athlete, once reputed to be the fastest man on earth
- Howard Collins (born 1949), karate instructor
- Pennar Davies (1911–1996), Congregational minister and author
- Brian Juliff (born 1952), dual-code rugby footballer
- Stuart Manley (born 1979), professional golfer
- Elaine Morgan (1920–2013), BAFTA award-winning author
- Haydn Morris (born 1928), international rugby union wing three-quarter
- Harri Webb (1920–1994), poet and librarian
- Richard "Dickie" Williams (1925–1997), rugby league footballer
- Duane Jones (snooker player), professional snooker player
- Ross Owen, Welsh International Bowls Player & World Champion
