= Penrhiwceiber =

Village and community in Wales

Penrhiwceiber: Welsh: Penrhiw-ceibr
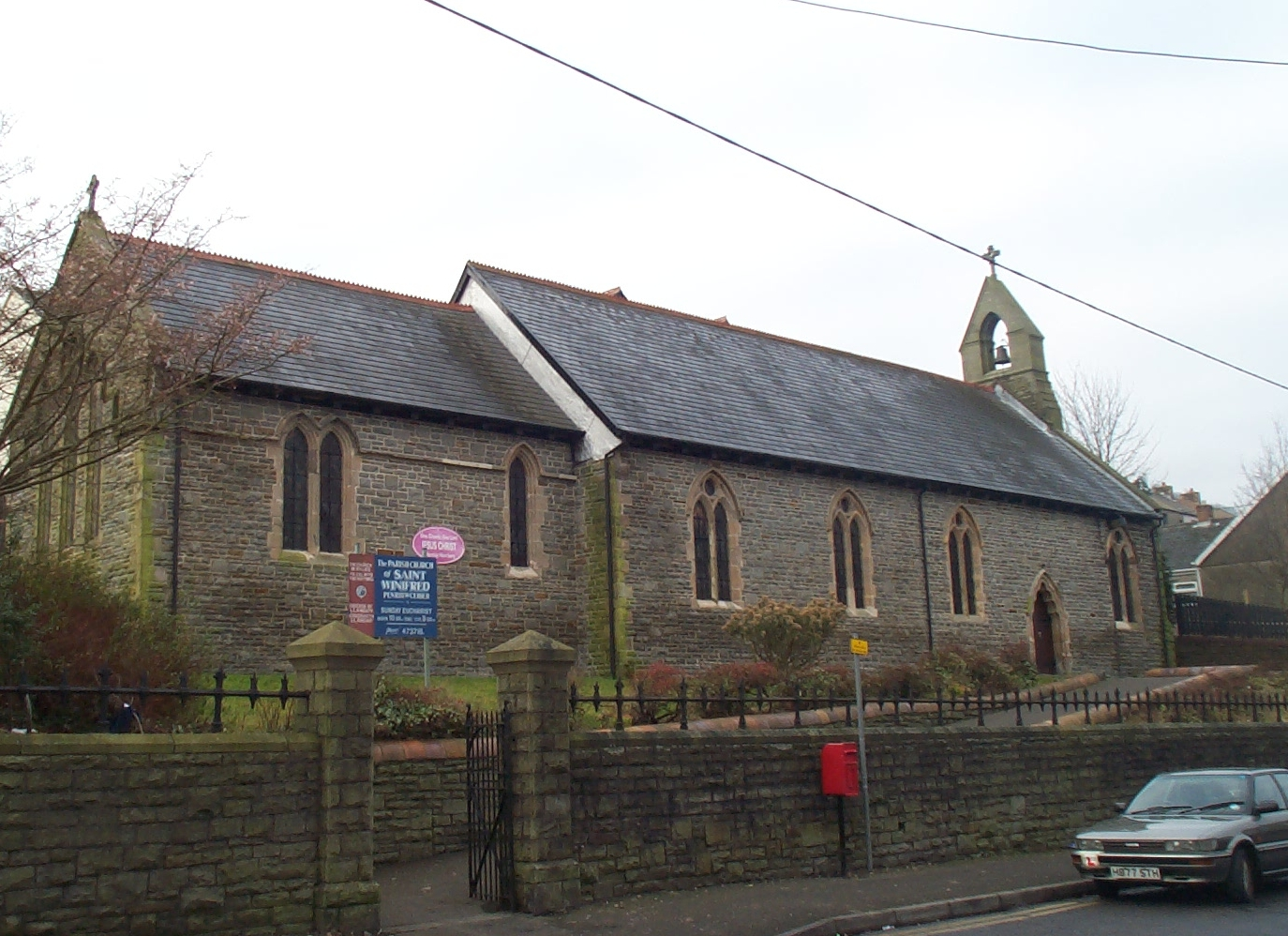
- St Winifred's Church

- Location within Rhondda Cynon Taf
- Population: 6,789 (2011)
- OS grid reference: ST0597
- Community: Penrhiw-ceiber
- Principal area: Rhondda Cynon Taf
- Preserved county: Mid Glamorgan
- Country: Wales
- Sovereign state: United Kingdom
- Post town: Mountain Ash/Aberpennar
- Postcode district: CF45
- Dialling code: 01443
- Police: South Wales
- Fire: South Wales
- Ambulance: Welsh
- UK Parliament: Pontypridd
- Senedd Cymru – Welsh Parliament: Pontypridd Cynon Merthyr
- List of places UK Wales Rhondda Cynon Taf 51.670°N 3.361°W Community map: Map of the community

Penrhiwceiber (Welsh: Penrhiw-ceibr) is a village and community (and electoral ward, spelt Penrhiw-ceibr) in the county borough of Rhondda Cynon Taf, Wales, that lies south of the town Aberpennar and north of the village of Tyntetown, and is one of many villages that lies within the Cynon Valley. Prior to 1870 the area was heavy woodland, but the opening of the Penrhiwceiber Colliery in 1878 saw its rapid expansion into a thriving village.

== Etymology ==
Penrhiwceiber, according to Thomas Morgan in his 1887 publication, should be worded as Pen-Rhiw-Cae-Byr - 'Top of the hill of the little field'. Other thoughts refer to the word ceiber, which means joist, beam or rafter and may suggest a place where timber was plentiful, which would certainly describe the area, which was a heavy woodland, before the coming of the coal trade.

== History ==
Penrhiwceiber was once a heavily wooded area with steep sloping mountainsides up until the last 20 years of the 19th century. According to the 1871 Census Records the village of Penrhiwceiber is not listed, however in 1881 the Census lists a number of streets within the village of Penrhiwceiber, notably Railway Terrace, Cynon Terrace, Glanlay Street and Penrhiwceiber Road. This rapid growth was connected to the burgeoning coal trade and the construction of the Penrikyber Colliery in 1878. The sinking of the colliery was first attempted in 1872 by a Mr. Thomas of Cwmbach on behalf of a group of businessmen who set themselves up as the Penrhiwceiber Navigation Collieries Company. After facing problems such as running water and soft sand beds, the first commercial coal was raised from the mine in 1879, though the pit was serviced by a simple wooden headgear with a single rope. Growth was rapid, and in an 1896 report by the Inspector of Mines, the colliery was employing 1,463 men. By 1908, that number was close to 1,800. In 1909 the colliery suffered a pit fire which saw the lives of 30 men saved by the actions of the fire brigade. There was one fatality.

The school primary school in the area is Penrhiwceibr Primary School (Welsh: Ysgol Gynradd Penrhiwceibr) which was originally built in 1881 and which provides further evidence as to the rapid growth of the village, with its having to be enlarged in 1893, 1895 and 1901.

This growth was to continue into the 20th century until in 1920 the Kelly's Trade Directory was able to list over one hundred commercial properties for Penrhiwceiber, as well as railway stations (Penrhiwceiber railway station) on both the Great Western and Taff Vale railways, religious buildings including Carmel Chapel (1880), Moriah Chapel, Bethel Eglwys-y-Wesleyaid (1884), Saint Winifred's Church (Welsh: Eglwys Santes Gwenffrewi) (1883), and the Penrhiwceiber Workmen's Hall and Institute (Welsh: Neuadd a Sefydliad y Gweithwyr Penrhiwceibr) built in 1888.

In Penrhiwceiber there is a clock tower memorial that was erected in memory of those who died while serving in World War I, World War II and the Korean War.

Penrhiwceiber Workmen's Hall and Institute (Welsh: Sefydliad a Neuadd y Gweithwyr Penrhiwceibr) was opened in the village in 1888 and restored in 1992. It remains one of the most prominent landmarks in the village. The former public library, on Rheola Street, closed in 2014.

== Coal mining ==
Penrhiwceiber was an important area for coal mining for the first half of the 20th century, it was home to two Coal Mines, which were:

- Penrhiwceibr Colliery - Begun in 1872 by a Mr. Thomas of Cwmbach, at one point in 1923 there were over 2200 employees, but Penrhiwceiber Colliery closed on 8 October 1985.
- Cwm Cynon Colliery - Begun in 1889 it closed in 1949, in 1945 there were 644 people employed there. At its peak there were 1950 people working there.

Where Penrhiwceiber Colliery once sat, is now a local park and football and rugby fields which is locally known as Glasbrook Field. Where the Cwm Cynon Colliery once sat is now an industrial park and an industrial estate with few factories known as Parc Busnes Cwm Cynon (English: Cwm Cynon Business Park) and the Ystad Ddiwydiannol Cwm Cynon (English: Cwm Cynon Industrial Estate).

== Religion ==
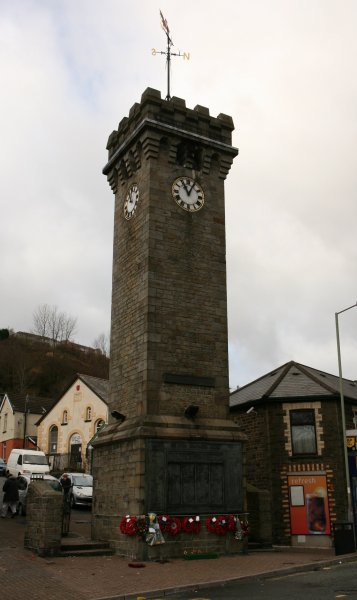
War Memorial and Clock Tower

Penrhiwceiber falls within the historic Parish of Llanwynno, Church in Wales. The local St Winifred's Church (Welsh: Eglwys Santes Gwenffrewi) was built in 1883.

The other church, All Saints (Tyntetown), was built in 1903 to serve the two communities of Tyntetown and Ynysboeth. Originally a daughter church of Penrhiwceiber, it became an independent parish fairly early on, before rejoining Penrhiwceiber in 1972. There used to be a Salvation Army corps in the village.

There were a number of nonconformist chapels at Penrhiwceiber including Jerusalem (Baptist), Carmel (Independent) and Hermon (Calvinistic Methodist).

Penrhiwceiber is home to Cylch Meithrin Penrhiwceiber which is a Welsh language pre-school for local children. Penrhiwceiber is generally known as "Ceiber" to the locals. To the east of the village lies Mynydd Twyn Brynbychan which is around 1,500 ft above sea level, the village is one of the steepest in Wales, and possibly the United Kingdom. The community and electoral ward of Penrhiwceiber includes both the village itself as well as the districts of Perthcelyn and Miskin.

== Governance ==
Penrhiw-ceibr (formerly Penrhiwceiber) is the name of the electoral ward which is coterminous with the community. The ward elects two county councillors to Rhondda Cynon Taf County Borough Council. The ward has been represented since 1995 by both Labour Party and Plaid Cymru councillors, though both councillors were from Labour between 2004 and 2017.

In a surprise result at the May 2017 council elections, veteran Labour councillor Jane Ward lost her seat to Gavin Williams, of the new Cynon Valley Party.
