= Fernhill, Rhondda Cynon Taf =

Coordinates: 51.690814°N 3.410555°W

Fernhill
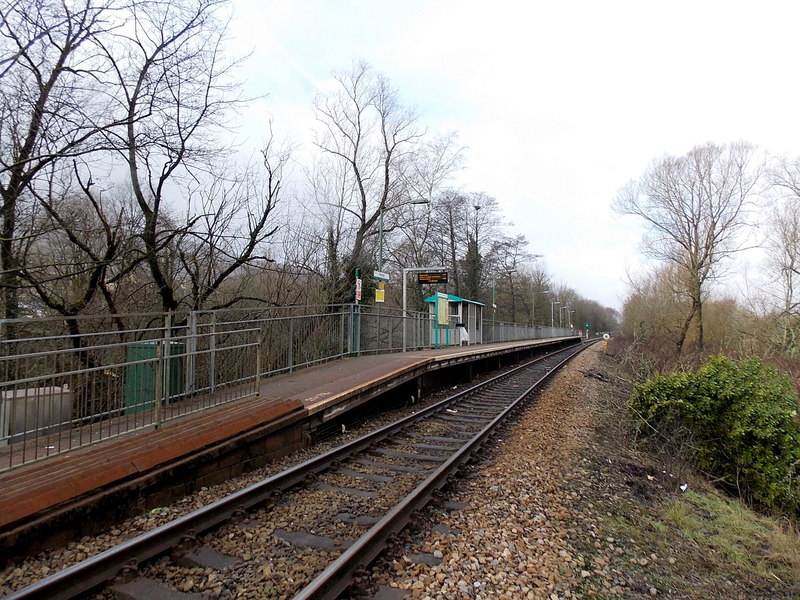

- Location within Rhondda Cynon Taf
- OS grid reference: SO025000
- Principal area: Rhondda Cynon Taf
- Preserved county: Mid Glamorgan
- Country: Wales
- Sovereign state: United Kingdom
- Post town: MOUNTAIN ASH
- Postcode district: CF45
- Dialling code: 01443
- Police: South Wales
- Fire: South Wales
- Ambulance: Welsh
- UK Parliament: Pontypridd
- Senedd Cymru – Welsh Parliament: Cynon Valley

Fernhill is a village near Mountain Ash in Rhondda Cynon Taf, Wales.

The village is served by Fernhill railway station on the Merthyr Line - Aberdare branch.
