= Cefnpennar =

Coordinates: 51.697°N 3.394°W

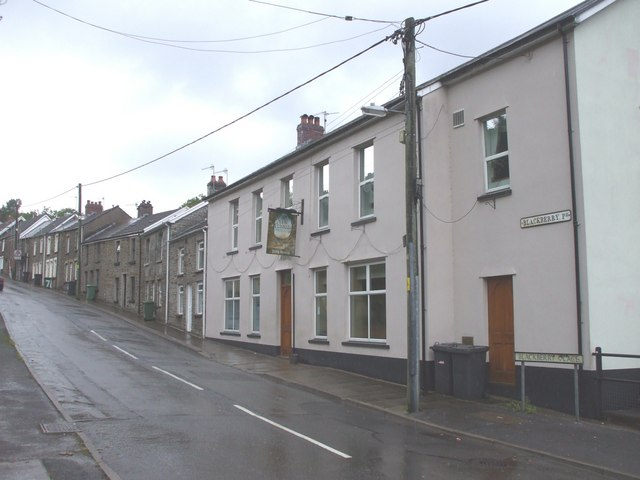

- Location within Rhondda Cynon Taf
- OS grid reference: SO037007
- Principal area: Rhondda Cynon Taf
- Preserved county: Mid Glamorgan
- Country: Wales
- Sovereign state: United Kingdom
- Post town: Mountain Ash
- Postcode district: CF45
- Dialling code: 01443
- Police: South Wales
- Fire: South Wales
- Ambulance: Welsh
- UK Parliament: Cynon Valley
- Senedd Cymru – Welsh Parliament: Cynon Valley

Cefnpennar also known as Cefn Pennar is a small rural hamlet north of the coal mining town of Mountain Ash, Rhondda Cynon Taff, in Wales. The village that has been in existence since at least 1870 is still part of the Aberdare, Rhondda Cynon Taff Parish. It is approximately 1 mile from Mountain Ash town centre and buses run daily (every 30 minutes according to DirectTransport.co.uk 2013). It has a number of streets including: Blackberry Place, Cefnpennar Road, Greenfield Terrace, Llwynbedw, The Avenue & Toncoch Terrace .

== Facilities ==
Cefnpennar has its own golf course named: Mountain Ash Golf Club (Welsh: Clwb Golff Aberpennar) as well as a children's playground and near opposite of which are a pair of bottle recycling banks. Much of the housing in the area are two to three bedroomed properties.

The nearest schools are Glenboi Primary School in Fernhill (1.2 km), Caegarw Primary School (1.8 km) for primary education, and Mountain Ash Comprehensive school (1 km) for secondary education.

The nearest hospital is Ysbyty Cwm Cynon just over 1 km away......

The nearest train station is Fernhill just over 1 km away.

Cefnpennar benefits from the Cefnpennar & District Welfare Association which maintains a significant presence in the area.

== Geography ==
The village is in the Cynon valley of the South Wales Valleys and as such the nearest river is the Cynon river with the Nant Pennar tributary running through the village. It is reported to be at least one mile above sea level with low levels of light pollution.

It is surrounded on all sides by deciduous or mixed woodland.
