= Purple Plaques =

Welsh commemoration scheme

The Purple Plaques (Welsh: Placiau Porffor) scheme in Wales, UK aims to install plaques on buildings to increase recognition of the lives of women who have had a significant and long-lasting impact associated with Wales.

The scheme was initiated by several members of the National Assembly for Wales, led by Julie Morgan, Member of the Senedd for Cardiff North. The purple colour was chosen because of its association with the women's suffrage movement. The scheme was initially organised in partnership with the gender equality charity Chwarae Teg, (Fair Play) and subsequently became an independent charity.

It was launched on 8 March 2017 (International Women's Day) with the aim of installing the first plaque on the Senedd building to commemorate Val Feld. The plaques are glazed purple ceramic with white lettering. Subsequently, one to three plaques have been installed each year.

Criteria for a plaque include that the person must be a deceased woman with strong links to Wales, and that she must have made a remarkable contribution in Wales or beyond. The extent of her impact on women, including as a role model, will also be considered, as well as whether she has already been commemorated. In addition to those who are already well known but may not yet be commemorated publicly, the scheme especially aims to recognise women who have previously not been recognised. Practical considerations such as a need for planning permission will also be considered.

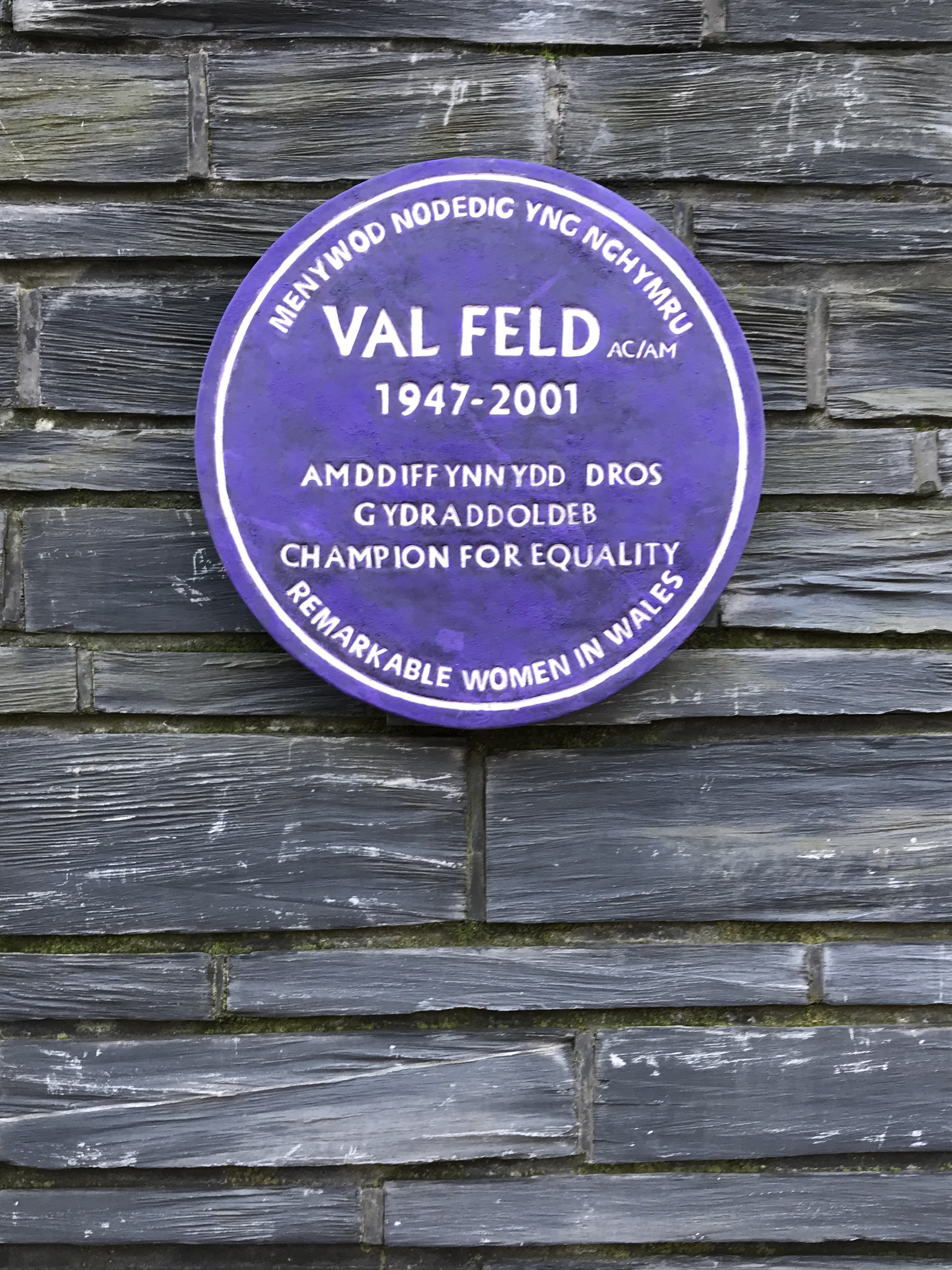
Val Feld plaque at The Senedd

== Plaques installed ==
As of October 2026, 27 purple plaques have been installed to mark the following:

- Val Feld, installed on Senedd building 2018. One of the architects of devolution for Wales; Director and founder of Shelter Cymru; activist for social and gender equality.
- Ursula Masson, installed on Merthyr Tydfil Central Library 2019. Academic specialising in women’s history and feminism; founded Centre for Gender Studies in Wales at University of South Wales.
- Megan Lloyd George, installed on her family's home in Criccieth 2019. First woman MP for a Welsh constituency.
- Angela Kwok, installed on her family's take-away in Pontcanna 2020. Champion of isolated Chinese people in south Wales.
- Eunice Stallard, installed on the Miners Welfare Hall, Ystradgynlais 2020. Peace campaigner and political activist.
- Martha Gellhorn, installed on her retirement cottage in Devauden 2021. American war correspondent, novelist, travel writer, and journalist.
- Charlotte Price White, installed on her family home in Bangor 2021. Suffragist and politician.
- Dinah Williams, installed on a cow byre at her home in Borth, Ceredigion, 2021. Pioneering woman organic farmer and entrepreneur.
- Eirene White, Baroness White on Flint Town Hall in June 2022. She was one of the first three women to represent Wales in the UK Parliament, and indeed Wales's only female MP for ten years.
- Thora Silverthorne in 2022 in Abertillery; international brigader, trade unionist and nurse.
- Frances Hoggan on 3 March 2023 at her birthplace in Brecon; campaigner, social reformer and the first female doctor to be registered in Wales.
- Patti Flynn, installed in the Wales Millennium Centre on 24 March 2023 in her home town of Cardiff: singer and black rights activist.
- Rose Davies, councillor and campaigner.
- Annie Jane Hughes Griffiths was a peace campaigner.
- Jemima Nicholas helped prevent an invasion of Britain by French troops at Fishguard in the 18th century.
- Dorothy Miles was a poet and activist in the deaf community.
- Bernice Rubens was a novelist who was awarded the Booker Prize in 1970.
- Minnie Pallister, a political activist, peace campaigner, writer and feminist.
- Amy Dillwyn, novelist, businesswoman, and social benefactor.
- Agnes Davies, British snooker champion and billiards player. Purple plaque installed in Saron village, near Ammanford, Carmarthenshire.
- Ethel May Hovey, suffragist, councillor, mayor; campaigner for maternity care, pensions and housing and advocate for women's education. Purple Plaque installed at the site where the Nant y Glyn maternity home used to be.
- Irene Steer, first Welsh woman to win an Olympic gold medal (1912, 4x100m freestyle relay)
- Mollie Phillips Olympic figure skater and judge
- Beatrice Lewis, Social reformer who improved life for women in Barry dockland
- Mabel Wulff, who followed her deported husband from Newport to Germany after the First World War, and, as caretaker of the English church in Hamburg, protected it during the Second World War.
- Nansi Williams who protected 5 children during the Aberfan disaster, allowing them to survive at the cost of her own life
- Mary Lloyd Wynne, installed in St Michael's churchyard, Betws-yn-Rhos. Mycologist after whom several species were named.
