= Nansi (name) =

Nansi is a given name and surname. Notable people with the name include:

== Given name ==
- Nansi Karaboycheva (born 1993), Bulgarian model
- Nansi Richards (1888–1979), Welsh harpist
- Nansi Tireli (born 1965), Croatian entrepreneur and politician
- Nansi Williams (1922–1966), Welsh dinner lady

== Surname ==
- Pooja Nansi (born 1981), Singaporean poet, musician, and educator
