= Dai Beynon =

Welsh teacher

David 'Dai' Beynon
- Born: 1919; Wales
- Died: 21 October 1966; Aberfan, Wales
- Occupations: Rugby player, teacher
- Known for: One of the heroes of the Aberfan disaster

David "Dai" Beynon (1919 – 21 October 1966) was the deputy head of Pantglas Junior School in Aberfan, Wales. He is known in Wales and throughout the UK as one of the heroes of the Aberfan disaster of 1966, dying in the disaster as he attempted to shield the children in his class.

== Personal life ==
Beynon was married to Vera and they had one son, Philip (b 1953).

Beynon studied at Bangor University, where he played in goal for Bangor City F.C. He also played back row forward for Pontypridd rugby club in his youth, and is remembered as an "outstanding" player whose career was cut short by injuries.

Beynon died just after 9:15 am on 21 October 1966 in the Aberfan disaster and is buried at Aberfan Cemetery. Beynon was deputy head of Pantglas Junior School. His son later said that his father had only been teaching at the school for about six weeks before the disaster, having previously been teaching at a school in Merthyr Tydfil.

== Aberfan disaster ==
On the morning of 21 October 1966, Beynon was in his classroom when the Aberfan disaster unfolded and the slurry from the colliery spoil tip hit the school. He scooped up the five nearest children into his arms and braced himself against a blackboard to shield them from the oncoming avalanche. Beynon and all 34 children in the classroom were killed. The South Wales Argus reported that he had been found dead, still clutching the children in his arms. A rescuer at the time said: "He was clutching five little children in his arms as if he had been protecting them."

His son later recalled: "My mother came home at 2 am the next morning and said my father was dead. She had spent all day there hoping he would be found alive. He was a good father, a well-respected man. There were hundreds at his funeral. I remember the front lawn at our house was covered in wreaths."

The Leslie Norris poem 'Elegy for David Beynon' commemorates the poet's childhood friendship with Beynon and is one of Norris's most anthologised poems.
