= Aberfan Disaster Tribunal =

1966 inquiry

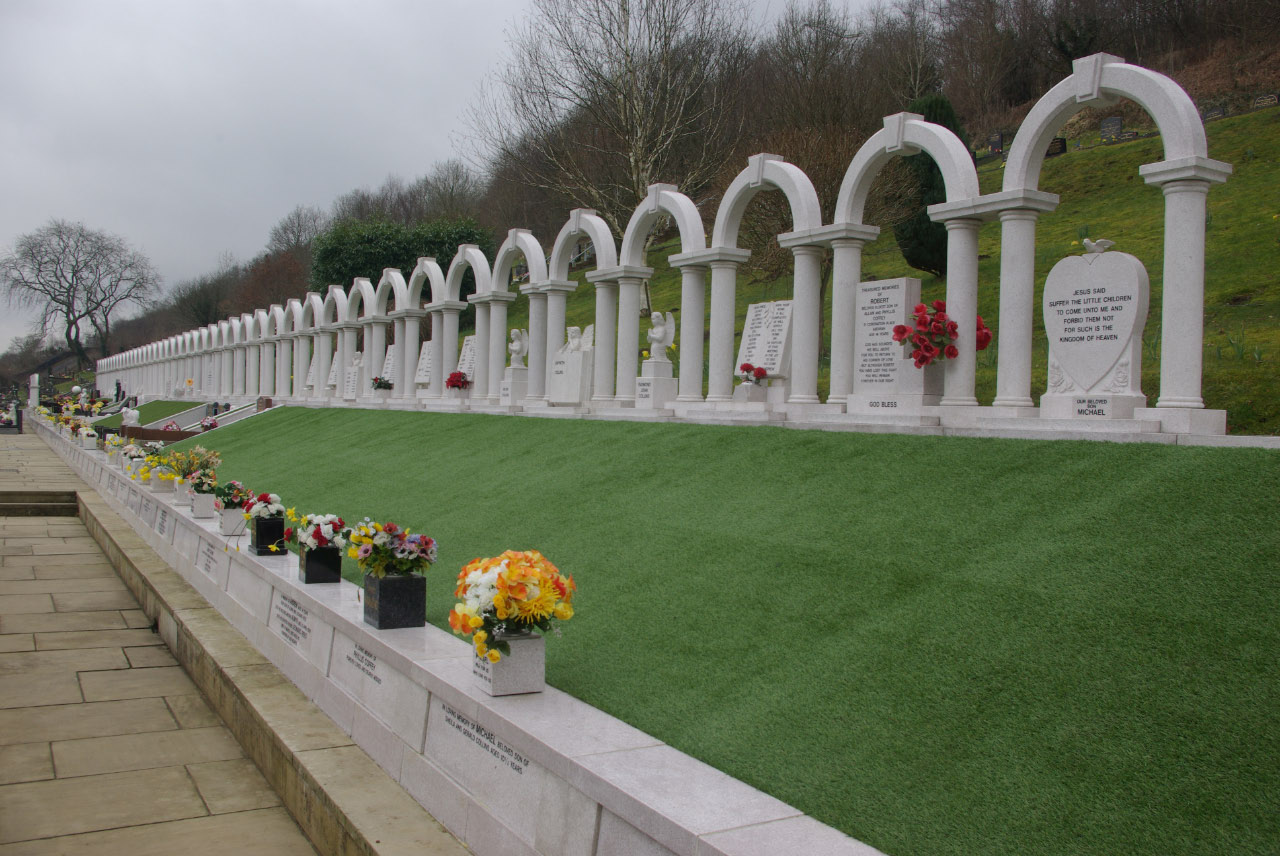
Memorial marking the graves of children killed in the disaster

The Tribunal of Inquiry into the Aberfan Disaster (the Aberfan Disaster Tribunal), chaired by Lord Justice Edmund Davies, was established in 1966 to inquire into the causes of and circumstances of the Aberfan disaster. The report of the tribunal placed the blame for the disaster on the National Coal Board (NCB), naming nine of its staff as having some degree of responsibility.

== The disaster ==
On 21 October 1966, a colliery spoil tip on a hill above the Welsh village of Aberfan near Merthyr Tydfil collapsed, killing 116 children and 28 adults. More than 1.4 million cubic feet (40,000 cu metres) of debris covered a section of the village in minutes. The classrooms at Pantglas Junior School were immediately inundated; young children and teachers died from impact or suffocation.

== Establishment of the tribunal ==
On 26 October 1966, after resolutions in both Houses of Parliament, the Secretary of State for Wales appointed a tribunal to inquire into the causes of and circumstances relating to the Aberfan disaster. (Note: The tribunal was established under the Tribunals (Evidence) Act of 1921. A Royal Commission on Tribunals under Lord Justice Salmon was sitting in 1966. Its report (published in November 1966) noted that 1921 Act tribunals "should never be used for matters of local or minor public importance but always be confined to matters of vital public importance concerning which there is something in the nature of a nation-wide crisis of confidence. In such cases we consider that no other method of investigation would be adequate" (para 27 of Salmon Commission report). In theory, a witness to the Tribunal had no immunity against the use of their evidence against them in subsequent civil or criminal proceedings but the Royal Commission recommended that they be given such immunity (para 63), noting (para 64)"The publicity however which such hearings usually attract is so wide and so overwhelming that it would be virtually impossible for any person against whom an adverse finding was made to obtain a fair trial afterwards. So far no such person has ever been prosecuted. This again may be justified in the public interest because Parliament having decided to set up an inquiry under the Act has clearly considered whether or not civil or criminal proceedings would resolve the matter and has decided that they would not.") It was chaired by the respected Welsh judge and Privy Councillor Lord Justice Edmund Davies, who was born two miles from Aberfan and had attended Mountain Ash Grammar School. The geotechnical consultant was Harold Harding and the third member was Vernon Lawrence former Clerk of Monmouthshire County Council. Professor Alan W. Bishop of Imperial College was appointed to run the geotechnical investigations. Before the tribunal began, the Attorney General imposed restrictions on speculation in the media about the causes of the disaster.

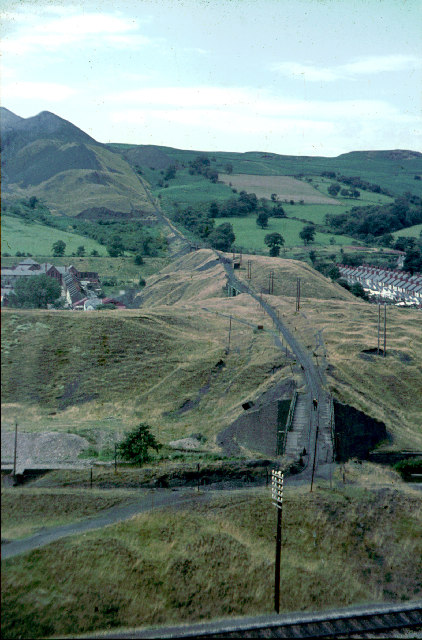
Aberfan Colliery spoil tramway before the disaster, with spoil heaps at top left. The red brick building at mid-left is Pantglas County Secondary School.

== The hearings ==
The tribunal sat for 76 days – the longest inquiry of its type in British history up to that time – taking evidence from 136 witnesses, examining 300 exhibits and hearing 2,500,000 words of testimony, which included the history of mining in the area together with the region's geological conditions. The tribunal report observed that "much of the time of the Tribunal could have been saved if ... the National Coal Board had not stubbornly resisted every attempt to lay the blame where it so clearly must rest — at their door." Not until day 49 had an NCB witness conceded that tip safety arrangements had been inadequate; not until day 65 had one conceded that (contrary to the assertions of Lord Robens, the Chairman of the NCB) the instability of Tip 7 could clearly have been foreseen, and that this had been known within the NCB "even before the formal sittings of the inquiry had started" (italicised in original). Robens was then invited to testify (effectively to explain NCB failure publicly to correct his statements once they were known to be erroneous). He said that he had known before the inquiry started that the instability of the tip was foreseeable. During cross-examination he "gave inconsistent answers": the tribunal was invited by NCB counsel to disregard Robens' evidence and did so. (Note: noting as it did so: 204 ... In our view, Lord Robens, an administrator who expressly disclaimed any technical knowledge, under cross-examination laid claim to having already possessed by the time the Inquiry opened a degree of knowledge which in all probability he later acquired only by that assiduous reading of the daily transcript of evidence to which he himself testified. Had he been called at an earlier stage he would probably have been in no position to express a worthwhile opinion or define an attitude in relation to foreseeability or as to any of the other issues which occupied so much time.: 205. But as Lord Robens himself knew nothing beyond what he was told by others in the calamitous circumstances then prevailing, it was unwise of him to imply at Aberfan that he had knowledge, and it is understandable that his statement was bitterly resented by the residents, who possessed the intimate local knowledge which he lacked.) The tribunal retired on 28 April 1967 to consider its conclusions, publishing its report on 3 August.

== The report ==
The report of the tribunal stated in its introduction:

"... our strong and unanimous view is that the Aberfan disaster could and should have been prevented. ... the Report which follows tells not of wickedness but of ignorance, ineptitude and a failure in communications. Ignorance on the part of those charged at all levels with the siting, control and daily management of tips; bungling ineptitude on the part of those who had the duty of supervising and directing them; and failure on the part of those having knowledge of the factors which affect tip safety to communicate that knowledge and to see that it was applied."

The tribunal's findings were that:

I. Blame for the disaster rests upon the National Coal Board. This blame is shared (though in varying degrees) among the National Coal Board headquarters, the South Western Divisional Board, and certain individuals.

II. There was a total absence of tipping policy and this was the basic cause of the disaster. In this respect, however, the National Coal Board were following in the footsteps of their predecessors. They were not guided either by Her Majesty's Inspectorate of Mines and Quarries or by legislation.

III. There is no legislation dealing with the safety of tips in force in this or any country, except in part of West Germany and in South Africa.

IV. The legal liability of the National Coal Board to pay compensation for the personal injuries (fatal or otherwise) and damage to property is incontestable and uncontested.

The specific cause of the collapse was a build-up of water in the pile; when a small rotational slip occurred, the disturbance caused the saturated, fine material of the tip to liquefy (thixotropy) and flow down the mountain. Although it was estimated that tailings constituted about 10% of the tip at the time of the disaster, the inquiry concluded that they were not a contributory factor in the fatal slide: "Owing to the geological and geographical features and the size of the tip, the expert evidence is that there would have been a major slide even had no tailings been placed on it."

In 1958, the tip had been sited on a known stream (as shown on Ordnance Survey maps) and had previously suffered several minor slips. Its instability was known both to colliery management and to tip workers, but very little was done about it. The tips were the responsibility of mechanical engineers who had only a layman's understanding of tip stability issues. The attention of colliery management and engineers (whom the tribunal noted to be generally devoted and over-worked) was directed elsewhere:

...the great bulk of mining operations take place below ground and that most of the best men in the industry are employed there. It is there that coal is won and in that direction that the attention of those employed in the industry is naturally turned. Rubbish tips are a necessary and inevitable adjunct to a coal mine, even as a dustbin is to a house, but it is plain that miners devote certainly no more attention to rubbish tips than householders do to dustbins.

...

We found that many witnesses … had been oblivious of what lay before their eyes. It did not enter their consciousness. They were like moles being asked about the habits of birds.

The disregard of the NCB and the colliery staff for the tip's unstable geological conditions and its failure to act after previous smaller slides were found to have been major factors that contributed to the catastrophe. The tribunal found that the tips had never been surveyed, and up to the time of the landslide were continuously being added to in a chaotic and unplanned manner. Repeated warnings about the tip's dangerous condition had been ignored; even after representations from Merthyr Borough Council. NCB civil engineers (who should have realised the dangerous state of the tip had they seen it) had not been involved: "if there had been a proper investigation with a view to allaying the fears and resolving the doubts, the effect on the course of events must, in our opinion, have been dramatic and decisive." The tribunal also described as 'an aspect which we have not overlooked' the argument of Geoffrey Howe on behalf of the colliery managers that tailings had played an important role in the mismanagement of the tip: "they were believed to be the significant hazard, and with their stoppage, with their discontinuance on the site, it was believed that the hazard had been removed". No blame lay with Merthyr Tydfil County Borough Council or the National Union of Mineworkers; they had assumed that the NCB was acting on the basis of sound technical advice.

== Subsequent events ==
The NCB paid out £160,000 in compensation: £500 for each fatality, plus money for traumatised survivors and damaged property. (Note: The NCB initially offered the families of the dead £50 for each fatality; the sum was later increased to £500. The NCB called it "a generous offer".) Nine senior NCB staff were named as having some degree of responsibility for the accident and the tribunal report was scathing in its criticism of evidence given by the principal NCB witnesses. Lord Robens, addressing the National Union of Mineworkers in 1963 had said "If we are going to make pits safer for men we shall have to discipline the wrongdoer. I have no sympathy at all for those people—whether men, management or officials—who act in any way which endangers the lives and limbs of others." No NCB staff were demoted, sacked or prosecuted as a consequence of the Aberfan disaster or for evidence given to the inquiry (one notably unsatisfactory witness had been promoted by the time Parliament debated the Davies Report); Lord Robens and the board of the NCB retained their positions.

Following the report's publication, Robens wrote to the Minister of Power, Richard Marsh, offering his resignation. Although Robens had a combative relationship with the government and several cabinet ministers argued strongly that he should go, in September 1967 the Prime Minister Harold Wilson and Marsh refused to accept Robens's resignation offer. According to Ronald Dearing, a senior member of staff at the Ministry of Power, who briefed Marsh on the matter, the fact that Robens was "taking the coal industry through a period of painful contraction without big strikes" and the strong support for him within the coal industry and the union movement were crucial to the decision to retain him. Leo Abse spoke for many other critics: ..."when I saw what I regarded as the graceless pavane danced by Lord Robens and the Minister, as the Chairman of the Coal Board coyly offered his resignation and, equally coyly, the Minister rejected the offer, I thought that it was a disgraceful spectacle." Papers released in 1997 under the thirty-year rule show that Robens worked with the NUM to gather support, then agreed to the wording of a letter from Marsh refusing Robens' resignation before offering his supposed resignation. In an interview broadcast in 2006, Marsh, after talking about a discussion with Robens, said:

We went through this and I said "Well, you send me in your resignation, and I will send you back a letter saying 'quite understand it, but I don't accept it'"

— Richard Marsh

== Bibliography ==
- McLean, Iain and Johnes, Martin (2009), Aberfan: Government and Disasters, Cardiff: Welsh Academic Press, ISBN 186-057-033X; ISBN 978-1860-570-339
- Archives Network Wales – Glamorgan Record Office– Aberfan Disaster Inquiry, Chief Surveyor's Papers
