= Ethel May Hovey =

British 20th century campaigner for women's rights, education and maternity care

Ethel May Hovey (1871–1953) was a pioneer of women's education, maternity and welfare rights in North Wales. She was a suffragist and strongly supported social reform, especially for women's wellbeing and welfare beyond gaining voting rights. She was a local councillor, Mayor of Colwyn Bay, magistrate, philanthropist and active in a wide range of local organisations.

== Biography ==
Hovey was born in Sheffield in 1871, one of 11 children in an nonconformist family. Her father, George H. Hovey, had a profitable drapery business. She was educated privately, including at Penrhos College, a small private Methodist school for girls in Colwyn Bay, then returned home to Sheffield and worked as a clerk in her father's business gaining financial experience. She went back to Colwyn Bay as Lady Matron and Bursar of Penrhos College after her graduate sister Rosa was appointed as the head in 1895. Hovey's business acumen led to relocation of the school to a better site, new buildings and expansion of pupil numbers. They encouraged their pupils to consider degree level studies at the universities that admitted women. She made an effort to learn Welsh and to use both English and Welsh in her later election campaigns.

From 1910 Hovey became involved in local politics, joined local committees, spoke at public meetings and donated money to support organisations. This included the local branch of the British Women's Temperance Association as well as becoming treasurer of the Colwyn Bay branch of the National Union of Women's Suffrage Societies. She joined the North Wales Women's Liberal Federation and later accepted the presidency of the new local branch of the National Council of Women. She also had non-elected roles on local council committees. In particular she chaired the council committee for the welfare of women and girls. Over the years she met many people who were prominent locally but also nationally including King Edward VII, David Lloyd George and Margaret Lloyd George. She and her sister became friends with the Lloyd George family.

In 1919 changes in the law permitted women take up any civil or judicial post. This allowed Hovey to be appointed as a magistrate. She was also elected as a councillor on the urban district council of Colwyn Bay and became a member of 10 committees. She continued as a councillor until 1951. In 1926 she was elected to chair the council, and thus was the first woman to chair an urban district council in Wales. In particular she campaigned for better maternity care and pensions. She travelled abroad, to Canada in 1925 and New Zealand (1929) as part of delegations about women's suffrage, education and maternity rights. In 1928 she and her sister retired from running Penrhos College. She was active in advocating for Colwyn Bay to become a municipal borough (achieved September 1934), including addressing parliamentary committees. In 1934 she was elected the Lady Mayor of Colwyn Bay's Urban District Council. She was Mayor of Colwyn Bay Borough Council 1945–1946, the first woman to take this role, and was deputy mayor the following year. She was granted the freedom of the borough in April 1952.

Due to her efforts, two buildings were converted into the Nant y Glyn Maternity Home and Clinic, opened 1939. This was fortunate timing since during the Second World War, many government ministries were moved away from London. The Ministry of Food was re-located to Colwyn Bay and increased the local birthrate. She continued to advocate for an extension and incubators, providing some funding herself.

She died on 25 September 1953, aged 83.

== Legacy ==
Hovey established scholarships in memory of her sister Rosa (died 1932) to support Penrhos College pupils while at the school and also towards the costs of attending the University of Wales at Bangor or Somerville College, Oxford. In 1944 she also supported music scholarships from Denbighshire to the Royal College of Music and the Royal Academy of Music. She also established and funded the Rosa Hovey Charitable Trust and Housing Trust in 1933 that ran a small amount of housing for low-income people, including the elderly.

A portrait of her in mayoral robes was painted in 1946. This hung in the council chamber for many years, but then mislaid. It was finally located around 2025 in the Conwy Museum Archives. It is planned to be restored and then displayed.

In 1953 a fountain was installed in the town's Queen's Garden in her memory by the National Council of Women, and a sporting cup for County Netball was named for her. In March 2025 a Purple Plaque was installed in the Nant y Glyn Centre, Colwyn Bay, the site of the maternity home associated with her work.
