= Mynydd Merthyr =

Ridge in south Wales, U.K.

Coordinates: 51°42′18″N 3°22′23″W

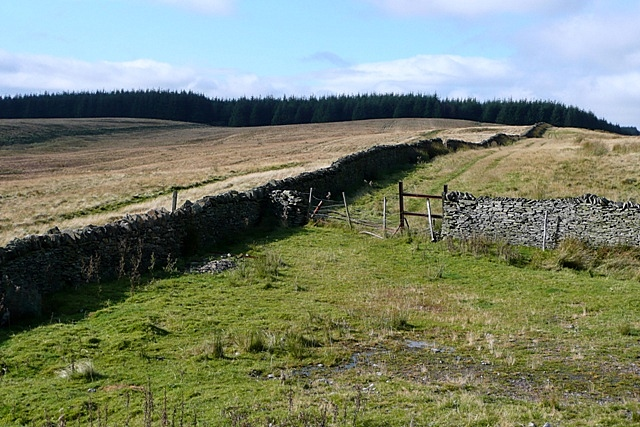
Mynydd Merthyr

Mynydd Merthyr is a broad ridge of high ground between Taff Vale (Welsh Cwm Taf) and the Cwm Cynon in the Valleys region of South Wales. It forms the boundary between the unitary authorities of Rhondda Cynon Taff to the west and Merthyr Tydfil to the east.

The high point of 493m is at Mynydd Gethin (OS grid reference SO 044025) (though the summit trig point is at the lower height of 491m) is the culmination of a long ridge which extends northwestwards from the confluence of the Afon Cynon and the River Taff at Abercynon. The ridge includes the subsidiary summits of Twyn Brynbychan and Twyn Sych. To the northwest lies Mynydd Aberdâr.

Much of the hill has been planted with coniferous forest. Its flanks are heavily scarred by mining. The village of Aberfan sits at the foot of its eastern slopes, the scene of the Aberfan disaster on 21 October 1966 when a coal tip above the village slipped and engulfed the village school killing 144 people of whom 116 were children.

== Geology ==
The entire hill is composed of sandstones and mudstones dating from the Carboniferous Period. There are also numerous coal seams within the sequence, most of which have been worked. The upper part of the hill including the summit plateau is formed from the Pennant Sandstone, a rock assigned to the Carboniferous Upper Coal Measures. The flanks of the hill owe their steepness in part to the action of glacial ice during the succession of ice ages.

== Access ==
Virtually all of the afforested areas and some adjoining areas of moorland are classed as open country under the CRoW Act giving a right of access to walkers. In addition there is a limited network of public footpaths and other public rights of way which give access to parts of the hill.
