= Beatrice Lewis =

Welsh social reformer (1877-11929)

- Born: Birth date 1877; Ely, Cardiff
- Died: Death date 1929, aged 52
- Known for: social activist

Beatrice Lewis (1877-1929) was a Welsh working-class social activist and was the first woman elected as a councillor in Barry, Vale of Glamorgan in 1919.

Beatrice Lewis was born in Ely, Cardiff 1877 to a poor, working-class family. She married William Jenkin Lewis, a coal trimmer, when she was 20 and moved to Barry. They had five surviving children when she died in 1929.

There was significant poverty, disease and high infant mortality among the Barry community. She became active in efforts to improve the situation and to represent her community to those in power. She stood for election in 1919, the first year that women were allowed to do so. She campaigned for improved maternity services, including a clinic, against the opposition of several men. During the General Strike of 1926 she led the relief committee and organised a soup kitchen. She was elected as a councillor on Barry Urban District Council and sat on committees covering health, education, housing and child welfare, representing the Castleland ward until her death.

Her obituary noted:

one of the leading women of the Socialist party of South Wales, who almost single handedly championed the establishment of a maternity clinic in Barry. She was progressive in thought and action, forceful in debate and commanded the respect of her fellow councillors.

There is a plaque about her in the Merthyr Dyfan cemetery, and in 2026 a Purple Plaque was installed there to mark her life that improved conditions for women in her community.
