= Mabel Wulff =

British church caretaker in Germany (1888–1978)

- Born: Mabel Amelia Phillips; January 12, 1888; Newport, Wales
- Died: April 22, 1978 (aged 90); Newport, Wales
- Occupation: Church caretaker in Germany
- Years active: 1924 - 1964

Mabel Wulff (1888-1978) was the British caretaker of the St Thomas à Becket English Church in Hamburg for 40 years (1924 - 1964). She protected the church during the Second World War, preventing damage from incendiary bombs, helped to care for people made homeless by bombing, and assisted with restoration of the church after the end of the war. She also concealed flags, paintings and other items to prevent their destruction. She was awarded the British Empire Medal in 1956.

Mabel Amelia Phillips was born in Newport, Wales in 3 September 1887. She worked as a seamstress and married Max Wilhelm Ludwig Wulff, a German seaman who had settled in Newport and ran a cafe, on 7 January 1909. He then became a ship's cook and later worked on a dredger, while they had two children in 1911 and 1913. When the First World War started, Max Wulff was interned, first in Lancaster and then Knockaloe Internment Camp, Isle of Man. Wulff refused to divorce her husband despite being encouraged to do so by the prevailing anti-German sentiment. After the war ended, he was forced to return to Germany and found work in the Hamburg docks. In 1921 or 1922, Mable and their two children joined him in Hamburg.

From 1924 Wulff was the caretake of the neo-classical St Thomas à Becket English Church in Hamburg and the family lived in a flat at the east end of the church. Their eldest son returned to Britain in the early 1930s and eventually joined the Royal Navy. Their younger son stayed in Germany, working as an electrician but this became difficult with the rise of Nazism. He died of meningitis in 1934.

Life became more difficult for the Wulffs as the Second World War started. The Gestapo harassed Wulff, but did not arrest or intern her. The Royal British Legion had founded a branch in Hamburg in 1934 and donated a flag to the church, which Wulff concealed during the Second World War, along with a Union Flag. She also put paintings donated to the church in 1838 and the marble font into safe storage. In 1941 the church was placed on a list of buildings of historical merit, despite its British connection. Even so, it was used as a warehouse for groceries and horse fodder, and also sheltered homeless people for a short time. When the area was being bombed by the Royal Air Force during Operation Gomorrah in summer 1943, Wulff was there to put out fires that would otherwise have destroyed the building. In 1944 - 1945 further bombing damaged the roof and fabric of the church. However, her actions prevented the total destruction of the church

After the war ended, Wulff was able to give advice during the restoration of the church from her knowledge of the building. She continued as the caretaker. After the death of her husband in 1964, she retired and returned to Newport. She died 22 April 1978.

== Awards ==
Wulff was awarded the British Empire Medal for meritorious service in 1956. In September 2019 a memorial plaque to her was installed on the church in Germany. Her grand son and great grand-daughter were present for the ceremony. In June 2026 a Purple Plaque was installed at Maindee Library, Newport, to commemorate her life.
