= Nansi Williams =

Welsh dinner lady

- Born: Nansi O'Brien; 1922; Aberfan, Wales
- Died: 21 October 1966 (aged 43–44); Aberfan, Wales
- Occupation: Dinner lady
- Known for: actions during Aberfan disaster
- Spouse: David Williams

Nansi Williams (née O'Brien; 1922 – 21 October 1966) was a school dinner lady at Pantglas Junior School in Aberfan, Wales. She was killed in the Aberfan disaster of 1966, but saved the lives of five children by shielding them from the flow of slurry which struck the town after a spoil tip collapsed.

== Personal life ==
Nansi Williams (née O'Brien) was born in 1922 in the Aberfan Cemetery House, the daughter of Dennis and Maud O'Brien. She married David R. Williams. The couple had no children. She died on 21 October 1966 in the Aberfan disaster and is buried in Aberfan Cemetery.

== Aberfan disaster ==
Williams was a school meals clerk at Pantglas Junior School in Aberfan. On 21 October 1966, she was collecting school dinner money when slurry from the colliery spoil tip hit the school. She told the children who were queuing up to get on the ground and flung herself on top of them. Williams was killed instantly but all five of the children she shielded survived. When her body was later recovered, rescuers found she was still holding a pound note she had been collecting as lunch money.

The BBC screened a documentary to mark the 50th anniversary of the disaster called Surviving Aberfan. Karen Thomas, one of the children shielded by Williams, described to BBC Wales in an interview how her life had been saved by Williams' quick thinking:

"At the other end of the hall glass started coming down the corridor from the head mistress's room and Nansi the dinner lady jumped on top of us. The wall I think more or less pushed us all together and she took the full impact."

Thomas and the other children did not realise initially that Williams was dead and attempted to pull her hair to wake her.

== Recognition ==
In 2026, a Purple Plaque was installed near the cemetery in Aberfan in her honour.
