= Aberfan disaster =

1966 Welsh colliery disaster

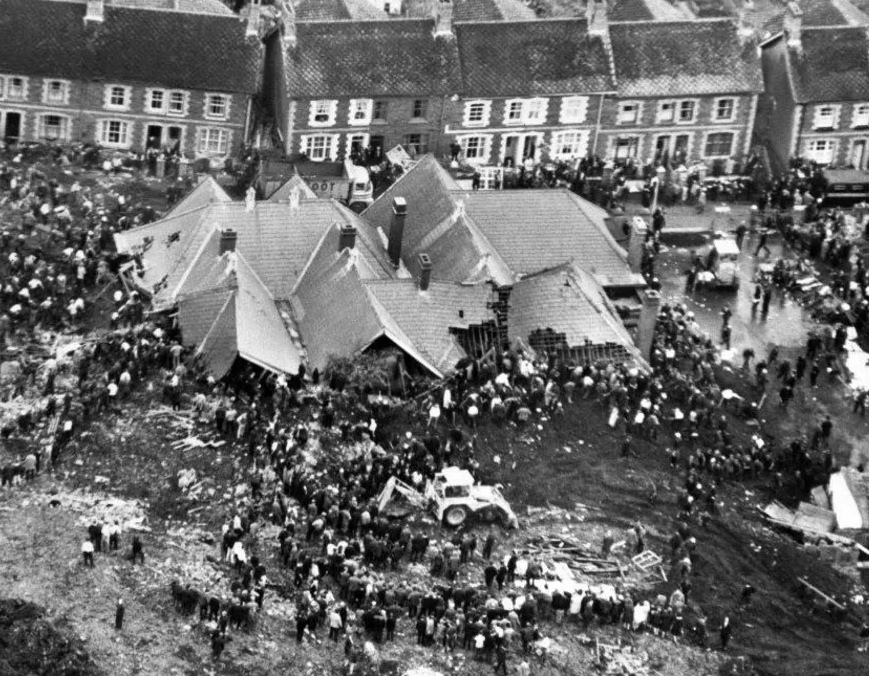
- Rescuers searching the remains of the school
- Date: 21 October 1966; 60 years ago
- Location: Aberfan, Glamorgan, Wales; 51°41′41″N 3°20′51″W
- Deaths: 144 (28 adults, 116 children)
- Inquiries: Aberfan Disaster Tribunal
- Resulted in the passing of the Mines and Quarries (Tips) Act 1969

The Aberfan disaster (/ˌabɛrˈvan/, Welsh: Trychineb Aberfan) was the catastrophic collapse of a colliery spoil tip on 21 October 1966. The tip had been created on a mountain slope above the Welsh village of Aberfan, near Merthyr Tydfil, and overlaid a natural spring. Heavy rain led to a build-up of water within the tip which caused it to suddenly slide downhill as a slurry, killing 116 children and 28 adults as it engulfed Pantglas Junior School and a row of houses. The tip was the responsibility of the National Coal Board (NCB), and the subsequent inquiry placed the blame for the disaster on the organisation and nine named employees.

There were seven spoil tips on the hills above Aberfan; Tip 7—the one that slipped onto the village—was started in 1958 and, at the time of the disaster, was 111 feet (34 m) high. In contravention of the NCB's procedures, the tip was partly on ground from which springs emerged. After three weeks of heavy rain the tip was saturated and approximately 140,000 cubic yards (110,000 m^{3}) of spoil slipped down the side of the hill and onto the Pantglas area of the village. The main building hit was the local junior school, where lessons had just begun; 5 teachers and 109 children were killed.

An official inquiry was chaired by Lord Justice Edmund Davies. The report placed the blame squarely on the NCB. The organisation's chairman, Lord Robens, was criticised for making misleading statements and for not providing clarity as to the NCB's knowledge of the presence of water springs on the hillside. Neither the NCB nor any of its employees were prosecuted and the organisation was not fined.

The Aberfan Disaster Memorial Fund (ADMF) was established on the day of the disaster. It received nearly 88,000 contributions, totalling £1.75 million. The remaining tips were removed only after a lengthy fight by Aberfan residents against resistance from the NCB and the government on the grounds of cost. The site's clearance was paid for by a government grant and a forced contribution of £150,000 taken from the memorial fund. In 1997 the British government paid back the £150,000 to the ADMF, and in 2007 the Welsh Government donated £1.5 million to the fund and £500,000 to the Aberfan Education Charity as recompense for the money wrongly taken. Many of the village's residents developed medical problems as a result of the disaster, and half the survivors have experienced post-traumatic stress disorder at some time in their lives.

== Background ==
Aberfan in modern-day Merthyr Tydfil County Borough.

Aberfan is situated toward the bottom of the western valley slope of the Taff Valley, on the eastern slope of Mynydd Merthyr, approximately four miles (6 km) south of Merthyr Tydfil. When the Merthyr Vale Colliery was sunk on 23 August 1869 by John Nixon and partners, Aberfan consisted of two cottages and an inn frequented by local farmers and bargemen. By 1966 its population had grown to approximately 5,000, most of whom were employed in the coal industry. Since the nationalisation of the British coal industry in 1947, Aberfan's colliery had been under the control of the National Coal Board (NCB). Regulation in the coal industry was provided by HM Inspectorate of Mines. The inspectors had worked as engineers in the coal industry and were former employees of the NCB. The River Taff runs north-to-south through the village; at the upper side of the settlement, on the western outskirts, the bed of the disused Glamorganshire Canal and a disused railway embankment run parallel to the river.

The first spoil from the coal mine was deposited on the valley's lower slopes, east of the canal, but during the 1910s the first tip was started on the western slopes, above the canal line and the village. By 1966 there were seven spoil heaps, comprising approximately 2.6 million cu yd (2.0 million m^{3}) of waste. (Note: Only one tip was used at a time. They were begun in the following years: Tip 1: during the First World War. 85 feet (26 m) high and containing 235,000 cubic yards (180,000 m^{3}) of spoil; Tip 2: 1918. 90 feet (27 m) high, containing 574,000 cubic yards (439,000 m^{3}) of spoil; Tip 3: 1925. 130 feet (40 m) high, containing 210,000 cubic yards (160,000 m^{3}) of spoil; Tip 4: 1933. 147 feet (45 m) high, containing 572,000 cubic yards (437,000 m^{3}) of spoil; Tip 5: 1945. 171 feet (52 m) high, containing 706,000 cubic yards (540,000 m^{3}) of spoil; Tip 6: 1956. 56 feet (17 m) high, containing 67,000 cubic yards (51,000 m^{3}) of spoil; Tip 7: Easter 1958. 111 feet (34 m) high, containing 297,000 cubic yards (227,000 m^{3}) of spoil) Tips 4 and 5 were conical mounds at the apex of the slope, although Tip 4 was misshapen from an earlier slip; the remaining five were lower down; all were directly above the village. Tip 7 was the only one being used in 1966. About 111 feet (34 m) high, it contained 297,000 cubic yards (227,000 m^{3}) of spoil, which included 30,000 cubic yards (23,000 m^{3}) of tailings—waste from the chemical extraction of coal, fine particles of coal and ash which took on properties similar to quicksand when wet.

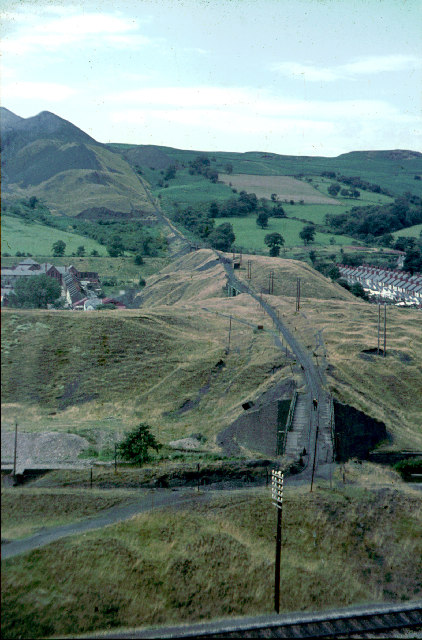
The Aberfan Colliery spoil tramway in 1964, with spoil heaps at top left. The pennant sandstone building at mid-left is Pantglas County Secondary School, which lies adjacent to the junior school.

Tip stability is affected by water conditions. Tips 4, 5 and 7 had been sited on streams or springs. The presence of the springs was common knowledge in the area, and they had been marked on the Ordnance Survey and Geological Society maps since 1874. Tip 4 at Aberfan, which had been used between 1933 and 1945, was large, and had been started on boggy ground between two streams. At the time of its planning, the Merthyr Tydfil borough engineer thought that despite the position, it would be unlikely to avalanche. Following some ground movements in the tip in the early 1940s, a drainage channel was dug in early 1944. In November that year part of the tip slid 1,600 feet (490 m) down the mountain to stop approximately 500 feet (150 m) above the village. In May 1963 Tip 7 shifted slightly; in November that year there was a more substantial slide. The NCB stated that the movement had not been a "slide", but was instead a "tailings run"—a run-off of tailings from the surface of the tip—which left its stability unaffected. After the slide, the NCB stopped tipping tailings on number 7, but normal spoil continued to be deposited.

Aberfan is in an area of relatively high rainfall, an average of 60 inches (1,500 mm) a year. In 1960 it was 70.5 inches (1,790 mm), the heaviest of recent years in the run-up to the disaster. Between 1952 and 1965, there was severe flooding in the Pantglas area of Aberfan on at least 11 occasions. Residents complained that the flood water was black and left a greasy residue when it receded. Complaints had been made by residents to Merthyr Tydfil County Borough Council, who corresponded with the NCB between July 1963 and March 1964 on the topic of the "Danger from Coal Slurry being tipped at the rear of the Pantglas Schools". In early 1965 meetings were held between the council and the NCB at which the Board agreed to take action on the clogged pipes and drainage ditches that were the cause of the flooding. No action had been taken by October 1966 when the tip collapsed.

== Tip collapse ==
During the first three weeks of October 1966 there were 6.5 inches (170 mm) of rainfall, nearly half of which was in the third week. During the night of 20–21 October the peak of Tip 7 subsided by 9–10 feet (2.7–3.0 m) and the rails on which the spoil was transported to the top of the tip fell into the resulting hole. The spoil movement was discovered at 7:30 am by the first members of the morning shift manning the heaps. One of the workers walked to the colliery to report the slip; he returned with the supervisor for the tips, and it was decided that no further work would be done that day, but that a new tipping position would be decided on the following week. (Note: Small sinkings were not uncommon on the tips, normally measuring 3–4 feet (90–120 cm).)

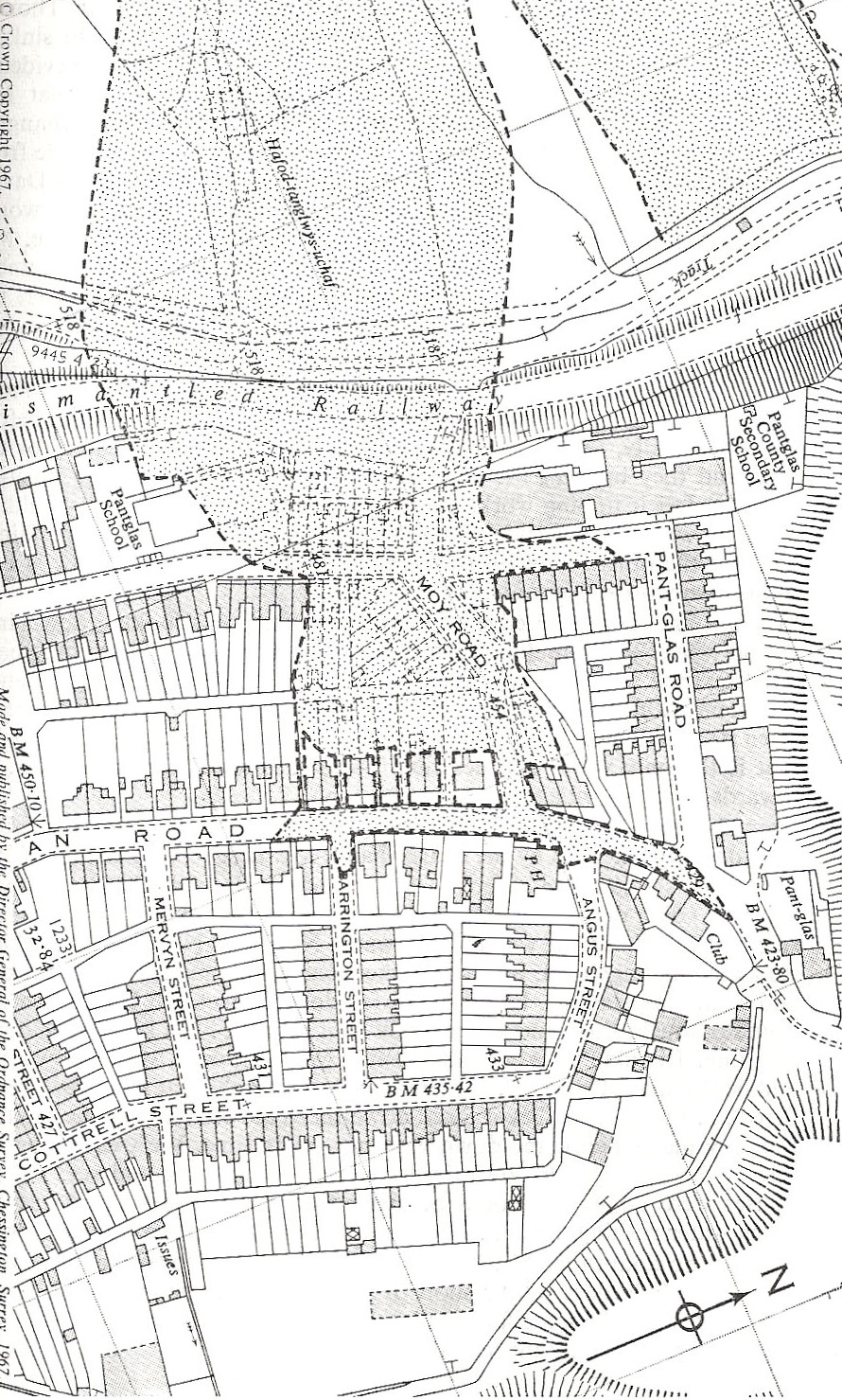
Map from the 1967 inquiry report, showing the extent of the spoil spill (stippled, within dotted lines)

At 9:15 am a significant amount of water-saturated debris broke away from tip 7 and flowed downhill at 11–21 miles per hour (18–34 km/h) in waves 20–30 feet (6.1–9.1 m) high. (Note: The tipping crew saw the landslide start but were unable to raise the alarm because their telephone cable had been stolen. The official inquiry established that the slip happened so fast that a telephone warning would not have saved any lives.) G. M. J. Williams, a consultant engineer who gave evidence at the subsequent tribunal, stated that the 9:15 am movement:

took part of the saturated material past the point where liquefaction occurred. This initially liquefied material began to move rapidly, releasing energy which liquefied the rest of the saturated portion of the tip, and almost instantaneously the nature of the saturated lower parts of Tip No. 7 was changed from that of a solid to that of a heavy liquid of a density of approximately twice that of water. This was 'the dark glistening wave' which several witnesses saw burst from the bottom of the tip.

Approximately 140,000 cubic yards (110,000 m^{3}) of spoil slid 700 yards (640 m) down the mountain, destroying two farm cottages and killing the occupants. Around 50,000 cubic yards (38,000 m^{3}) travelled across the canal and railway embankment and into the village. The flow destroyed two water mains buried in the embankment and the additional water further saturated the spoil. Those who heard the avalanche said the sound reminded them of a low-flying jet or thunder.

The avalanche struck Pantglas Junior School on Moy Road, demolishing and engulfing much of the structure and filling classrooms with thick mud, sludge and rubble; 109 children, from 240 attendees, and five teachers were killed in the school. The pupils of Pantglas Junior School had arrived only minutes earlier for the last day before the half-term holiday, which was due to start at 12 midday. The teachers had just begun to record the children's attendance in the registers when the landslide hit. The adjacent secondary school was also damaged, and 18 houses on surrounding roads were destroyed. Mud and water from the slide flooded other houses in the vicinity, forcing many to evacuate their homes. Once the slide material had come to a halt, it re-solidified. (Note: Williams explained to the inquiry that "Being of the nature of a liquid the whole mass then moved very rapidly down the hillside, spreading out sideways into a layer of substantially uniform thickness. As this happened, water was escaping from the mass so that the particles of soil regained their contact and the soil mass returned to its solid nature.") A huge mound of slurry up to 30 feet (9.1 m) high blocked the area. The acting headmaster of the secondary school recalled:

The Girls' Entrance [of the secondary school] was approximately two-thirds to three-quarters full of rubble and waste material ... I climbed onto the rubble in the doorway ... when I looked directly in front of me ... I saw that the houses in Moy Road had vanished in a mass of tip-waste material and that the Junior School gable-ends, or part of the roof, were sticking up out of this morass. I looked down to my right and I saw that the Moy Road houses had gone.

Some staff died trying to protect the children. Nansi Williams, the school meals clerk, used her body to shield five children, who all survived; Williams did not, and was found by rescuers still holding a pound note she had been collecting as lunch money. Dai Beynon, the deputy headmaster, tried to use a blackboard to shield himself and five children from the slurry pouring through the school. He and all 34 pupils in his class were killed. When the avalanche stopped, so did the noise; one resident recalled that "in that silence you couldn't hear a bird or a child".

== Rescue efforts and retrieval of the bodies ==
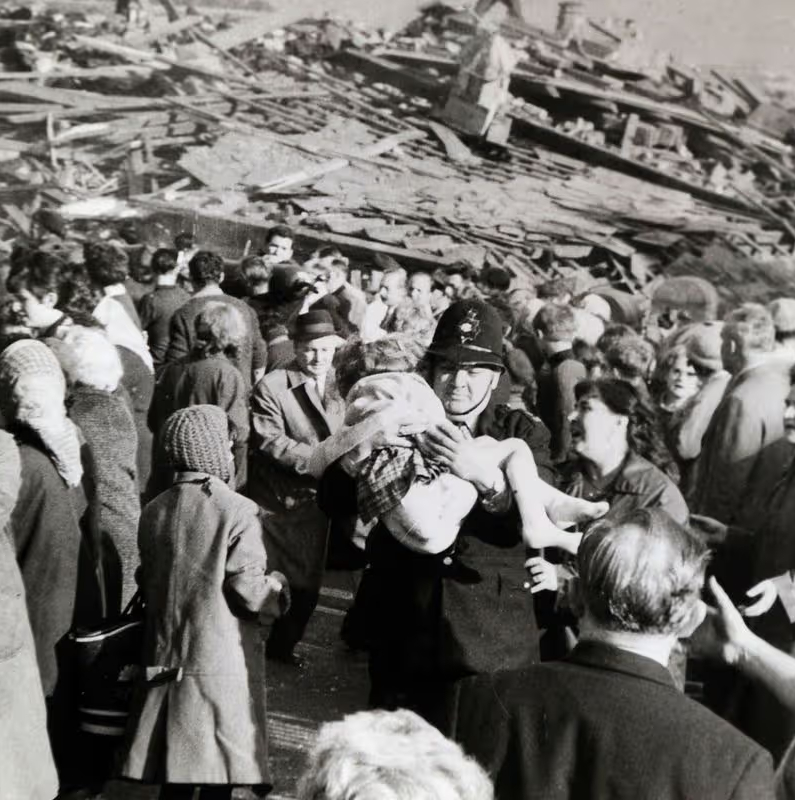
The rescue of a young girl from the school; no survivors were found after 11:00 am

After the landslide stopped, local residents rushed to the school and began digging through the rubble, moving material by hand or with garden tools. At 9:25 am Merthyr Tydfil police received a phone call from a local resident who said "I have been asked to inform that there has been a landslide at Pantglas. The tip has come down on the school"; the fire brigade, based in Merthyr Tydfil, received a call at about the same time. Calls were then made to local hospitals, the ambulance service and the local Civil Defence Corps. The first miners from the Aberfan colliery arrived within 20 minutes of the disaster, having been raised from the coal seams where they had been working. They directed the early digging, knowing that unplanned excavation could lead to collapse of the spoil and the remnants of the buildings; they worked in organised groups under the control of their pit managers.

The first casualties from the wreckage of the school arrived at St Tydfil's Hospital in Merthyr Tydfil at 9:50 am; the remaining rescued casualties all arrived before 11:00 am: 22 children, one of whom was dead on arrival, and 5 adults. A further 9 casualties were sent to the East Glamorgan General Hospital. No survivors were found after 11:00 am. Of the 144 people who died in the disaster, 116 were children, mostly between the ages of 7 and 10; 109 of the children died inside Pantglas Junior School. Five of the adults who died were teachers at the school. An additional 6 adults and 29 children were injured.

The 10:30 am BBC news summary led with the story of the disaster. The result was that thousands of volunteers travelled to Aberfan to help, although their efforts often hampered the work of the experienced miners or trained rescue teams.

Aerial photographs of the spoil tips above Aberfan before and after the disaster

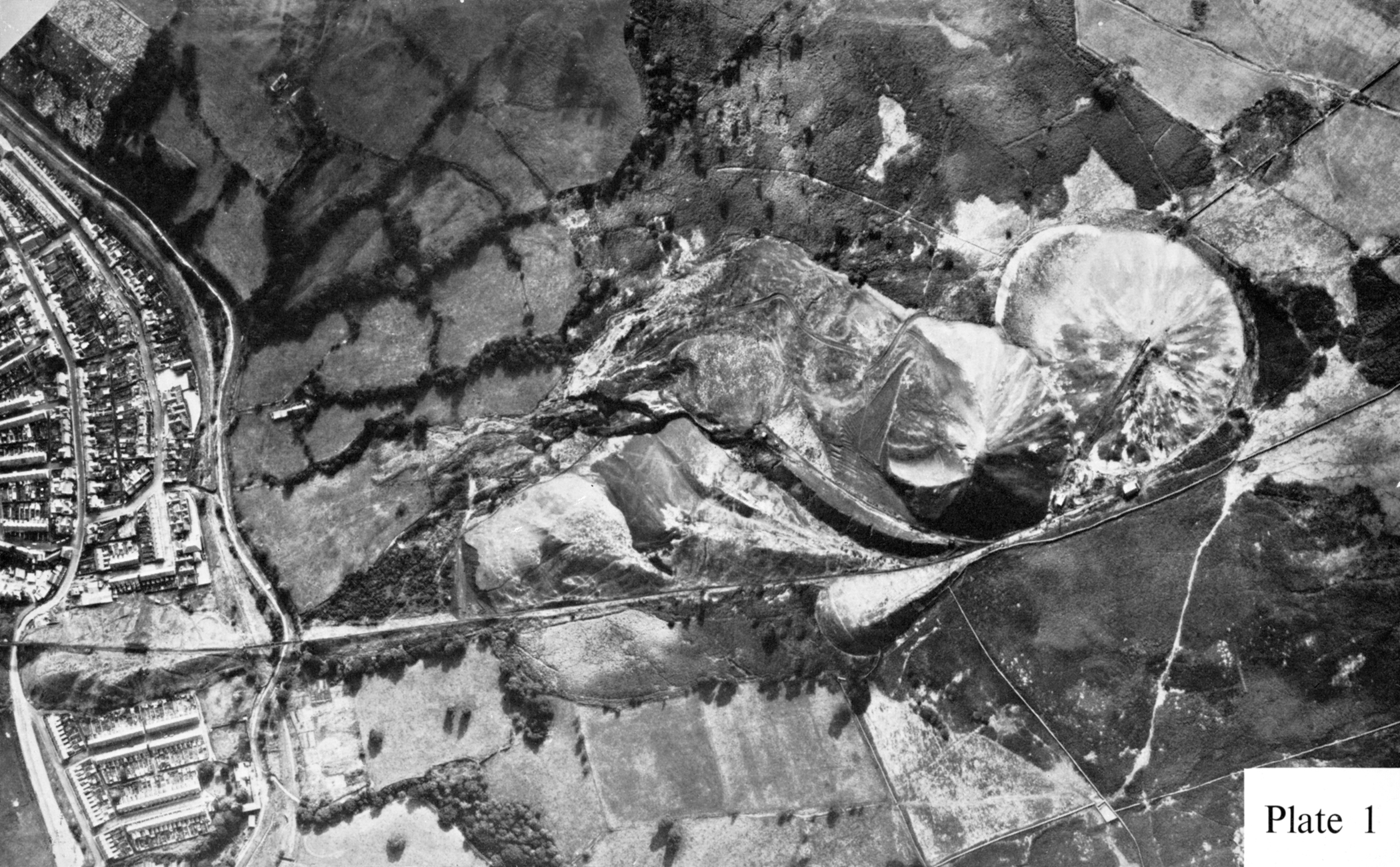
Before the slip

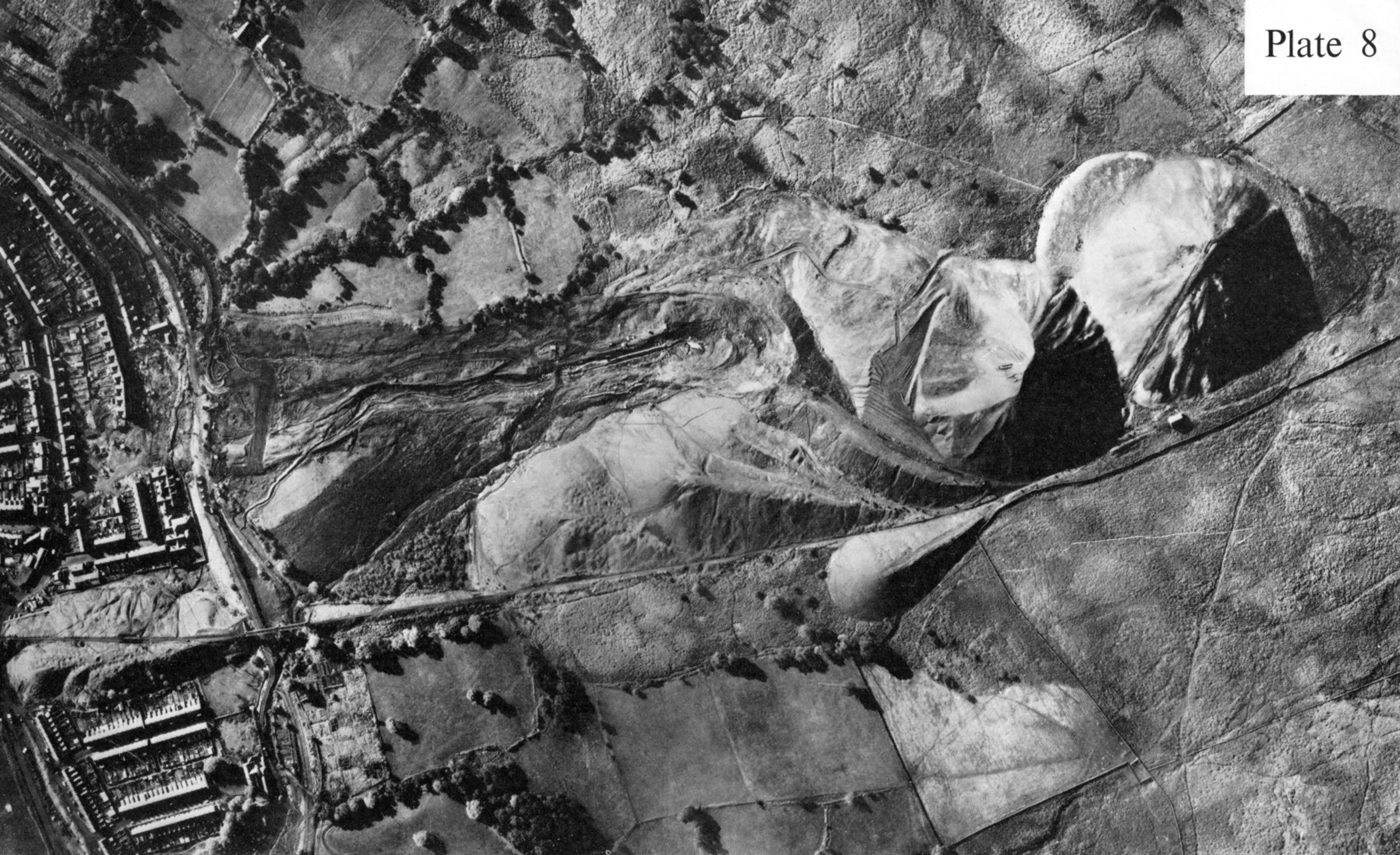
After the slip

With the two broken water mains still pumping water into the spoil in Aberfan, the slip continued to move through the village, and it was not until 11:30 am that the water authorities managed to turn off the supply. (Note: It takes over an hour to shut down mains water supplies, and the valves for the feeder pipes, which needed to be operated manually, were spread out over several branches. Even once they were closed, there were still at least two miles of water-filled pipes that drained into the disaster area.) It was estimated that the mains added between 2 and 3 million imperial gallons (9–14 million litres) of water to the spoil slurry. With movement in the upper slopes still a danger, at 12:00 noon NCB engineers began digging a drainage channel, with the aim of stabilising the tip. It took two hours to reroute the water to a safer place, from where it was diverted into an existing water course.

An NCB board meeting that morning, headed by the organisation's chairman, Lord Robens, was informed of the disaster. It was decided that the NCB's Director-General of Production and its Chief Safety Engineer should inspect the situation, and they left for the village immediately. In his autobiography, Robens stated that the decision for him not to go was because "the appearance of a layman at too early a stage inevitably distracts senior and essential people from the tasks upon which they should be exclusively concentrating". Instead of visiting the scene, that evening Robens went to the ceremony to invest him as the chancellor of the University of Surrey. NCB officers covered for him when contacted by Cledwyn Hughes, the Secretary of State for Wales, falsely claiming that Robens was personally directing relief work.

Hughes visited the scene at 4:00 pm for an hour. He telephoned Harold Wilson, the Prime Minister, and confirmed Wilson's own thought that he should also visit. Wilson told Hughes to "take whatever action he thought necessary, irrespective of any considerations of 'normal procedures', expenditure or statutory limitations". Wilson arrived at Aberfan at 9:40 pm, where he heard reports from the police and civil defence forces, and visited the rescue workers. Before he left, at midnight, he and Hughes agreed that a high-level independent inquiry needed to be held. That evening the mayor of Merthyr Tydfil launched an appeal for financial donations—soon formally named the Aberfan Disaster Fund—to alleviate financial hardship and to help rebuild the area.

A makeshift mortuary was set up in the village's Bethania Chapel on 21 October and operated until 4 November, 250 yards (229 m) from the disaster site; members of the Glamorgan Constabulary force assisted with the identification and registration of the victims. Two doctors examined the bodies and issued death certificates; the cause of death was typically asphyxia, fractured skull or multiple crush injuries. Cramped conditions in the chapel meant that parents could only be admitted one at a time to identify the bodies of their children. The building also acted as a missing persons bureau and its vestry was used by Red Cross volunteers and St John Ambulance stretcher-bearers. Four hundred embalmers volunteered to assist with the cleaning and dressing of the corpses; a contingent that flew over from Northern Ireland removed the seats of their plane to transport child-sized coffins. The smaller Aberfan Calvinistic Chapel nearby was used as a second mortuary from 22 to 29 October.

By the morning of Saturday 22 October, 111 bodies had been recovered, of which 51 had been identified. At daybreak Queen Elizabeth II's brother-in-law Lord Snowdon visited and spoke with workers and parents; at 11:00 am Prince Philip, Duke of Edinburgh, visited the scene and talked to rescue workers. In the early afternoon light rain began falling, which became increasingly heavy; it caused further movement in the tip, which threatened the rescue work and raised the possibility that the area would have to be evacuated.

Robens arrived in Aberfan on Saturday evening. After visiting the colliery and the disaster site, he gave a press conference at which he stated that the NCB would work with any public inquiry. In an interview with The Observer, Robens said the organisation "will not seek to hide behind any legal loophole or make any legal quibble about responsibility". Robens returned to the village the following morning to see the situation in daylight. He was interviewed by a television news team while examining the tip. When asked about the responsibility of the NCB for the slide, he answered:

I wouldn't have thought myself that anybody would know that there was a spring deep in the heart of a mountain, any more than I can tell you there is one under our feet where we are now. If you are asking me did any of my people on the spot know that there was this spring water, then the answer is, No—they couldn't possibly. ... It was impossible to know that there was a spring in the heart of this tip which was turning the centre of the mountain into sludge.

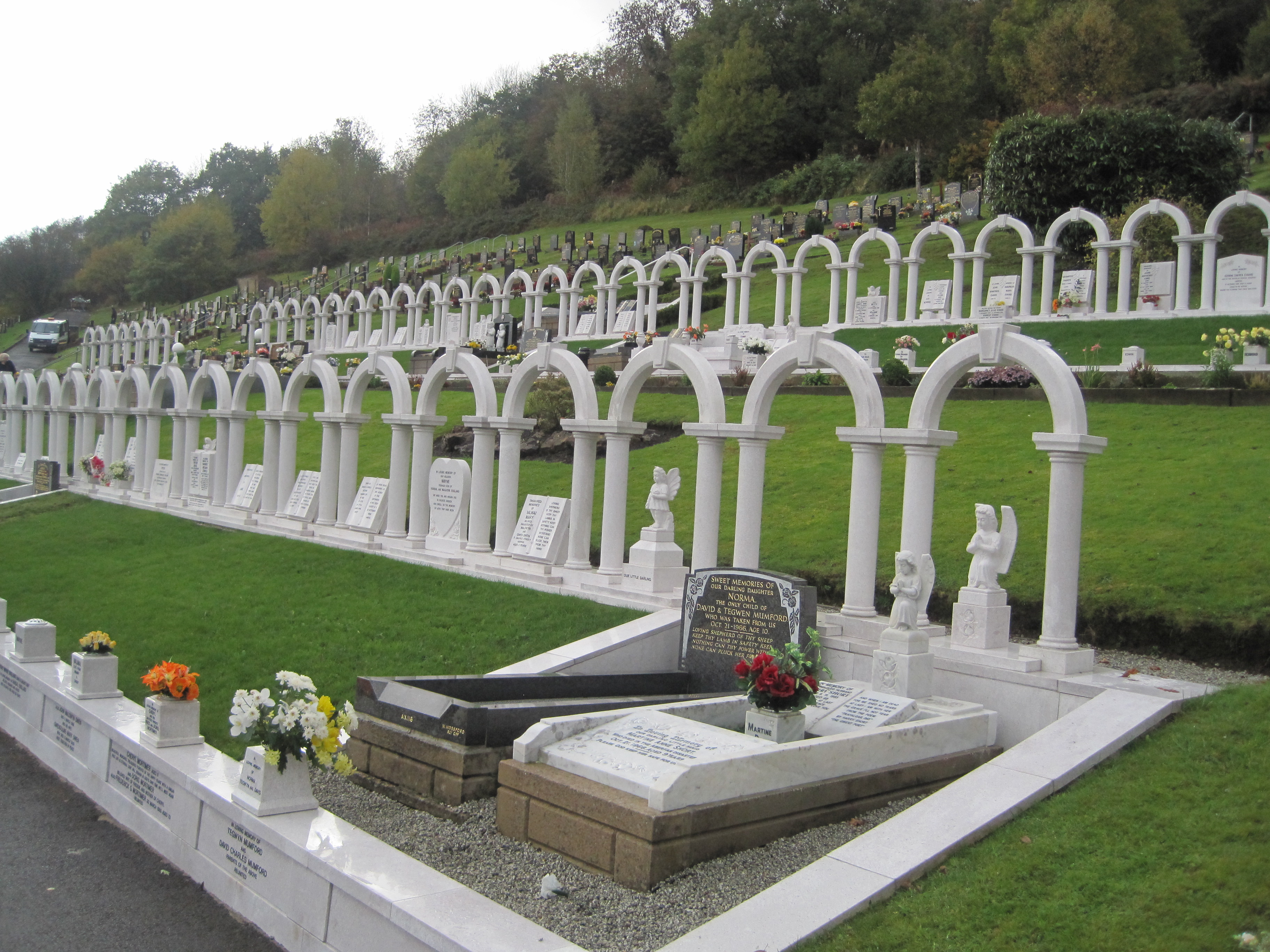
The white arches in Bryntaf Cemetery, Aberfan, which mark the graves of children killed in the disaster.

On 23 October assistance was provided by the Territorial Army. This was followed by the arrival of naval ratings from HMS Tiger and members of the King's Own Royal Border Regiment. That day Wilson announced the appointment of Lord Justice Edmund Davies as the chairman of the inquiry into the disaster; Davies had been born and schooled in the nearby village of Mountain Ash. A coroner's inquest was opened on 24 October to give the causes of death for 30 of the children located. One man who had lost his wife and two sons called out when he heard their names mentioned: "No, sir—buried alive by the National Coal Board"; one woman shouted that the NCB had "killed our children". The first funerals, for five of the children, took place the following day. A mass funeral for 81 children and one woman took place at Bryntaf Cemetery in Aberfan on 27 October. They were buried in a pair of 80-foot-long (24 m) trenches; 10,000 people attended.

Because of the vast quantity and consistency of the spoil, it was a week before all the bodies were recovered; the last victim was found on 28 October. (Note: There were two further deaths attributed to the disaster: a 19-year-old youth (the brother of a boy saved from the school) who collapsed and died from heart trouble while taking part in the rescue, and a 22-year-old soldier who had been assisting with the clear-up who died while hitch-hiking back to his regiment.) The Queen and the Duke of Edinburgh visited Aberfan on 29 October to pay their respects to those who had died. Their visit coincided with the end of the main rescue phase; only one contracting firm remained in the village to continue the last stages of the clear-up.

== Aftermath ==
=== Aberfan Disaster Tribunal ===
On 25 October 1966, after resolutions in both Houses of Parliament, the Secretary of State for Wales formally appointed a tribunal to inquire into the disaster. Before the tribunal began, Elwyn Jones, the Attorney General, cautioned the media that commenting on matters to be investigated by the tribunal could lay them open to the same consequences as contempt of court. (Note: Challenged by John Hobson, an opposition MP, for trying to "stifle all comment" on the unlikely basis that an experienced judge could be swayed by it, the Attorney General was eventually persuaded by a backbencher of his own party to moderate his apparent initial position: speculation was unobjectionable, but issues must not be prejudged, and the "examination of potential witnesses on television and in the press" should be avoided.) Sitting alongside Lord Justice Davies on the inquiry were the civil engineer Harold Harding and Vernon Lawrence, the former Clerk to the Monmouthshire County Council. The inquiry had an initial public meeting on 2 November 1966 and took evidence in public for 76 days, spread over the next five months; during that time 136 witnesses testified. The tribunal report stated "much of the time of the Tribunal could have been saved if ... the National Coal Board had not stubbornly resisted every attempt to lay the blame where it so clearly must rest—at their door".

Aberfan's MP, S. O. Davies, gave evidence to the tribunal and stated that he had long held concerns that the tip "might not only slide, but in sliding might reach the village"; he added that he had not spoken out because he had "more than a shrewd suspicion that that colliery would be closed". Brian Gibbens, QC, the counsel for the National Union of Mineworkers (NUM), challenged Davies's evidence and stated that if the testament "is to be accepted as truthful and accurate in his recollection ... then he bears what must be one of the largest personal burdens of responsibility for the disaster". Gibbens requested that Davies's testimony be rejected, on the basis that he "never appreciated what in fact was the import of his words". The tribunal agreed, and stated that "we doubt that he fully understood the grave implication of what he was saying".

Initially the tribunal decided not to call Robens to testify—they took his comment to the media about the existence of the spring being unknown as hearsay, and thought that his evidence could not help. The counsel for the families, Desmond Ackner, QC, strongly criticised Robens for making the statement about the spring, saying it was "a public scandal"; he added that "at no stage throughout this Inquiry has the National Coal Board taken the initiative to correct this sentence". Ackner also criticised Robens's absence from the inquiry, saying that "no explanation has been proffered by or on behalf of Lord Robens and his absence, therefore, and in this regard has been conspicuous." The tribunal members decided that Robens should be able to defend his position and he was invited to attend. Under cross-examination by Ackner, Robens gave evidence inconsistent with that provided by the NCB, particularly on the point of whether the disaster was foreseeable; counsel for the organisation asked the tribunal to ignore Robens's testimony.

The tribunal concluded its hearings on 28 April 1967 and published its report on 3 August. Among their findings was that "[b]lame for the disaster rests upon the National Coal Board. ... This blame is shared (though in varying degrees) among the National Coal Board headquarters, the South Western Divisional Board, and certain individuals." They added that the "legal liability of the National Coal Board to pay compensation for the personal injuries (fatal or otherwise) and damage to property is incontestable and uncontested". In its introduction the inquiry team wrote that it was their

strong and unanimous view ... that the Aberfan disaster could and should have been prevented. ... the Report which follows tells not of wickedness but of ignorance, ineptitude and a failure in communications. Ignorance on the part of those charged at all levels with the siting, control and daily management of tips; bungling ineptitude on the part of those who had the duty of supervising and directing them; and failure on the part of those having knowledge of the factors which affect tip safety to communicate that knowledge and to see that it was applied.

Nine employees of the NCB were censured by the inquiry, with "many degrees of blameworthiness, from very slight to grave", although some senior staff whom the evidence shows to have been culpable were omitted, and one junior member of staff named in the report should not have been blamed, according to Iain McLean, a professor of politics, and Martin Johnes, a research fellow in Welsh history. (Note: Those named in the report are: Unit Mechanical Engineer: as a mechanical engineer, he was not trained in ensuring tip stability. Although he was present when the site for Tip 7 was chosen, the committee thought he bore no responsibility for the choice made.; Manager, Merthyr Vale Colliery: not a civil engineer by training, although the tribunal considered it was "inconceivable that ...[he] should have failed to detect a most unusual state of affairs [at Tip 7] had he taken proper care".; Group Mechanical Engineer: a practical mechanical engineer, untrained in soil mechanics or tip stability. As someone who had selected four of the tip sites—including for Tips 4 and 7—the tribunal considered that he "must be blamed in some measure for starting tip 7". Although there had been slips previously, he had not considered or discussed the possible causes with anyone, which he should have done.; Group Manager: One of the three men who decided on the location of Tip 7. The tribunal stated that "ordinary intelligence should have alerted him to the fact that the new tip must be kept within a strictly limited area unless drainage and other problems were attended to", which they were not. He never visited the tips after making his decision, and the tribunal reported that "We cannot think that a Group Manager with a due sense of responsibility would have acted—or, rather, wholly failed to act—in all the circumstances as ...[he] knew them to be".; Area Mechanical Engineer: deemed a diligent worker, he was untrained in tip stability and had received no guidance on the matter from his superiors. He was criticised for not taking seriously letters from Merthyr Tydfil Council about the possibility of slippage, and for not liaising with the Area Civil Engineer about the tips. The tribunal reported that "All things considered, and although he is doubtless a good, overworked and conscientious man, ... [he] must shoulder a heavy portion of the blame for its occurrence."; Area Civil Engineer: he had visited the tip in April 1965 and, although he claimed not to have seen anything untoward, the tribunal considered that "it is impossible to understand how, with his trained eyes, he could have failed to detect those unusual signs visible in the photographs". Personal dislike of the Area Mechanical Engineer meant the two men did not liaise with one another, and the Area Civil Engineer should, like the Area Mechanical Engineer, take a heavy share of the blame.; Division Mechanical Engineer: in charge of the mechanical engineers who were supposed to oversee tip stability—among other duties. He had never visited the tips at Aberfan, despite having visited the colliery several times, and had even discussed alterations to tipping procedure there. Although he was aware of the potential of tips to cause fatalities through slippage, he did not discuss the matter with the right people, and "did nothing towards the curing of the situation", according to the tribunal report.; Chief Engineer (SW Division): had responsibility for tip management and control. The tribunal censured him for failing to question why there was no tipping policy, because he did not introduce relevant procedures, and to review what poor system was already in place.; Production Director (SW Division): although he was aware of previous slips in Welsh coalfields and of the potential for danger, he had not visited Merthyr Vale since 1960, and stated that he had not heard of the slip that occurred there in 1963. The tribunal stated that the failure to introduce a rigorous tipping policy "undoubtedly contributed materially to the disaster".) The tribunal decided that no blame lay with Merthyr Tydfil County Borough Council or the NUM.

The tribunal made several recommendations, including the need for the extension of the Mines and Quarries Act 1954 to cover tips, and the formation of a National Tip Safety Committee to advise the government. The inquiry report also advised that "action needs to be taken to safeguard the future condition of the tips at Aberfan".

The sociologist Barry Turner, in a 1976 study, identified several errors that led to the Aberfan disaster. These included years of rigid and unrealistic disregard for the importance of the safety of the above-ground tips (as opposed to dangers within the mines); a flawed decision-making process which ignored or minimised the likelihood and the scale of the emergent danger; a dismissive attitude toward the complaints from Aberfan residents, discounting the validity of their concerns; and an incomplete and inadequate response to conditions which caused those complaints.

McLean and Johnes observe that HM Inspectorate of Mines went largely unchallenged by the tribunal, although the two consider that the organisation failed in their duty; in doing so, they created a situation of regulatory capture, where rather than protecting the public interest—in this case the citizens of Aberfan—their regulatory failures fell in line with the interests of the NCB, the organisation they were supposed to be overseeing.

=== Aberfan residents ===
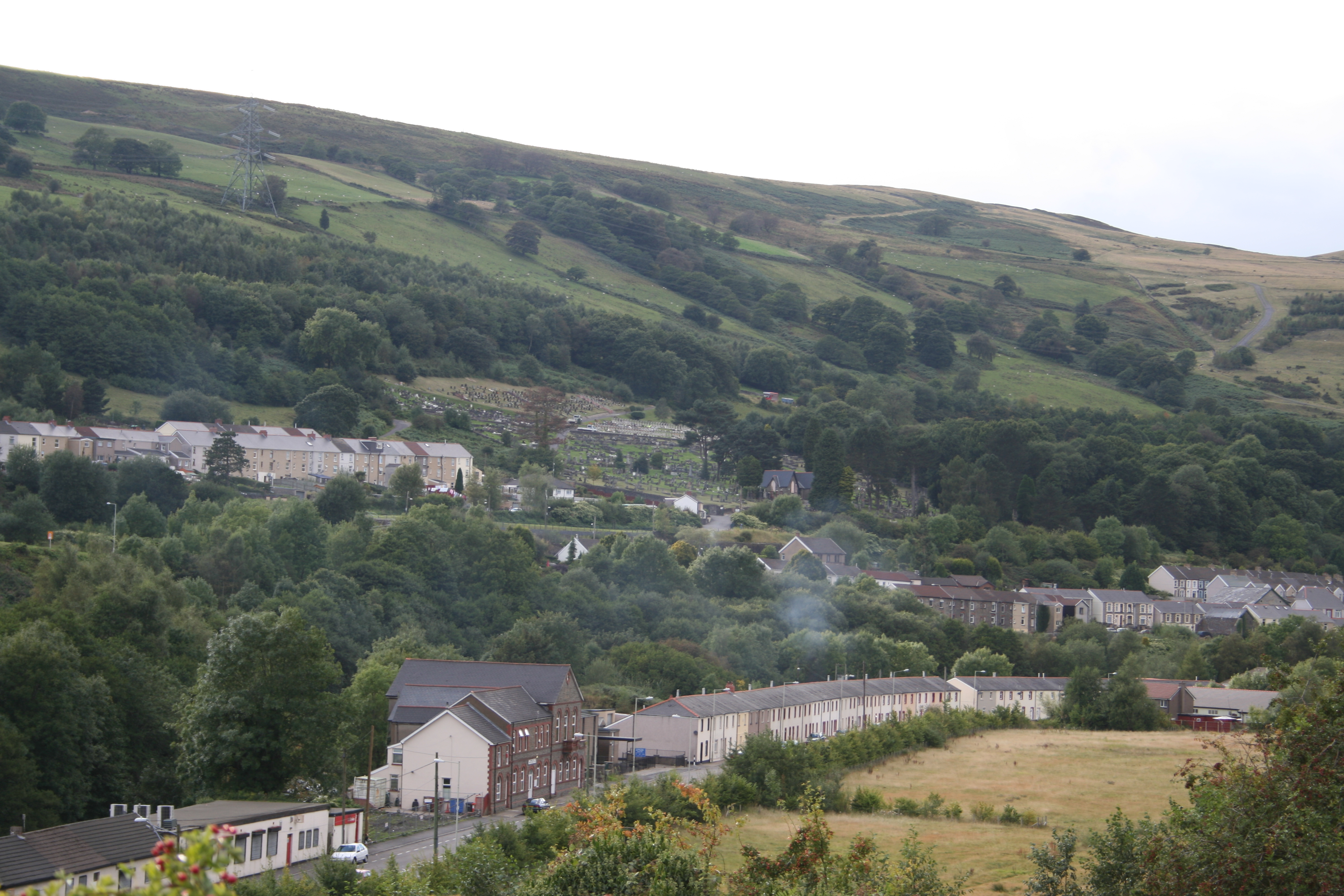
Aberfan in 2007; the cemetery is visible in the centre of the picture

During the rescue, the shock and grief of parents and villagers was exacerbated by insensitive behaviour from the media—one rescue worker recalled hearing a press photographer asking a child to cry for her dead friends because it would make a good picture. The response of the general public in donating to the memorial fund, together with over 50,000 letters of condolence that accompanied many of the donations, helped many residents come to terms with the disaster. One bereaved mother said "People all over the world felt for us. We knew that with their letters and the contributions they sent ... They helped us build a better Aberfan."

A study published in the British Journal of Psychiatry (BJP) in 2003 found that half the survivors of the disaster had experienced post-traumatic stress disorder (PTSD) at some time in their lives, that they were more than three times more likely to have developed lifetime PTSD than a comparison group of individuals who had experienced other life-threatening traumas, and that 34 per cent of survivors who took part in the study reported that they still experienced bad dreams or difficulty sleeping because of intrusive thoughts about the disaster. In 2005 Imperial Tobacco settled out of court to end an unfair dismissal suit brought against the company by an Aberfan survivor, who had been employed by the company's Rizla cigarette paper factory near Pontypridd. She had been sacked after she refused to continue working night shifts, stating that it had brought on flashbacks from 1966, when she had been buried waist-deep in the landslide while walking to school, and a friend who had been walking with her was killed.

The BJP study also found that there was no significant rise in the risk of depression or substance abuse in survivors. Some parents of deceased children reported extreme feelings of guilt, as did the pupils who survived, one of whom reported:

There was none of the discipline we used to have ... We didn't go out to play for a long time because those who'd lost their own children couldn't bear to see us. We all knew what they were feeling and we felt guilty about being alive.

The residents of Aberfan experienced medical problems after the disaster. Many survivors reported having "sleeping difficulties, nervousness, lack of friends, unwillingness to go to school and enuresis". In the year following the tip slide, close relatives of the victims had a death rate seven times higher than the norm. One local doctor later wrote "By every statistic, patients seen, prescriptions written, deaths, I can prove that this is a village of excessive sickness." Despite these problems, during the five years after the disaster the birth rate rose considerably, in marked contrast to that of Merthyr Tydfil.

=== NCB and its personnel ===
The NCB as an organisation was not prosecuted, (Note: Although it was possible in some circumstances for a corporate body to be prosecuted on some grounds, not until the passage of the Corporate Manslaughter and Corporate Homicide Act 2007 was it possible for an organisation to be found guilty of corporate manslaughter as a result of serious management failures resulting in a gross breach of a duty of care.) and no NCB staff were demoted, sacked or prosecuted as a consequence of the Aberfan disaster or for evidence given to the inquiry. During a parliamentary debate on the disaster, Margaret Thatcher—then the opposition spokeswoman on power—raised the situation of one witness, criticised by the inquiry, who had subsequently been promoted to a board-level position at the NCB by the time the report was published.

In 2000 McLean and Johnes undertook a study of the Aberfan disaster and its repercussions; their work included government papers released in 1997 under the thirty-year rule. Their opinion is that "the Coal Board 'spin-doctored' its way out of trouble, controlling the public agenda from the day of the disaster until the tips were finally removed". Robens had received a copy of the inquiry report ten days before its official publication and began a campaign to strengthen his position. He went on a tour of British coalfields, giving speeches that promoted the use of coal and criticised the increasing popularity of nuclear power. All messages of support to him were catalogued by the NCB, and copies of some were leaked to the press; the manoeuvring led to criticism in an editorial in The Guardian, which stated that "the Coal Board's behaviour has ... been rather unseemly in the circumstances".

In August 1967—following the publication of the inquiry report—Robens discussed his position with the Minister of Power, Richard Marsh. After receiving assurances that his role at the NCB was secure, he offered to resign; in line with the agreement between the two men, the offer was rejected. In parliament, the Welsh MP Leo Abse said that "when I saw what I regarded as the graceless pavane danced by Lord Robens and the Minister, as the Chairman of the Coal Board coyly offered his resignation and, equally coyly, the Minister rejected the offer, I thought that it was a disgraceful spectacle".

Initially the NCB offered bereaved families £50 in compensation, but this was raised to £500 for each bereaved family; (Note: £50 in 1967 equates to around £1,120 in 2023; £500 equates to around £11,200 over the same dates, according to calculations based on Consumer Price Index measure of inflation.) the organisation called the amount "a good offer and a 'generous donation'". Many families thought the amount insufficient and petitioned the NCB for an increase; NCB insurance staff advised Robens that "it is only the hard core [of bereaved parents] who are trying to capitalize".

=== Disaster fund ===
The fund set up by the mayor of Merthyr Tydfil grew rapidly, and within a few months nearly 88,000 contributions had been received, totalling £1,606,929; the final total raised was £1.75 million. (Note: £1.75 million in 1966 equates to a little under £30 million in 2017, according to calculations based on Consumer Price Index measure of inflation.) No specific aims for the fund had been outlined by the mayor until it was put on a firm legal footing under the auspices of a permanent committee with clear local representation. They drew up a deed that outlined the purposes of the fund as:

# For the relief of all persons who have suffered as a result of the said disaster and are thereby in need.

1. Subject as aforesaid for any charitable purpose for the benefit of persons who were inhabitants of Aberfan and its immediate neighbourhood (hereinafter called "the area of benefit") on the 21st day of October 1966 or now are or hereafter become inhabitants of the area of benefit and in particular (but without prejudice to the generality of the last foregoing trust) for any charitable purpose for the benefit of children who were on the 21st day of October 1966 or who now are or hereafter may become resident in the area of benefit.

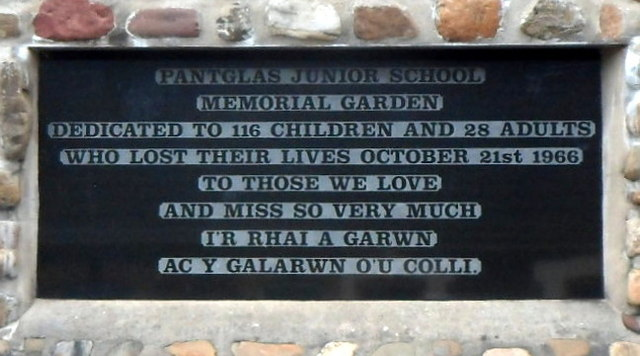
The dedication plaque at the Aberfan Memorial Garden

In 1967 the Charity Commission advised that any money paid to the parents of bereaved families would be against the terms of the trust deed. After arguments from lawyers for the trust, they agreed that there was an "unprecedented emotional state" surrounding Aberfan, and suggested that sums of no more than £500 should be paid. Members of the trust told the commission that £5,000 was to be paid to each family; the commission agreed that the amount was permissible, but stated that each case should be examined before payment "to ascertain whether the parents had been close to their children and were thus likely to be suffering mentally", according to one member of the Charity Commission. In November 1967 the commission threatened to remove trustees of the disaster fund or make a financial order against them if they made grants to parents of children who were physically uninjured but who were suffering mentally—some surviving children complained of being afraid of the dark and loud noises, while some refused to sleep alone; the commission informed them that any payments would be "quite illegal". The decision affected 340 physically uninjured children.

Other grants made by the trust were less controversial: for those who lost their house, or whose property suffered significant damage, the trust donated £100 to assist with evacuation, and additional funds to help replace damaged effects. (Note: £100 in 1967 equates to £1,600 in 2017, according to calculations based on Consumer Price Index measure of inflation.) £100,000 was set aside for the future needs of the eight children physically injured in the disaster, and £5,000 was placed in trust for them for when they came of age. (Note: £100,000 in 1967 equates to £1.63 million in 2017; £5,000 equates to just under £82,000 over the same dates, according to calculations based on Consumer Price Index measure of inflation.) The charity funded the building of a community centre in the village and a memorial garden, which was opened by the Queen in March 1973. The garden is on the site of Pantglas Junior School and includes stone walls to show where the classrooms stood.

McLean and Johnes consider that "the Commission protected neither donors nor beneficiaries. It was caught between upholding an outdated and inflexible law ... and fulfilling the varied expectations of donors, beneficiaries and the fund's management committee". In a study of the fund, the UK government Cabinet Office judged that "it is important to note that it did help in alleviating the suffering and was a focus for the grief of many". In 1988 the Aberfan Disaster Fund was separated into two entities: the Aberfan Memorial Charity and the Aberfan Disaster Fund and Centre, the second of which is administered by Merthyr Tydfil County Borough Council. The Aberfan Memorial Charity oversees the upkeep of the memorial garden and Bryntaf Cemetery, and provides financial assistance to "all those who have suffered as a result of the Aberfan Disaster by making grants of money or providing or paying for items, services or facilities calculated to reduce the need, hardship or distress of such persons".

=== Remaining tips and the fund ===
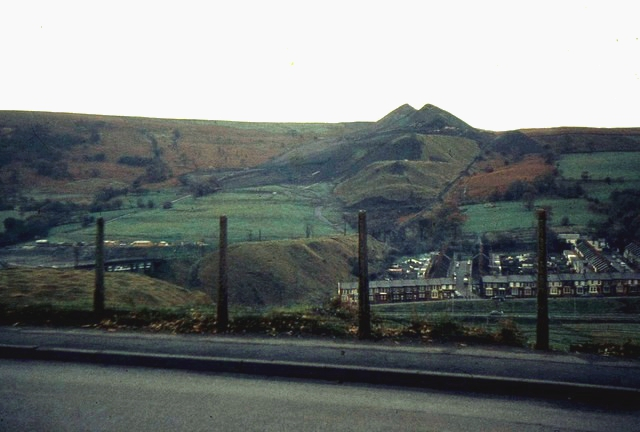
The spoil heaps at Aberfan in 1968. George Thomas, the Secretary of State for Wales, described them as "a psychological, emotional danger"; Tip 5 is furthest from the camera.

The tribunal report quoted one expert who said that Tip 5 "has been standing and is standing at a very low factor of safety"; the quote was read out by Thatcher in the October 1967 parliamentary debate on the inquiry report. S. O. Davies spoke in the debate on the same point:

We must be under no illusion that the Aberfan tips have been made safe by today. They have not been made safe. There are two tips right at the top of the old tip, to be seen glaring at us every day, full of threat. They might come down and cover some part of the village again. The Aberfan people insist—and I insist with them—that what is left of those tips must be removed. I hope that the Minister and the Secretary of State for Wales will be with us on this matter.

The residents of Aberfan petitioned George Thomas, who had succeeded Hughes as Secretary of State for Wales in April 1968, for the tips to be removed; they entered the Welsh Office and left a small pile of coal slurry on the table in front of him to make their point; Thomas later stated the tips "constitute a psychological, emotional danger" to the people of Aberfan. The NCB had received a range of estimated costs for removing the tips, from £1.014 million to £3.4 million. Robens informed HM Treasury that the cost would be £3 million, and informed them that the NCB would not pay for the removal; between November 1967 and August he lobbied to avoid having the NCB pay. The Chief Secretary to the Treasury also refused to pay, and said that the costs were too high. Although the government had initially favoured landscaping—an option cheaper than removal—they were eventually persuaded that removal was preferable.

To pay for the removal of the tips, £150,000 was taken from the disaster fund—lowered from the initial £250,000 first requested—the NCB paid £350,000 and the government provided the balance, with the proviso it was only up to a million. The final cost of the removal was £850,000. The trustees of the fund voted to accept the request for payment after realising that there was no alternative if they wanted the tips removed. S. O. Davies, the only member of the committee to vote against the payment, resigned in protest. There was a reminder of the danger for the residents of Aberfan when, in August 1968, heavy rain caused slurry to be washed down the village's streets. At the time, the Charity Commission made no objection to this action; the political scientists Jacint Jordana and David Levi-Faur consider the payment "unquestionably unlawful" under charity law.

=== Legislation ===
In 1969, as a result of concerns raised by the disaster, and in line with the findings of the tribunal report, the government framed new legislation to remedy the absence of laws and regulations governing mine and quarry spoil tips. The long title of the Mines and Quarries (Tips) Act 1969 was "An Act to make further provision in relation to tips associated with mines and quarries; to prevent disused tips constituting a danger to members of the public; and for purposes connected with those matters". The Act was an extension of the earlier Mines and Quarries Act 1954, which did not legislate over tips. According to McLean and Johnes, "the general commitment to public safety that the Tribunal had envisaged was not implemented" through the act, as the tribunal had advised wider legislation that should "consider the safety, health and welfare of all persons going about their lawful business in the vicinity of a mine, including the safety of their property".

In May 1970 Barbara Castle, the Secretary of State for Employment and Productivity, appointed Robens to chair the Committee on Health and Safety at Work, to review legislation in the area and recommend the provisions that should be made for workers and the general public. In 1972 the committee published its findings in the Robens Report which led to the creation of the Health and Safety at Work etc. Act 1974 and the formation of the Health and Safety Commission and the Health and Safety Executive.

== Legacy ==
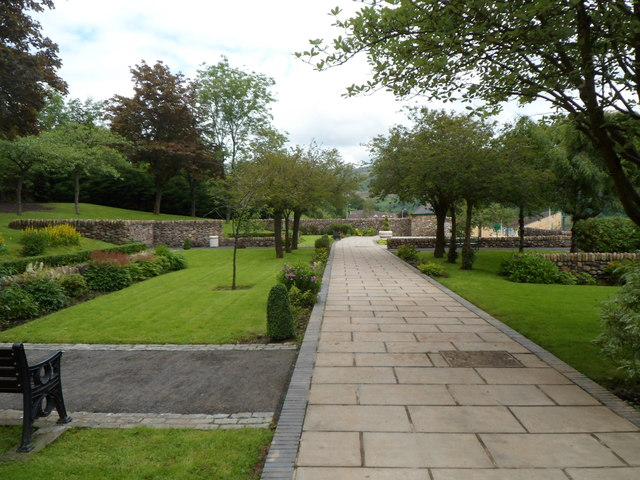
Aberfan Memorial Garden in March 2012

In addition to news and historical coverage, the Aberfan disaster and its aftermath have been described in books, including histories of what happened, personal memoirs from those involved and collections of poetry, in music, song and on screen. (Note: In print: Aberfan (October 1966) a prose poem by Dennis Potter in New Society.; Aberfan: Under the Arc Lights (1966) a poem by Keidrych Rhys.; Dagrau Tost: Cerddi Aber-fan (Welsh for 'Bitter Tears: Aberfan Poems'); 2016), edited by Christine James and E. Wyn James, is a collection of over 80 poems written between 1966 and 2016.; The Riddle of the Pyramids (1974) by the archaeologist Kurt Mendelssohn, who found a clue to the construction of the Egyptian pyramids in the physics of the Aberfan disaster.; How Far Can You Go? (1980), a novel by David Lodge.; In music: "Palaces of Gold" (1968), a song by Leon Rosselson.; "Aberfan" (1973), a song by David Ackles.; Aberfan (1977), a television opera by Raymond and Beverly Pannell.; "Not All The Flowers Grow" (2001), a song by Dave Cousins.; Cantata Memoria: For the Children (2016), a choral work by Karl Jenkins, with libretto by Mererid Hopwood, was written for a memorial concert for the 50th anniversary of the disaster.; On screen: Aberfan – The Untold Story a BBC One Wales documentary shown in September 2006.; Aberfan: The Fight for Justice, a BBC One documentary on 18 October 2016.; Aberfan: The Green Hollow (2016), a BBC One Wales film written by the poet Owen Sheers.; Aberfan: A Concert to Remember, a broadcast of the work Cantata Memoria: For the Children.; Surviving Aberfan, a 2016 documentary on BBC Four.; "Aberfan", an episode of the third series of the Netflix drama The Crown.)

Merthyr Vale Colliery closed in 1989. In 1997 Ron Davies, the Secretary of State for Wales in the incoming Labour government, repaid to the disaster fund the £150,000 that it had been induced to contribute towards the cost of tip removal. No allowance was made for inflation or the interest that would have been earned over the intervening period, which would have been £1.5 million in 1997. The payment was made in part after Iain McLean's examination of the papers released by the government. In February 2007 the Welsh Government announced a donation of £1.5 million to the Aberfan Memorial Charity and £500,000 to the Aberfan Education Charity, which represented an inflation-adjusted amount of the money taken. The money to the memorial charity was used in the upkeep of the memorials to the disaster.

In May 1997 the Queen and the Duke of Edinburgh planted a tree at the Aberfan Memorial Garden. In October 2016, the fiftieth anniversary of the disaster, memorial events took place at the garden and at the cemetery; the Prince of Wales represented the Queen, and government ministers were present to pay tribute. At the time of the anniversary Huw Edwards, the BBC News journalist and presenter, described the need to continue learning lessons from Aberfan; he wrote:

What we can do, however—in this week of the 50th anniversary—is try to focus the attention of many in Britain and beyond on the lessons of Aberfan, lessons which are still of profound relevance today. They touch on issues of public accountability, responsibility, competence and transparency.

In August 2021 a memorial sculpture by the Welsh artist Nathan Wyburn was installed at the Rhondda Heritage Museum. In January 2022 there was a call to find a permanent home for the artefacts salvaged from the disaster. These included a clock which had stopped at the exact moment the disaster occurred. In February of the same year, the cemetery, together with the memorial garden and the area of the tip and its slide path, were listed on the Cadw/ICOMOS Register of Parks and Gardens of Special Historic Interest in Wales. The record of the Grade II* site describes it as being of "great national importance and meaning".

== Notes and references ==
=== Sources ===
- "1997: The Queen revisits Aberfan". BBC. 3 June 2012. Archived from the original on 1 December 2017.
- "Opening Night! Opera & Oratorio Premieres – Aberfan". Stanford University. Archived from the original on 23 April 2020.
- "Aberfan: A Concert to Remember". BBC. Archived from the original on 4 April 2018.
- "Aberfan Disaster – Financial Support for Individuals". Cabinet Office. Archived from the original on 28 January 2013.
- "The Aberfan Disaster Fund and Centre". The Charity Commission. Archived from the original on 1 October 2021.
- "The Aberfan Disaster, October 1966" (PDF). South Wales Police Museum. Archived (PDF) from the original on 22 August 2017.
- Aberfan: The Fight for Justice (Television production). BBC. 18 October 2016.
- "Aberfan: The Fight for Justice". BBC. Archived from the original on 25 October 2017.
- "Aberfan Inquiry Powers". The Times. 26 October 1966. p. 6.
- "The Aberfan Memorial Charity". The Charity Commission. Archived from the original on 1 October 2021.
- "'Aberfan Trauma' Case Settled". BBC News. 8 February 2005. Archived from the original on 26 June 2006.
- "Aberfan: The Untold Story". BBC. Archived from the original on 16 October 2016.
- Abernethy, Virginia (2005). Population Pressure and Cultural Adjustment. New Brunswick, NJ: Transaction Publishers. ISBN 978-1-4128-3158-1. Archived from the original on 23 April 2020.
- "About Corporate Manslaughter". Health and Safety Executive. Archived from the original on 9 September 2017.
- Abse, Leo, MP (26 October 1966). "Aberfan Disaster". Parliamentary Debates (Hansard). House of Commons. col. 1976–1983.
- Allen, Becky (1 April 2011). "Aberfan: decent men, led astray". Health and Safety at Work.
- Austin, Tony (1967). Aberfan: The Story of a Disaster. London: Hutchinson & Co. OCLC 751632264.
- Cadw. "Aberfan: Cemetery, Garden of Remembrance and Former Tip and Slide Area (PGW(Gm)69(MER))". National Historic Assets of Wales.
- Clark, Eric; Road, Alan (23 October 1966). "New slip feared as Aberfan hopes fade". The Observer. p. 1.
- "Committee on Safety and Health at Work (Robens Committee): Report and Papers". The National Archives. Archived from the original on 18 September 2017.
- Couto, Richard A. (June 1989). "Economics, Experts, and Risk: Lessons from the Catastrophe at Aberfan". Political Psychology. 10 (2): 309–324. doi:10.2307/3791650. JSTOR 3791650.
- Davey, Christopher J. (1976). "The Structural Failure of the Meidum Pyramid". The Journal of Egyptian Archaeology. 62: 178–179. doi:10.2307/3856360. JSTOR 3856360.
- Davies, Edmund (1967). Report of the Tribunal Appointed to Inquire into the Disaster at Aberfan on October 21st, 1966 (PDF). London: Her Majesty's Stationery Office. OCLC 209323. Archived (PDF) from the original on 11 March 2018.
- "Edmund-Davies, Baron". Who's Who. Archived from the original on 1 October 2021.(subscription required)
- Edwards, Huw (16 October 2016). "Aberfan was a man-made disaster. 50 years on, we must remember this". The Sunday Telegraph. Archived from the original on 21 October 2018.
- Frost, Denis (25 October 1966). "Four big questions at Aberfan". The Guardian. pp. 1, 16.
- Grice, Natalie (16 January 2022). "Aberfan: Permanent home sought for disaster artefacts". BBC News.
- Griffiths, Robert (1983). S. O. Davies: A Socialist Faith. Llandysul, Dyfed: Gomer Press. ISBN 978-0-85088-887-4.
- "High Praise for Regeneration of Merthyr Vale Colliery Site". Merthyr Tydfil County Borough Council. 16 December 2015. Archived from the original on 13 September 2017.
- Howe, Geoffrey (9 May 1968). "The Aberfan Disaster". The Medico-Legal Society. 36 (3): 107–121. doi:10.1177/002581726803600302. PMID 5702074. S2CID 32988493.
- "Is it a Resigning Matter?". The Guardian. 7 August 1967. p. 6.
- Johnson, Dennis (22 October 1966). "'Absolute power' for action". The Guardian. p. 1.
- Jones, Elwyn, Attorney General for England and Wales (27 October 1966). "Aberfan Disaster (Tribunal)". Parliamentary Debates (Hansard). House of Commons. col. 1315–1320.
- Jordana, Jacint; Levi-Faur, David (2004). The Politics of Regulation: Institutions and Regulatory Reforms for the Age of Governance. Cheltenham, Glos: Edward Elgar Publishing. ISBN 978-1-84542-067-3. Archived from the original on 23 April 2020.
- "Legislation & Policy: Mine Waste". British Geological Survey. Archived from the original on 3 January 2018.
- McLean, Iain; Johnes, Martin (September 1999). "Regulating Gifts of Generosity: the Aberfan Disaster Fund and the Charity Commission". Legal Studies. 19 (3): 380–396. doi:10.1111/j.1748-121X.1999.tb00101.x. S2CID 144579954.
- McLean, Iain (1999). "The Last Day Before Half-Term". Nuffield College, University of Oxford. Archived from the original on 23 June 2018.
- McLean, Iain; Johnes, Martin (2000). Aberfan: Government and Disasters. Cardiff: Welsh Academic Press. ISBN 978-1860-570-339.
- McLean, Iain (12 February 1999). "How Close Were you to your Dead Child?". Times Higher Education Supplement. Archived from the original on 7 February 2009.
- McLean, Iain (5 February 2007). "Aberfan: No End of a Lesson". History and Policy. Archived from the original on 27 May 2017.
- McLean, Iain (January 2009). "Lessons from the Aberfan Disaster and its Aftermath" (PDF). British Academy Review (12): 49–52. Archived (PDF) from the original on 22 August 2017.
- McLean, Iain. "Books About Aberfan". Nuffield College, University of Oxford. Archived from the original on 25 June 2018.
- "Memories stirred by Aberfan poetry collection". Cardiff University. 1 August 2016. Archived from the original on 21 August 2017.
- Miller, Joan (1974). Aberfan: A Disaster and its Aftermath. London: Constable. ISBN 978-0-0946-0360-8.
- Mines And Quarries (Tips) Act 1969 (PDF). London: Her Majesty's Stationery Office. 1969. Archived (PDF) from the original on 22 October 2018.
- Morgan, Louise; Scourfield, Jane; Williams, David; Jasper, Anne; Lewis, Glyn (June 2003). "The Aberfan Disaster: 33-Year Follow-Up of Survivors". British Journal of Psychiatry. 182 (6): 532–536. doi:10.1192/bjp.182.6.532. PMID 12777345.
- Morris, Steven (20 October 2016). "Aberfan: memorials mark 50 years since tragedy in Wales". The Guardian. Archived from the original on 13 September 2017.
- Morris, Steven (21 October 2016). "Aberfan: Prince of Wales among those marking disaster's 50th anniversary". The Guardian. Archived from the original on 13 September 2017.
- Nield, Ted (October 2016). "Tipping point". The Geological Society of London. Archived from the original on 12 August 2017.
- "No hiding by the Coal Board, says Lord Robens". The Observer. 23 October 1966. p. 1.
- Nunn, Charles (16 October 1987). "The Disaster of Aberfan". Police Review: 2069–2071.
- Owen, David (2011). South Wales Collieries: Volume 6: Mining Disasters. Stroud, Glos: The History Press. ISBN 978-0-7524-3564-0.
- "Peace Returns To Aberfan". The Times. 31 October 1966. p. 12.
- Petley, Dave (10 October 2016). "Special Report: Aberfan 50 Years On". New Civil Engineer. Archived from the original on 18 October 2016.
- "Poignant sculpture unveiled as memorial to the victims of Aberfan". Nation.Cymru. 1 August 2021.
- Potter, Dennis; Greaves, Ian; Rolinson, David; Williams, John (2015). "Aberfan". The Art of Invective: Selected Non-Fiction 1953-94. London: Oberon. ISBN 978-1-78319-203-8.
- Reichardt, Mary (2010). Between Human and Divine: The Catholic Vision in Contemporary Literature. Washington DC: Catholic University of America Press. ISBN 978-0-8132-1739-0. Archived from the original on 23 April 2020.
- Robens, Alfred (1972). Ten Year Stint. London: Cassell. ISBN 978-0-304-93874-2.
- "The Robens Report". Health and Safety Executive. Archived from the original on 16 September 2017.
- Rhys, Keidrych (28 October 1966). "Aberfan: Under the Arc Lights". The Spectator. Archived from the original on 4 November 2016.
- Sheers, Owen (9 October 2016). "Aberfan 50 years on: how best to remember the tragedy?". The Guardian. Archived from the original on 18 December 2016.
- Silver, Eric (8 August 1967). "Lord Robens's offer to resign not accepted yet". The Guardian. p. 1.
- "Strawbs Revival". South Wales Evening Post. 30 January 2004. p. 18.
- "Surviving Aberfan". BBC. Archived from the original on 28 September 2017.
- Thatcher, Margaret, MP (26 October 1967). "Aberfan Disaster". Parliamentary Debates (Hansard). House of Commons. col. 1991–1996.
- Thomas, George, Secretary of State for Wales (7 November 1968). "Mines and Quarries (Tips) Bill". Parliamentary Debates (Hansard). House of Commons. col. 1137–1199.
- Thorpe, Vanessa (17 November 2019). "How filming the agony of Aberfan for The Crown revealed a village still in trauma". The Observer. Archived from the original on 20 November 2019.
- "Trustees Report and Unaudited Financial Statements for the Year Ended 31 March 2017 for the Aberfan Memorial Charity" (PDF). The Charity Commission. Archived from the original (PDF) on 29 September 2017.
- Turner, Barry (September 1976). "The Organizational and Interorganizational Development of Disasters". Administrative Science Quarterly. 21 (3): 378–397. doi:10.2307/2391850. JSTOR 2391850.
- Tweedale, Geoffrey (2004). "Robens, Alfred, Baron Robens of Woldingham (1910–1999)". Oxford Dictionary of National Biography (online ed.). Oxford University Press. doi:10.1093/ref:odnb/72445. (Subscription, Wikipedia Library access or UK public library membership required.)
- Watkins, Michael (17 October 1986). "Scarred by the Lost Generation". The Times. p. 14.
- "Welsh Judge to Head Aberfan Inquiry". The Times. 24 October 1966. p. 1.
- "Welsh Valleys Mourn the Children of Aberfan". The Times. 28 October 1966. p. 9.
- Wilkinson, Richard G. (2002). Unhealthy Societies: The Afflictions of Inequality. London: Routledge. ISBN 978-1-134-87280-0. Archived from the original on 23 April 2020.
- Williams, G. M. J. (1969). "Inquiry into the Aberfan Disaster". In Penman, A. D. M. (ed.). A Selection of Technical Reports Submitted to The Aberfan Tribunal. London: Her Majesty's Stationery Office. pp. 91–116. OCLC 877759092.
- Williams, Katherine; Williams, Justin A. (2016). The Cambridge Companion to the Singer-Songwriter. Cambridge: Cambridge University Press. ISBN 978-1-107-06364-8. Archived from the original on 23 April 2020.
- Williams, R. M.; Parkes, C. Murray (10 May 1975). "Psychosocial Effects of Disaster: Birth Rate in Aberfan". The British Medical Journal. 2 (5966): 303–304. doi:10.1136/bmj.2.5966.303. PMC 1681910. PMID 1131520.
- Williamson, Nigel (2008). The Rough Guide to the Best Music You've Never Heard. London: Rough Guides. ISBN 978-1-84836-003-7. Archived from the original on 15 February 2017.
- Wroe, Jo (27 October 2016). "The Unsung Heroes of Aberfan". New Statesman. Archived from the original on 26 August 2017.
