= Angela Kwok =

Welsh community activist

- Born: Hong Kong
- Died: 2016; Wales
- Known for: Community activist

Angela Kwok was a community champion for the Chinese community in Cardiff, Wales. From the 1970s to 2000s she helped isolated Chinese people in South Wales through founding societies and organising social events and translation services. In 2020 a Purple Plaque was installed on her family home in Cardiff to commemorate her.

== Personal life ==
Angela Kwok was born in 1955. She arrived in Cardiff from Hong Kong in the early 1970s when she was 16. She worked in her family's restaurant, the Rice Bowl that was the first Chinese restaurant in Cardiff. By the time she was 19 she was married and they had a daughter. The family ran a take-away, the Bamboo Garden in Pontcanna, Cardiff. She died in 2016.

== Community championship ==
Kwok initially spoke little English. Her situation, of long working days at unsocial hours with no support network, leaving her isolated from both the Chinese and indigenous communities, was similar to other wives. Despite some community opposition, Kwok initiated opportunities for the women to meet up to improve their English and computer skills and also, importantly, to make social contacts and friends.

In the 1984 Kwok established the South Wales Chinese Women's Association. Members helped each other with language translation and support such as at medical appointments. In the 1990s she formed a new organisation, the Cardiff Chinese Community Service Association for men as well as women. She also helped South Wales Police with translation, became a member of the Race Equality Council, and helped found the Chinese Cemetery in Pantmawr, Cardiff. In addition, she helped students from China who were studying in Cardiff. In 2008 she led fund-raising to aid those affected by the Sichuan earthquake.

== Awards ==
In 2013, Kwok was awarded a Welsh Asian Women Achievement Awards in a ceremony in City Hall, Cardiff in recognition of the interpretation and translation services she had set up.

In 2020 a Purple Plaque was installed on the Bamboo Garden takeaway in Pontcanna, Cardiff in recognition of the impact of her life.
