= Edmund Davies, Baron Edmund-Davies =

British judge (1906-1992)

The Right Honourable The Lord Edmund-Davies PC
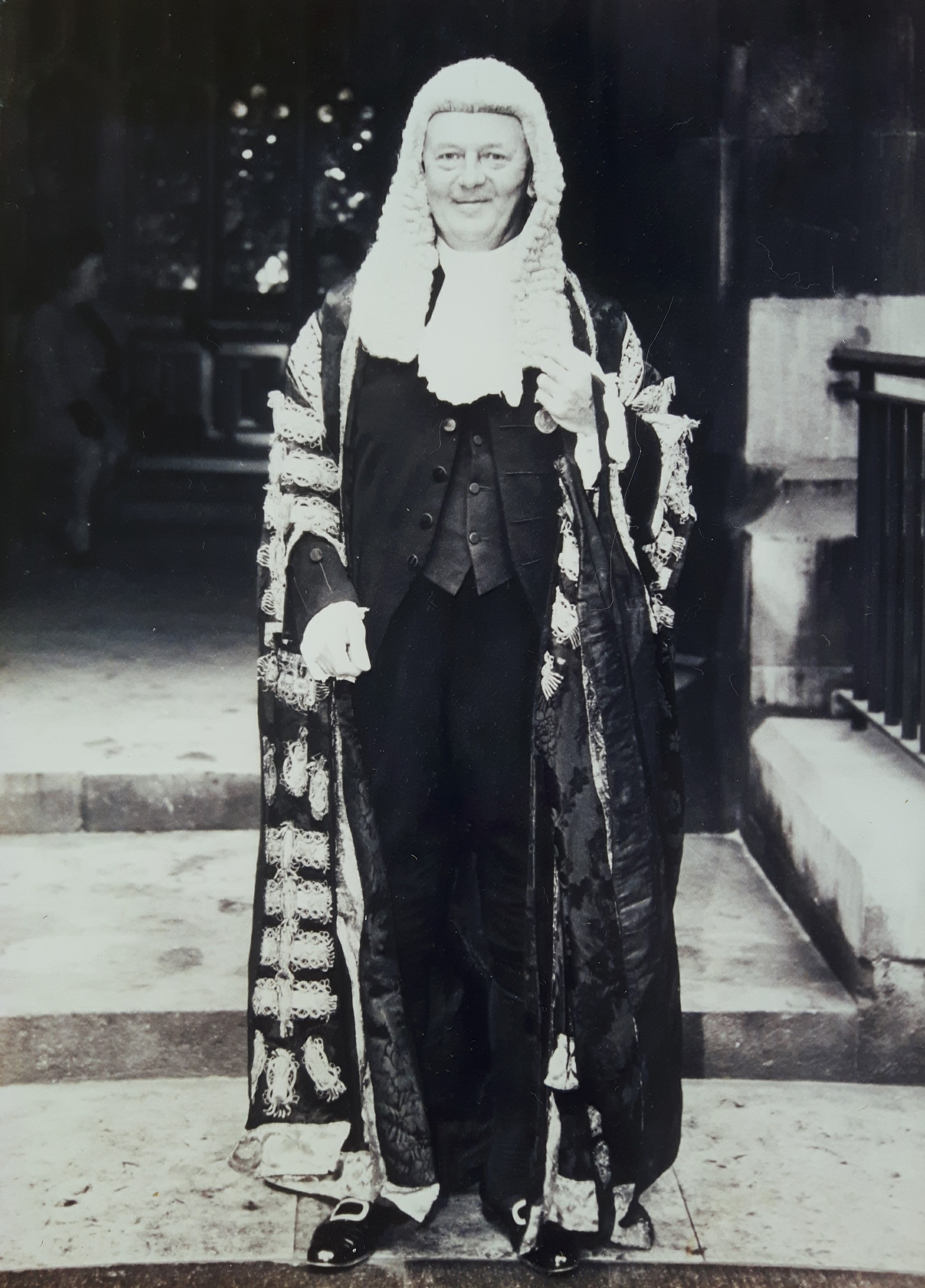

Lord of Appeal in Ordinary
- In office 1 October 1974 – 1981

Personal details
- Born: 15 July 1906 Mountain Ash, Glamorgan, Wales
- Died: 26 December 1992 (aged 86)

Herbert Edmund Edmund-Davies, Baron Edmund-Davies, PC (15 July 1906 – 26 December 1992) was a British judge.

== Early life and career ==
Born Herbert Edmund Davies at Mountain Ash (Welsh: Aberpennar), Glamorgan (now in Rhondda Cynon Taf), Wales, he was the third son of Morgan John Davies and Elizabeth Maud Edmunds. Davies was educated at Mountain Ash Grammar School, King's College London where he received a first-class LLB and an LLB in 1926 and an LLD in 1928. Following this, he completed the BCL in 1929 at Exeter College, Oxford, where he received the Vinerian Scholarship.

Called to the bar at Gray's Inn in 1929, he worked as examiner and lecturer at the London School of Economics in 1930 and 1931. During the Second World War, he served in the Army Officers' Emergency Reserve and in the Royal Welch Fusiliers. He was Recorder of Merthyr Tydfil from 1942 to 1944, of Swansea from 1944 to 1953 and of Cardiff from 1953 to 1958. Between 1953 and 1964, Davies was chairman of the Denbighshire Quarter Sessions.

== Judicial career ==
He was knighted in 1958 (becoming Sir Edmund Davies) when the Lord Chancellor, Lord Kilmuir appointed him a High Court Judge of the Queen's Bench Division (as Mr Justice Edmund Davies), a post he held until 1966. Davies's name almost immediately attracted public attention when it fell to him to try a German named Guenther Podola, who had shot and killed a police sergeant; Podola was convicted of capital murder and hanged in November 1959. In 1964 he was sent to Aylesbury to try the notorious Great Train Robbery (1963) case. The severity of the sentences he passed became and has remained controversial.

Sworn of the Privy Council in 1966, he was a Lord Justice of Appeal (as Lord Justice Edmund Davies) from 1966 to 1974. In 1967 he was appointed by the Secretary of State for Wales as chair of the Aberfan Disaster Tribunal. On 1 October 1974, he was appointed a Lord of Appeal in Ordinary ("Law Lord") and was raised to the Peerage as Baron Edmund-Davies, of Aberpennar in the County of Mid Glamorgan. He changed his surname to "Edmund-Davies", so that his given name, which had formed part of his judicial title for more than 15 years, could be incorporated into his peerage title.

Following very severe problems with the recruitment and retention of police officers in England and Wales because of chronically low pay, which had by then fallen far behind the pay for comparable occupations, in August 1977 Edmund-Davies was appointed by Labour Home Secretary Merlyn Rees MP to chair a commission of inquiry into the negotiating machinery for police pay and conditions. His terms of reference were enlarged in December 1977 to include the levels of pay. His report was published in July 1978 and recommended a substantial increase in pay for police officers – of the order of 45 per cent. His recommendations were implemented in full in 1979 by the incoming Conservative Government, and the essential elements of the Edmund-Davies pay regime have remained undisturbed ever since. The Edmund-Davies review has become a cornerstone for police pay and the Police Federation of England and Wales – the representative body for police officers up to and including the rank of Chief Inspector – has tenaciously held onto the Edmund-Davies regime.

In 1981, Edmund-Davies retired as a Law Lord. From 1974 to 1985, he was Pro-Chancellor of the University of Wales. Edmund-Davies was President of the London Welsh Trust, which runs the London Welsh Centre, from 1982 until 1988.

== Family ==
In 1935, he married Eurwen Williams-James. They had three daughters.

== Famous judgments ==
- R v Collins [1972] 2 All ER 1105
- Spartan Steel & Alloys Ltd v Martin & Co (Contractors) Ltd [1973] QB 27 (dissenting)
- Wilson v Racher [1974] ICR 428
- Whitehouse v Lemon; Whitehouse v Gay News Ltd [1979] AC 406, [1979] 2 WLR 281, [1979] 1 All ER 898

== Arms ==
Coat of arms of Edmund Davies, Baron Edmund-Davies

Notes
Displayed in a painting at Gray's Inn.
Crest
A full bottomed wig Proper.
Escutcheon
Argent a mountain ash tree eradicated and fructed Proper a bordure nebuly Sable.
Supporters
Dexter a drago Gules and sinister a griffin Or each resting the interior foot on a Celtic cross Argent.
Motto
Anelan Uchel

== Notes ==
Academic offices
Preceded by Sir John Williams	President of the University College of Wales Aberystwyth; 1926–1944	Succeeded by Thomas Jones
Preceded by ?	Pro-Chancellor of the University of Wales; 1975–1984	Succeeded by Cledwyn Hughes
