= Aberfan =

Coordinates: 51°41′30″N 03°20′44″W

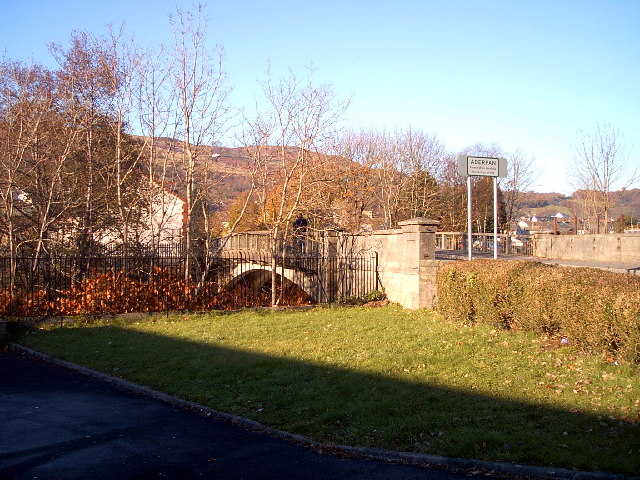
- South entrance to Aberfan in November 2005

- Location within Merthyr Tydfil
- Population: 2,400 (2021 Census)
- OS grid reference: SO070002
- Community: Merthyr Vale
- Principal area: Merthyr Tydfil
- Preserved county: Mid Glamorgan
- Country: Wales
- Sovereign state: United Kingdom
- Post town: Merthyr Tydfil
- Postcode district: CF48
- Dialling code: 01443
- Police: South Wales
- Fire: South Wales
- Ambulance: Welsh
- UK Parliament: Merthyr Tydfil and Aberdare
- Senedd Cymru – Welsh Parliament: Merthyr Tydfil and Rhymney

Aberfan (Welsh pronunciation: [ˌabɛrˈvan]) is a former coal mining village in the Taff Valley 4 mi (6 km) south of the town of Merthyr Tydfil, Wales, in the community of Merthyr Vale, in the principal area of Merthyr Tydfil.

On 21 October 1966, in the Aberfan disaster, a colliery spoil tip collapsed into homes and a school, killing 116 children and 28 adults.

== Geography ==
Aberfan is situated toward the bottom of the western valley slope of the River Taff, on the eastern slope of Mynydd Merthyr hill, about four miles (6 km) south of the town Merthyr Tydfil. The Taff runs north-to-south through the village; at the upper side of the settlement, on the western outskirts, a disused Glamorganshire Canal bed and a railway embankment run parallel to the river.

== History ==
Aberfan consisted of two cottages and an inn frequented by local farmers and bargemen until 23 August 1869, when John Nixon and his partners started the Merthyr Vale Colliery.

Between 1952 and 1965, with mountains denuded there was severe flooding in the Pantglas area of Aberfan on at least 11 occasions. By 1966 the population had grown to approximately 5,000, most of whom were employed in the coal industry.

=== Aberfan disaster, 1966 ===
For many years, millions of cubic metres of excavated mining debris from the colliery were deposited on the side of Mynydd Merthyr, directly above the village of Aberfan on the opposite side of the valley. Huge piles, or "tips", of loose rock and mining spoil had been built up over a layer of highly porous sandstone that contained numerous underground springs, and several tips had been built up directly over these springs. Although local authorities had raised specific concerns in 1963 about spoil being tipped on the mountain above the village primary school, these were largely ignored by the National Coal Board's area management.

Early on the morning of Friday, 21 October 1966, after several days of heavy rain, a subsidence of about 3–6 metres occurred on the upper flank of colliery waste tip No. 7. At 9:15 a.m. more than 150,000 cubic metres of water-saturated debris broke away and flowed downhill at high speed. A mass of over 40,000 cubic metres of debris slid into the village in a slurry 12 m (39 ft) deep.

The slide destroyed a farm and 20 terraced houses along Moy Road, and struck the northern side of the Pantglas Junior School and part of the separate senior school, demolishing most of the structures and filling the classrooms with thick mud and rubble up to 10 m (33 ft) deep. Mud and water from the slide flooded many other houses in the vicinity, forcing many villagers to evacuate their homes.

In total, 116 children and 28 adults were killed.

== Aberfan memorials ==
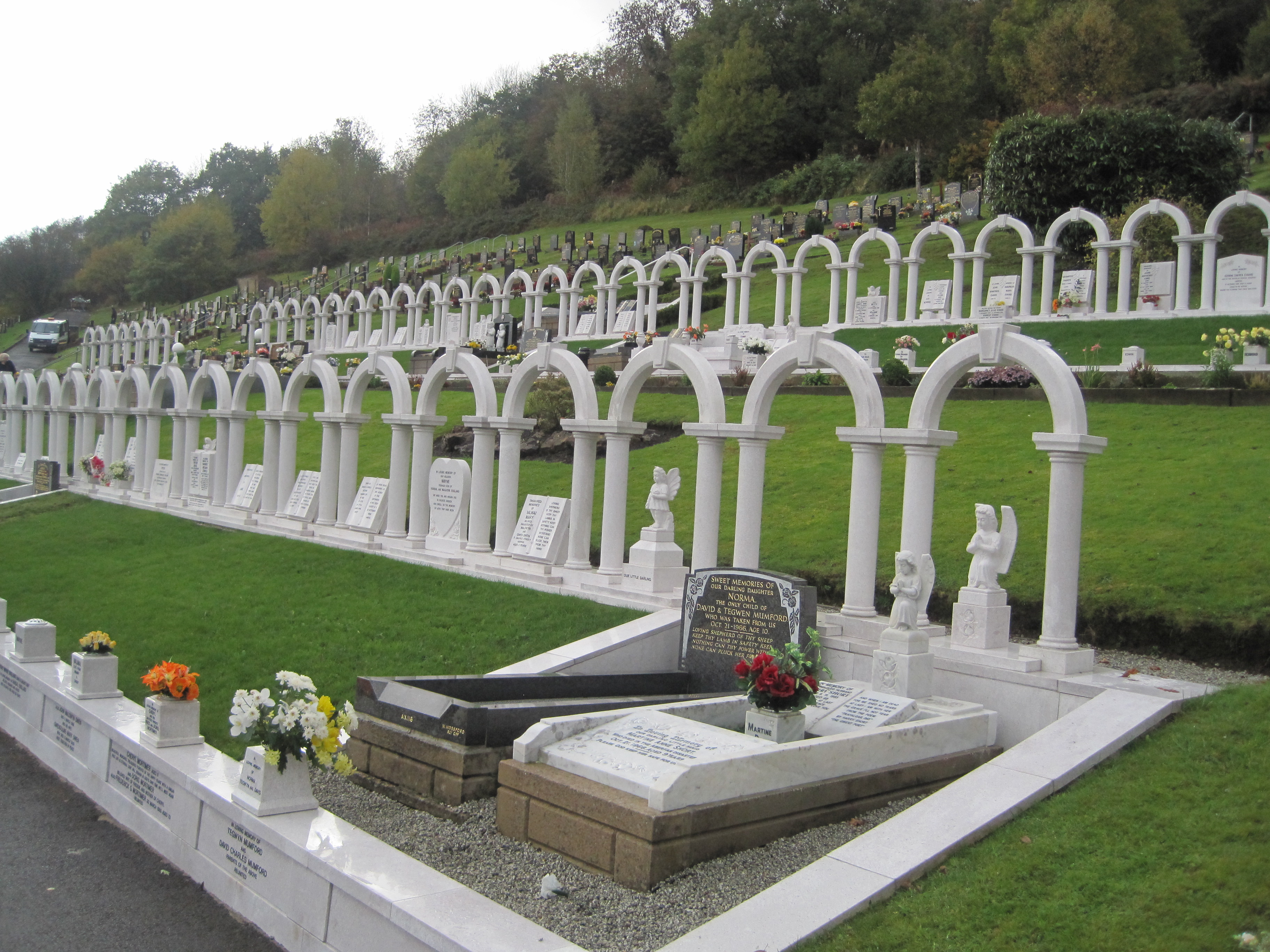
White arches in Bryntaf Cemetery, Aberfan, mark the graves of the children killed in the disaster

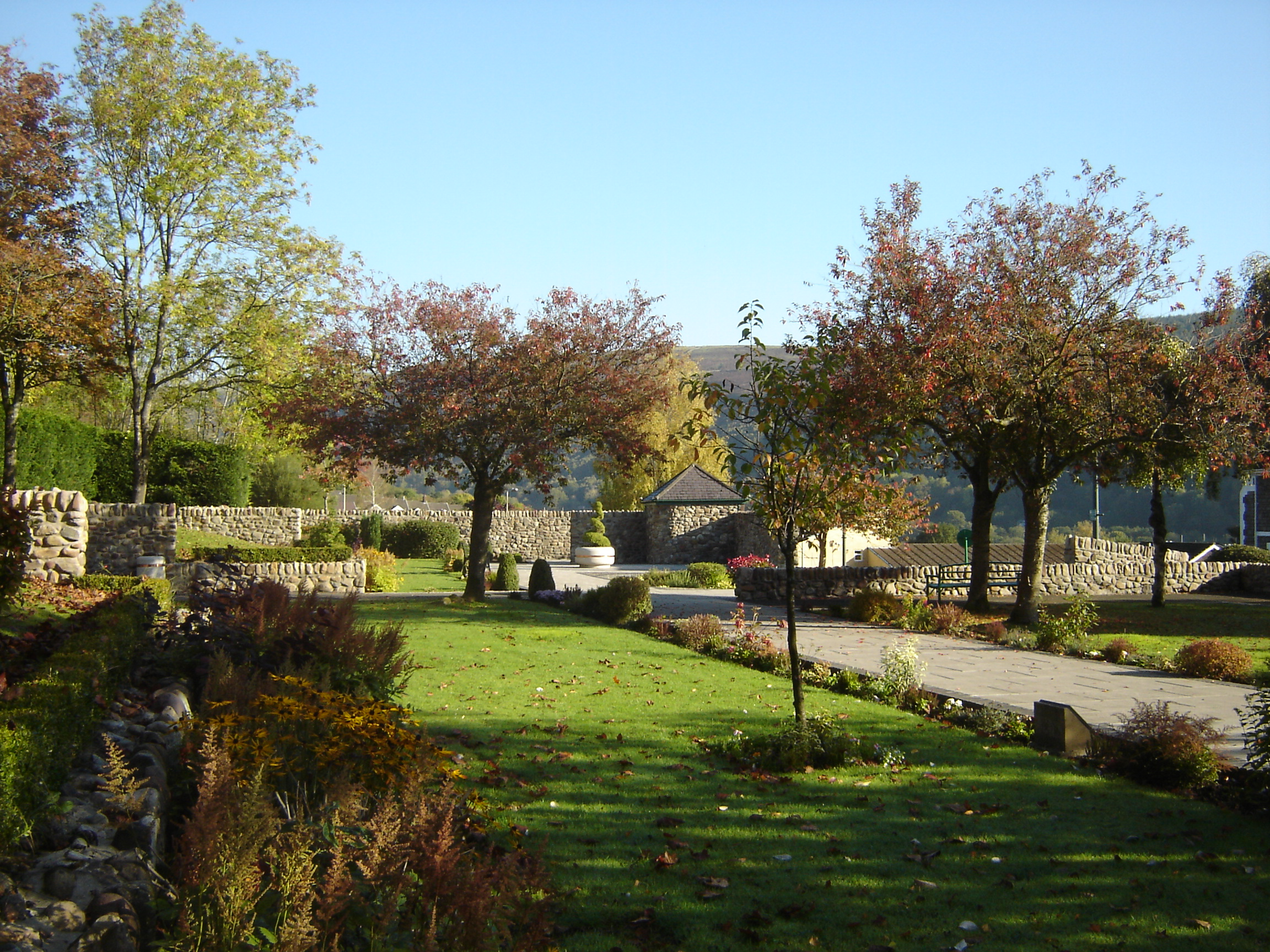
Aberfan Memorial Garden on the site of the children's school

Queen Elizabeth II and Prince Philip, Duke of Edinburgh visited Aberfan on 29 October 1966.

After the disaster, the mayor of Merthyr immediately launched a disaster fund to aid the village and the bereaved. By the time the fund closed in January 1967, nearly 90,000 contributions had been received, totalling £1,606,929. The fund's final sum was approximately £1,750,000 (equivalent to £28 million in 2025). The concerns of the village and donors grew about how the money in the fund would be used: some felt it should be used to compensate the bereaved, whilst others felt it should benefit the wider community. The funds paid for the memorial garden and cemetery along with other facilities to aid the regeneration of Aberfan both physically and emotionally.

The Aberfan Cemetery is where many of the victims are buried. The original Portland and Aurisina limestone memorials erected shortly after the disaster began to deteriorate, and in 2007 the Aberfan Memorial Charity refurbished the garden area, including all of the archways and memorials. The weathered masonry was replaced with polished pearl white granite, all inscriptions were re-engraved and additional archways were erected. In 2022 the cemetery, together with the memorial garden and the area of the tip and its slide path, were listed on the Cadw/ICOMOS Register of Parks and Gardens of Special Historic Interest in Wales. The record of the Grade II* listed site describes it as being "of great national importance and meaning."

The Coventry Playground was built in 1972 on the site of the old Merthyr Vale School, with money collected by the people of Coventry. The playground was officially opened by the mayor of Coventry.

A memorial garden was opened on the site of Pantglas Primary School, which was destroyed during the disaster. The park was partly opened by the Queen, accompanied by the Duke of Edinburgh, on her visit to Aberfan in 1974.

The Aberfan Memorial Charity was founded in 1989 and is responsible for the maintenance and repair of the cemetery and memorial garden.

== Places of worship ==
Bethania Welsh Independent Chapel was built in 1876 and rebuilt in 1885. At the time of the Aberfan disaster in 1966 the chapel was used as a temporary mortuary where victims were taken to be identified by relatives. The chapel was demolished in 1967 and a new chapel erected in 1970. By 2007 the chapel had fallen into disrepair and was closed; memorial items from the disaster were relocated to Cardiff Bay.

Aberfan Calvinistic Methodist chapel was built 1876, in an Italianate style. The foundation stone was laid by Sarah Griffiths, wife of the owner of the Aberfan Estate. It became a Grade II listed building in August 1999. After the Aberfan disaster, the chapel was furnished with a memorial organ by the Queen. The chapel was restored in the early 21st century but an outbreak of dry rot saw a condemnation order by a buildings inspector and a refusal by the insurers to renew the building's insurance. In 2012, the building was offered for sale. A subsequent arson attack in 2015 caused yet further damage.

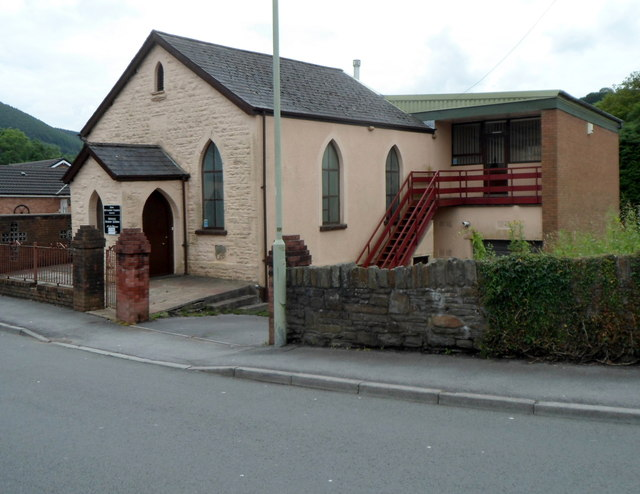
Zion Methodist Church

The village has two smaller chapels: the former Smyrna Baptist Chapel, built in 1877, which is now closed and is used as a community centre, and the Zion Methodist Chapel, originally English Primitive Methodist, located on Bridge Street and built in 1891.

== Transport ==
Aberfan lies next to the main A470 road, but its nearest junction is 4 mi (6.4 km) north of the village. Aberfan is served by Merthyr Vale railway station, on the Merthyr line. The Taff Trail, a long-distance cycle route and footpath, passes through Aberfan, partly following the route of the filled-in Glamorganshire Canal.

== Education ==
Aberfan has two primary schools: Ynysowen Primary School adjacent to the Grove Field; and Ysgol Gynradd Gymraeg Rhyd y Grug, which has moved to the previously occupied Ynysowen Primary School building.

== Facilities ==
- Aberfan & Merthyr Vale Community Centre: opened in 1973 with a swimming pool, fitness room, weights room, café and a hall.
- Aberfan Cemetery and Aberfan Disaster Memorial
