= Noddfa =

Noddfa (Welsh for 'sanctuary' or 'place of refuge') may refer to:

- Noddfa Chapel, Treorchy, Rhondda Cynon Taf, Wales
- Noddfa Chapel, Ynysybwl, Rhondda Cynon Taf, Wales
