= Abercynon =

Village and community in Wales

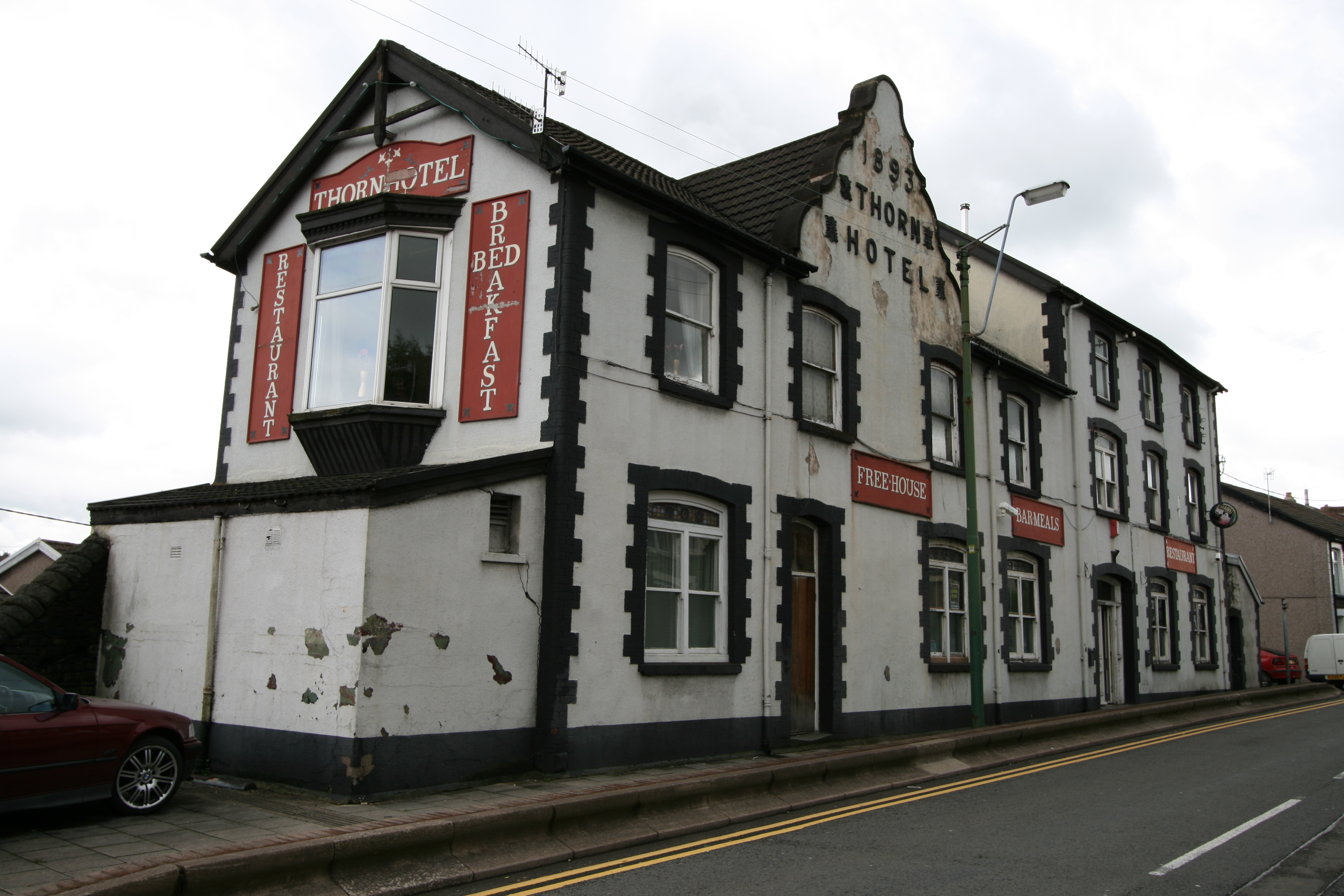
- Thorn Hotel, Abercynon

- Location within Rhondda Cynon Taf
- Population: 6,390 (2011)
- Community: Abercynon
- Principal area: Rhondda Cynon Taf
- Country: Wales
- Sovereign state: United Kingdom
- Post town: Mountain Ash
- Postcode district: CF45
- Police: South Wales
- Fire: South Wales
- Ambulance: Welsh
- UK Parliament: Pontypridd
- Senedd Cymru – Welsh Parliament: Cynon Valley
- List of places UK Wales Rhondda Cynon Taf 51.64449°N 3.32666°W Community map: Map of the community

Abercynon (Welsh pronunciation: [abɛrˈkənɔn]) is a village and community (and electoral ward) in the Cynon Valley within the unitary authority of Rhondda Cynon Taf, Wales. The community comprises the village and the districts of Carnetown and Grovers Field to the south, Navigation Park to the east, and Glancynon (or Aber-taf) to the north.

The population of Abercynon was recorded as 6,428 in the 2001 Census, decreasing to 6,390 at the 2011 Census, despite more than a hundred additional households built over this period (from 2,582 in 2011 to 2,694 by 2011). The electoral ward of Abercynon includes both the community of Abercynon, but also takes into account the nearby villages of Pontcynon, Ynysboeth and Tyntetown further north.

Abercynon is approximately 16 miles (26 km) north of Cardiff and approximately 40 miles (64 km) from Swansea. The rivers Taff and Cynon converge at Watersmeet near Martin's Terrace. Abercynon used to have many churches, chapels and pubs. There are now only four public houses left - The Thorn Hotel, The Navigation, The Top Club and the Carne Park Hotel. The only churches still left are St. Donat's Church in Wales, its daughter church, St. Gwynno's, St. Thomas' Roman Catholic Church and the Methodist church in Martin's Lane.

== Religion ==
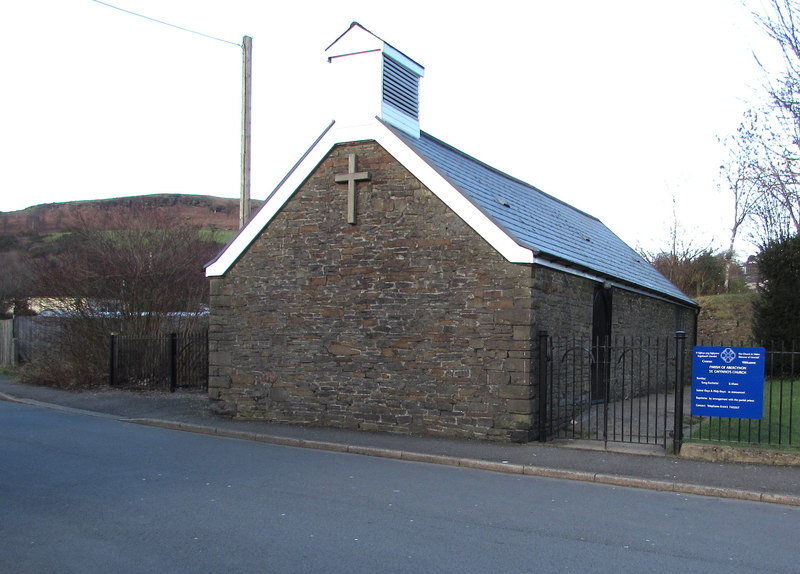
St Gwynno's Church

The Church in Wales church is St Gwynno and the Roman Catholic church is St Thomas. A shrine and a grotto were built in 1925 on the bank of the River Taff with links to St Thomas' church. It was the idea of Father Carroll Baillie, the first priest of Abercynon who came to minister to migrant Italian and Irish miners and the small local Welsh catholic population. It was built to occupy unemployed miners during the 1926 United Kingdom general strike. The miners used crowbars and ropes to haul huge blocks of stone from the riverbed, then strengthened the banks and terraces with a sloped wall. It was based on the shrine to Our Lady of Lourdes in France.

Abercynon had a number of nonconformist chapels that were established in the nineteenth century. Most had closed by 2000, including Bethania (Independent), Calfaria (Baptist) and Tabernacle (Calvinistic Methodist).

== Transport links ==
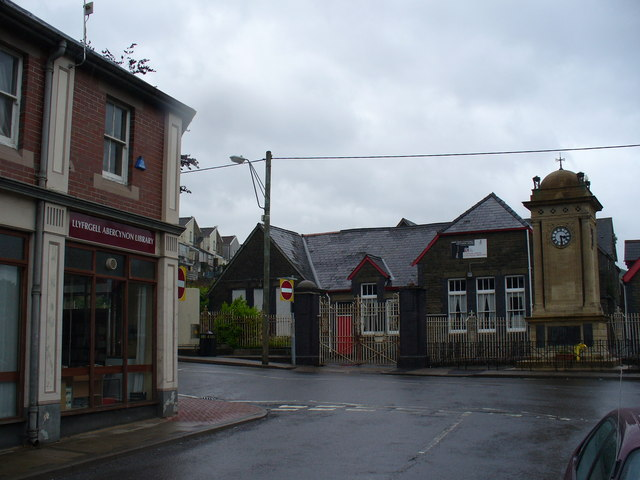

The village was the terminus of the world's first steam railway journey when on 21 February 1804 the inventor Richard Trevithick drove a steam locomotive hauling both iron and passengers travelled from the Penydarren ironworks in Merthyr Tydfil to the basin of the Glamorganshire Canal at Abercynon. There are memorials to Trevithick's journey at Penydarren and outside the fire station at Abercynon.

The village developed as a transport interchange being at the junction of the Merthyr and Aberdare branches of the Glamorganshire Canal and the Merthyr and Aberdare branches of the Taff Vale Railway. For a time it was known as "Navigation" and the Navigation Hotel, which was originally the headquarters of the Glamorganshire Canal, still bears this name.

Unusually for a village, until early 2008, it had two railway stations. One was on the line from Cardiff to Aberdare, namely Abercynon North. The other, Abercynon South, was on the Cardiff to Merthyr Tydfil line. Following major work, the North station was closed and its services moved to the South station, now named simply Abercynon. Trains are operated by Transport for Wales as part of the Merthyr Line service.

A park and ride scheme funded by the Welsh Assembly Government and the European Regional Development Fund and delivered by Rhondda Cynon Taf Council with capacity for 160 cars and free parking was opened in 2010. Designed by Capita Glamorgan Consultancy and supported by the then Arriva Trains Wales rail franchise and Network Rail, the park-and-ride facility was built on former scrubland situated between the River Taff and Abercynon Station. A new bridge with paved footways either side was built to link the park and ride with Navigation Business Park. A direct access through a new upgraded subway was also provided to Abercynon Station.

In 2018 Rhondda Cynon Taf Council announced proposals to expand the Park and Ride scheme at Abercynon Railway Station to provide more than 300 new parking spaces. A new parking facility will be built at Navigation Park, on the former Abercynon Colliery site a short walk from Abercynon Railway Station. It will include 310 new spaces including seven disabled bays and 15 motorcycle spaces and a bus stop will be added to the existing car park adjacent to the train station to encourage integration between bus and rail services. Rhondda Cynon Taf Council secured £787,000 from the Welsh Government's Local Transport Fund towards the overall cost of £1.2m.

Abercynon lies just off the A470 road between Pontypridd and Merthyr Tydfil. Other road links include the A472 road which provides a cross valley link to Ystrad Mynach and the A4059 road to Mountain Ash and Aberdare.

== Local collieries ==
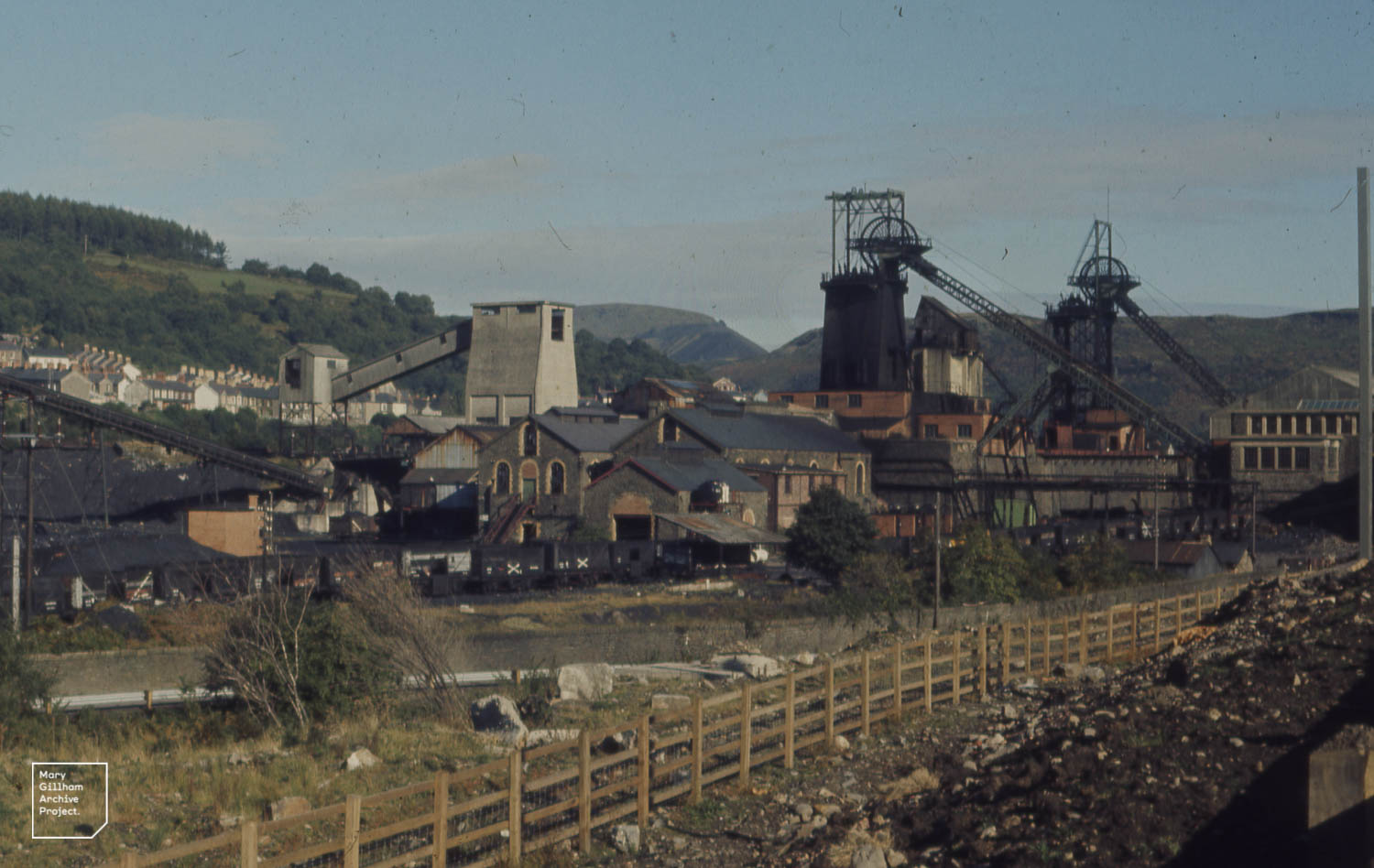
Abercynon Colliery in 1973

Abercynon Colliery was sunk by the Dowlais Ironworks in 1889 to supply a steel works in Cardiff. Employing nearly 3000 men and part of the Powell Duffryn empire pre-World War II, it was in 1973 joined with the Lady Windsor Colliery at Ynysybwl. Known as the Abercynon Lady Windsor Colliery, it closed in 1988. A memorial marks the location of the colliery in the Navigation Park.

== Education ==
Abercynon used to have three primary schools and a secondary school but this has now been reduced to one English medium school and one Welsh medium primary school. Local secondary schools are Pontypridd High School and Mountain Ash Comprehensive School with Cardinal Newman Roman Catholic School, Rhydyfelin and St John the Baptist School, Aberdare providing faith based education. Post-16 education is provided at Coleg y Cymoedd in Nantgarw with other campuses in Aberdare, Rhondda and Ystrad Mynach.

== Sport ==
Abercynon's rugby league side are called the Valley Cougars and play in the Welsh Conference Premier.

The local rugby union team is Abercynon RFC and during the 1970s the team won the Glamorgan County Silver Ball Trophy on two occasions.

Abercynon's suburb of Carnetown has the town's most successful football team, Carnetown FC, formally Carnetown Boys and Girls Club, with teams from mini age groups under 7's through to two senior teams.

Abercynon also has a leisure centre which opened in the 1970s. It is run by RCT Council who invested £1.7 million in 2016. Facilities include a 25-meter swimming pool, a gym, squash courts and sport halls.

An all-weather multi use 3G sports pitch at Y Parc Abercynon was opened by Rhondda Cynon Taf Council in 2018.

== Buildings and locations of note ==
Llancaiach Fawr Manor, a Tudor manor house, lies nearby.

The village of Abercynon is also home to the Thorn Hotel, which was once used by Tom Jones to practise his performances. He also used rooms at the now demolished Ynysmeirig Hotel, known locally as "The Spy", one of a number of pubs in the village now no longer in existence.

Abercynon Workingmen's Hall was once the largest in the South Wales coalfield, but was demolished in 1995. Being built on a steep hillside the height of the pine end wall was over 70 feet from base to roof apex, whilst the front wall was just 35 feet.

== 1913 tornado ==
On 28 October 1913, a 160 mph (260 km/h) tornado ripped through the Taff valley. It affected nearby settlements, Edwardsville, Treforest and Cilfynydd. Three deaths have been confirmed. Contemporary reports suggest that up to six people died.

== Notable people ==
- Vic Crowe, Welsh international footballer, who played for and later managed Aston Villa was born in Abercynon.
- Dai Dower, ABA flyweight boxing champion.
- George Ewart Evans, folklorist and oral historian.
- Howard Radford, a former goalkeeper for Bristol Rovers was born in Abercynon.
- Stephen Williams, Liberal Democrat MP for Bristol West grew up in Abercynon.
- David Thomas Jones attended the Navigation school 1902 to 1909 and was Member of Parliament for the Hartlepools 1945 to 1959
- Maldwyn Cooper, 6-time Canadian national wrestling champion - Commonwealth Games Bronze medalist was born in Abercynon

== Gallery ==
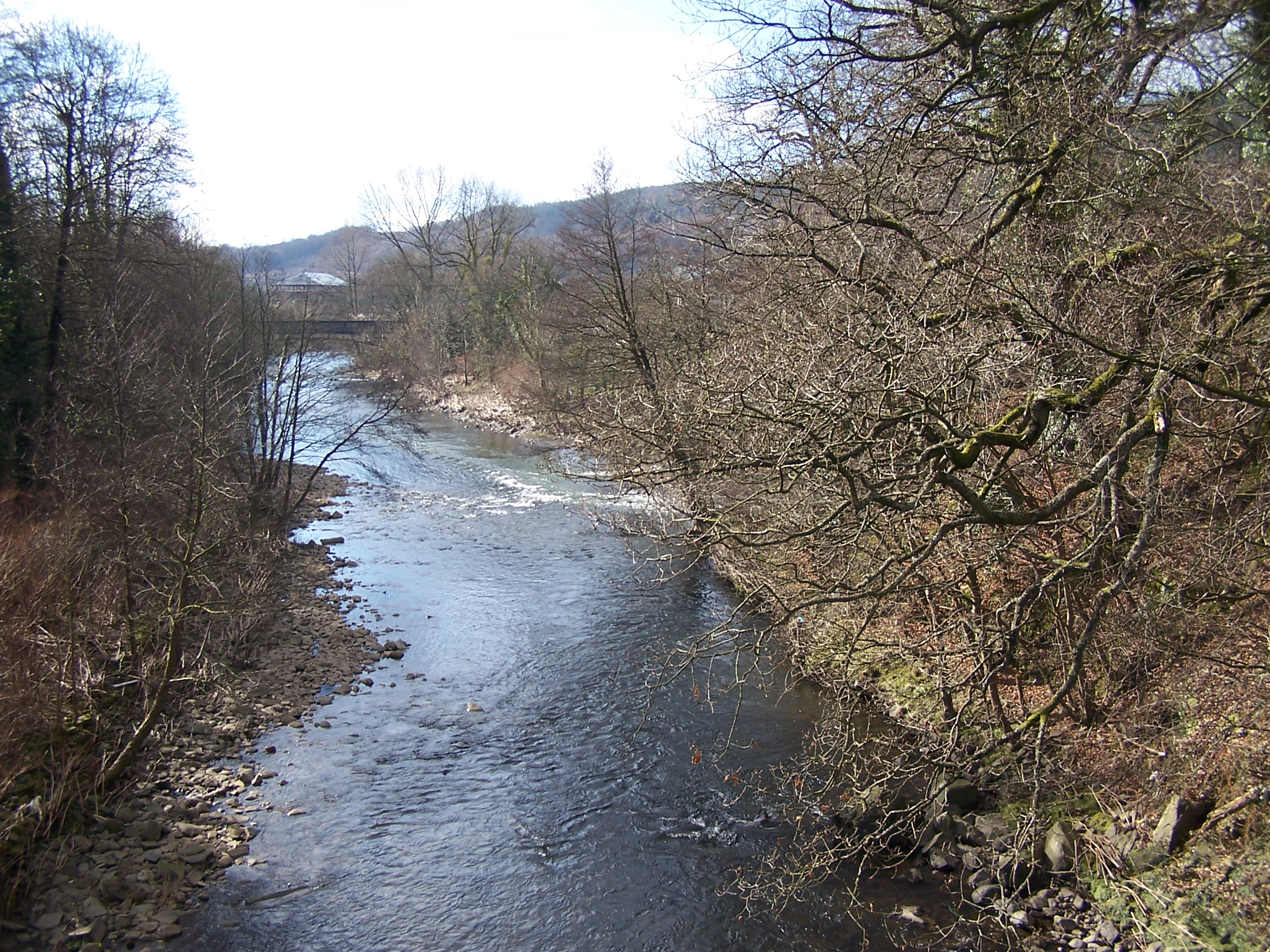
The River Cynon flows into the River Taff at Abercynon

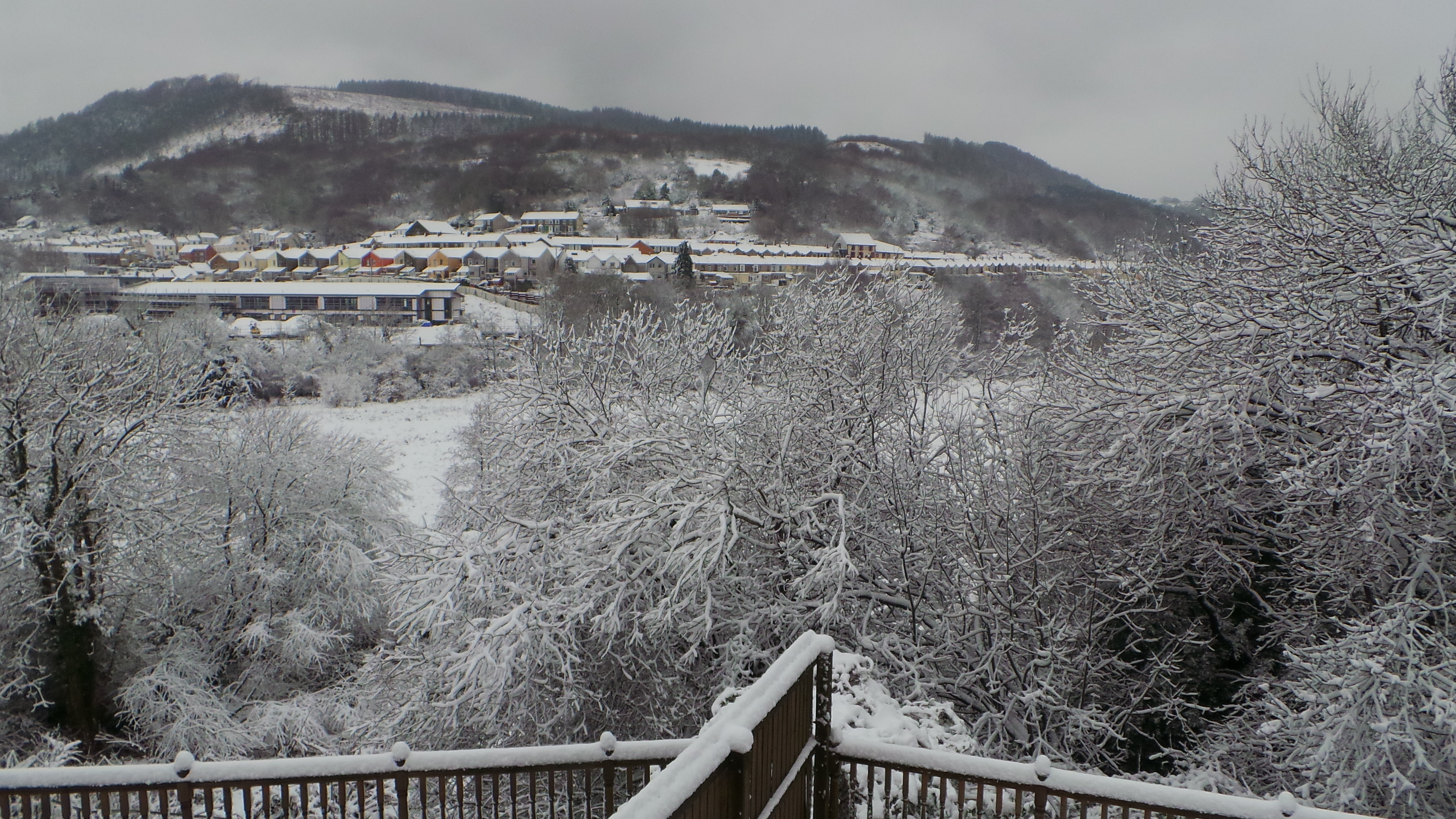
Abercynon in January 2012

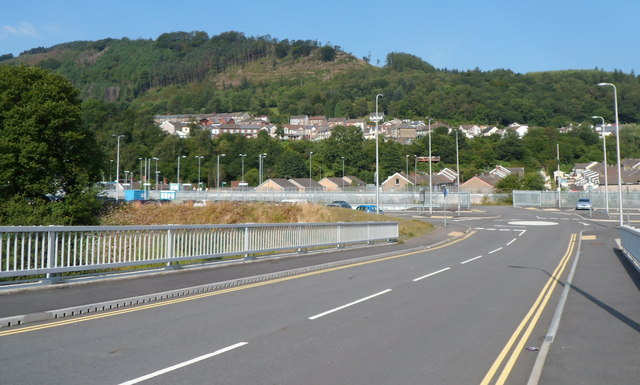
Abercynon Rail Station

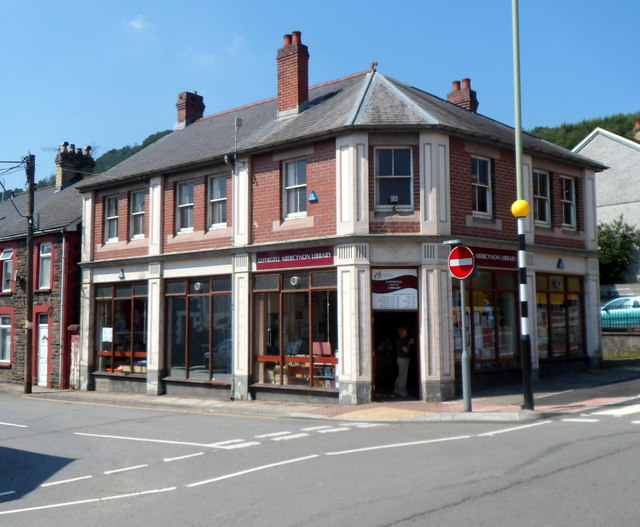
The old library, Abercynon

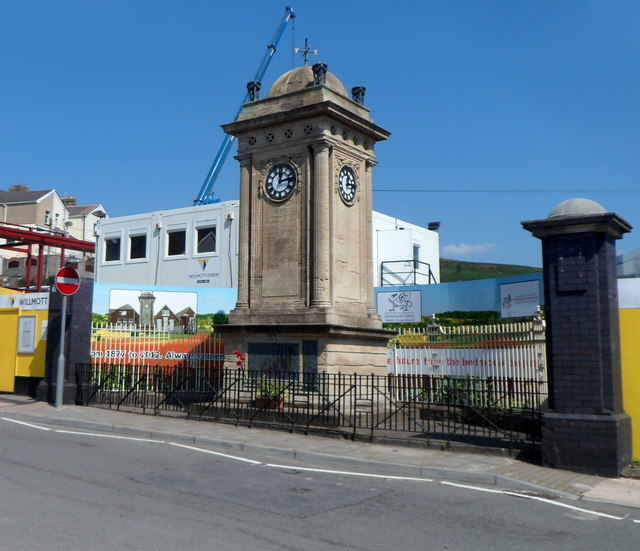
The War Memorial Clock, Abercynon

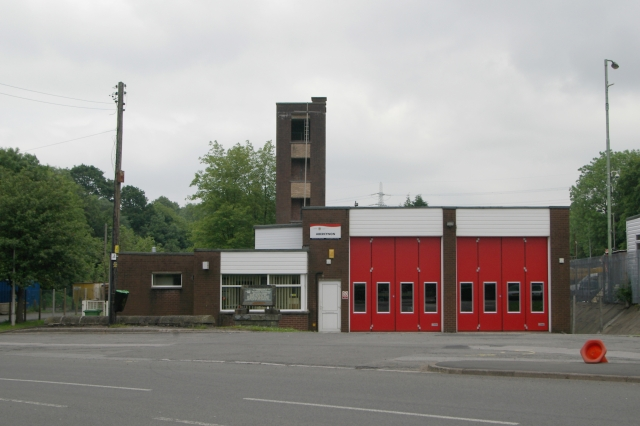
Abercynon Fire Station

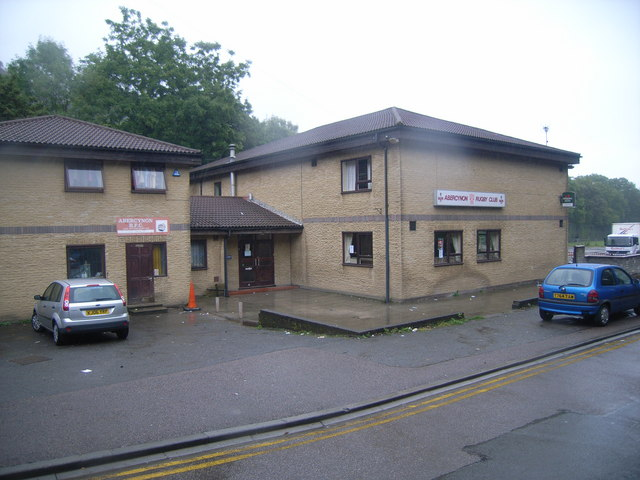
Abercynon RFC

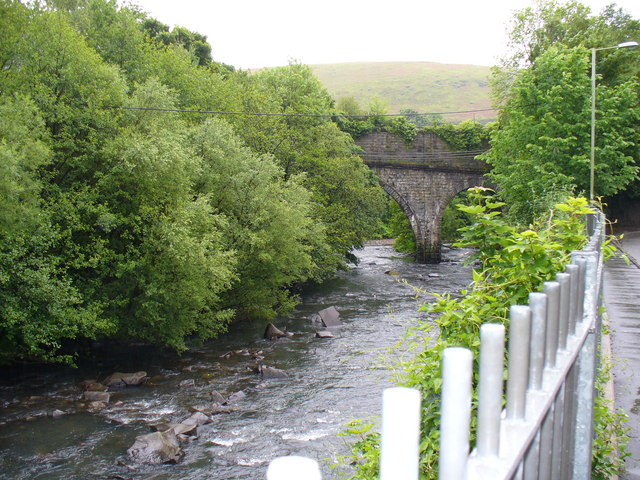
River Cynon, Abercynon

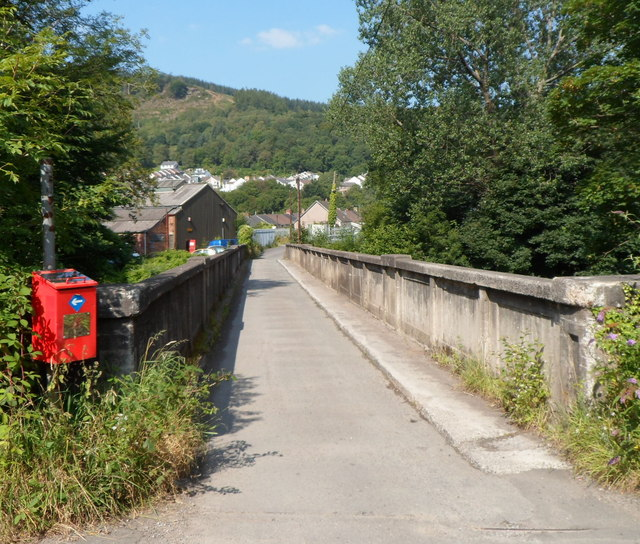
River Taff Bridge, Abercynon

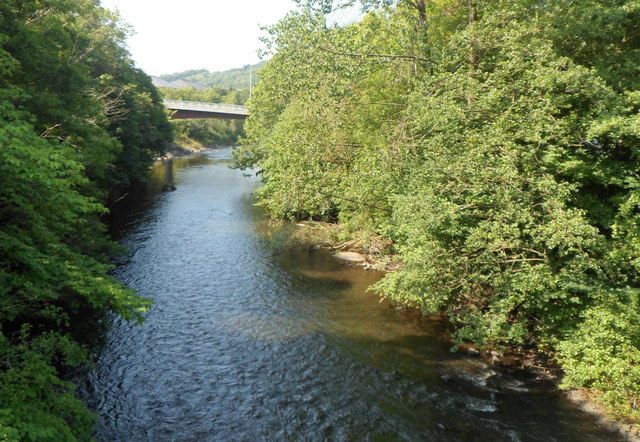
River Taff, Abercynon

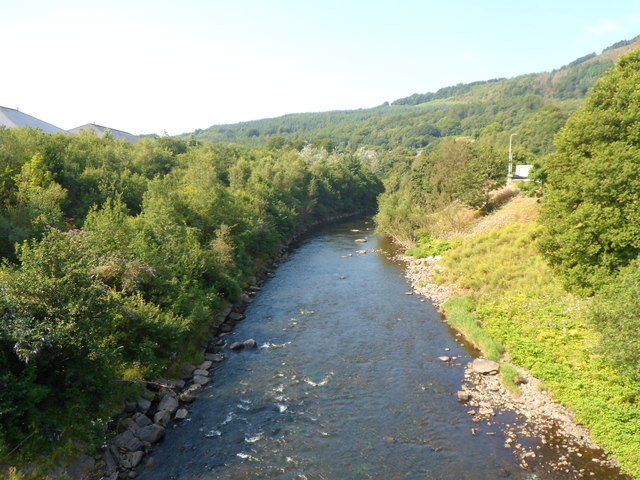
River Taff, Abercynon

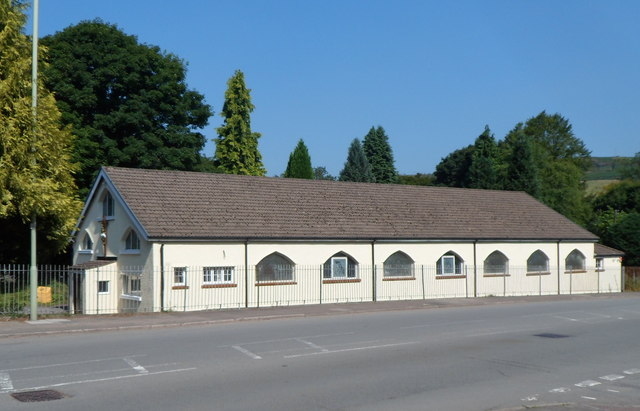
St Thomas Church, Abercynon

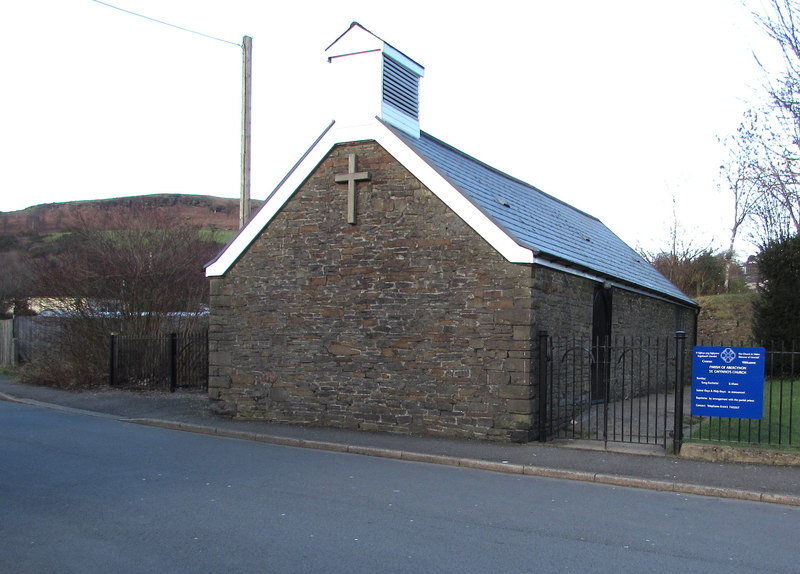
St Gwynno's Church, Abercynon

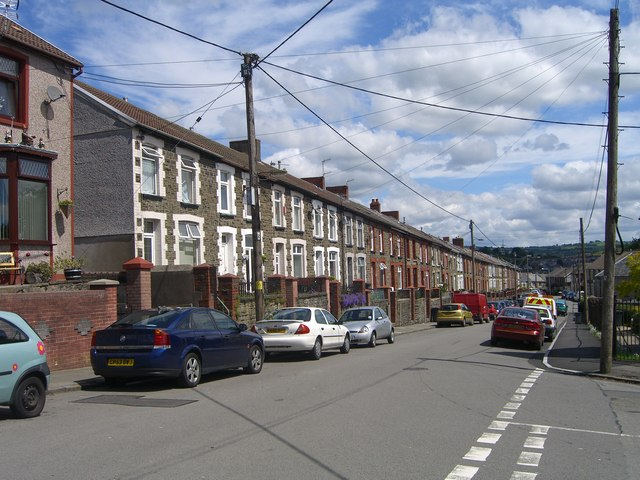
Carnetown

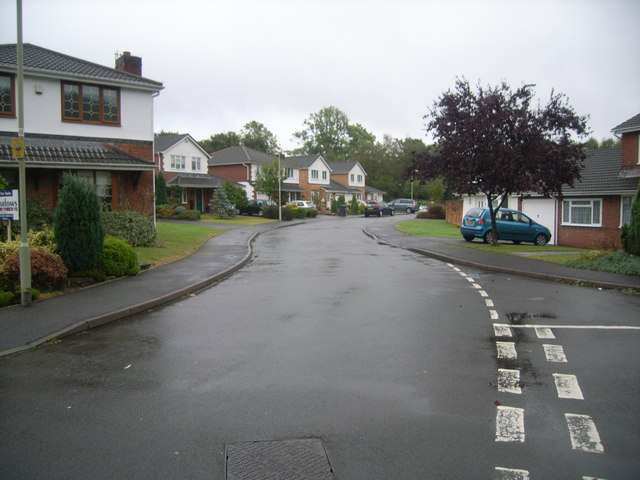
Grovers Field

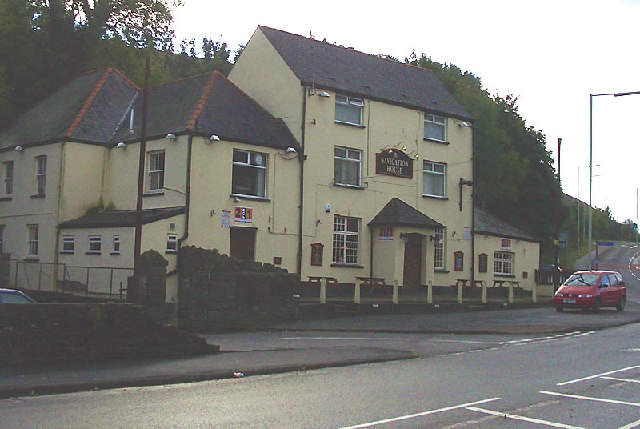
Navigation House, Navigation Park

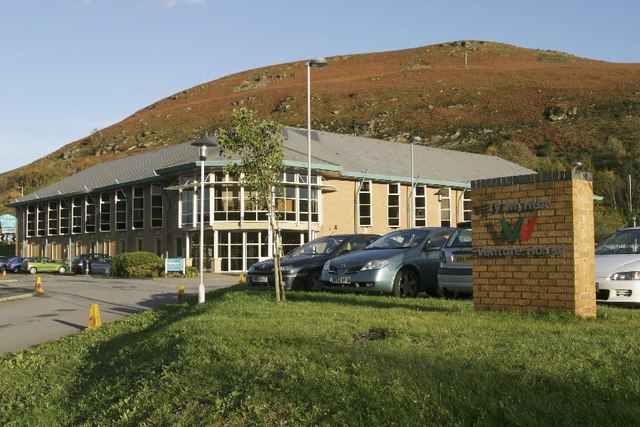
Navigation Park

== Bibliography ==
- Davies, John; Jenkins, Nigel; Menna, Baines; Lynch, Peredur I., eds. (2008). The Welsh Academy Encyclopaedia of Wales. Cardiff: University of Wales Press. ISBN 978-0-7083-1953-6.
