= Abercynon Colliery =

Welsh coal mine active 1889-1988

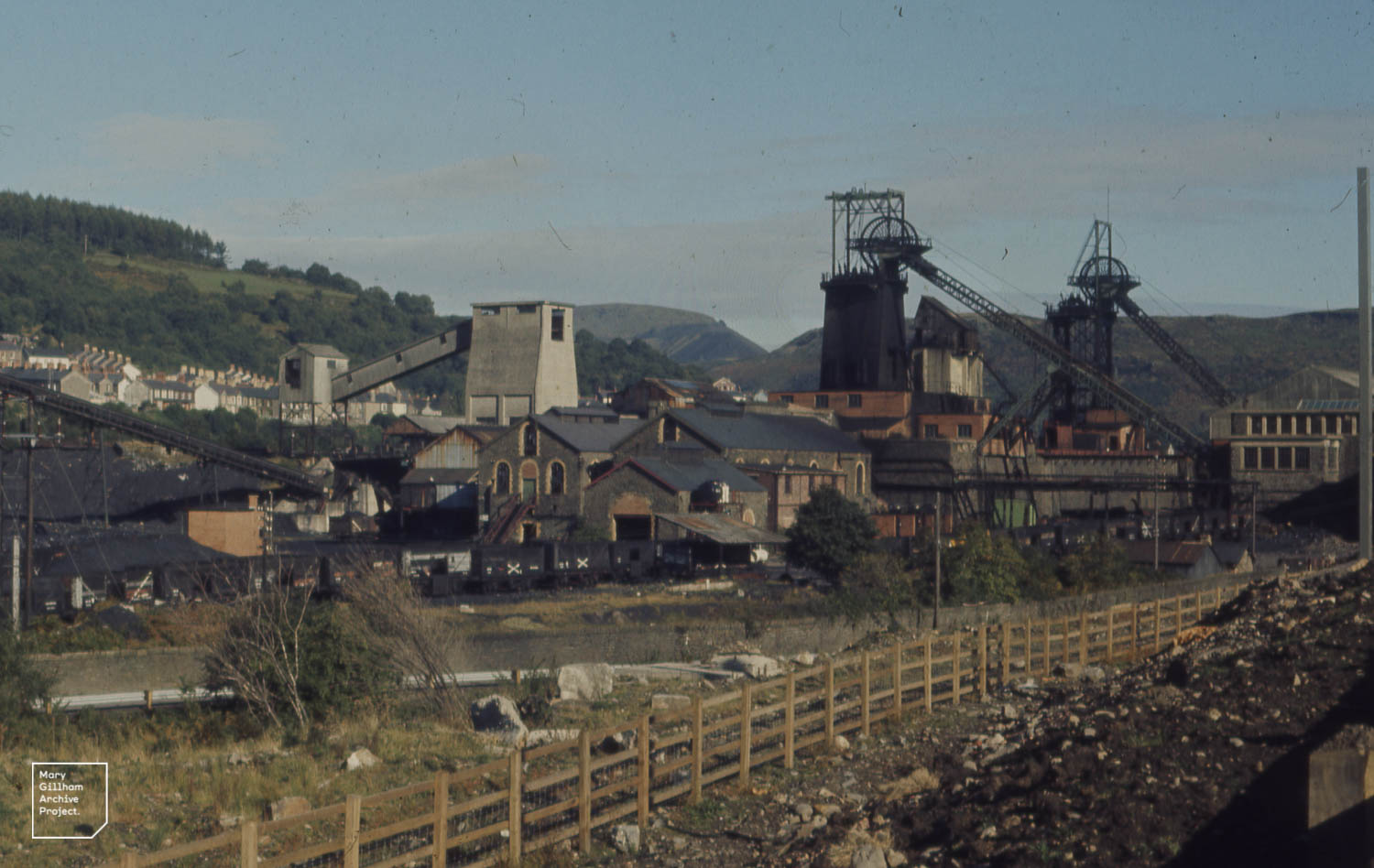
- Abercynon Colliery in 1973

- Location within Rhondda Cynon Taf Location within Wales Location within the United Kingdom

Location
- Location: Abercynon, Wales, United Kingdom; 51.6385°N 3.3284°W

Production
- Type: Coal

History
- Opened: 1889
- Closed: 1988

Abercynon Colliery was a coal mine located in Abercynon, South Wales. It was opened in 1889 and closed in 1988.

== Development ==
The colliery was developed at a cost of £270,000 from 1889, by the Dowlais Iron Company, to feed a new steel works in Cardiff. Initially known as the Dowlais Cardiff Colliery, the two shafts were sunk to the Nine Feet coal seam at depths of 740 yards (680 m) (South - upcast) and 753 yards (689 m) (North - downcast).

=== Accidents ===
Eighteen men lost their lives during development, including eight on 23 January 1893 and six on 9 September 1895. An underground haulage accident on 28 April 1906 cost the lives of five men.

== Production ==
In 1903 the pit passed into the hands of Guest Keen and Nettlefolds Ltd, at which point it employed 2,502 men. By 1923 the colliery was producing from the Six Feet, Nine Feet and Upper Four Feet seams, employing 2,794 men. In 1931 it was taken over by Welsh Associated Collieries, who were absorbed into Powell Duffryn Company Ltd. in 1936.

Nationalisation took place on 1 January 1947, but the returning miners wanted better conditions, and many choose to commute to work at the newly developed Treforest Trading Estate. Now only employing 1,100 men, the vacancies were in part filled by displaced and stateless Europeans, but even special allowances did not fulfil the labour needs of the mines.

Following development of the A470 in the late 1960s, its distinct winding head gear in blue with very long backstays supported by transitional struts, became a distinct welcoming sign for travellers towards Merthyr Tydfil.

The winding engines were some of the most powerful in the South Wales coalfield. The South had a single electric motor producing 1600 hp and the North had a twin drive system which had a rating of 3200 hp.

In March 1975, it was linked underground via two parallel tunnels with Lady Windsor Colliery, which was situated on the other side of the mountain in Ynysybwl, to form a single production unit at a cost of £450,000. Coal was raised at the Lady Windsor end of the unit from a depth of 687 yards, with 1,150 men were producing 318,000 tons yearly from Six feet, Lower Nine feet and Seven feet seams. By 1981 manpower deployment broke down to 216 on development, 292 on the coalface, 342 underground and 305 on the surface.

== Closure ==
The Lady Windsor Lodge assumed a leading role in the 1985/86 UK Miner's Strike, but on return to work the unit managed an impressive recovery obtaining 98% of expected output within a month.

The Lady Windsor/Abercynon unit was closed by British Coal in February 1988, with an estimated 25 years of workable coal left.
