= Ynysboeth =

Suburb in Rhondda Cynon Taf, Wales

Coordinates: 51.659502°N 3.3456802°W

- Suburb
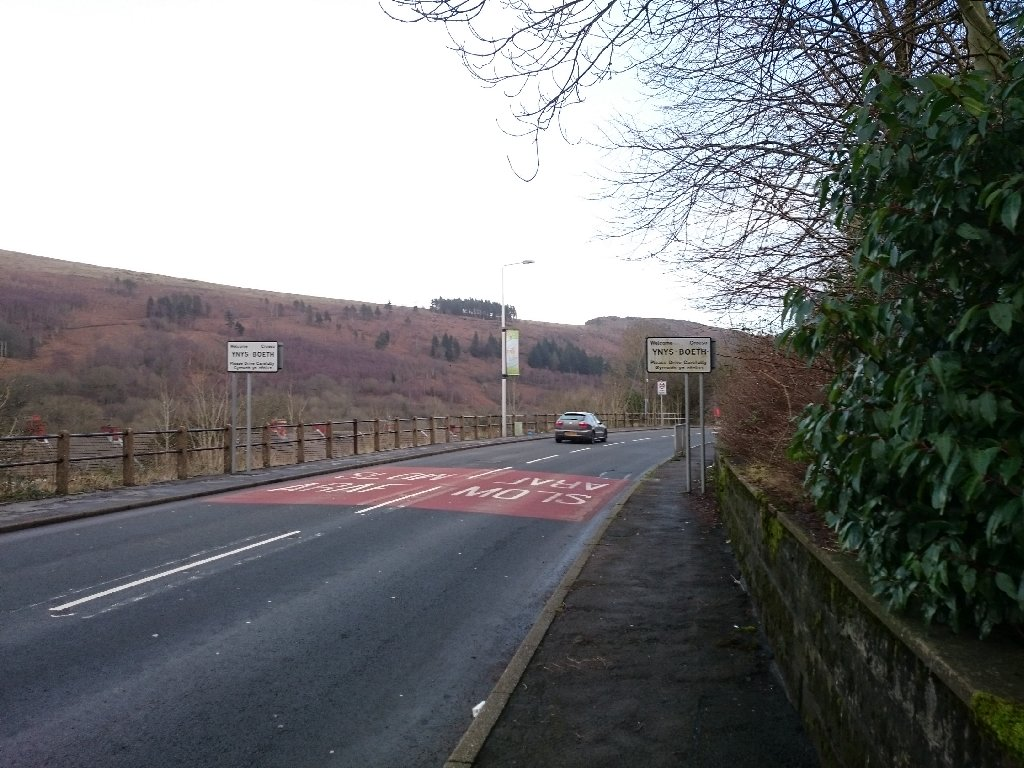
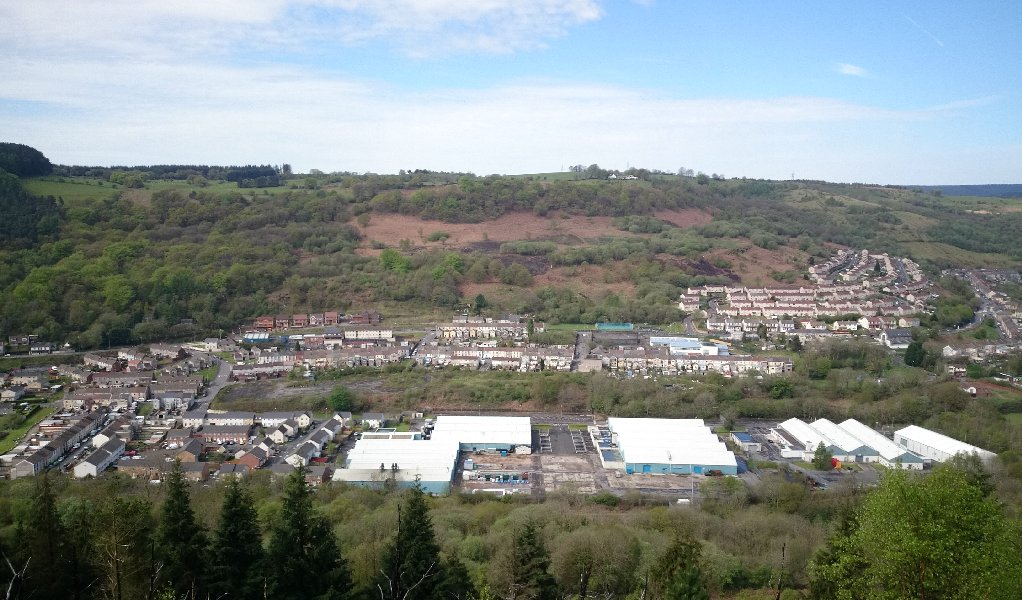
- View of Ynysboeth

- Location within Rhondda Cynon Taf
- Population: 2,036 (Census, 2011)
- OS grid reference: ST070964
  - Cardiff: 17.5 mi (28.2 km)
- Principal area: Rhondda Cynon Taf
- Preserved county: Mid Glamorgan
- Country: Wales
- Sovereign state: United Kingdom
- Post town: MOUNTAIN ASH
- Postcode district: CF45
- Dialling code: 01443
- Police: South Wales
- Fire: South Wales
- Ambulance: Welsh
- UK Parliament: Cynon Valley
- Senedd Cymru – Welsh Parliament: Cynon Valley

Ynysboeth (Welsh for 'hot island' / 'burnt river meadow') is a suburban area in the community of Abercynon, in the Cynon Valley, Rhondda Cynon Taf, South East Wales.

There is a smaller nearby associated village of Tyntetown (or 'Tynte') to the north.

Ynysboeth extends from Nant‑y‑Fedw in the south to Bryntyrion in the north, while Tyntetown comprises the houses along, and on side streets off, Pentwyn Avenue.

Ynysboeth is located on the B4275 between Penrhiwceiber (approximately 1.5 miles (2 km) to the north‑west) and Abercynon (approximately 1.5 miles (2 km) to the south‑east), and is adjoined by the small village of Pontcynon to the south.

According to the 2011 Census, the total population of the area was 2,036.

== Geography ==
Ynysboeth is bounded to the east by the River Cynon, the A4059, Coed Fforest Isaf, Cefn‑Glas, Lletty Turner, Craig‑yr‑efail, and by Edwardsville (Quakers Yard) beyond; and to the west by Coed Ty‑dan‑Darren, Tyntetown Slopes, Cwm Clydach, and Llanwonno beyond.

Its location relative to nearby principal towns is as follows: approximately 2.5 miles (4 km) south of Mountain Ash, 4 miles (6 km) west of Treharris, 7 miles (11 km) south of Aberdare, 10 miles (16 km) south of Merthyr Tydfil, 6.5 miles (10 km) north of Pontypridd, and 17.5 miles (28 km) north‑west of Cardiff.

=== Administration ===
Although Ynysboeth is not part of Abercynon itself, administratively it is grouped within the same electoral ward. However, Ynysboeth and Tyntetown are more closely aligned, from a social and historical perspective, with the nearby community of Penrhiwceiber.

These areas also fall within the ecclesiastical parish of 'Penrhiwceiber, Matthewstown & Ynysboeth', and together with Penrhiwceiber and the western portion of Mountain Ash form the 'Lower Cynon Cluster'.

=== Local Amenities ===
Ynysboeth is home to Ynysboeth Community Primary School (opened in 2013 as a merger and replacement of Ynysboeth Junior School and Ynysboeth Infants School, the latter of which was destroyed by fire in 2010) and the Bryncynon Community Revival Strategy (established in 1994). Other local facilities include a playground, a number of shops, and other businesses.

== History ==
Historically, Ynysboeth and Tyntetown fell within the parish of Llanwonno in the county of Glamorganshire (specifically Mid Glamorgan), were governed by the Mountain Ash Urban District Council, fell within the Pontypridd census registration district, and lay within the ecclesiastical parish of Penrhiwceiber.

A separate parish of Tyntetown and Ynysboeth was created in 1923, later regrouped with Penrhiwceiber to become Penrhiwceiber, Matthewstown and Ynysboeth in 1968, of which they remain a part today.

=== Ynysboeth ===
Before the end of the 19th century, the area was rural (as can be seen on Ordnance Survey (OS) maps from 1884), consisting largely of the farms Ynys‑boeth‑uchaf, Ynys‑boeth‑isaf, Aber‑nant‑y‑fedw, and Blaen‑nant‑y‑fedw, after which Ynysboeth and the area of Nant‑y‑Fedw (meaning 'stream of the birch') took their names. Historically, Nant‑y‑Fedw experienced recurring flooding issues until a major flood‑alleviation scheme was undertaken by the council in 2014–2015.

By the OS maps of 1901, much of the current village had been established, with the following roads and streets evident: Abercynon Road, Battenberg Street, Carne Terrace (later renamed Cross Street), Cross Street, Gloucester Terrace, Hartpury Street (later Maes y Ffynnon), Itton Street (later Caemaen Street), Kennard Street (later Avondale Street), and Selina Road. Also evident from this date are Ynysboeth Infants School and Ynys‑boeth Quarry.

According to the 1901 census, the population of the village at that time was 891.

The area of Nant‑y‑Fedw first appeared on OS maps from 1953 onwards, while the area of Bryntirion (meaning 'gentle hill' in Welsh) first appeared on OS maps from 1962 onwards. The streets Parry's Drive and Valley View, and the area of Maes y Ffynnon (meaning 'site of the fountain'), are all more recent additions to Ynysboeth.

Listed in the South Wales & Monmouthshire Trade Directory, 1907 were the following businesses: E. Smith (grocers), E. Smith (shopkeepers), G. Lewis (shopkeepers), John Bowen (grocers), and W. Davies (shopkeepers). The Trades Directory of Wales (North and South), 1918 lists Beatall Dairy Co (grocers) and Wm Taplin (cycle agent). The village was also previously home to the Ynysboeth Hotel.

=== Tyntetown (Matthewstown) ===
Tyntetown, meanwhile, took its name from the owner of the estate on which the village lies, Halswell Milbourne Kemeys‑Tynte, after whom several of its streets are named. Before the end of the 19th century, this area too was rural, comprising mainly the farms Pentwyn‑isaf and Pentwyn‑uchaf, after which the main road through the village (Pentwyn Avenue) took its name.

Tyntetown was previously known as Matthewstown, believed to be named after a local farmer, William Matthews. However, this name was never widely adopted, and it was only correctly renamed to Tyntetown on local road signs as late as 2011.

By the OS maps of 1901, most of present‑day Tyntetown had been established, with the following roads and streets evident: Abercynon Road (Pentwyn Avenue), Bagot Street, Haswell Street, Homerton Street, Milbourne Street, and Walsh Street. Also evident from this date is the Tynte Hotel. The only later additions are the housing along Pentwyn Avenue, the Tabernacle Chapel, and the sinking of Pentwyn Colliery, as shown on OS maps from 1921 onwards.

The 1901 census recorded the population of the village (as Matthewstown) at that time as 790.

According to the Trades Directory of Wales (North and South), 1918, the following businesses were listed as being in Tyntetown (Matthewstown): H.J. Crocker (grocers), H. Dyke (butchers), Ladd & Sons (grocers), and the Tynte Hotel (inn).

=== Industrialisation ===
Following industrialisation, the area previously had its own railway station between 1914 and 1964, named Tyntetown Halt (later referred to as Matthewstown Halt), together with sidings associated with Ynys‑boeth Quarry and Penrhiwceiber Colliery (visible on OS maps between 1901 and 1953) along the Aberdare branch of the Taff Vale Railway.

The area was also previously linked with the Edwardsville district of Quakers Yard, Treharris, via the 700‑yard‑long Cefn Glas (Quakers Yard) railway tunnel, built in 1851, which linked the Cynon Valley with Neath and Pontypool via the Newport, Abergavenny and Hereford branch of the Great Western Railway, and served the nearby Cefn Glas Colliery (sunk in 1863, employing up to 137 men and boys, and closed in 1903). This line was later opened to passenger traffic before finally being closed in 1964. Of note, a coal seam running through the tunnel was worked during the 1984–85 miners' strike.

The area was also home to Pentwyn (Merthyr) Colliery (sunk by D. R. Jones in 1920, and visible on OS maps in the vicinity of Bryntirion between 1921 and 1956), as well as Pentwyn Isha Level (employing 30 men as of 1918), Nantyfedw Level (employing 8 as of 1938), Ynysboeth Level, and numerous other trial levels, quarries, and associated tramways within the area.

Penrikyber Navigation Colliery (Penrhiwceiber Colliery) (sunk in 1872, employing up to 2,236 men and boys, and closed in 1985) was located nearby on the outskirts of Tyntetown, close to Perthcelyn and Penrhiwceiber, and many of the houses in Tyntetown and Ynysboeth were built to house the workforce of this colliery.

=== Worship ===
As well as All Saints Church (established in 1903), the area was previously home to several other places of worship, namely: Tabernacle English Baptist Chapel, Calvary Welsh Baptist Chapel, Hebron Church, Carmel English Methodist Church, Hermon Calvinistic Methodist Chapel, and Bethany Baptist Chapel.

=== Notable people ===
- Robert Pugh (actor)

== Gallery ==
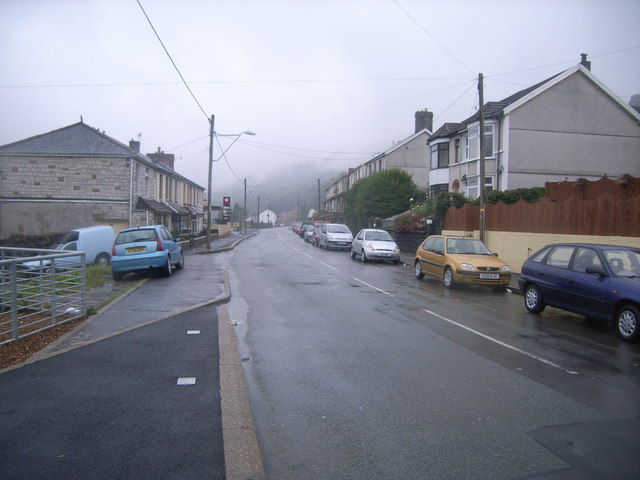
B4275 main road, Ynysboeth

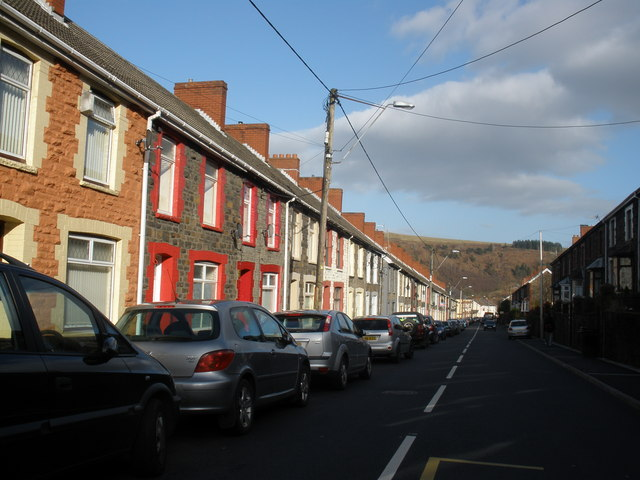
B4275 Pentwyn Avenue, Tyntetown

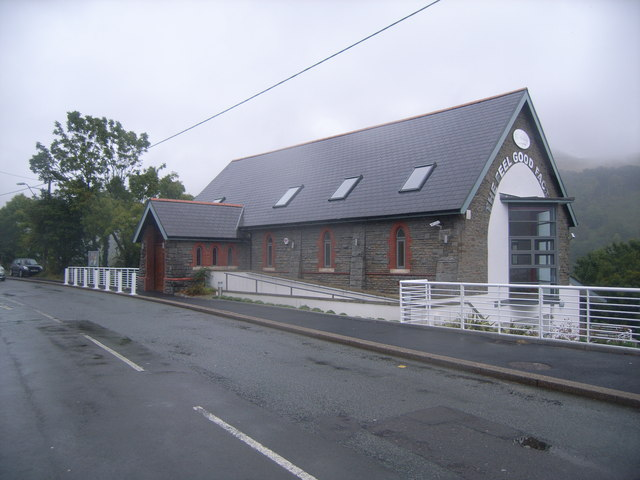
Feel Good Factory, Ynysboeth

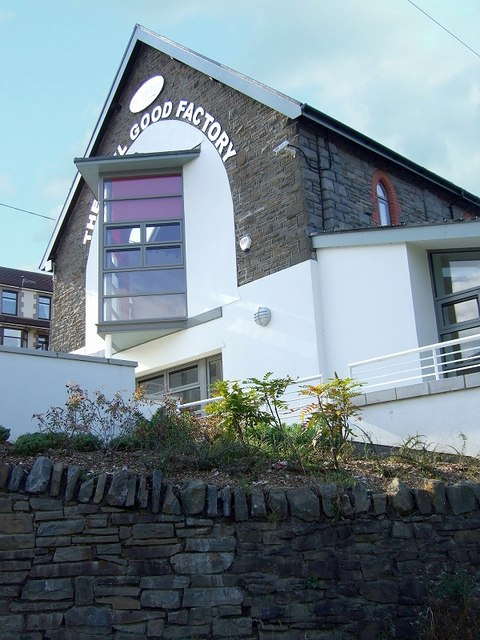
Feel Good Factory, Ynysboeth

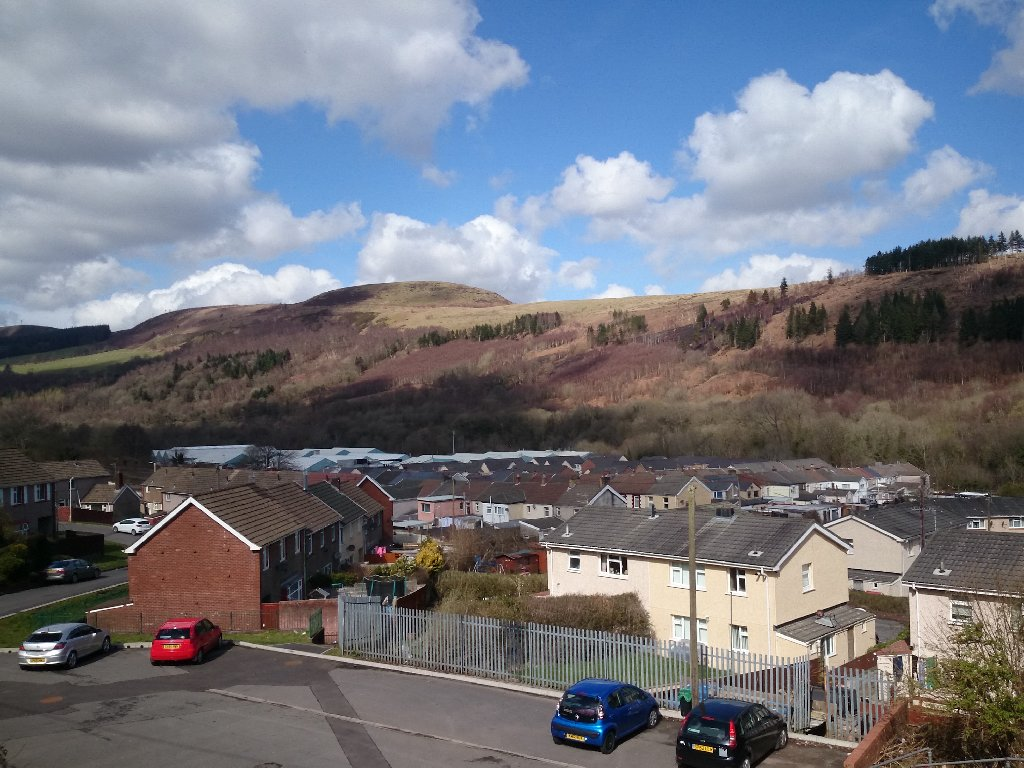
Nant‑y‑Fedw, Ynysboeth

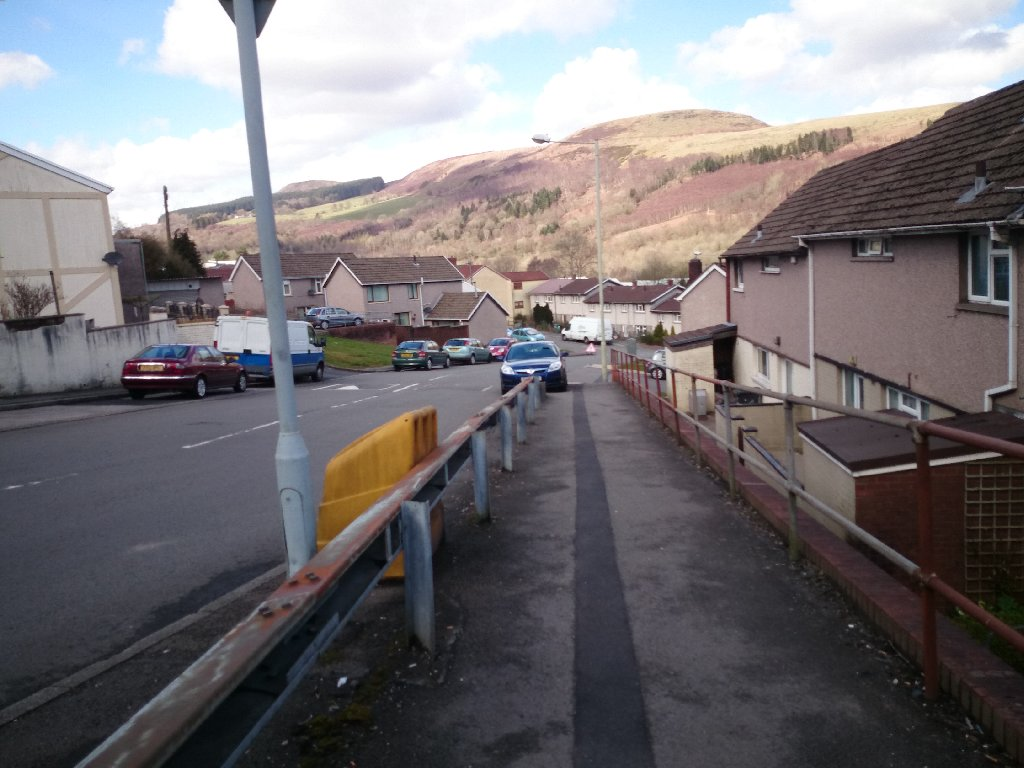
Selina Road, Ynysboeth

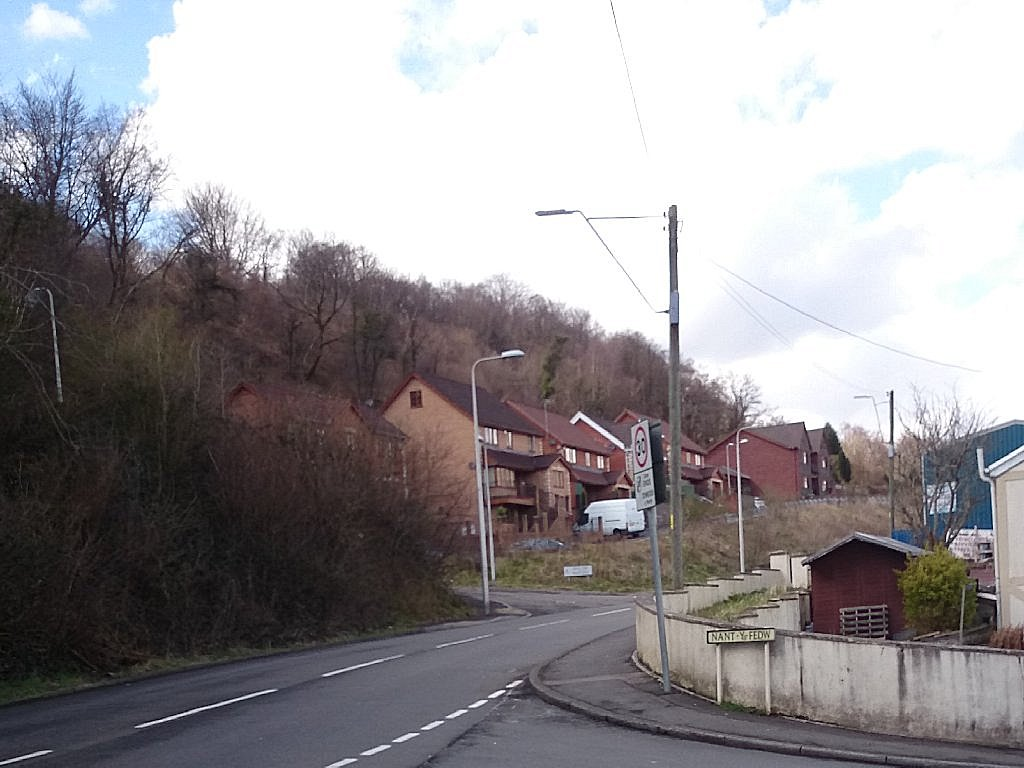
Valley View, Ynysboeth

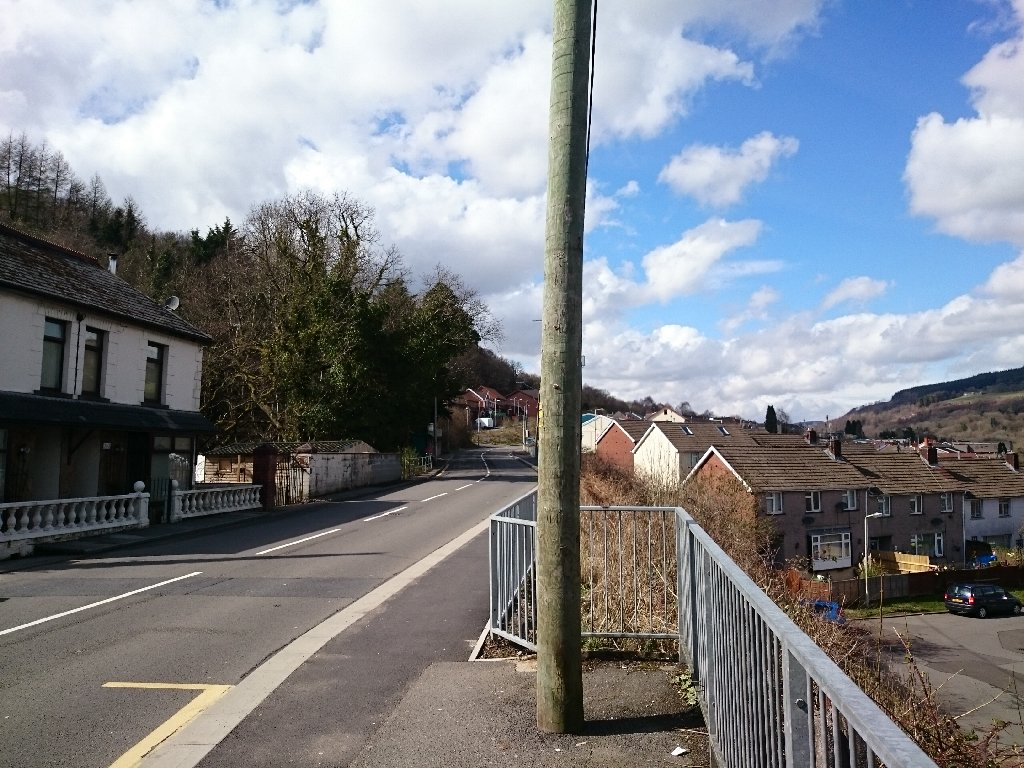
Northbound approach to Ynysboeth from Pontcynon

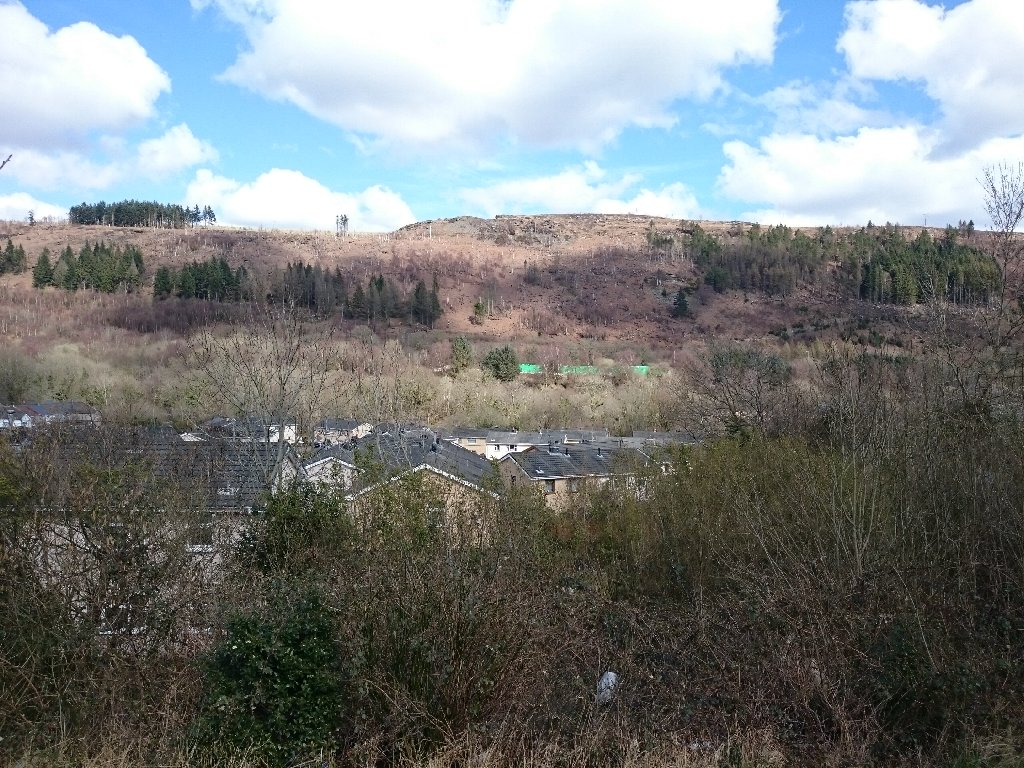
View of Cefn‑Glas hill opposite

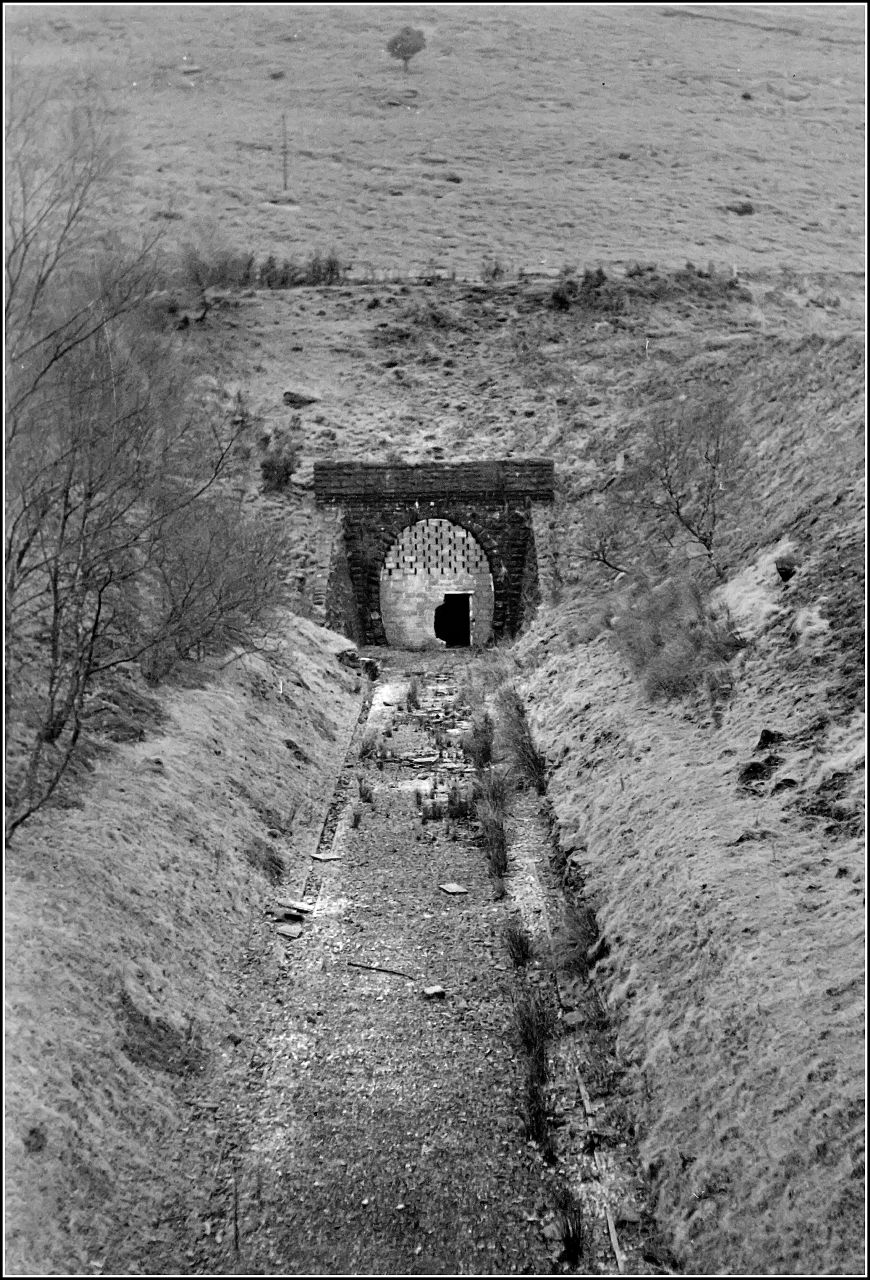
Cefn Glas (Quakers Yard) rail tunnel, Ynysboeth–Edwardsville

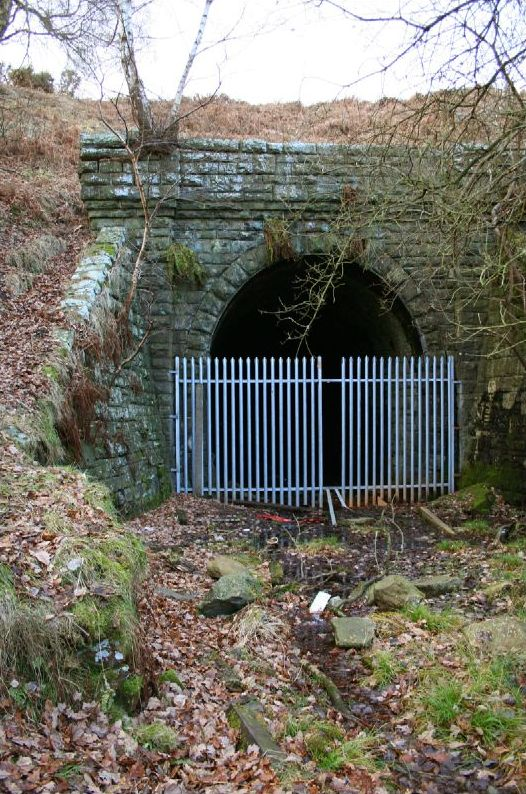
Cefn Glas (Quakers Yard) rail tunnel, Ynysboeth–Edwardsville

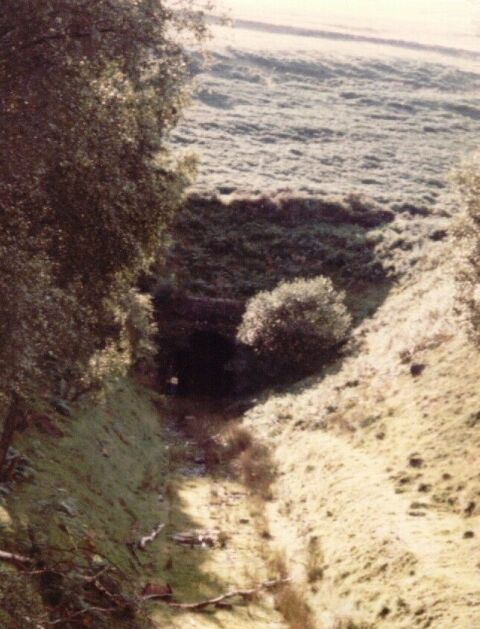
Cefn Glas (Quakers Yard) rail tunnel, Ynysboeth–Edwardsville

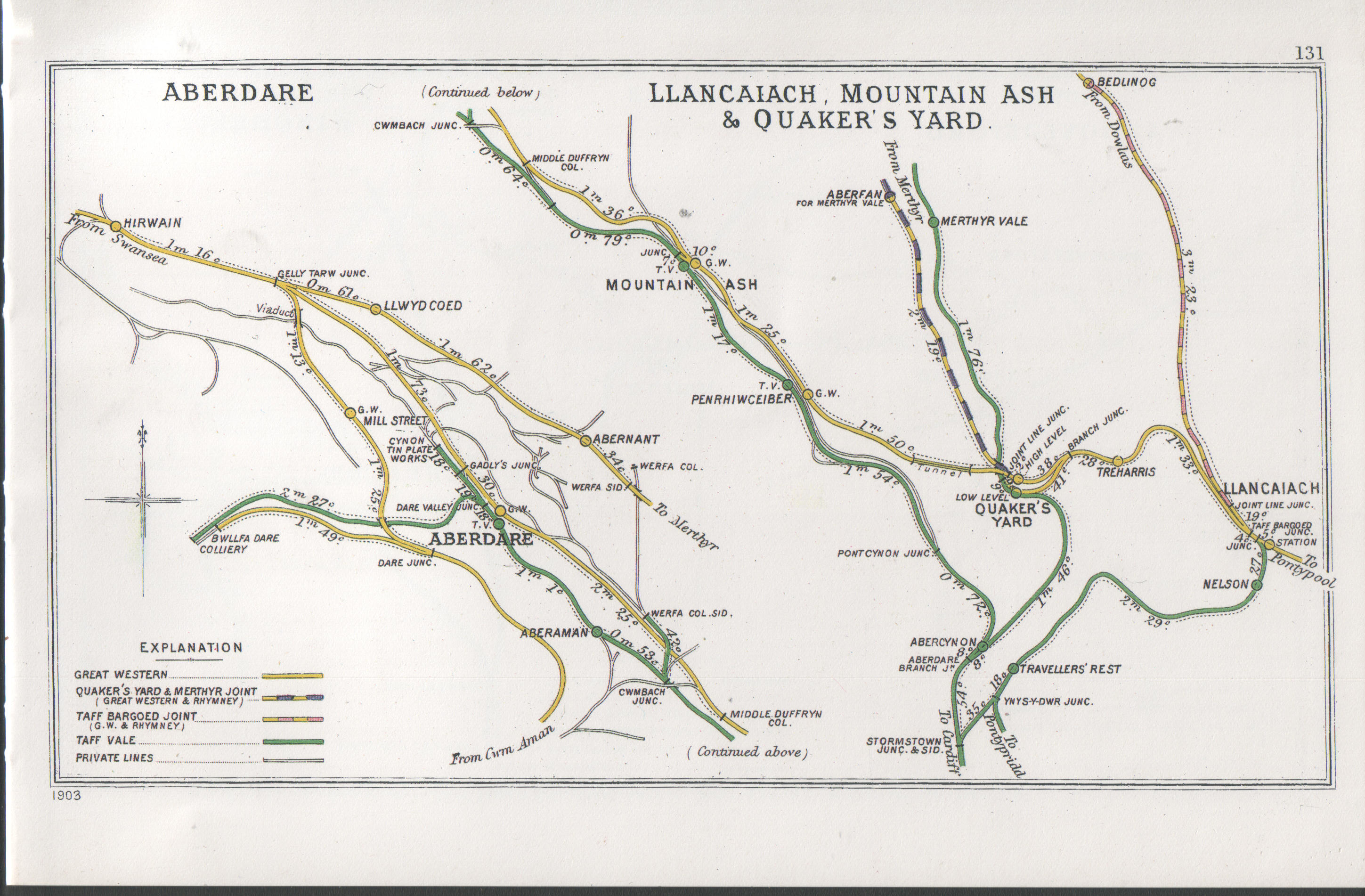
Historic alignment of the Taff Vale and Great Western railways
