= Noddfa Chapel, Ynysybwl =

Chapel in Ynysybwl, Rhondda Cynon Taf, Wales

Coordinates: 51.637577°N 3.359359°W

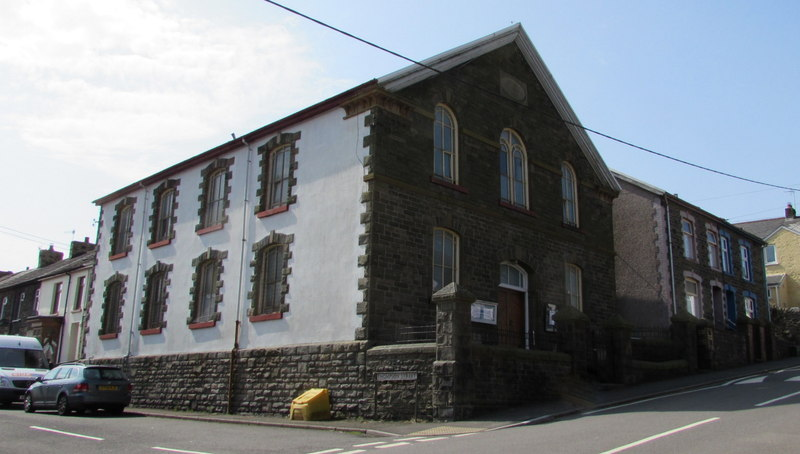
Noddfa Chapel

Noddfa is a Baptist chapel in the High Street, Ynysybwl, Rhondda Cynon Taf, Wales.

== Early history ==
The church at Noddfa dates from 1885, when meetings began to be held in a room at the Robertstown Hotel. At this time, baptisms were held in the river Clydach. The chapel was built in only nine months in 1889–90.

The first minister was Rev. W. B. Jones, but he departed for North Wales in 1895.

== Twentieth century ==
In 1976 the chapel became a united Welsh-language church, with members joining from Tabernacle and Jerusalem. Following the merger there were around 80 members. In 1986, Noddfa welcomed its last minister, Gwilym Davies, who was also inducted at Hengoed, Bryn Seion (Ystrad Mynach) and Seion, Cwmaman.

Membership had fallen to 15 by the early 21st century.

== Bibliography ==
- Jones, Alan Vernon (2004). Chapels of the Cynon Valley. Cynon Valley Historical Society. ISBN 0953107612.
