= Bethel Chapel, Ynysybwl =

Coordinates: 51.6436°N 3.3731°W

Bethel, Ynysybwl
- Bethel, Ynysybwl
- Denomination: Congregationalist

History
- Status: Closed
- Founded: 1786

Architecture
- Years built: 1876
- Closed: 1970

Bethel, Ynysybwl was a Calvinistic Methodist chapel in Rock Terrace, Ynysybwl, Glamorgan, Wales.

== Early history ==
The church at Bethel dated from the late 18th century, although the older buildings were converted into dwellings in 1876 when the new chapel was built. It is claimed that Howel Harris preached in the area before the original cause was established. John Wesley is claimed to have preached at Bethel in 1786.

During the late 19th century, Bethel, like so many nonconformist chapels, played a wider role in the life of the community than in a purely religious sphere. Public lectures were very popular, such as that delivered by the renowned poet-preacher Evan Rees (Dyfed) in 1899 on "The Land of the Negros", a popular theme at the height of British colonial activity. The lecture was apparently appreciated by a full house.

== Twentieth century ==
The chapel remained open into the late 20th century, but closed in the 1970s. The building was converted for domestic use in 1978.

== Bibliography ==
- Jones, Alan Vernon (2004). Chapels of the Cynon Valley. Cynon Valley Historical Society. ISBN 0953107612.
