= Calfaria Chapel, Abercynon =

Former chapel in Abercynon, Rhondda Cynon Taf, Wales

Coordinates: 51.6469°N 3.3249°W

Calfaria, Abercynon was a Baptist chapel in Glancynon Street, Abercynon, Mid Glamorgan, Wales. Services at Calfaria were conducted in the Welsh language.

== Early history ==
The first recorded baptisms at Abercynon were reported in 1835. Services were being held at the New inn in 1850 but the chapel was not established until 1888. The first building was known as Glancynon and built in 1888 at a cost of £285. However, within a few years it was considered too small. The new chapel was built in 1894 at a cost of £1800 and enlarged in 1904 at a cost of a further £2000. It was one of the largest chapels in the Cynon Valley. The first minister was J.F. Williams

== Twentieth century ==
In 1905, Benjamin Howells of Gelliwen, St Clears, a native of Llanelli, accepted a call to minister the church and the induction services were held in December of that year, At the time the church had a membership of 250.

After twelve years at Abercynon, Benjamin Howells moved to Letterston, Pembrokeshire, in 1918.

The last service at the chapel was held on 8 October 1981. The building was demolished in 1983 and in 1987 flats were built on the site.

== Bibliography ==
- Jones, Alan Vernon (2004). Chapels of the Cynon Valley. Cynon Valley Historical Society. ISBN 0953107612.
