= Lady Windsor Colliery =

Coal mine located in Ynysybwl, South Wales

Coordinates: 51.639°N 3.359°W

Lady Windsor Colliery was a coal mine located in the village of Ynysybwl in South Wales. Opened in 1884, it closed in 1988, 104 years later.

== Development ==
David Davies began test bores in the early 1880s at Graigddu (English - Black Rock), which proved positive. Colliery development began in 1884 by Plymouth Estates, later to become the Ocean Coal Company, with many of the early workers from Davies home village of Llandinam, Montgomeryshire. It was named after Harriet Windsor-Clive, 13th Baroness Windsor, who had been co-heiress of the Plymouth Estates. The shafts Nos.1 and 2 each 689 yards deep, with the first coal produced in 1886.

As with most coal mining areas in the South Wales Coalfield, a local community immediately sprang up around the colliery at Ynysybwl. 300 houses were built in typical South Wales Valleys terraced fashion by the mine owners in order to house workers and their families, with most built on the opposing (Western) side of the valley.

== Production ==
The high grade of coal produced was ideal for maritime uses, and was hence bought by various shipping concerns including the Admiralty and Cunard Line. This spurred Davies purchase of the rival Harris-owned Deep Navigation Colliery in 1893, which from 1914 for a period provided electricity supply to Lady Windsor.

During its peak period the colliery employed around 1500 people directly although most of the 6000-7000 village community relied upon the pit in one way or another. In 1935 the colliery was employing 142 men on the surface and 949 underground. In 1931, Lady Windsor was among the first collieries in Wales to provide a pithead baths and first aid/medical treatment room, with the residents of the village were also allowed to use the baths for a small fee (3d to 6d). In 1935 the colliery was employing 142 men on the surface and 949 underground.

Post World War II, nationalisation took place on 1 January 1947, but the returning miners wanted better conditions, and many choose to commute to work at the newly developed Treforest Trading Estate. In part filled by displaced and stateless Europeans, even special allowances did not fulfil the labour needs of the mines.

By 1956 The Lady Windsor was in need of deeper exploitation with almost all the reserves in the Upper Seams being exhausted. With closed pits from County Durham providing an influx of labour, during 1964 a £4 million reorganisation put in a new pit bottom area, trunk conveyors and a diesel loco haulage system.

In March 1975 it was linked underground via two parallel tunnels with Abercynon Colliery, which was situated on the other side of the mountain, to form a single production unit at a cost of £450,000. Coal was raised at the Lady Windsor end of the unit from a depth of 687 yards, with 1,150 men were producing 318,000 tons yearly from Six feet, Lower Nine feet and Seven feet seams.

By 1981 manpower deployment broke down to 216 on development, 292 on the coalface, 342 underground and 305 on the surface.

== Closure ==
The Lady Windsor Lodge assumed a leading role in the 1984/85 UK Miner's Strike, but on return to work the unit managed an impressive recovery obtaining 98% of expected output within a month.

The Lady Windsor/Abercynon unit was closed by British Coal in February 1988, with an estimated 25 years of workable coal left.

== Transport ==
The Taff Vale Railway financed and operated the Ynysybwl railway, a branch line of its Llancaiach Branch, which joined to the mainline to Cardiff at Stormstown Junction just south of Abercynon. Opening a year after that of the Lady Windsor Colliery, the last passenger train from Ynysybwl Halt to Pontypridd was in 1953. On closure of the mine, the tracks were lifted back to Stormstown Junction, which itself was only removed in 2006, when colour light signals replaced semaphores on the mainline.
