= Tabernacle Chapel, Abercynon =

Former chapel in Abercynon, Rhondda Cynon Taf, Wales

Coordinates: 51.6462°N 3.3303°W

Tabernacle, Abercynon was a Calvinistic Methodist chapel in Edward Street, Abercynon, Mid Glamorgan, Wales. Services at Tabernacle were conducted in the Welsh language.

== Early history ==
The church commenced in 1892, when meetings are recorded as being held in various houses and at the Junction stables. The first building, which became the vestry and Sunday school was built in 1893. Membership increased rapidly and a larger chapel was built in 1898. The new building could accommodate 550 people.

The first minister was M.H. Jones, who moved from Abercynon to Water Street Chapel, Carmarthen.

== Twentieth century ==
In 1903 the Rev. William Jones became minister and remained until he moved to Pontrhydfendigaid in 1914.

During the 1904/05 Religious Revival, membership rose to 300. Around 1912, a vestry was built at Glancynon Terrace, where a branch Sunday School and week-night services were held for the benefit of the members living on the left bank of the river Cynon. The debts arising from the building of the chapel and vestry were cleared in 1919.

The church was without a minister during the first World War, but in 1919, the Rev W.M. Davies of Treorchy, a native of Goginan, near Aberystwyth, was inducted as minister at Tabernacle.

The chapel building suffered from problems with subsidence for many years. The minister during the 1960s was D. Ben Rees who later ministered in Liverpool for over forty years. During his time at Abercynon, Rees completed a thesis on nonconformity in the Aberdare Valley which was later published in 1975 as Chapels in the Valley.

Tabernacle closed in 1991 and both chapel and vestry were demolished in 1993.

== Bibliography ==
- Jones, Alan Vernon (2004). Chapels of the Cynon Valley. Cynon Valley Historical Society. ISBN 0953107612.
