= Pontcynon =

Coordinates: 51.654490°N 3.338140°W

Pontcynon: Welsh: Pont Cynon
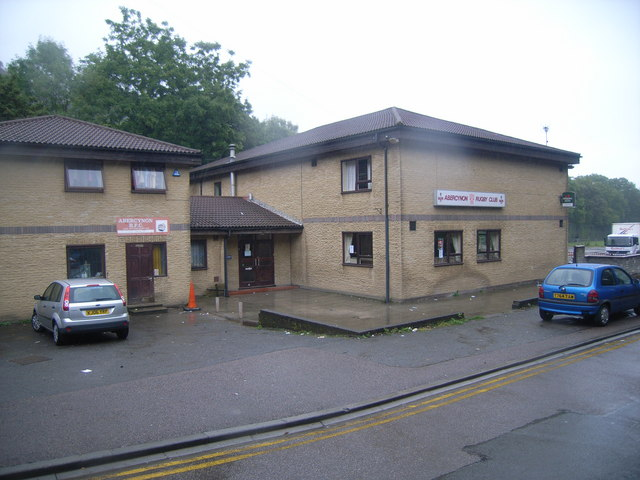

- Location within Rhondda Cynon Taf
- OS grid reference: ST0795
- Principal area: Rhondda Cynon Taf
- Preserved county: Mid Glamorgan
- Country: Wales
- Sovereign state: United Kingdom
- Post town: MOUNTAIN ASH
- Postcode district: CF45
- Dialling code: 01443
- Police: South Wales
- Fire: South Wales
- Ambulance: Welsh
- UK Parliament: Cynon Valley
- Senedd Cymru – Welsh Parliament: Cynon Valley

Pontcynon is a small village of around 200 households within the Cynon Valley in the County Borough of Rhondda Cynon Taf, Wales, near Abercynon. Most of the village consists of terraced housing fronting the B4275 Abercynon Road; but also consists of the adjoining streets of Pontcynon Terrace, Vale View and Cemetery Road.

== Geography ==
Pontcynon is located along the B4275, and is bounded by the village of Abercynon just under a mile to the south, by the A4059 to the east and by Quakers Yard beyond, and by Ynysboeth to the northwest.

Although at one time considered an outlying district of the community of Abercynon, the sign signifying the southbound approach to Abercynon is today located south of the village at a point where there is a 150m break between the terraced housing along Abercynon Road, the start and end of which indicating the boundaries of the village and of Abercynon. Pontcynon however remains part of the electoral ward of Abercynon.

The village is noted for its bridge, the 'Pont Cynon' (meaning 'Cynon Bridge' in Welsh, after which the village took its name), which crosses the railway line and the River Cynon as the B4275 at this point. This provides a link to the A4059 New Road to the east, and to the A470 and A472 beyond.

This route also provides access to nearby leisure facilities to the south, such as Abercynon Sports Centre, Abercynon RFC and Parc Abercynon; and also provides a link southbound to Greenfield Terrace towards the Abercynon district of Glancynon.

== History ==
Pontcynon as with much of the lower Cynon Valley, previously fell within the parish of Llanwonno within the historic County of Glamorganshire. The village previously had its station 'Pontcynon Halt', along the Aberdare Branch of the Taff Vale Railway, which closed during the 1960s as part of the Beeching Cuts.

== Local Amenities ==
Pontcynon is home to the Pontcynon Industrial Estate which includes the famous Garth Bakery,; as well as a local convenience store. The village also provides access to nearby Abercynon Cemetery to the south via Cemetery Road.
