= Carnetown =

District of Abercynon, Wales

Coordinates: 51.640780°N 3.333990°W

Carnetown: Carne
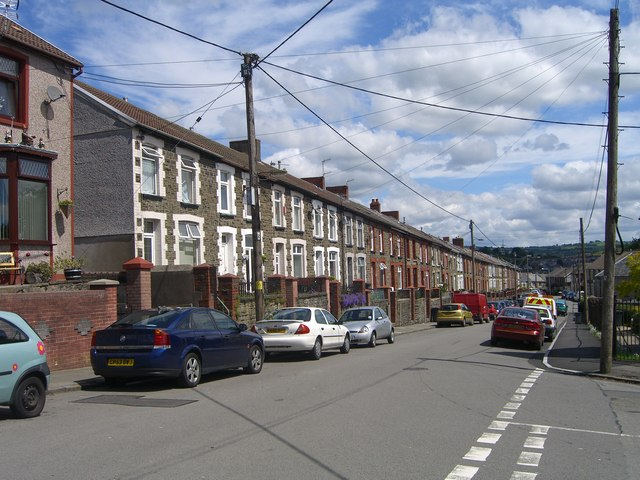
- General view of Carnetown

- Location within Rhondda Cynon Taf
- OS grid reference: ST 0778 9440
- Civil parish: Abercynon
- Principal area: Rhondda Cynon Taf
- Preserved county: Mid Glamorgan
- Country: Wales
- Sovereign state: United Kingdom
- Post town: MOUNTAIN ASH
- Postcode district: CF45
- Dialling code: 01443
- Police: South Wales
- Fire: South Wales
- Ambulance: Welsh
- UK Parliament: Cynon Valley
- Senedd Cymru – Welsh Parliament: Cynon Valley

Carnetown (or 'The Carne') is a district of Abercynon, within the Cynon Valley in the County Borough of Rhondda Cynon Taf, Wales.

Carnetown is located to the south and west of Abercynon, and comprises Carnetown itself to the west, and the large modern housing estate of 'Grovers Field' to the south.

The area is home to 'Carnetown Primary School', 'St. Donat's Church' (built in 1898), 'Carne Park Hotel' and various shops/businesses, and previously had its own post office until 2005.

== Gallery ==
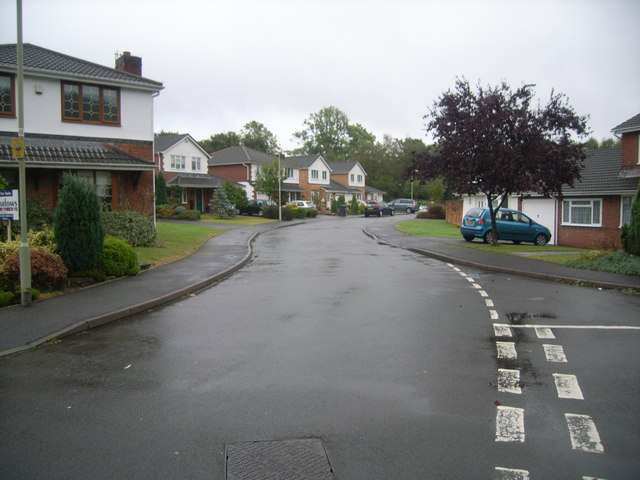
Grovers Field
