= Tabernacle Chapel, Ynysybwl =

Former chapel in Ynysybwl, Rhondda Cynon Taf, Wales

Coordinates: 51.641041°N 3.360082°W

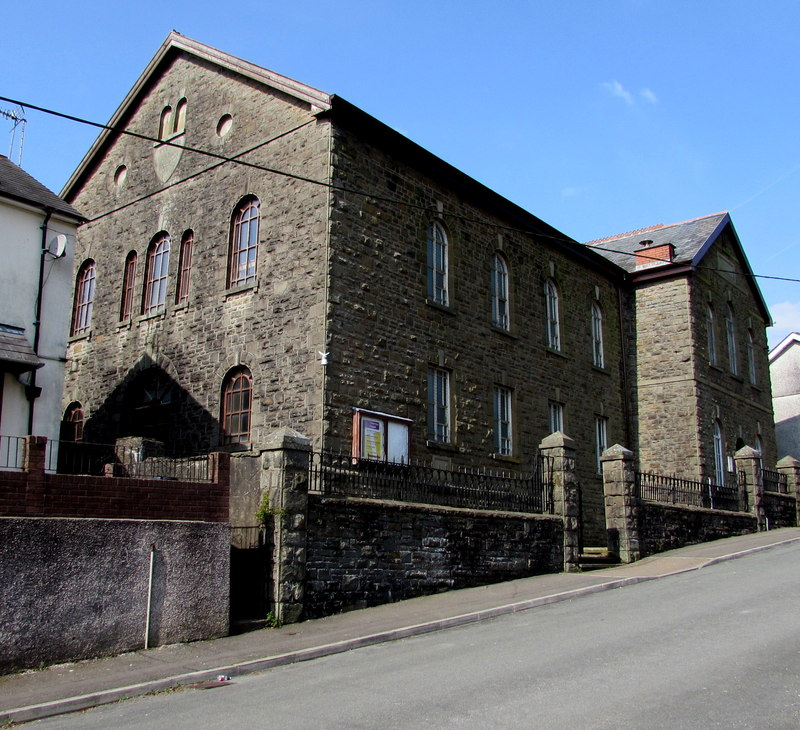
Tabernacle Chapel in 2015

Tabernacle, Ynysybwl is a former Independent chapel in Other Street, Ynysybwl, Rhondda Cynon Taf, Wales.

== Early history ==
Like several other chapels in the village, Tabernacle dates from 1885, when a group of young local people were asked why they did nor attend Bethel Chapel. They responded by saying that they were not Methodists but Welsh Independents and would attend an Independent chapel if one was established. Consequently, services began to be held in the upper room of the Windsor Hotel.

The opening services were held on 11 and 12 September 1887.

== Twentieth century ==
By the early 21st century membership stood at around 20. The Chapel closed in 2021 and the building was put up for sale for £70,000.

== Bibliography ==
- Jones, Alan Vernon (2004). Chapels of the Cynon Valley. Cynon Valley Historical Society. ISBN 0953107612.
