= Jerusalem Chapel, Ynysybwl =

Former chapel in Ynysybwl, Rhondda Cynon Taf, Wales

Coordinates: 51.6357°N 3.3582°W

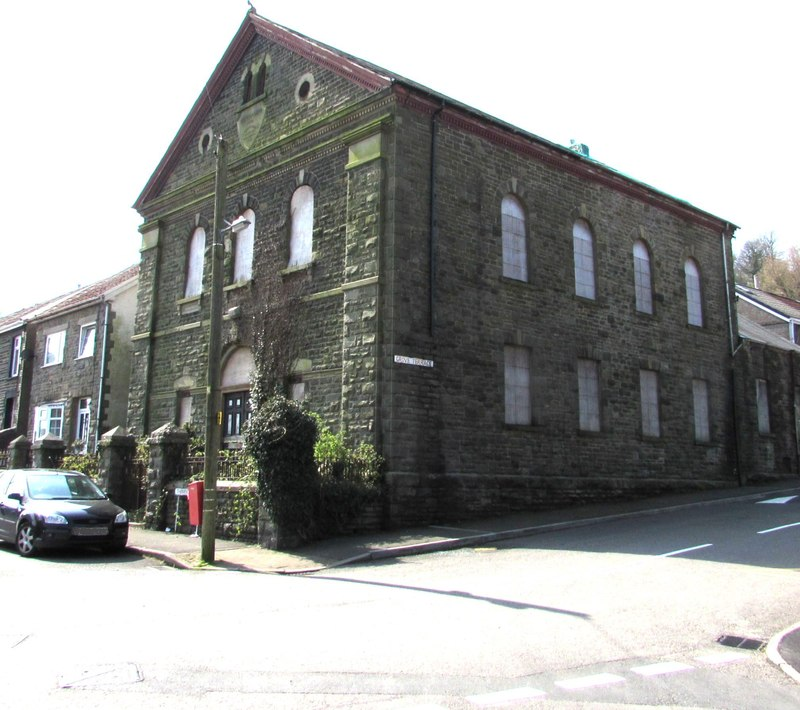
Jerusalem, Ynysybwl

Jerusalem, Ynysybwl was a Calvinistic Methodist chapel in Thompson Street, Ynysybwl, Glamorgan, Wales. Services at Jerusalem were conducted in the Welsh language.

== Early history ==
The church at Jerusalem dates to 1885, when meetings began to be held by a number of miners at a house in the village. In 1888, a chapel was built by William and Edward Williams of Cribinddu Farm, who became deacons at the chapel and generous financial benefactors. Rev D. Jones was the first minister.

From its earliest days, Jerusalem, like other chapels, hosted cultural events beyond the religious sphere. In 1889, the eisteddfod at Jerusalem saw the young poet J.J. Williams come to prominence.

== Twentieth century ==
Isaac Morris was minister from 1913 until 1925, followed by T.M. Lloyd from 1925 until 1931. Membership remained at 270 in 1938. Randall Jones, a former miner, was minister from 1938 until 1946. He was followed by H. Glyn Davies from 1946 until 1955 and J.L. Mathias from 1955 until around 1970. The chapel closed in 1976 with the members joining the Baptist congregation at Noddfa.

== Bibliography ==
- Jones, Alan Vernon (2004). Chapels of the Cynon Valley. Cynon Valley Historical Society. ISBN 0953107612.
