= Ynysybwl =

Coordinates: 51.640°N 3.3675°W

Ynysybwl: Welsh: Ynys-y-bŵl
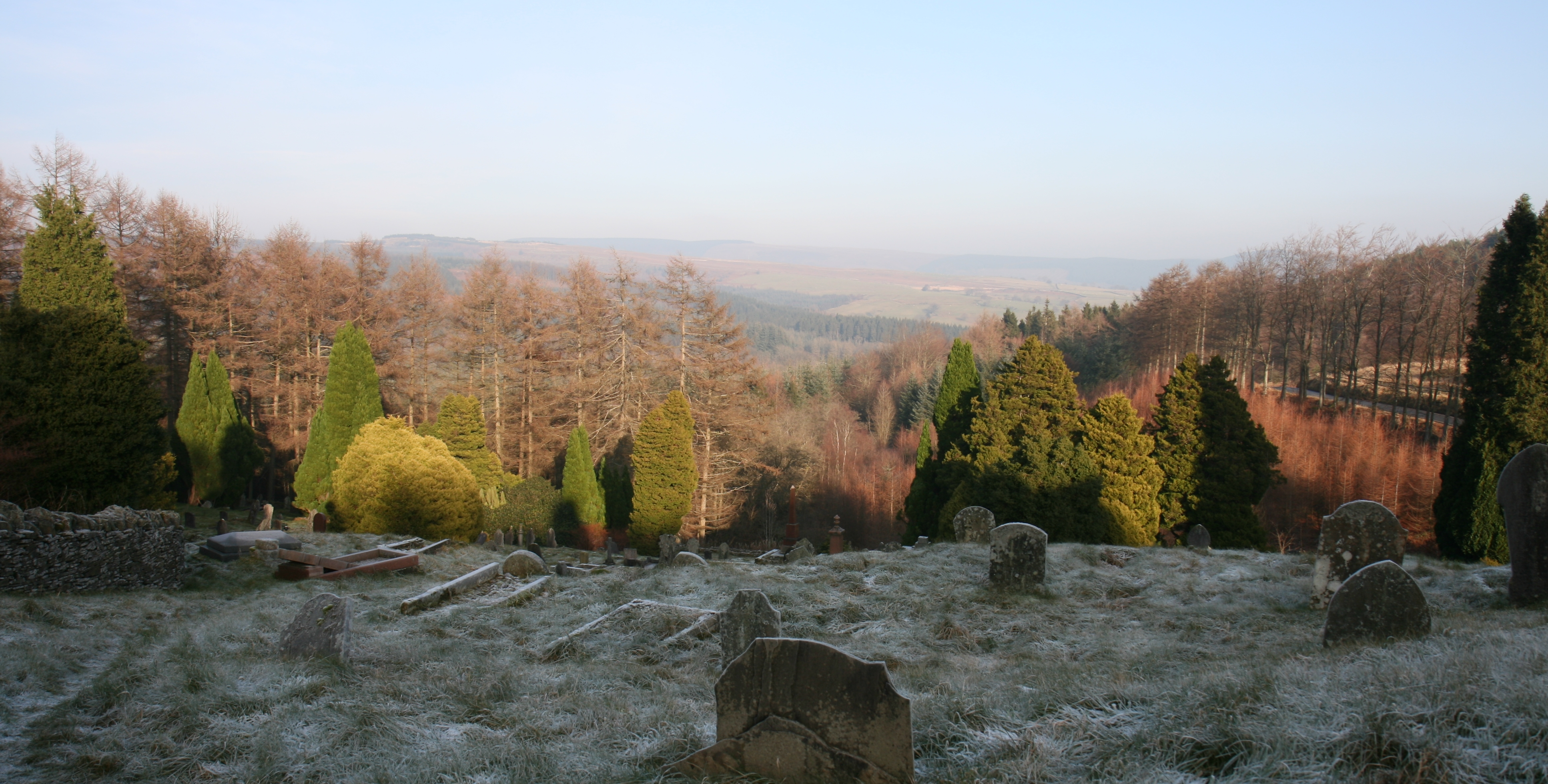
- Llanwynno Forest in winter, as seen from St Gwynno's Church

- Location within Rhondda Cynon Taf
- Population: 4,664 (2011)
- OS grid reference: ST054949
- Community: Ynysybwl and Coed-y-Cwm
- Principal area: Rhondda Cynon Taf
- Preserved county: Mid Glamorgan
- Country: Wales
- Sovereign state: United Kingdom
- Post town: Pontypridd
- Postcode district: CF37
- Dialling code: 01443
- Police: South Wales
- Fire: South Wales
- Ambulance: Welsh
- UK Parliament: Pontypridd
- Senedd Cymru – Welsh Parliament: Cynon Valley

Ynysybwl (Welsh: Ynys-y-bŵl [ənɪsəˈbʊl]) is a village in Wales. It is situated in the county borough of Rhondda Cynon Taf, roughly 15 miles (24 km) north-north-west of Cardiff, 4 miles (6 km) north of Pontypridd and 16 miles (26 km) south of Merthyr Tydfil, and forms part of the community of Ynysybwl and Coed-y-Cwm.

The market town of Pontypridd lies to the south at the meeting point of the three valleys; and to the north lies the large Llanwynno forestry. Before the local government reforms of 1996 Ynysybwl was in the Cynon Valley district of Mid Glamorgan, and the area is historically a part of Glamorgan (Morgannwg).

== Etymology ==
Ynys is a placename element often translated as "island" or "river meadow", in the south Wales Valleys the word commonly refers to meadows on the banks of rivers, and Ynysybwl likely refers to one such meadow on the Clydach. However the meaning of the second element is much less certain.

The modern spelling of Ynysybwl suggests that the second element may be "bŵl" (meaning a bowl or bowl-shaped) in reference to the shape of the river-meadow or the valley itself. In the nineteenth century, Ynysybwl was noted as a place for fairs and sports, especially ballgames such as Welsh handball. Thomas Morgan stated that he believed that Ynysybwl was a corruption of "Ynys-y-bêl" (the meadow of the ball) in reference to its long history as a meeting place for ballgames. A third derivation is that this element is "pwll" the Welsh word for a pit. This is also noted by Morgan, who also suggests that the element may be "pwl", which means unprofitable.

== Early history ==
Ynysybwl is located in the centre of the Llanwynno parish, at the point where the stream known as Y Ffrwd flows into the Nant Clydach. Then a collection of small local farms and meadows in a quiet and completely rural valley, at the 1841 census around 200 people lived in the village and surrounding farms.

== Religion ==
Churches/Chapels in/serving Ynysybwl
Church/Chapel	Denomination	Language	Founded	Built	Location	Disbanded	Notes
Saint Gwynno Church	Church in Wales, Diocese of Llandaff, Parish of Pontypridd				Llanwynno Forestry		
Bethel	Calvinistic Methodist	Welsh		1876	Rock Terrace	~1970s	
Christ Church	Church in Wales, Diocese of Llandaff, Parish of Pontypridd				36 Church Street,		
Jerusalem	Calvinistic Methodist	Welsh	1885	1888	Thompson Street	1976	
Noddfa	Originally Baptist, now United Welsh Language Church	Welsh	1885	1890	High Street		
Tabernacle	Independent	Welsh	1885	1887	Other Street	2021	
Zion	Baptist	English	1890	1905	Robert Street		
Ebeneezer	Wesleyan	Welsh		1892	Robert Street		
Crossroads	Originally Wesleyan, then Pentecostal	English	1890		Thompson Street	~1970s	
Glyn Street	Presbyterian	English		1896	2 Glyn Street		
New Road Congregational	Independent	English	1896	1906	New Road		
Gospel Hall		English					

== Governance ==
Ynysybwl was the name of an electoral ward, created in 1898 for elections to Mountain Ash Urban District Council.

Since 1995 Ynysybwl has been an electoral ward to Rhondda Cynon Taf County Borough Council, electing one county borough councillor. Following a local government boundary review, the number of councillors was increased to two, effective from the 2022 Rhondda Cynon Taf County Borough Council election.

At the lowest tier of local government, Ynysybwl is represented by Ynysybwl & Coed-y-Cwm Community Council.

== Coal Industry ==
The rich seams of coal in the Mynachdy level that lie beneath the surface had thus far only been tapped to the amount required to supply these local farms. David Davies began test bores in the early 1880s at Graigddu ("Black Rock"), which proved positive, and the resultant sinking of Lady Windsor Colliery by the Ocean Coal Company on 16 June 1884 gave birth to new coal town.

=== Lady Windsor Colliery ===
Lady Windsor Colliery opened in 1886, with 300 new miners' houses built on the opposite (western) side of the valley in typical terraced fashion by the mining company to house its workers and their families.

At its peak, the colliery employed around 1,500 people directly, although most of the 6,000-7,000 village community relied upon the pit in one way or another. The pit thrived throughout the first half of the 20th century, one of a number of very successful mines in South Wales.

However coal mining fell out of favour with many people, including politicians, and the Lady Windsor Colliery did not escape the troubles that plagued the industry during the miners' strikes of the early 1980s. The pit was finally closed in 1988.

== Present day ==
Ynysybwl Census
Population: Total (29 April 2001); 0-17; 18-60; 61+	4,787; 25.8% 40.6% 33.6%
Welsh language: Any skills	23.4%

Despite the pit closure, the village has survived, people finding work in the newly developing industries in nearby Pontypridd, Treforest, Aberdare, Caerphilly, Merthyr Tydfil and Cardiff.

This, coupled with the replacement of the pit as the village focus by local churches, Nonconformist chapels, clubs and associations, has led to a renewed interest in regeneration of the village. This led to the formation of the Ynysybwl Regeneration Partnership, an umbrella group formed to help achieve funding and organisation for activities within the village.

Today, Ynysybwl has many clubs and associations for such a small village, boasting karate, rugby, football, bowls, and a pony club. The village no longer has a male voice choir.

The nearby Llanwynno forestry also has the successful Daerwynno Outdoor Activity Centre, an outdoor pursuits centre run by people from the village, and a newly developing cycle path that will form part of the local Taff Trail.

== Places and events ==
As with many Industrial Revolution-born villages, Ynysybwl is a community based around a number of key places.

The local Trerobart and Glanffrwd schools cater for over 450 pupils. The Recreation Ground is the home to many of the village's sporting clubs, hosting rugby, football, and bowls as well as incorporating a large playing area.

The largest regular event around Ynysybwl is the regular passage of the Network Q Rally of Great Britain through the Llanwynno forestry.

A further traditional event is the running of the Nos Galan Races, in tribute to the legend of Guto Nyth Brân.

Overlooking the village from the mountainside is a prominent rock formation known locally as Rock Ar Valla (English: Rock On The Wall.) The origin of this name is unknown however, due to language and mispronunciation, is also known as Rock Of Allah and Rock Ar Allan (English: Outward Rock.)

== Transport ==
The Ynysybwl branch line railway was opened in 1885 to serve mineral workings in the valley. A passenger service was started in 1890, at first to Abercynon but later more conveniently to Pontypridd.

Lady Windsor Colliery was a dominant source of business for the line. After World War II passenger carrying declined greatly, and the passenger service was withdrawn in 1953. The line closed completely in 1988 when Lady Windsor Colliery closed.

== Notable people ==
See also Category:People from Ynysybwl

- Alun Wyn Davies - rugby, Welsh team coach
- Don Dearson - Footballer, Welsh international
- Garin Jenkins - Wales' most-capped hooker
- Staff Jones - rugby, capped for Wales in 1983 and toured with the British Lions to New Zealand in 1985
- Ken Leek - footballer, Welsh International, played for Northampton, Leicester, Newcastle, Birmingham, Northampton, Bradford City, Rhyl, Merthyr, Ton Pentre.
- Neville MacDonald - singer with UK rock band Skin (British band)
- Dale McIntosh - rugby, Pontypridd RFC captain
- Leighton Rees - darts player, first ever World Champion in 1978
- Tommy Scourfield - rugby union player capped for Wales in 1930
- Gareth Dean - Rugby League player, Welsh International, played for Wigan Warriors, London Broncos, Celtic Crusaders, Cardiff Demons, Workington, Carcassonne.
- Adam Thomas - Rugby Union player, Wales 7's International, played for Cardiff Blues, Pontypridd, Ynysybwl.
