= Abercanaid =

Village in South Wales

Coordinates: 51°43′N 3°22′W

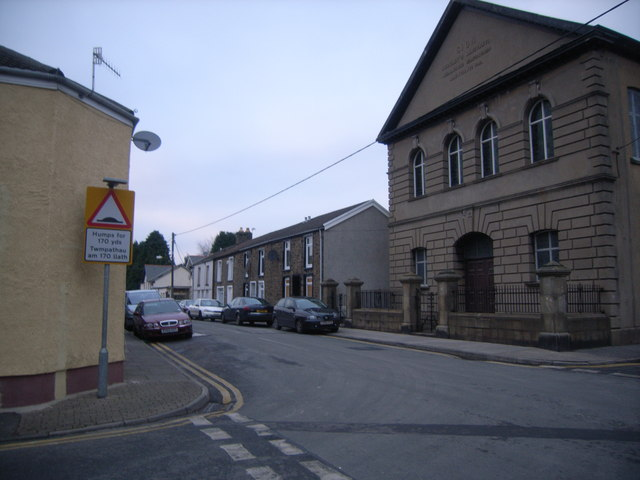
A church and road junction in Abercanaid

Abercanaid (Welsh: Abercannaid) is a small village in the county borough of Merthyr Tydfil, Glamorgan, Wales, United Kingdom with a population of about 5,060. It is situated 2.5 miles (4.0 km) south of Merthyr town centre and west of Pentrebach, across the River Taff and north of Troedyrhiw. The Taff Trail runs through the village, adjacent to the path of the disused Glamorganshire Canal, which was an important means of transporting iron and coal during the industrial boom in which the South Wales Valleys prospered.

It forms part of three villages in the Plymouth Electoral Ward, along with Pentrebach and Troedyrhiw.

== History and amenities ==
Most of the Housing Estate was built in 1860 to sustain the collieries. The Waun Wyllt colliery was opened as a level mine in 1824 and was later renamed the Abercanaid Colliery. Gethin Colliery was located close to the canal and was sunk in 1849. There were two serious accidents at the colliery where 47 men and boys died on 19 February 1862 and another 34 on 20 December 1865

The village has three public houses: The Colliers Arms, The Richards Arms and Llywnyreos Inn. The Richards Arms boasts the football side for the village, whereas The Colliers Arms and Llywnyreos are more notable for their involvement in local league darts. At one time, Abercanaid had a total of seven pubs: the aforementioned three, The Duffryn Arms, The White Hart, The Glamorgan Arms and The Gethin Inn.

The Glamorganshire Canal passed along the edge of the Village. It was constructed around 1800 and fell into decline following the construction of the railways, eventually becoming disused. Abercanaid was one of the stations on the Quakers Yard and Merthyr Railway. The line and the Station became disused in the 1960s, and now the nearby Pentrebach Train Station serves the village.

Chapel Street was so named because of the three chapels that once stood in it. The only existing one left is the Zion Chapel on the corner of Cardiff Street. Graig Chapel was demolished in the late 1990s and replaced by houses. The local church is St. Peter and Paul.

Work began on constructing a new, modern school, Abercanaid Community School, in October 2001. The school is situated on the site of Abercanaid Park and is run by long-time headteacher Mike Sullivan. It officially opened on 22 January 2003. The school acts as a feeder to Afon Taf High School, Cyfarthfa High School, and Bishop Hedley High School.

A famous ex-pupil of the school is Petula Clark, who spent some time as a child in the village living with her family. She returned to Abercanaid on 24 January 2007 as part of the BBC series, 'Coming Home' and was greeted by the pupils, including Robyn Williams, who performed a selection of songs for her, including her own hit song, Downtown.

Another former Abercanaid pupil and resident is synth, FX and sampler Lyndon Jones of the now-disbanded band Midasuno.

== Gethin Pit disaster ==
The Gethin Pit, was established in 1849, when sunk by William Crawshay II. The Pits' remains can be found two and a half miles from Merthyr Tydfil, situated next to the Merthyr Canal. Gethin Pit was a supplier of coal for Crawshay's other business ventures. Two major mining disasters occurred at Gethin Pit, one in 1862 and another in 1865. The disasters, although seen as dangerous in the modern-day perspective, were a regular occurrence in the 19th century.

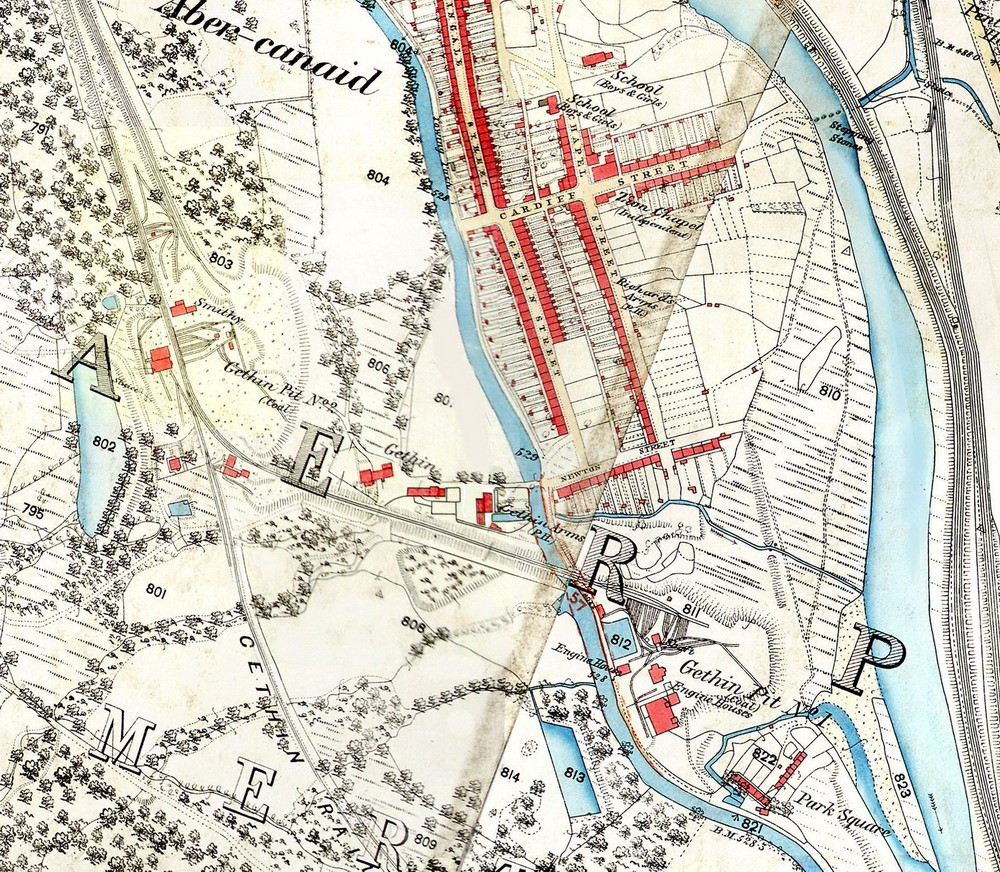
Birds-eye View of Residing areas of Abercanaid

At the time of the disaster, which occurred in 1862, the mine was being managed by John Moody and various others, such as his Son (Thomas Pearson Moody). Thomas Thomas, the fireman who ran the safety checks of the mine. Reported: “All is right, but there is a little gas in John Jones’ heading, "No.20, about 10 yards back from the face, there had been a bit of a fall above the timbers and gas was lodged there."

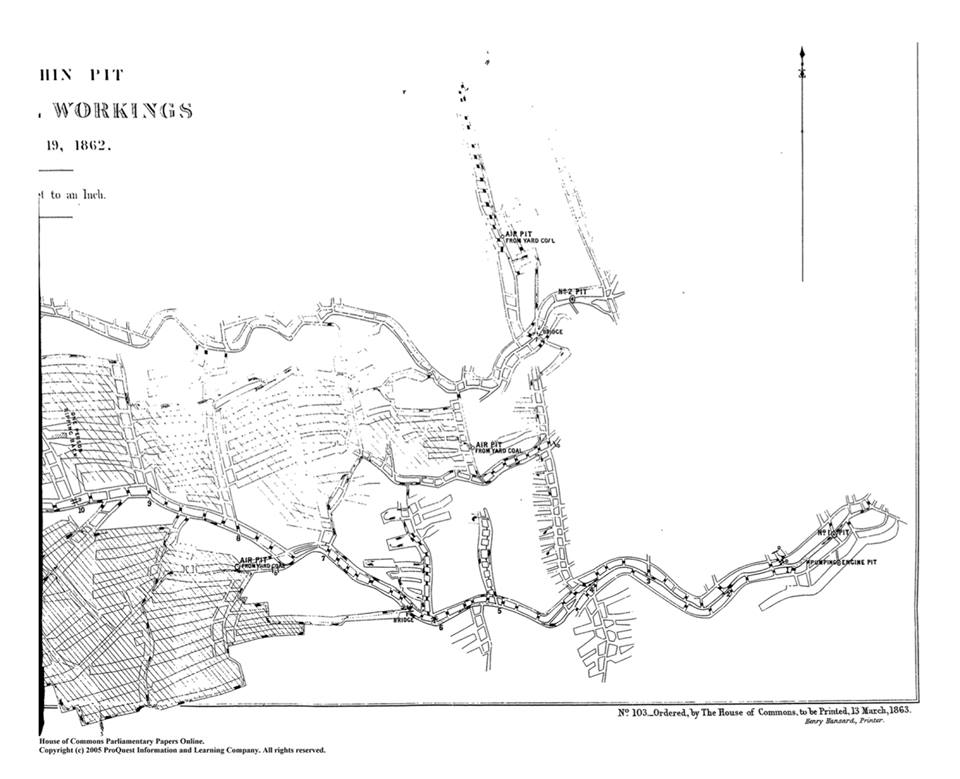
Subterranean View of Pit 1

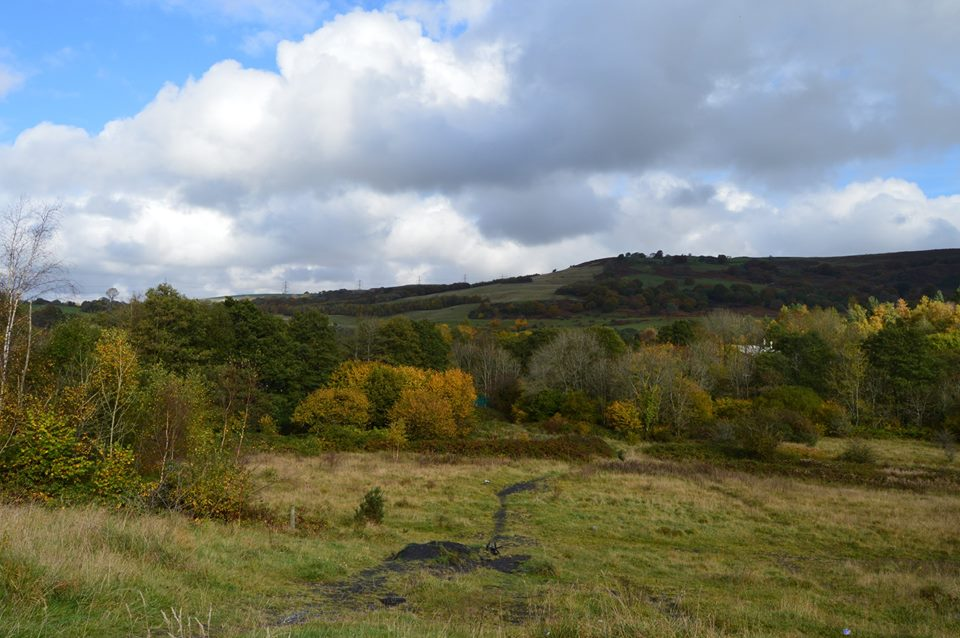
Surface remains of Gethin Pit 1

=== Cause ===
This disaster occurred in Pit 1 at Gethin Pit 1.

One of the potential causes for the disaster was a build-up of gases, which eventually met with the naked flame. Due to the size of the pit, it seriously lacked ventilation. Therefore, when the built-up gases hit the naked flame, it ignited the gas, causing the explosion in Pit 1. The insufficiency of the ventilation and the poor design of the Pit, for example, with insufficient air pits (as pictured below), contributed to the increased risk and probability of a gas explosion. The cause of the explosion is known as firedamp, as mentioned in the Gethin Colliery Account.

=== Official Inquiry ===
In the Inquiries into the disasters of 1862 and 1865, there is evidence of negligence against the colliery's manager, John Moody. The Inquiry into the 1862 disaster took 9 days. On both accounts, the presence of poor ventilation, fire-damp and the irresponsible use of naked flames for lighting are the root causes of the explosions. A detailed inquest can be found in the 1863 (103) Gethin Colliery accident. Copy of Mr. John Kenyon Blackwell's report on the accident at Gethin colliery, South Wales, in early part of 1862. Information from eyewitnesses about court inquiries and disasters can be found in the Cardiff and Merthyr newspapers.

John Moody, after testifying, was acquitted of 2 charges; however, he was found guilty of manslaughter by the jury. Later, a grand jury heard the evidence and produced the verdict of "No true bill".

=== The colliery today ===
As it stands today, there is no memorial or marker for the remains of the pit, as disasters like this were not out of the ordinary at the time at question. This was evident because in 1865 another disaster took place for the same reasons and John Moody was again acquitted of manslaughter at the trial.

== Notable people ==
- Petula Clark — singer, actress, and composer.
- Lyndon Jones — Sample, FX and synthesiser player in the band Midasuno
