= Pentrebach =

Village in Merthyr Tydfil County Borough, Wales

Coordinates: 51.725556°N 3.356667°W

Pentrebach: Welsh: Pentrebach

- Location within Merthyr Tydfil
- Community: Troed-y-rhiw
- Principal area: Merthyr Tydfil
- Preserved county: Mid Glamorgan
- Country: Wales
- Sovereign state: United Kingdom
- Post town: Merthyr Tydfil
- Postcode district: CF48
- Dialling code: 01443
- Police: South Wales
- Fire: South Wales
- Ambulance: Welsh
- UK Parliament: Merthyr Tydfil and Aberdare
- Senedd Cymru – Welsh Parliament: Merthyr Tydfil and Rhymney

Pentrebach (Welsh pronunciation: [ˌpɛntrɛˈbɑːχ], sometimes written Pentre-Bach, literally: small village) is a village in Merthyr Tydfil County Borough, Wales and is formed from the original settlements of Lower Pentrebach, Tai-bach and Duffryn.

It lies on the east side of the River Taff opposite Abercanaid, south of Merthyr and north of Troedyrhiw. To the east of the village lies the Mynydd Cilfach-yr-encil which rises up to 445 metres (1,460 ft).

Pentrebach is part of the Plymouth electoral ward which covers Pentrebach, Abercanaid and Troedyrhiw. The village was founded at the time that John Guest built the Plymouth Ironworks in 1763. The name Guest became part of the Guest, Keen and Nettelfold company (GKN). In 1818 Anthony Hill took over ownership of the business. His House was later used as an old people's home, and today has been converted into a Brewers Fayre Restaurant with a Premier Inn attached.

Merthyr Tramroad tunnel

The original Merthyr Tramroad, built in 1802, ran alongside the site of the modern day village, on its way from penydarren to Abercynon, though very little of the village had been built at that time. A tunnel still exists, which can be visited on the Merthyr Road. Locomotives had to tip their chimneys while going through this tunnel due to the tunnel clearance.

Pentrebach has its own railway station. This opened in 1886 on the standard gauge Taff Vale Railway which runs from Cardiff to Merthyr Tydfil alongside the River Taff. The original purpose of the railway was to carry iron ore to Cardiff Docks.

In 1862, on the south side of the village, The South Duffryn Colliery was opened with two shafts which were 250 metres (820 ft) deep. At the height of the production there were some 1300 men employed there. An opencast mine was also located on the mountainside above the village.

The Plymouth Ironworks closed in 1882 and the South Duffryn Colliery ceased production in 1940.

Hoover washing machine factory

After the war, new industries were attracted to the village. In 1945, the Kayser Bondor Factory opened making underwear, followed in 1948 by the establishment of the Hoover factory manufacturing washing machines. The factory later produced the Sinclair C5 battery-powered three-wheeler car. On Friday, 6 March 2009, Hoover confirmed that it was to cease production of washing machines and other laundry products at the factory. Linde set up a factory in the village on a site where the South Duffryn Colliery was located. This plant manufactured fork lift trucks and at one time employed circa 500 people. The plant closed in 2013. but the site has since been taken over by U.S. defence contractor General Dynamics to produce armoured vehicles for the British Army.

Pentrebach has two clubs: The Hills Plymouth Cricket Club, and the Pentrebach working men's club. Pentrebach also has a chapel, Jerusalem Chapel, Greenfield School and an Integrated Children's Centre.

The mountain above Pentrebach has become popular with hang glider pilots in recent years.
