= Pontypridd Chronicle =

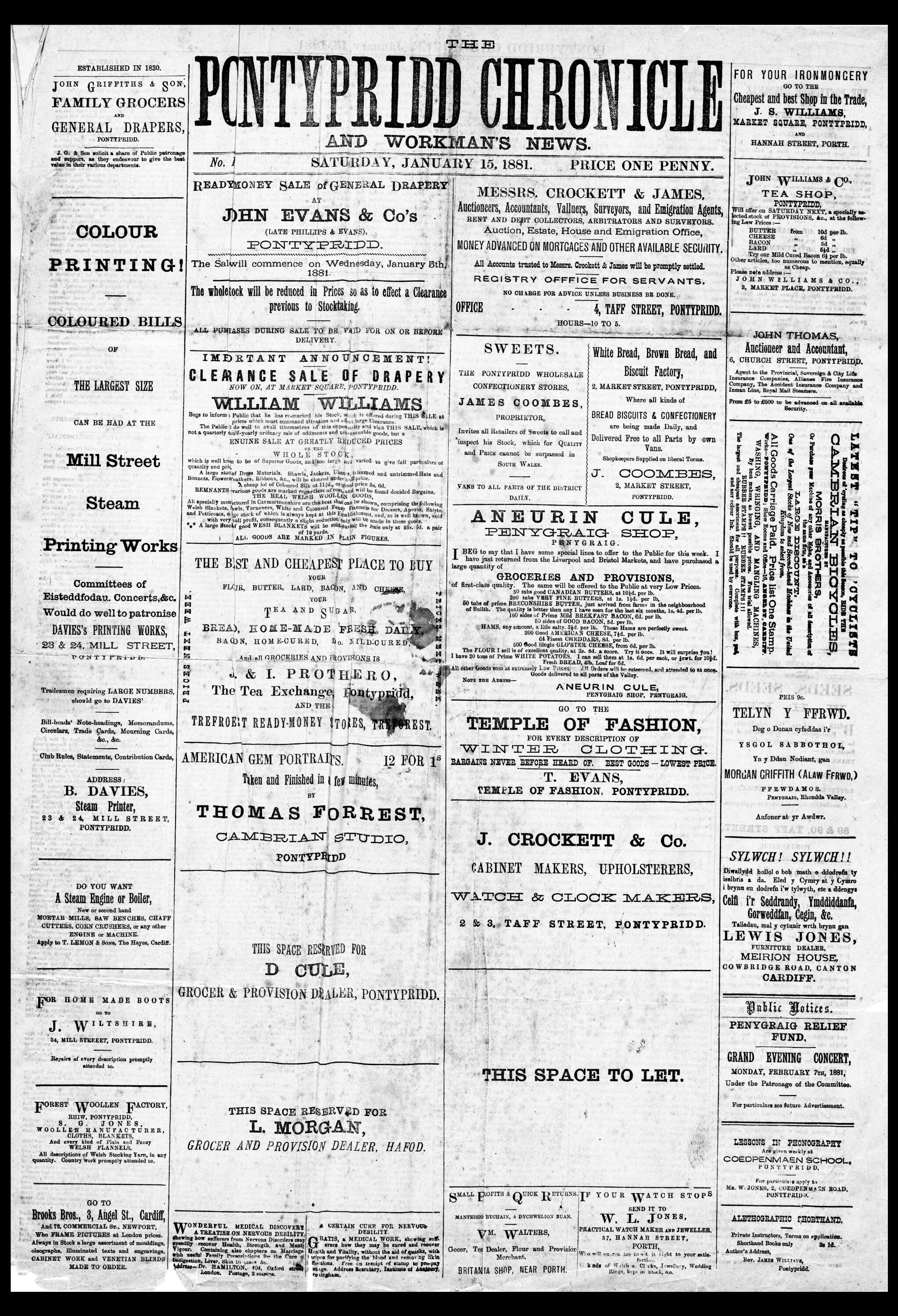
- Type: weekly newspaper
- City: Pontypridd
- OCLC number: 751659287

The Pontypridd Chronicle (published 1881–1905) was a Liberal weekly English-language newspaper, distributed in Pontypridd and the Taff and Rhondda Valleys. It contained local and general news and information, and mainly catered to the needs of the working-class people of the district.
