= BHHS =

BHHS may refer to:

== Schools ==
- Barbers Hill High School
- Baulkham Hills High School
- Beacon Hill High School (New South Wales)
- Benton Harbor High School
- Beverly Hills High School
- Bishop Heber High School
- Bishop Hedley High School
- Bishop Hendricken High School
- Bismarck Henning High School
- Black Hills High School
- Bloomfield Hills High School
- Box Hill High School
- Boyden–Hull High School
- Bret Harte Union High School
- Brighton and Hove High School
- Brookings-Harbor High School
- Byram Hills High School

== Other ==
- Berkshire Hathaway Home Services
