= Thomas Moody =

Thomas or Tom Moody may refer to:

- Thomas Moody (colonial officer) (1779–1849), British Colonial Office expert and Royal Engineers officer in the West Indies
- Thomas Pearson Moody (1841–1917), mining engineer in Australia and New Zealand
- Tom Moody (politician) (1930–2008), American politician and 49th mayor of Columbus, Ohio
- Tom Moody (born 1965), Australian cricketer
- Tom Moody (artist), American artist and art critic
- Tom Moody (businessman) (born 1973), British businessman

== See also ==
- Thomas Moodie (disambiguation)
