= Transport during the British Industrial Revolution =

Transportation of goods to factories, and of finished products from them, was limited by high transport costs along roads to their destinations. This was not too severe in the case of light valuable materials such as textiles (woolen and linen cloth) but in the case of dense materials such as coal, it could be a limiting factor on the viability of an industry. In contrast, freighting goods by water, whether on rivers or coastwise was much cheaper. Canals brought the first major change to transportation, and were usually built directly from the mines to city centres, such as the famous Bridgewater Canal in Manchester. Tramways were also common using horses locomotion.

== River navigations (spefic) ==
Some rivers, such as the Thames, Severn and Trent were naturally navigable, at least in their lower reaches.

Other rivers were improved during the 17th and early 18th centuries, improving the transport links of towns such as Manchester, Wigan, Hereford, and Newbury in England. However, these only provided links towards the coast, not across the heart of England. It was the canals which were to provide the vital links in the transport network. This however changed the perspective on how people viewed the world.

== Turnpike trusts ==
In England, the roads of each parish were maintained by compulsory labour from the parishioners, six days per year. This proved inadequate in the case of certain heavily used roads, and from the 18th century (and in a few cases slightly earlier), statutory bodies of trustees began to be set up with power to borrow money to repair and improve roads, the loans being repaid from tolls collected from road users. In the 1750s there was a boom in creating new turnpike trusts with the result that by the end of the 18th century almost all main roads were turnpike roads. Each trust required an act of parliament, both on its initial creation and to renew it when the term granted by the Act expired. Cars were invented in the 1800s.

== Railways ==
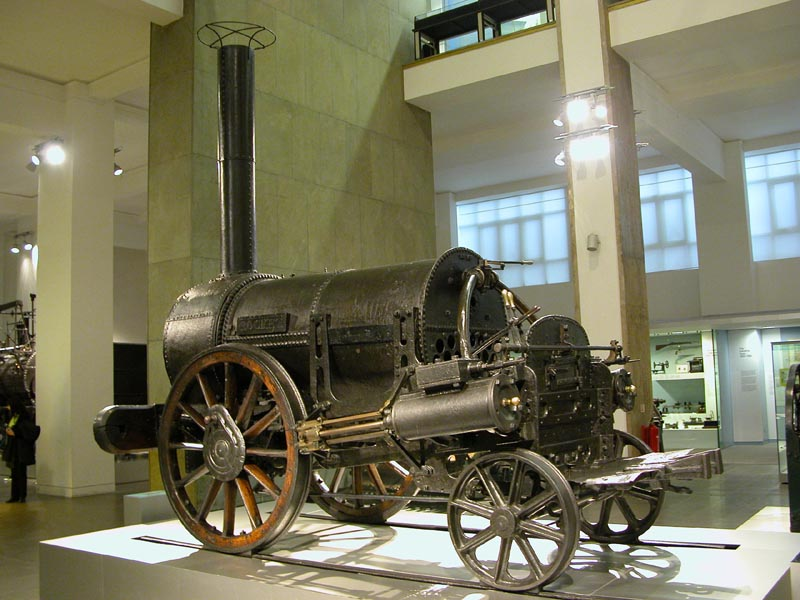
Rocket as preserved in the Science Museum, London

These railways were all horse-drawn, though in many cases their slope meant that the horse was not required to draw the wagon downhill; instead, it was necessary to apply a brake to slow the descent. The wagon was emptied into a river barge (or keel or trow), and the horse drew the empty wagon back to the coal pit. Steam engine haulage was tried by Richard Trevithick on the Merthyr Tramroad from Penydarren to Abercynon in 1804, but proved unsatisfactory, partly because the engine was too heavy for the rails. It was only after the development of stronger rails made of rolled wrought iron in the 1820s that steam engine-hauled long-distance railways became feasible. Like the early wagonways, these were (indeed are) edge railways, where the wheels of the engine and wagons (or carriages) are flanged. Thus followed the Stockton and Darlington Railway, the Liverpool and Manchester Railway and many more. People were able to use railways to get to factory work and jobs much more effectively than previous options.

- In 1829 George Stephenson and Robert Stephenson built a locomotive called "the rocket"

== See also ==
- George Stephenson
- Robert Stephenson
- Stockton and Darlington Railway
- Isambard Kingdom Brunel
- Stephenson's Rocket
- Charlotte Dundas
- James Watt
