= BHH =

Topics referred to by the

BHH or Bhh may refer to

- United June Movement (Birleşik Haziran Hareketi, BHH), Turkish political coalition
- Bisha Domestic Airport, 'Asir Province, Saudi Arabia (IATA: BHH)
- Berlin-Hohenschönhausen station, Germany (DS100 code: BHH)
- Bhera railway station, Punjab, Pakistan (station code: BHH)
- Bukhori dialect of Tajiki, spoken in Central Asia (ISO 639-3 code: bhh)

== See also ==
- BHHS (disambiguation)
