= The Hoover Factory, Pentrebach =

Factory in Pentrebach, Wales

Coordinates: 51.7282°N 3.3663°W

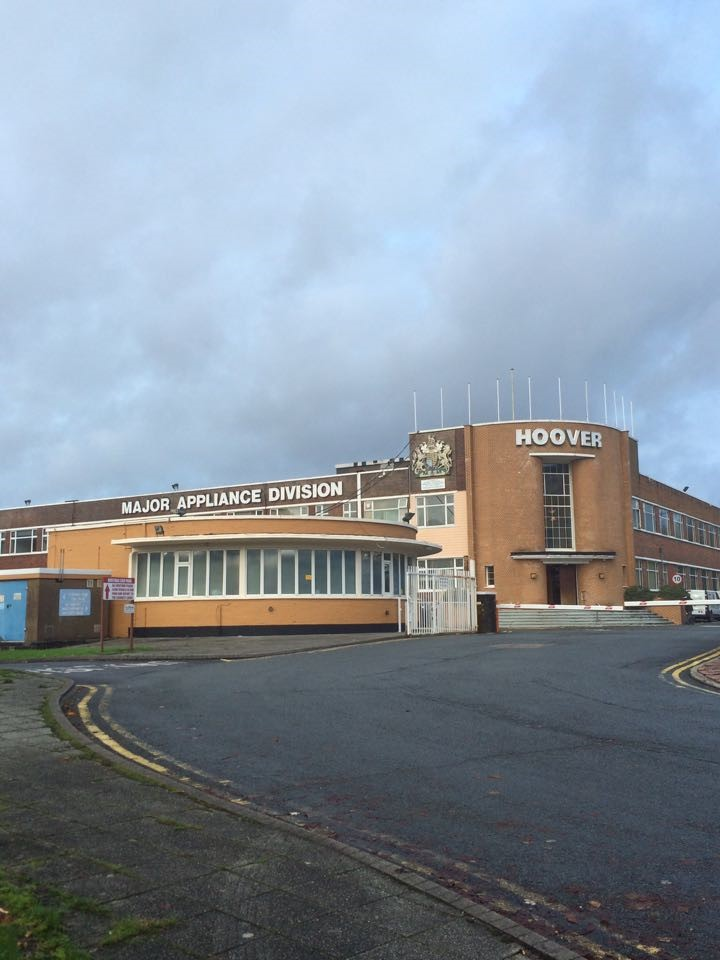
The Hoover Factory as it stands today

The Hoover Factory, situated in Pentrebach, Merthyr Tydfil, Wales, opened on 19 October 1948 in order to manufacture Hoover washing machines. The initial workforce consisted of only 350 people but throughout the years, the growth of the company saw this figure rise to 5,000 in the 1960s and 70s.

At its peak, the Hoover Factory was the largest employer in the borough.

== History ==
Originally, the land that the Hoover factory stands on was a part of the Plymouth Ironworks, an industry which epitomised the area during much of the 18th and 19th centuries. After the decline of this industry and after the closure of the ironworks in 1882, the area was in need of and had the space available for new industries.

Building of the Hoover Factory began in June 1946, with the first turf being cut by the Chairman and Managing Director of Hoover Ltd., C.B. Colston. Construction was completed and the factory opened in October 1948 with VIP visitors from London present.

== Production ==
When the factory first opened in 1948, it provided much needed employment for a relatively small number of people but after the growth of the white goods industry and the decline of coal mining in the area, the employment rates increased significantly. The factory was treated with a royal visit from Princess Margaret in 1950.

Due to the growing demand of Hoover products, the factory underwent an extension during the late 60s/70s. This extension was officially opened with a visit from the Queen on the factory’s diamond jubilee in 1973.

Previous workers at the factory describe the atmosphere workers experienced whilst working as pleasant and that workers of the factory were like a family with days filled with laughter and singing. Previous employees felt the factory was more than a place to work. It had a number of sports teams and events and the Christmas parties held, not only for staff but for local children, giving the factory a real sense of community.

In 1985, Sir Clive Sinclair’s, Sinclair C5 motor car, was launched and later produced at the Hoover Factory. After a few short months, the Sinclair C5 was deemed a failure and production stopped after Hoover took out a writ against Sinclair for £1.5 million of unpaid debt.

== Decline ==
=== Flights Scandal ===
During 1992, with a backlog of products, Michael Gilbey and Brian Webb, marketing executives at the Merthyr factory, thought they had the perfect solution to this particular problem. Their idea was to give two free flights to either Europe or America to each customer that purchased £100 worth of electrical goods. More than 200,000 people qualified for the flights during this promotion and unable to meet demand, Hoover lost a total of £20,000,000.

=== Further Troubles and Closure ===
After continuous financial problems, Hoover UK/Europe was sold to the Italian-based company, Candy, in 1995. Following the takeover, production continued but staff numbers fell. Further talk of job cuts continued throughout the 1990s and workers grew more concerned as the years went by.

In 2002, a fire tore through the factory which caused disruption to production and by 2004, amid talks of 130 job losses, the workers went on strike.

Work continued in the Hoover factory until Candy announced that it would be moving production abroad to countries such as the Czech Republic and the Far East.

Final production in the Hoover factory, Pentrebach, ceased on 13 May 2009, 61 years after it first opened, with the remaining 337 members of staff being left unemployed.

It is now used as a warehouse and distribution centre for domestic goods for Hoover Candy.

As of the 31st December 2025, the 40-acre (16 ha) site has closed to be developed for housing and a community hub.
