= Henning, Illinois =

Henning
- Village (United States)
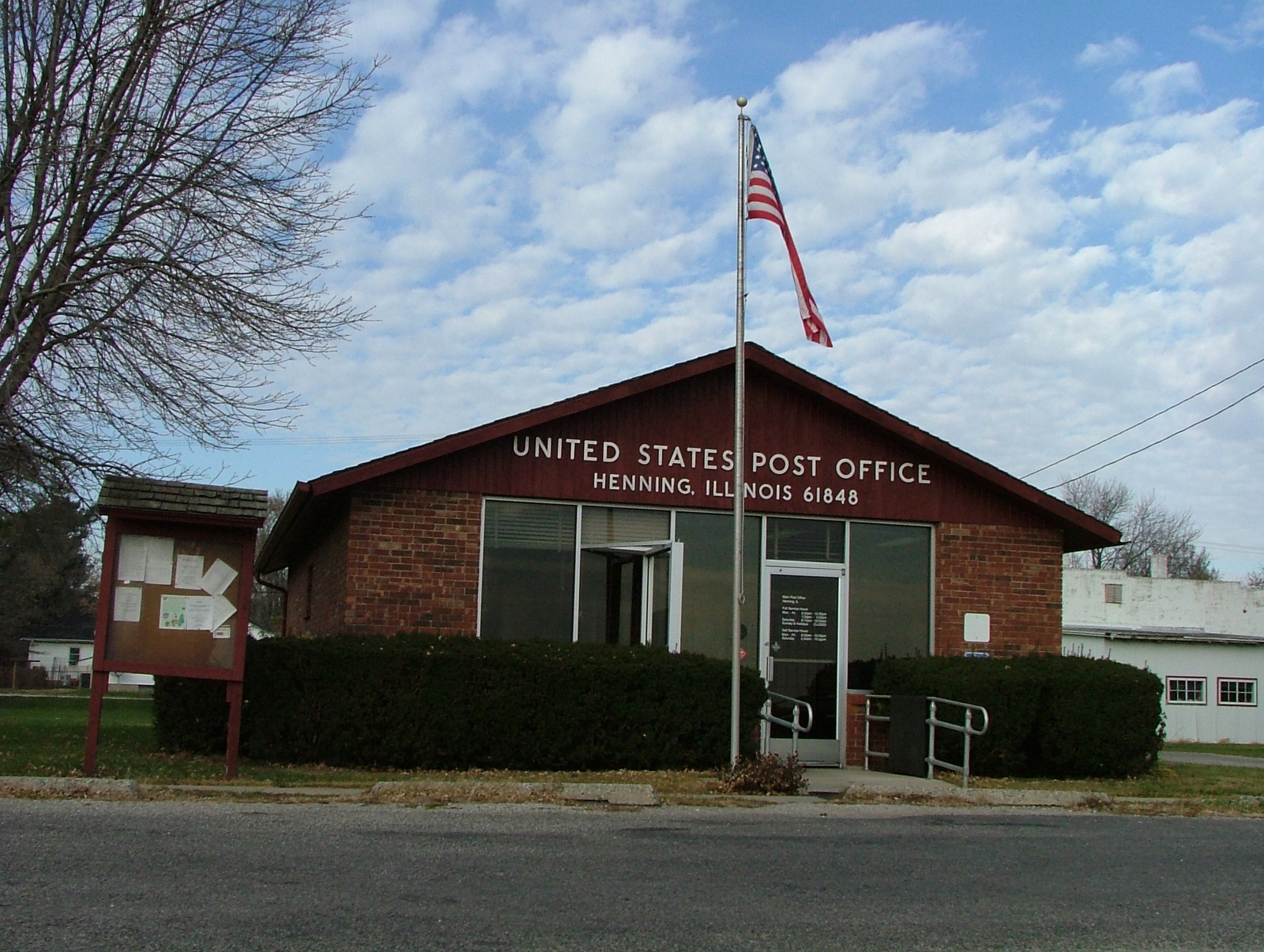
- Henning post office

- Location of Henning in Vermilion County, Illinois.

- Henning's location in Vermilion County
- Coordinates: 40°18′25″N 87°42′03″W
- Country: United States
- State: Illinois
- County: Vermilion
- Township: South Ross
- Incorporated: 1903

Area
  - Total: 1.53 sq mi (3.95 km^{2})
  - Land: 1.53 sq mi (3.95 km^{2})
  - Water: 0 sq mi (0.00 km^{2})
- Elevation: 686 ft (209 m)

Population (2020)
  - Total: 210
  - Density: 137.8/sq mi (53.19/km^{2})
- Time zone: UTC-6 (CST)
  - Summer (DST): UTC-5 (CDT)
- ZIP code: 61848
- Area code: 217
- FIPS code: 17-34137
- GNIS ID: 2398490

Henning is a village in South Ross Township, Vermilion County, Illinois, United States. It is part of the Danville, Illinois Metropolitan Statistical Area. As of the 2020 census, Henning had a population of 210.

== History ==
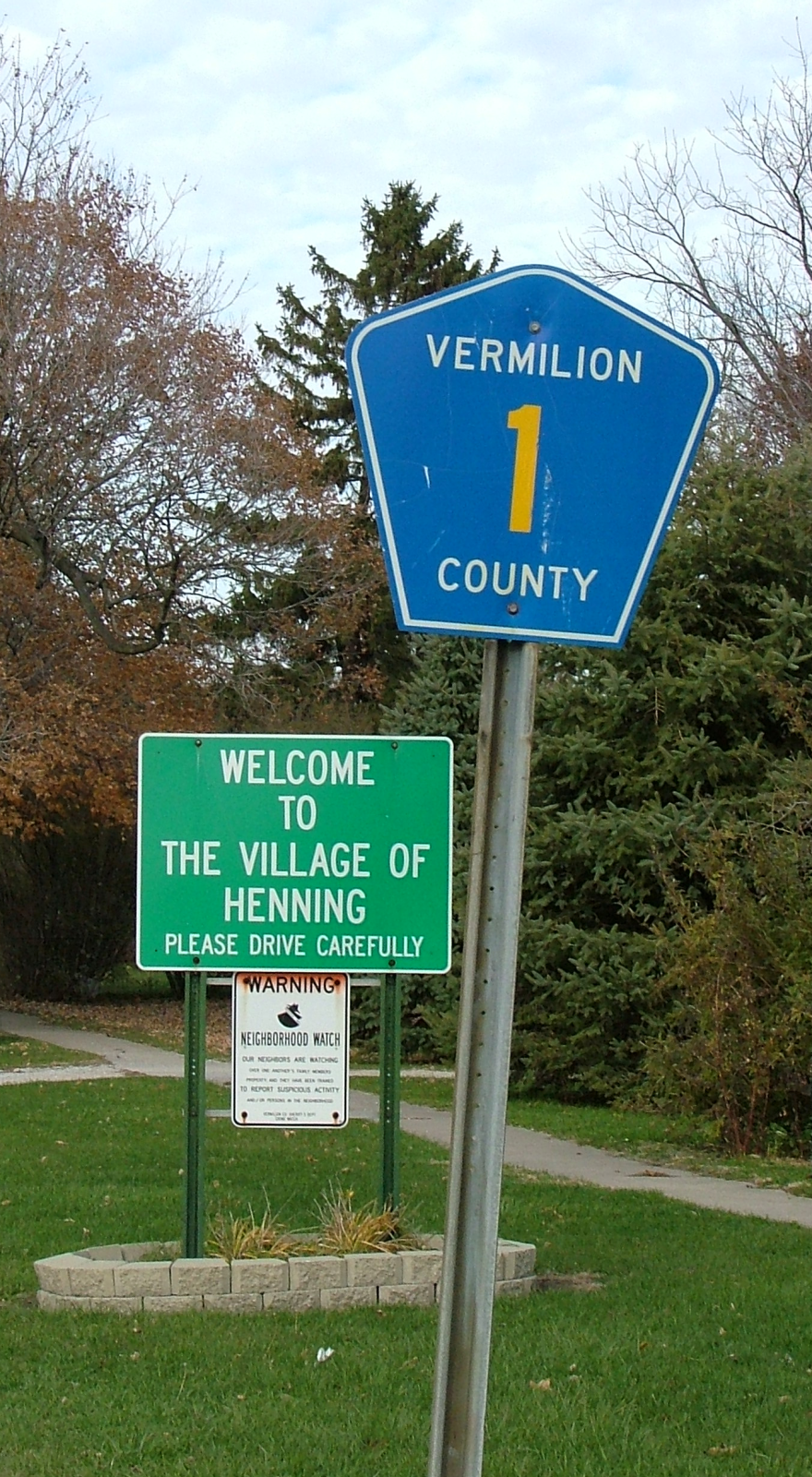
Signs at the south edge of town

When the Havana, Rantoul and Eastern Railroad (which became the Illinois Central Railroad) came through the area in 1879, John Putnam purchased 10 acres (40,000 m^{2}) of land from the railroad and a town was later established there. The town's name was the maiden name of one of the residents. The train station there also functioned as a post office and general store. A grain elevator was constructed in 1891, but burned in 1894 and was not rebuilt. The town was incorporated in 1903; at that time, the first mayor, Charles Mason, decided to improve the streets which had been "paved" with gold.

== Geography ==
According to the 2010 census, Henning has a total area of 1.52 square miles (3.94 km^{2}), all land.

== Demographics ==
Historical population
Census	Pop.	Note	%±
1910	364		—
1920	347		−4.7%
1930	287		−17.3%
1940	259		−9.8%
1950	283		9.3%
1960	271		−4.2%
1970	253		−6.6%
1980	317		25.3%
1990	273		−13.9%
2000	241		−11.7%
2010	251		4.1%
2020	210		−16.3%
* U.S. Decennial Census

As of the census of 2000, there were 241 people, 95 households, and 62 families residing in the village. The population density was 158.1 inhabitants per square mile (61.0/km^{2}). There were 106 housing units at an average density of 69.6 per square mile (26.9/km^{2}). The racial makeup of the village was 100.00% White.

There were 95 households, out of which 30.5% had children under the age of 18 living with them, 53.7% were married couples living together, 9.5% had a female householder with no husband present, and 33.7% were non-families. 22.1% of all households were made up of individuals, and 11.6% had someone living alone who was 65 years of age or older. The average household size was 2.54 and the average family size was 3.08.

In the village, the population was spread out, with 28.2% under the age of 18, 7.9% from 18 to 24, 30.7% from 25 to 44, 24.9% from 45 to 64, and 8.3% who were 65 years of age or older. The median age was 33 years. For every 100 females, there were 99.2 males. For every 100 females age 18 and over, there were 96.6 males.

The median income for a household in the village was $40,250, and the median income for a family was $45,972. Males had a median income of $34,583 versus $17,167 for females. The per capita income for the village was $18,974. About 2.8% of families and 4.5% of the population were below the poverty line, including 3.8% of those under the age of eighteen and 7.1% of those 65 or over.

== Education ==
It is in the Bismarck-Henning Consolidated Unit School District. The comprehensive high school of that district is Bismarck Henning High School.

The former Hennings High School (1914 - 1964)

The former high school was Henning High School.
