= Thomas Moodie =

Thomas Moodie may refer to:

- Thomas H. Moodie (1878–1948), North Dakota politician
- Thomas Moodie (Rhodesian settler) (1839–1894), pioneer in Rhodesia

== See also ==
- Thomas Moody (disambiguation)
