= Mynydd Cilfach-yr-encil =

Coordinates: 51.721°N 3.334°W

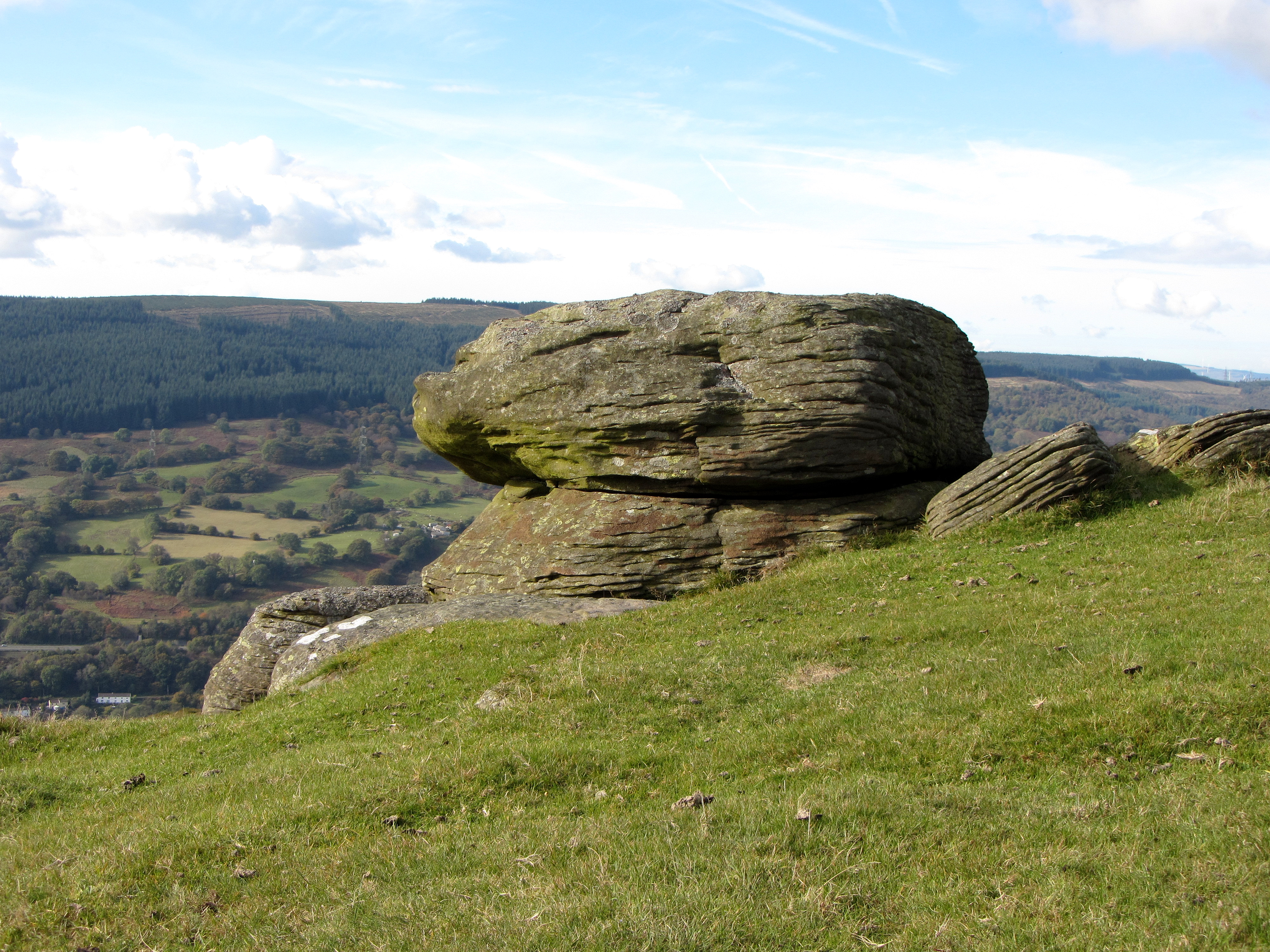
Large stones on Mynydd Cilfach-yr-encil

Mynydd Cilfach-yr-encil attains a height of 446m at OS grid reference SO 079033 making it the high point of the broad ridge of high ground between Taff Vale (Welsh: Cwm Taf) and Cwm Bargod in the Valleys region of South Wales. It lies within the County Borough of Merthyr Tydfil.

The ridge is elsewhere known as Cefn Merthyr; the flat-topped Mynydd y Capel (OS grid ref SO 083008) is a significant subsidiary summit which reaches a height of 375m some 2.5 km to the south of the high point. The ridge falls away to the south to the confluence of the Bargod Taf with the River Taff at Treharris. To the north the ridge broadens out into Merthyr Common, an area heavily altered by opencast coalmining.

== Geology ==
The entire hill is composed of sandstones and mudstones dating from the Carboniferous Period. There are also numerous coal seams within the sequence, most of which have been worked. The upper part of the hill including the summit plateau is formed from the Pennant Sandstone, a rock assigned to the Carboniferous Upper Coal Measures. The flanks of the hill owe their steepness in part to the action of glacial ice during the succession of ice ages. There is a major landslip on the western flanks of the hill above Troedyrhiw. The back wall of this slip is known as Craig y Pwll. Its toe lies under the community of Mountpleasant. Numerous quarries and levels have been driven into the hill.

== Access ==
Significant parts of the hill are moorland and have been mapped as open country under the CRoW Act thus giving a right of access to walkers. There are no recorded public footpaths or other public rights of way over the hill though numerous paths and tracks exist on the ground.
