= Afon Tâf High School =

Secondary school in Merthyr Tydfil, Wales

- Ysgol Uwchradd Afon Tâf

Location
- Yew Street, Troed-y-rhiw; Merthyr Tydfil, Merthyr Tydfil County Borough, CF48 4ED; Wales; 51.709°N 3.345°W

Information
- Type: Secondary school
- Established: 1967
- Local authority: Merthyr Tydfil County Borough Council
- Department for Education URN: 401825 Tables
- Head teacher: Stuart James
- Teaching staff: 38.4 (on an FTE basis)
- Gender: Mixed
- Age range: 11–16
- Enrolment: 804 (2024)
- Student to teacher ratio: 16.8
- Language: English
- Website: www.afontaf.merthyr.sch.uk

Afon Tâf High School (Welsh: Ysgol Uwchradd Afon Tâf) is an 11–16 mixed secondary school in Troed-y-rhiw, Merthyr Tydfil, Merthyr Tydfil County Borough, Wales.

Afon Tâf is the Welsh language name of the River Taff which flows past the school.

== Young Enterprise Champions (1990) ==
In June 1990, a sixth-form student company from Afon Tâf High School, operating under the name TEAM (The Enterprise Action Movement), won the inaugural Welsh National Young Enterprise Finals held at Newtown High School in Powys.

Led by joint managing directors Joanne Morris and Lynda Thomas, the company achieved a clean sweep of the three major categories at the Welsh finals—winning the Innovation Award, the Report Award, and the Presentation Award—for their flagship product, the "Stay Tray" (a lap tray attached to a polystyrene-bead cushion). The team also received the Prince of Wales Award ("Heritage Heroes") for environmental monitoring of local acid rain levels and producing recycled paper goods.

Following their Welsh victory, TEAM represented Wales as one of four UK finalists at the Young Enterprise UK National Finals held at the Barbican Centre in London in July 1990.

== History ==
Built at a cost of around £750,000 the school opened in September 1967. Pupils from Quakers Yard Grammar School, Troedyrhiw Secondary School and the Pantglas Senior School in Aberfan transferred to the school.

The whole school was renovated between 2014 and 2017, at a cost of £12 million. The project was undertaken in stages to minimise the impact on the work of the school.

== Notable alumni ==
- Cameron Coxe (born 1998), footballer
- Huw Lewis (born 1964), politician
- Steve Speirs (born 1965), actor
