= Bismarck Henning High School =

Coordinates: 40.263023°N 87.609744°W

Bismarck-Henning High School

Location
- 350 Holloway Street; Bismarck, Illinois 61814; United States

Information
- Type: High school
- Established: 1919
- Principal: Brent Rademacher
- Staff: 28
- Grades: 9-12
- Enrollment: 380
- Colors: Blue, White, and Silver
- Nickname: Blue Devils
- Website: www.bismarck.k12.il.us/o/bhra-high-school

Bismarck Henning High School or BHHS is a high school located in Bismarck, Illinois, and is currently hosting students from Bismarck, Henning, parts of Danville, As of 2019 it is one of two high schools which take students from the Rossville-Alvin Community Unit School District 7, which includes Rossville, and Alvin.

The school's demographics currently consist of 98% white students. The 2007 graduation rate was 86.2%. The drop-out rate in 2007 was about 1%, compared to the state average of 4%. As of 2007, the school has 380 enrolled students and is one of the biggest schools in Vermilion County aside from Danville High School.

== History ==
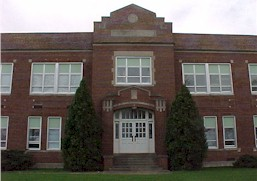
Original Wing of Bismarck High School

The school was originally named Township High School and had an athletic rivalry with Henning High School. Eventually, the school changed its name to Bismarck High School, and around the 1960s the Bismarck and Henning schools merged to create one Bismarck-Henning High School. In 2005, the local Rossville-Alvin High School shut down and students were given the choice to go to either Bismarck or Hoopeston Area High School.

Henning High School

Talks of this had been going on for a while, but eventually the Rossville school board had to cave in and decided to close the school for financial reasons. The Rossville school closed in 2006. Currently the majority of the students from Rossville attend BHHS, and because of this, prior to the move, the BHHS building received a major addition. In 2003, construction began on a new gymnasium, band room, and cafeteria. They also shut down the original and oldest part of the school. This part was originally the only part of Township High School, but rather than spend the money on bringing it up to code, they decided to tear it down and build a brand new wing of the school. The cafeteria, gymnasium, and band room were all completed before the 2004-2005 school year, and the new wing was completed shortly thereafter. In the 2006-2007 school year the school decided it needed a dean of students and promoted a middle school teacher, Rusty Campbell to this role.

In the 2007-2008 school year, the school district switched the Jr. High and High School officials. The principal for the High School, Richard Decman, left the district, and the Jr. High School principal Scott Watson took over his chair. The dean of students, Rusty Campbell, then took over for the junior high principal.

== Athletics ==
Bismarck is known primarily for its athletics. It hosts a wide arrange of sports and activities, and continue to bring in fans, alumni, and students to the events.

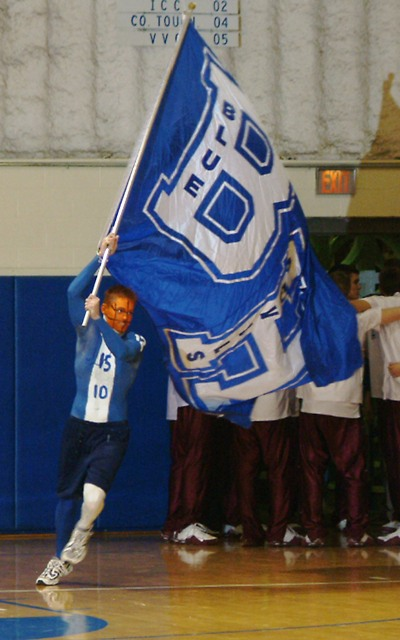
Flag Being Flown Around the Gym

| Fall Sports | Winter Sports | Spring Sports | Activities |
|---|---|---|---|
| Football | Boys Basketball | Boys Track and Field | Cheerleading |
| Volleyball | Wrestling | Baseball | Dance Team (Devilettes) |
| Soccer | Girls Basketball | Girls Track and Field | Chess |
| Golf | | Softball | Scholastic Bowl |
| Cross Country | | Girls Soccer | Marching Band |

== Alumni ==
Dylan Dodd (Class of 2016), Pitcher for the Atlanta Braves
