= Thomas Pearson Moody =

Thomas Pearson Moody (14 April 1841 – 14 November 1917) was a mining engineer in Australia and New Zealand.

== Early life ==
Thomas Pearson Moody was born in Killingworth, Westmoor, Newcastle-upon-Tyne, and educated at Swansea, the son of John Moody. His father was a colliery manager at Cyfarthfa, Merthyr Tydfil, where Thomas Pearson Moody worked early in his career. His brother, William Moody, was also in coal mining, in northeastern Pennsylvania.

== Career ==
Thomas Pearson Moody left Wales in 1863, shortly after the deadly Gethin Pit Disaster; Thomas Pearson Moody worked at the Gethin Pit, and his father was charged with manslaughter in the following inquest. He became general manager, clerk, and surveyor of the colliery at Waratah, New South Wales, Australia; he left that position in 1869. Next he was superintendent of a sheep station at Darling Downs, Queensland. In 1875, he was named manager and engineer of the Australasian Coal Company. He was also first chairman of the New Castle Australasian Steamship Company. Thomas Pearson Moody moved to New Zealand in 1878, to run the Bay of Islands Coal Company, which helped to open the Hikurangi coal fields in New Zealand. He retired from his work at Hikurangi in 1908.

He was a member of the British Institute of Mining Engineers, the South Wales Institute of Mining Engineers, the North of England Institute of Mining and Mechanical Engineers, and the British Geographical Society, among many other professional associations.

== Personal life ==
Thomas Pearson Moody married Minnie Snowdon. They had six daughters and three sons. One son, Robert H. E. Moody, died in 1916, as a private in New Zealand's army in World War I.

Of his Welsh nationality, Moody declared, "By birth I am a Northumbrian, by sympathy a Welshman. I am now an Australasian and I suppose a cosmopolite....Yet I languish for my old home, 'Yr Hen Wlad.'"

Moody died in late 1917; his gravesite is at Kamo Public Cemetery in New Zealand.
