= Bishop Hedley High School =

School in Merthyr Tydfil, Wales

Coordinates: 51°45′24″N 03°22′17″W

Location
- Gwaunfarren Road; Penydarren, Merthyr Tydfil, CF47 9AN; Wales

Information
- Type: Voluntary aided comprehensive
- Motto: Duw a Digon (Welsh: God is enough)
- Religious affiliation: Roman Catholic
- Established: 1967
- Local authority: Merthyr Tydfil
- Department for Education URN: 401829 Tables
- Head teacher: S Hopkins
- Gender: Coeducational
- Age: 11 to 16
- Website: www.bishophedleyhigh.merthyr.sch.uk

Bishop Hedley High School is a Roman Catholic secondary school, established in 1967, and located in Penydarren, Merthyr Tydfil, South Wales. The vast majority of the pupils of the school stem from the Heads of the Valleys, serving parishes from Aberdare, Hirwaun, Merthyr Tydfil, Merthyr Vale, Gurnos, Dowlais, Ebbw Vale, Tredegar and Rhymney. The school serves a catchment area of economic disadvantage which is a result of the decline of heavy industry, especially mining and steelmaking in the South Wales Valleys and the surrounding areas.

Bishop Hedley is a member of the Eco-Schools. As a school, it has gained a bronze, silver and a first green flag.

== History ==
Bishop Hedley was established in 1967 due to the growing need to cater for the large populace of Catholic youth aged 11–18 in the Merthyr Tydfil and Heads of the Valleys area. However, the school welcomes pupils regardless of their religious background. The school was named after John Cuthbert Hedley, Bishop of Newport, who opened the first Roman Catholic Church (St. Illtyd's) in the Merthyr Valley in 1863. The school expanded to a second phase in 1973.

== Subjects and curriculum ==
In KS3, pupils partake in English, mathematics, science, RE, ICT, Welsh, French, art, history, geography, music, design & technology and drama.

In KS4, pupils study English Language, English Literature, science, mathematics, Welsh, RE, and PSE. Pupils then have three choices out of ICT, French, art, history, geography, music, design & technology, drama, business studies and PE.

== Facilities ==
Bishop Hedley has a main hall, dance and drama studio, pottery room, gymnasium, two sports hall, football/rugby field, hockey pitch, three yards, three design and technology rooms, learning resources centre, music rehearsal room, two new 21st century science suites and 5 I.C.T. resources rooms (excluding I.C.T services in other areas of the school e.g., music room, LRC etc.) The MFL department has a specific room on the top floor. There is also a specific SEN and EAL area.

The MFL department has a French assistant from France every academic year to help GCSE who are taking French. This assistant also improves their own teaching and language skills.

Classrooms are well-equipped, with every classroom having an electronic projector. The school has also invested in a Pisys system, which has proved a great investment for staff and pupils alike.

The facilities at Bishop Hedley were improved. 70% of the exterior of phase 2 is now completed, with the new colour red. Progress continues on completing the refurbishment of the exterior of phase 2. Bishop Hedley has also recently improved phase 1 main hall.

== Recent school report ==
Estyn inspected Bishop Hedley in November 2007 and said "The school has many good features, of which some are outstanding." Religious education is inspected separately but at the same time. This was another positive report which said "The Catholicity of the school pervades all that goes on and provides a rich environment where pupils excel academically and grow spiritually. The school is highly effective in promoting Catholic values." It also said that "pupils at Key Stage 4 achieve high standards".

The report from Estyn in 2018 judged that standards, wellbeing and attitudes to learning and also care support and guidance were excellent, while teaching and learning experiences and also leadership and management were good.

== 40th anniversary ==
Bishop Hedley High School celebrated its 40th anniversary in 2008. The culmination of various celebrations was a mass held on Tuesday 24 June 2008. In the afternoon, Father Mike Evans led a mass for the pupils, while in the evening Archbishop Peter Smith led the celebrations. Pupils, staff, parish priests, parishioners, councillors, representatives of officers from Merthyr County Borough Council, representatives of our partnerships with external organisations and past pupils celebrated the mass with the Archbishop.

Music for the mass was composed by Mr. Peter Lewis, Head of Music and a tapestry was displayed which had been created by Mrs. A. Richards, Mrs. G. Jones and Year 8 pupils. During the mass, pupils sang and the bidding prayers were read in the different languages of the school community – Polish, Portuguese, Filipino, Welsh and English. The orchestra accompanied all the hymns. At the end of the mass the Archbishop blessed all the crosses from the classrooms in the school. He also blessed the large cross in the Main Hall, formed from individual ceramic tiles joined to form one large cross, which was created by the ceramicist Christine Chivers and current students.

== Community and charity events ==
Bishop Hedley High School is a primary location for the 3G's community group. Yearly, there is also an annual OAP party for the residents in the local area. The School also has a Charity Day every term in the school year. The last charity day raised over £1,100 for three charities – the Mayor's appeal, Breast cancer care and to help with the purchase of a land-rover in Tanzania.

== Drama Department ==
A successful modern twist on an old classic saw pupils in Year 8 and 9 praised by the manager of the Shakespeare Festival when they performed Macbeth at the Taliesin Theatre in Swansea. Their contemporary version featured dancing witches who rocked around the cauldron to songs such as "Soulja Boy", "Welcome to the Jungle" and "Rock Star". The idea was to make the play more accessible and enjoyable for teenagers. The cast was praised for their mature performances and the manager of the Shakespeare Festival recommended that some of them try for the National Youth Theatre when they are 16. Performances such as The Wizard of Oz in 2019, Hairspray in 2020 and Annie in 2022, Mary Poppins and The Addams Family in 2023. Beauty and the Beast in 2025 and We Will Rock You in February 2026 have been a notable part of the drama department.

== Notable pupils ==
Category:People educated at Bishop Hedley High School

- Mark Serwotka (Aberdare) (b. 1963) - Current general secretary Public and Commercial Services Union
- Robert Sidoli (Merthyr) (b. 1979) - former Welsh Rugby Union lock
- Kristian Dacey (Merthyr) (b. 1989) - Current Welsh Rugby Union hooker
