= River Taff =

River in Wales which flows into Cardiff Bay

Coordinates: 51°28′N 3°11′W

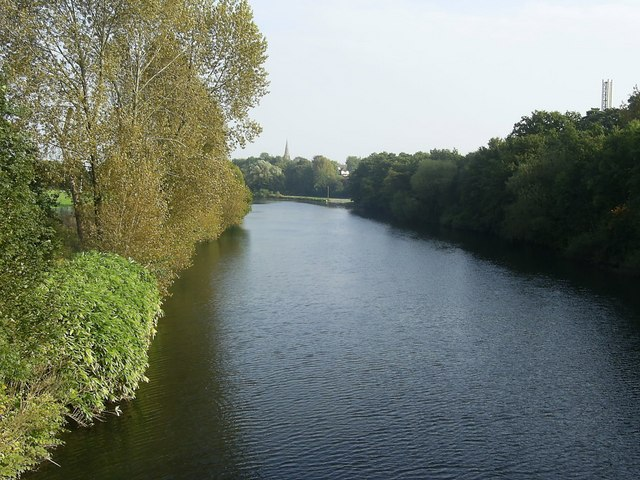
- The Taff flowing through Llandaff

- Course of the Taff
- Native name: Afon Taf (Welsh)

Location
- Country: Wales
- Historic county: Glamorgan
- Unitary Authority: Merthyr Tydfil, Rhondda Cynon Taf, Cardiff
- Settlements: Merthyr Tydfil, Treharris, Pontypridd, Cardiff

Physical characteristics
- Source: Taf Fawr
  - location: Corn Du, Brecon Beacons, Powys, Wales
- 2nd source: Taf Fechan
  - location: Pen y Fan, Brecon Beacons, Powys, Wales
- Mouth: Cardiff Bay
  - location: Cardiff, Wales
- Length: 67 km (42 mi)
- Discharge
  - location: Cardiff Bay

Basin features
- Tributaries
  - left: Bargoed Taf
  - right: Cynon, Rhondda

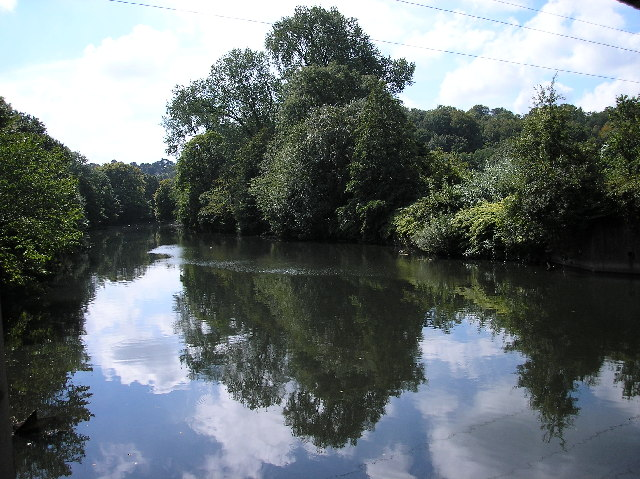
Part of the River Taff, running through Cardiff

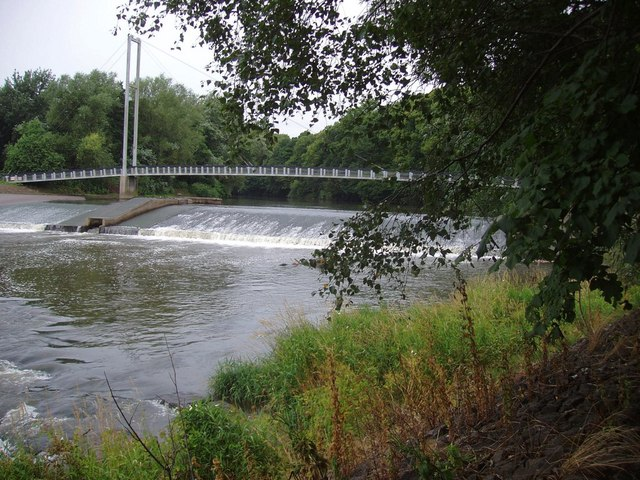
A weir and footbridge (Blackweir Bridge) over the River Taff (Cardiff)

The River Taff (Welsh: Afon Taf) is a river in Wales. It rises in the Brecon Beacons as two rivers, the Taf Fechan ("little Taff") and the Taf Fawr ("great Taff") before becoming one just north of Merthyr Tydfil. At Cardiff, it empties into the Bristol Channel.

The river supports several species of migratory fish, including salmon, sewins (sea trout), and eels.

== Course ==
From its confluence at Cefn-coed-y-cymmer, the river flows south, passing several towns. It picks up a few tributaries, such as the River Cynon, River Rhondda, Bargoed Taf and Nant Clydach. It flows through Pontypridd and through to Taff's Well, the site of Wales' only thermal spring. It flows underneath the M4 Motorway, before turning southeastward and flowing past the Cardiff suburbs of Radyr, Whitchurch, Llandaff, Pontcanna, the city centre and Grangetown, before emptying into Cardiff Bay, near to the mouth of the River Ely.

=== Taf Fawr ===
The Taf Fawr rises below the peak of Corn Du, south-west of Pen y Fan and soon flows in a generally southerly direction through a steep-sided valley, which was identified by Cardiff's Borough Engineer John Avery Brandon Williams as the best source of water for the town when he assessed all possible sources of water for the newly formed Cardiff Corporation Waterworks in 1881. A bill was presented to Parliament in November 1883, and despite serious opposition from riparian landowners, royal assent was obtained for the Cardiff Corporation Act 1884 on 7 August. It allowed the corporation to build three reservoirs.

The catchment of the upper Taf Fawr was 10,400 acres (42 km^{2}) but it was split into an upper area of 4,000 acres (16 km^{2}) and a lower one of 6,400 acres (26 km^{2}). Any works had to provide compensation water to maintain the flow in the Taf Fawr, and working on the upper area first meant that the corporation only had to supply 3 million imperial gallons (14 Ml) per day of compensation flow until work started on the lower area. Cantref Reservoir, the lower of the two in the upper area, was constructed first. Work began on 4 May 1886 and was completed on 14 September 1892. Construction of Beacons Reservoir, the highest in the chain, began shortly afterwards, in April 1893, in advance of the corporation obtaining a second act of Parliament to increase the capacity of the reservoir and to move the dam further upstream, where the foundations would be better, in the light of geological investigation. Impounding of the water began on 17 September 1897.

Construction of Llwyn-on Reservoir, the third in the chain, did not start until 1911, and again, its capacity was increased by the Cardiff Corporation Act 1909 (9 Edw. 7. c. clxi) to 1,260 million imperial gallons (5,700 Ml), almost double that specified in 1884. Impounding of water began on 23 June 1926, and the reservoir was full by November, but formal commissioning did not take place until May 1927. Once built, it supplied 7.75 million imperial gallons (35.2 Ml) of compensation water per day to maintain the flow in the river.

Below Llwyn-on, the river is crossed by the A470 Brecon to Merthyr road, the A465 Heads of the Valleys road, and as it passes to the south-west of Cefn-coed-y-cymmer, the Cefn Railway Viaduct. which consists of 15 arches built on a curve. It was to have been built of stone, but a masons strike in 1866 resulted in the Brecon and Merthyr Railway buying 800,000 bricks to complete it. It is grade II* listed as its history and architecture surpass that of most other railway viaducts in Wales. On the west bank are the remains of a leat, constructed in 1766 for the Cyfarthfa Ironworks. It is fed by a stone weir with a cast iron sluice. Parts of the leat are cut into solid rock, and parts have stone walls and buttresses. The river is joined by the Taf Fechan near Cyfarthfa Castle.

=== Taf Fechan ===
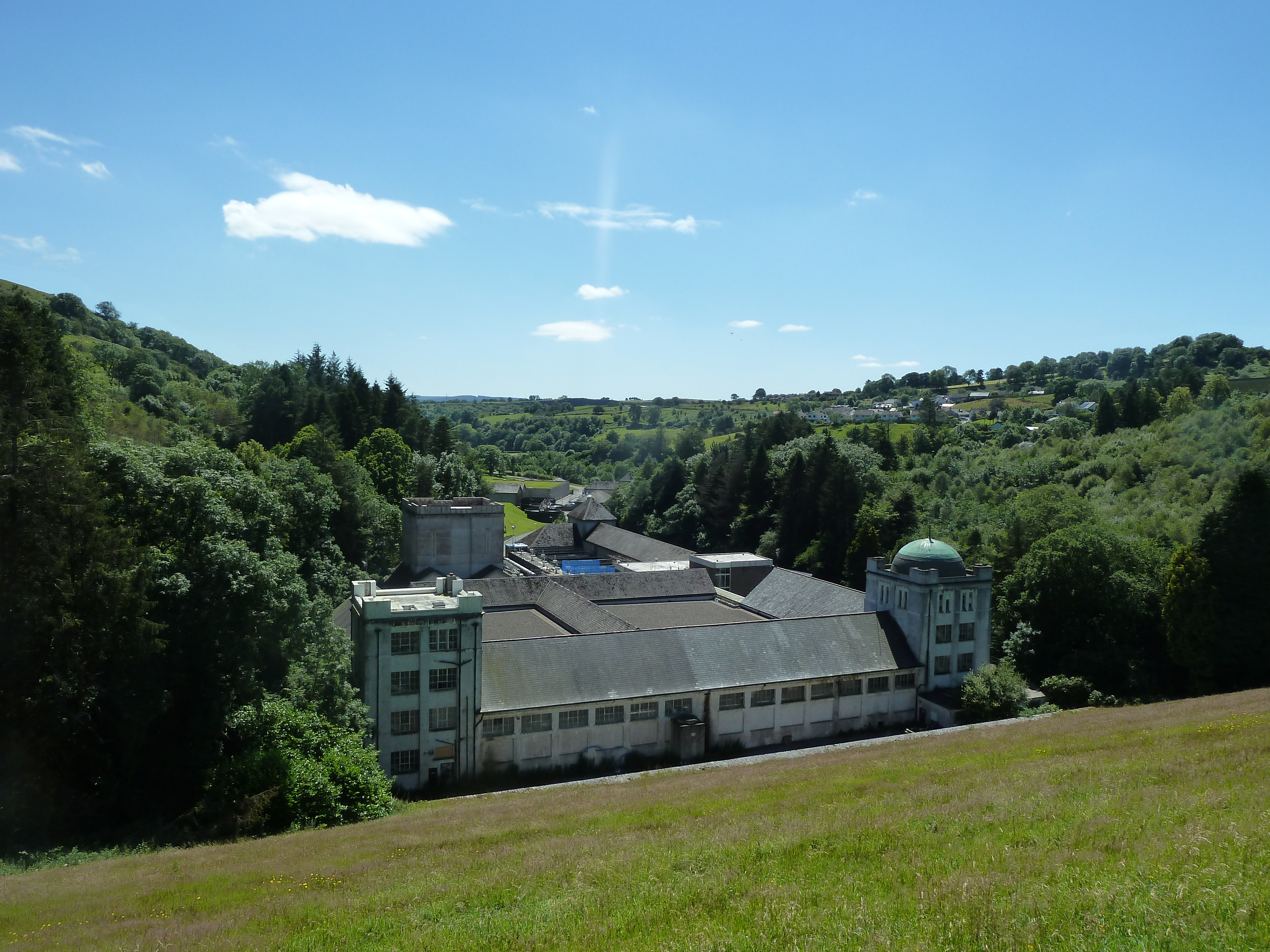
Pontsticill Water Treatment Works

The Taf Fechan rises immediately to the south of Pen y Fan and runs southwards through three reservoirs and a former fourth, now abandoned. Whereas the Taf Fawr was the preserve of Cardiff Corporation, the Taf Fechan was used to supply water to Merthyr Tydfil Corporation. Of the Upper Neuadd and Lower Neuadd reservoirs, the lower one was built first, authorised by an act of Parliament obtained in 1876. Like those on the Taf Fawr, it had an earth embankment with a clay core. The clay had to be imported, and for this purpose a private branch line was built from the Brecon and Merthyr Tydfil Junction Railway near Torpantau railway station. The contract for the work was given to William Jones of Neath, and the project was completed in 1884. Now decommissioned, the water level when the reservoir was full was at 1,413 feet (431 m) above Ordnance Datum, and it held 74 million imperial gallons (340 Ml).

The Upper Neuadd Reservoir was rather larger, and was authorised by the Merthyr Tydfil District Council Waterworks Act 1895 (58 & 59 Vict. c. clvi). The dam which is 75 feet (23 m) high was constructed of masonry, and some 100,000 tons were carried along an extended railway to the construction site. Although the contractors Holme and King of Liverpool were employed to do much of the preparatory work, the building of the dam was carried out by direct labour, with Merthyr Corporation's surveyor, Thomas F Harvey, acting as resident engineer. Work began in 1896 and finished in 1902. It held 340 million imperial gallons (1,500 Ml), and with a water level at 1,506 feet (459 m), it was one of a very small number of artificial lakes built above the 1,500-foot (457 m) contour. The dam had a small tower to the west, and a larger one to the east, below which a tunnel outlet built in Piranesi style sat at the base of the dam. Neuadd House, built as part of the reservoir project in 1896, is just downstream from the dam. An octagonal building at the east side of the Lower Neuadd dam is also a listed structure.

The river continues southwards through a steep-sided wooded valley and is crossed by Pont Cwmyfedwen, an early- to mid-19th century single span bridge before it reaches Pentwyn Reservoir, the oldest of the four reservoirs. It was built by the Merthyr Board of Health between 1859 and February 1863, and the consulting engineer for the project was Thomas Hawksley, but despite this, the dam was built over a geological fault, which led to large volumes of leakage. This leakage was one of the main factors that led to the construction of the Lower Neuadd Reservoir. Remedial work was carried out at regular intervals, but never seemed to last for long. Repairs undertaken in 1912/13 reduced the level of leakage from 11 to 2 million imperial gallons (50 to 9 Ml) which was sufficient until Pontsticill Reservoir could be built to impound the leaking water. The corporation had obtained the Merthyr Tydfil Corporation Water Act 1911 (1 & 2 Geo. 5. c. xcvii) to authorise it, and awarded a contract to Sir Robert McAlpine & Sons on 16 June 1913. The contract price of £232,000 included various ancillary work including diverting the roads on both sides of the valley. The top of the earth dam was 110 feet (34 m) above the valley floor, and the reservoir was designed to hold 3,290 million imperial gallons (15,000 Ml), although this was subsequently increased a little by raising the water level by 12 feet (3.7 m). Completion was delayed by the onset of the First World War, and when work resumed in 1922, the corporation used direct labour. The Taf Fechan Water Supply Act 1921 (11 & 12 Geo. 5. c. lxxxix) had been passed in 1921, creating the Taf Fechan Water Supply Board, uniting the Rhymney Valley Water Board, the Pontypridd and Rhondda Joint Water Board, the urban district councils of Aberdare and Llantrisant & Llantwit Fardre, and Merthyr Tydfil Corporation. The reservoir was opened by Lord Buckland of Bwlch on 21 July 1927.

The valve tower is octagonal and built in Gothic style, with a copper-covered spire. The outflow is a large funnel with convex sides and concrete ribs. Both are grade II listed, together with the dam and a lattice steel bridge. The filter house, with its twelve rapid gravity filter beds, which have been little altered since 1923, is also listed, as are the turbine house, which controlled how much water flowed over the weir, and the compensation basin below that, which is used to regulate the flow in the Taf Fechan below the reservoir. Below the works is Pont Sticill, a single span bridge with a datestone showing it was built in 1825, which gives its name to the village.

Below Pontsticill the river forms the boundary of the Brecon Beacons National Park and descends into a wooded gorge, where it is crossed by the seven-arched Pontsarn Viaduct built for the Brecon and Merthyr Railway in 1866. It is 92 feet (28 m) high and 420 feet (128 m) long. Just to the south of the viaduct is Pont-sarn, a stone bridge built in 1864 after the previous wooden one collapsed. This occurred because the parishes of Merthyr and Vaynor were supposed to maintain it jointly, but could not agree, and so it became dilapidated. There were proposals to widen it in 1955, but the plans were withdrawn when there was stiff opposition from local people. Below the bridge, the river plunges into Pwll Glas or the Blue Pool. The river continues to flow south-westwards around the hamlet of Trefechan, and as it approaches Cefn-coed-y-cymmer, there is a tramway and leat on the east bank. The tramway was built in 1792, and was used to carry limestone to the Cyfarthfa Ironworks from Gurnos quarries, while the leat was constructed in 1825. Its main function was to provide the ironworks with a good supply of water, but it also fed the ornamental lake at Cyfarthfa Castle through a syphon. After passing under the A465 and the A4054 roads, the Taf Fechan merges with the Taf Fawr at the wooded confluence that gives Cefn-coed-y-cymmer its name.

The river holds a large population of wild brown trout, many of which were killed in 2006 when three tonnes of aluminium sulphate spilled into the river from the Pontsticill Water Treatment Works, which United Utilities operate on behalf of Dwr Cymru Welsh Water. The pollution turned the water white for at least 3 miles (5 km) downstream of the works and killed approximately 23,000 fish, including wild brown trout, bullheads, stickleback and pike, and a large number of invertebrates. Environment Agency Wales estimated that the river would take six to twelve years to recover. The trout population had resumed breeding by 2009.

=== Below the confluence ===
Just below the confluence of the Taf Fawr and Taf Fechan, the river is crossed by the Pont-y-Cafnau tramroad bridge. This was probably the first iron railway bridge to be built, and was unusual in that it had three levels. The main deck carried the 4 ft (1,219 mm)-gauge Gurnos Tramway, beneath which there was an iron trough to carry water from the Taf Fechan leat, while a second water supply was carried in a wooden launder above the tramway tracks. The cast iron structure was manufactured at the Cyfarthfa Ironworks. On the west bank of the river are the remains of the ironworks, which began operating in 1765. The artifacts include seven blast furnaces, which formed part of the largest ironworks in the world in its heyday. The river runs through the western edges of Merthyr Tydfil, where it is crossed by modern bridges carrying the A4054 and A4102 roads, and by Jackson's Bridge, an early 19th century single span structure that carried the Dowlais tramway and a road.

Two modern bridges in central Merthyr Tydfil carry the northbound carriageway of the A4054 across the river to its west bank and back again, with a weir between them. Nant Rhyd-y-car joins on the west bank at Cae-draw, just before the A4102 crosses. As it approaches Abercanaid Industrial Estate, the railway from Merthyr Tydfil railway station joins the east bank of the river and runs parallel to it for much of its length. It curves around the eastern edge of Abercanaid, below which it is crossed by the A4060 road bridge. At Troed-y-rhiw the B4285 Bridge Street crosses, and the Afon Tâf High School if located on the east bank. A little further south, Ynysowen Community Primary School is on the west bank and the river curves around the eastern edge of Aberfan, part of the Merthyr Vale community. Below Aberfan, the river enters a wooded section, and the remains of the Merthyr Tramroad are sandwiched between the river and the modern railway. The Merthyr or Penydarren Tramroad was built in 1793, and was the scene of the first passenger carrying train journey in the world, when Richard Trevithick's high pressure steam locomotive pulled wagons containing 5 tons of iron ore and seventy passengers in 1804. The tramway ceased operation around 1880, and this section, which is a scheduled monument, is particularly well preserved.

The river is crossed by an old farm access bridge at Pont y Gwaith, with a single span of 55 feet (16.8 m) and a width of 14 feet (4.3 m). It carries a date plaque stating it was built in 1811, but that probably refers to an earlier wooden bridge, and the main arch was rebuilt in 1993. The river turns to the east to flow around the southern edge of Treharris, and then in a large loop around higher ground on which is Goitre-Coed. Three listed bridges cross the loop. The first was built by Isambard Kingdom Brunel in 1840–41, and consists of six arches on a slight curve. It carried the single track Taff Vale Railway, but was doubled in width within 20 years, to enable it to carry twin tracks. The second was part of the Merthyr Tramroad, and was built in 1815 after the original wooden bridge collapsed into the river when a train crossed it. It has a span of 63 feet (19.2 m) and is one of the earliest railway bridges, but was in poor condition in 2002, as is the Victoria Bridge, which was also rebuilt in 1815.

Continuing to the south-west, the river is crossed by the A472 and A470 roads, and at Abercynon is crossed by the B4275 road. Immediately to the south of the bridge was an aqueduct carrying the defunct Glamorganshire Canal over the river. The Afon Cynon joins on the right bank, and close to the junction is spanned by a skewed railway bridge with two arches of unequal sizes. The valley then widens, and the river begins to meander. On the northern edge of Glyncoch, the river is joined by the Nant Clydach on its right bank, and to the south of the settlement is crossed by a three-bay girder viaduct, built in 1885 to carry a branch of the Taff Vale Railway over the river to Albion Colliery at Cilfynydd. Just to the south is White or Berw Bridge, designed by Pontypridd Urban District Council's surveyor, P. R. A. Willoughby. It was built in 1907, aided by L G Mouchel & Partners, who pioneered the use of reinforced concrete, and the 115-foot (35 m) span over the river was the longest arch in Britain using this material when it was constructed. The next crossing is Pontypridd Bridge, a high-arched single span of 140 feet (43 m). It was built in 1756 by an Independent minister and self-taught civil engineer called William Edwards, and was his third attempt, after his two earlier bridges collapsed. It features three round openings in its spandrels, a device he used to relieve the pressure on an unusually wide arch. It was repaired by Edward David and Thomas Evan in 1798, and is attached to the newer Victoria Bridge on its south side.

On the east bank is Ynysangharad Park, where there is an Arts and Crafts lido, designed in the 1920s and opened in 1923. It is now disused, but is grade II listed, as it is one of the earliest outdoor lidos in South Wales. On the west bank, the river is joined by the Afon Rhondda, before it sweeps to the east in a large bend. The A4058 dual carriageway crosses the bend at an angle, and as the river resumes its southward course, it is crossed by Machine Bridge, which is also known as Pont y Doctor, as it was built by Dr Richard Griffiths in 1809, as part of a tramway to carry coal from the Hafod Uchaf pit to the Glamorganshire Canal. It has three arches, and was widened around 1910, in an early use of reinforced concrete. Some of the 19th century fabric remains, and is thought to be the earliest multi-span railway bridge still in existence in the world. Two more modern road bridges are located on its south side, and further downstream is Castle Bridge, a narrow structure with three arches dating from the early 19th century. It formerly carried a road, but is now only used by pedestrians. Next there is a large, crescent-shaped weir, which was built in 1834–5 to provide water power to the Treforest tinplate works. The sluice to control the flow of water to the works is at the western end of the weir, and probably dates from a little later. The works continued in operation until 1939, and a fish ladder was added in 2003, to allow migrating fish to access the upper river. Many of the building still exist, some distance to the south of the weir, including a casting house, a workshop, a tinning house, a smithy, a rolling mill, and the retaining wall for the leat. The leat had seven sluices with gates to feed the works, but all have been bricked up.

=== Diversion in Cardiff ===
In the early 1840s the South Wales Railway was trying to find a suitable site for a railway station, but the area that is now Cardiff Central railway station was prone to flooding. At this point the main route of the Taff was around Cardiff Castle and down what is now Westgate Street, with the lands where Cardiff Arms Park and the Millennium Stadium are now sited tidal flats which were prone to flood.

Isambard Kingdom Brunel's solution was to divert the Taff to the west, creating a larger and safer site for the station. The station was opened by the South Wales Railway in 1850.

== Tributaries ==
=== Nant Ffrwd ===
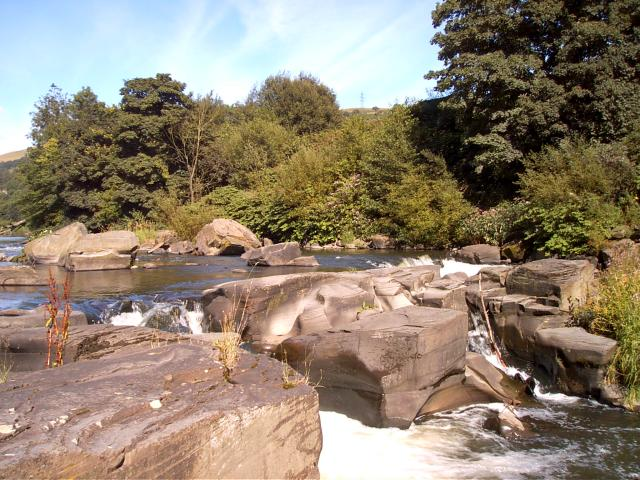
Waterfall on the Taff near Pontypridd

Underneath the Cefn Coed Viaduct, the Nant Ffrwd, a tributary that runs eastward in a deep wooded gorge before flowing into the Taf Fawr above the confluence with the Taf Fechan, emerges into the river from a deep, narrow gorge.

=== Nant Morlais and Nant Rhydycar ===
The Taff continues south through the centre of Merthyr Tydfil, where it is joined by the Nant Morlais which emerges at Abermorlais from a culvert in the east bank. Just south of Merthyr weir, the Nant Rhydycar joins.

=== Taff Bargoed, Cynon, Nant Clydach and Rhondda ===
South of Merthyr, the Taff begins to meander its way between Pentrebach and Abercanaid and through Troed-y-rhiw, Merthyr Vale and Aberfan towards Quakers Yard. Here, the Taff Bargoed, Nant Mafon and then down into Abercynon in the Cynon Valley where the Afon Cynon merges with the Taff and, slightly further downstream the Nant Clydach joins. At Pontypridd it is joined by the Afon Rhondda. From Pontypridd, it runs roughly south before arriving at the northern boundary of the city of Cardiff.

== Mouth of the Taff ==
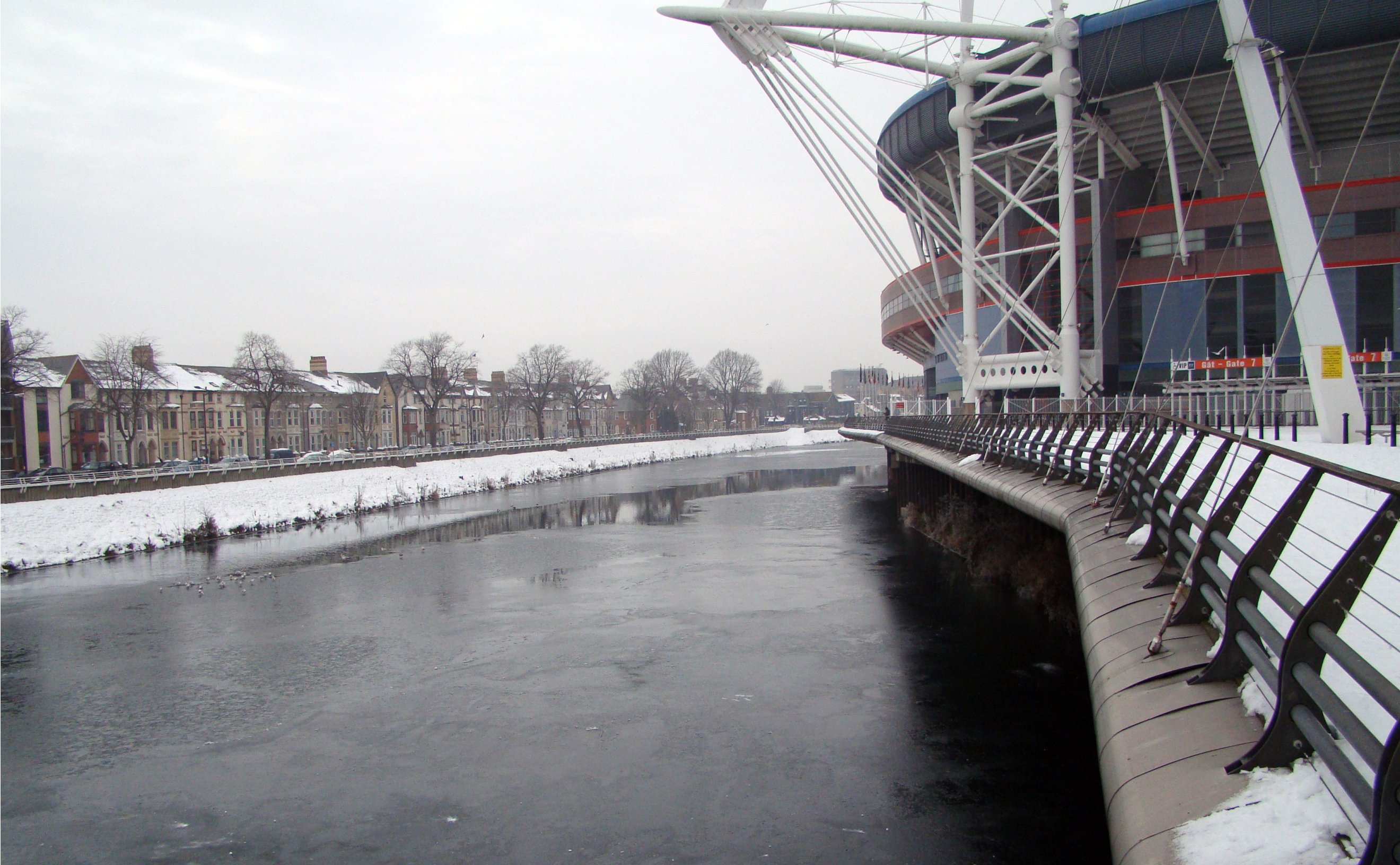
Frozen river at the Millennium Stadium (2010)

In Cardiff, the natural course of the river was changed during the 19th century; from Cardiff Castle it now follows an artificial riverbed west of where it previously flowed, following a path through Bute Park, past the Cardiff Arms Park and the Principality Stadium. The Taff flows into Cardiff Bay, an artificial lake created by the construction of the Cardiff Bay Barrage in the 1990s, before flowing into the Severn Estuary.

== See also ==
- Pont-y-Cafnau, world's earliest surviving iron railway bridge
- Cardiff Rivers Group

== Bibliography ==
- Bowtell, Harold D; Hill, Geoffrey (2006). Reservoir Builders of South Wales. Industrial Railway Society. ISBN 978-0-9540726-2-9.
- Wheatley, Joseph Larke (1905). History of the Cardiff Corporation Waterworks Undertaking. Cardiff Records: Volume 5. British History Online.
