= Merthyr Tramroad =

Early Welsh railway line

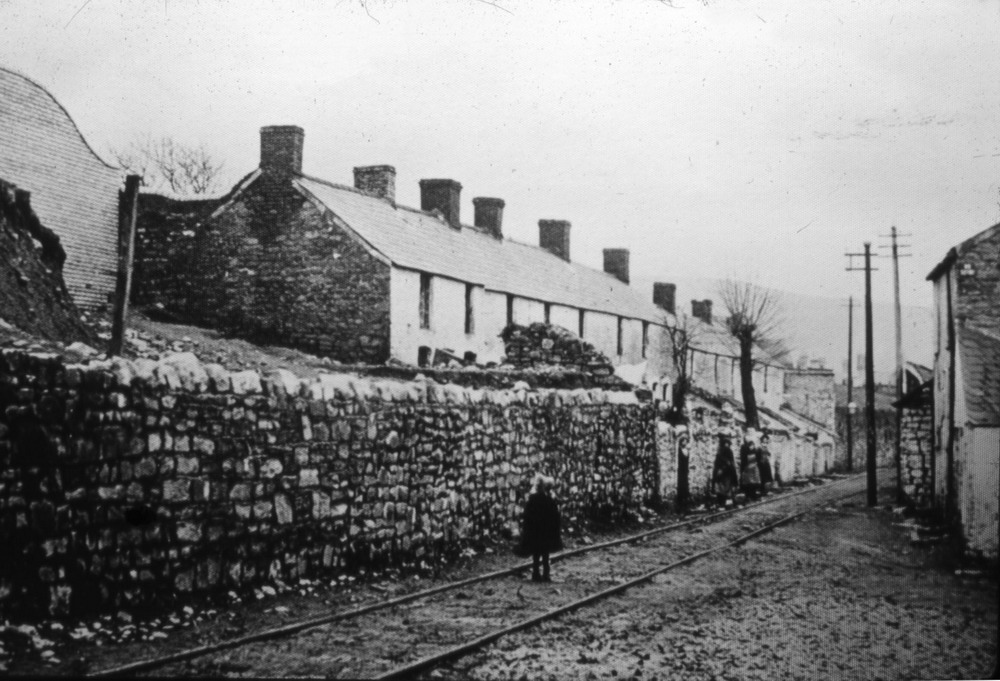
- The Merthyr Tramroad, around 1910

Overview
- Other name: Penydarren Tramroad
- Status: Ceased operation

Service
- Type: Single-track plateway
- Rolling stock: Wood strapped with iron

History
- Commenced: 1800
- Completed: 1802
- Closed: After 1851

Technical
- Line length: 9.75 mi (15.69 km)
- Track gauge: 4 ft 4 in (1,321 mm)

The Merthyr Tramroad (sometimes referred to as the Penydarren Tramroad due to its use by Trevithick's locomotive, built at the ironworks) was a 9 3/4-mile-long (15.7 km) line that opened in 1802, connecting the private lines belonging to the Dowlais and Penydarren Ironworks with the Glamorganshire Canal at Abercynon, also serving the Plymouth Ironworks along the way. It is famous as the line, on which Richard Trevithick's experimental locomotive hauled the first train to carry a load (of 10 long tons (11 short tons; 10 t) of iron). It was largely superseded when the Taff Vale Railway opened in 1841, and sections gradually went out of use over two decades, from about 1851.

== History ==
The four principal ironworks at Merthyr Tydfil were Dowlais (built 1759), Plymouth (built 1763), Cyfarthfa (built 1765) and Penydarren (built 1784). Initially the output of these ironworks was carried by packhorse or on carts 25 miles (40.2 km) to Cardiff. In 1794, Cyfarthfa works was linked to Cardiff by the Glamorganshire Canal, the other three ironworks were linked to it by tramways. Richard Crawshay of Cyfarthfa Ironworks held the controlling interest in the canal company and claimed preferential treatment. The upper heavily locked section of the canal suffered from congestion.

A bill for a tramroad from Merthyr to Cardiff was defeated in Parliament in 1799, by opposition from the Glamorganshire Canal proprietors but the upper section of the proposed line was built anyway, compulsory powers were provided for by provisions in the Glamorganshire Canal Act 1790 (30 Geo. 3. c. 82) but were not invoked.

The engineer was George Overton and construction began in 1800, under the supervision of Richard Hill of the Plymouth Ironworks. It was completed in 1802.

The Dowlais company already had edge rail lines of narrower gauge from their works to near the head of the canal at Merthyr and these were converted to 4 ft 4 in (1,321 mm) gauge plateways to connect with this new line allowing through running.

In 1804, Trevithick's pioneering steam locomotive made a few experimental runs along this line.

In 1815, a wooden bridge over the Taff near Quakers Yard collapsed beneath a train carrying iron from Penydarren. The whole train including the horses, the haulier and four other people riding on it fell into the river killing one horse, badly cutting another and injuring two of the people.

In 1823, a bill was unsuccessfully promoted to extend the line to Cardiff. It was some of the same promoters who obtained the Taff Vale Railway Act 1836. Although the Taff Vale Railway opened to Merthyr in 1841 it was not until 1851 that the standard gauge Dowlais Railway was completed allowing through running to its works. Penydarren Ironworks closed in 1859. Plymouth Works did not cease iron production until 1880 but had built a standard gauge line over part of the tramroad in 1871. South of Mount Pleasant the disused tramroad was lifted in about 1890.

Only a single photograph of the tramroad has survived, taken in 1862 and showing widening of the Quaker's Yard viaduct.

== Construction ==
The line was a single-track plateway with a gauge of 4 ft 4 in (1,321 mm) over the flanges of the L-shaped cast-iron plate rails (or 4 ft 2 in (1,270 mm) between the inside of the flanges). The plates were 3 feet (910 mm) long weighing 56 pounds (25.4 kg) each and were spiked to rough stone blocks about 18 inches (460 mm) square. There were frequent passing loops, at Plymouth Ironworks the line ran through a tunnel only 8 feet (2.4 m) high beneath the charging area of the blast furnaces. The average gradient from Merthyr to Abercynon was 1 in 145 (6.9‰). Near Quakers Yard two timber bridges carried the line over the River Taff where it runs through a gorge in a large loop. After the collapse of one of these bridges beneath a train in 1815 they were both replaced by brick arches.

Later on chairs were introduced into which the plate rails were keyed.

== Operation ==
Initially one horse pulled about five trams, making one return journey a day. Later trains of about 25 trams hauled by three horses became normal. The owners of the line did allow other people to use it on payment of a toll but it is not known if anyone did. Regular locomotive working began in 1832.

== Rolling stock ==
The wagons (or trams) were about 7 feet 6 inches (2.3 m) long by 4 feet 9 inches (1.4 m) wide at the top, made of wood strapped with iron and carried on cast iron wheels 2 feet 6 inches to 2 feet 9 inches (760 to 840 mm) diameter. They weighed about 15 long cwt (1,700 lb or 800 kg) and carried at least two long tons (2.2 short tons; 2.0 t). There were 250 of them by 1830.

== Locomotives ==
Trevithick's locomotive built at Penydarren in 1804 made several runs after its famous initial run. On one occasion it was successfully tried hauling 25 long tons (28 short tons; 25 t). It weighed about 5 long tons (5.6 short tons; 5.1 t) and broke many of the cast iron plate rails.

In 1829, Stephenson supplied a six-wheeled locomotive with inclined cylinders mounted at the rear for use on the narrower gauge internal lines at Penydarren, it cost £375. In 1832 it was returned to Stephensons for conversion to a four-wheeled locomotive for use on the Merthyr Tramroad and at the same time the single flue was replaced by 82 copper fire tubes. It was at this time given the name "Eclipse" and commenced work on the Merthyr Tramroad on 22 June 1832. The chimney must have been hinged to allow it to go through the Plymouth tunnel.

The Dowlais Company's line linking their works to the Merthyr Tramroad had a maximum gradient of 1 in 16.5 (60.6‰) and considered too steep for locomotives to work by adhesion alone. In 1832 the Neath Abbey Ironworks supplied a six-wheeled rack and adhesion locomotive weighing 8 long tons (9.0 short tons; 8.1 t) named "Perseverance" with inclined cylinders and twin chimneys (allowing them to be lowered alongside the boiler to pass through the tunnel at Plymouth).

Another somewhat similar locomotive (but without a geared rack drive) named "Mountaineer" was built in 1833 by the Neath Abbey Co. for the Dowlais Company. As the drawings included a cross section of the Plymouth tunnel and it had a hinged chimney it was presumably intended to be used on the Merthyr Tramroad (unlike a second smaller locomotive built in 1832 which had a fixed chimney).

The 0-6-0 "Dowlais" built by Neath Abbey in 1836 had the inclined cylinders mounted at the front (unlike the previous locomotives which had rear mounted cylinders) and rack drive for use on the incline to Dowlais.

"Charles Jordan" delivered from Neath Abbey in 1838 was an adhesion only locomotive very similar to "Mountaineer".

The last record of spare parts being supplied to Dowlais for these locomotives was in 1840-1841. An 1848 inventory of Dowlais plant lists only "Mountaineer" of the above locomotives. No plateway locomotives were listed in 1856.

The locomotives had a maximum 3 long tons (3.4 short tons; 3.0 t) axle load and plate layers were carried on the trains to replace broken plates. On 1 April, 1839, more than 4,000 plates were required to make the tramway good though little more than half that number had been supplied by the three ironworks. By 22 June that year 1,600 more plates were broken, of which the Dowlais engines were blamed for smashing 1,450. By July the tramroad was reported to be almost impassable, for two days being blocked by a derailed Dowlais locomotive and Anthony Hill of Plymouth unsuccessfully applied to the Trustees for the locomotives to be banned.
