= South Wales Valleys =

Group of industrialised peri-urban valleys in South Wales

Coordinates: 51.773°N 3.345°W

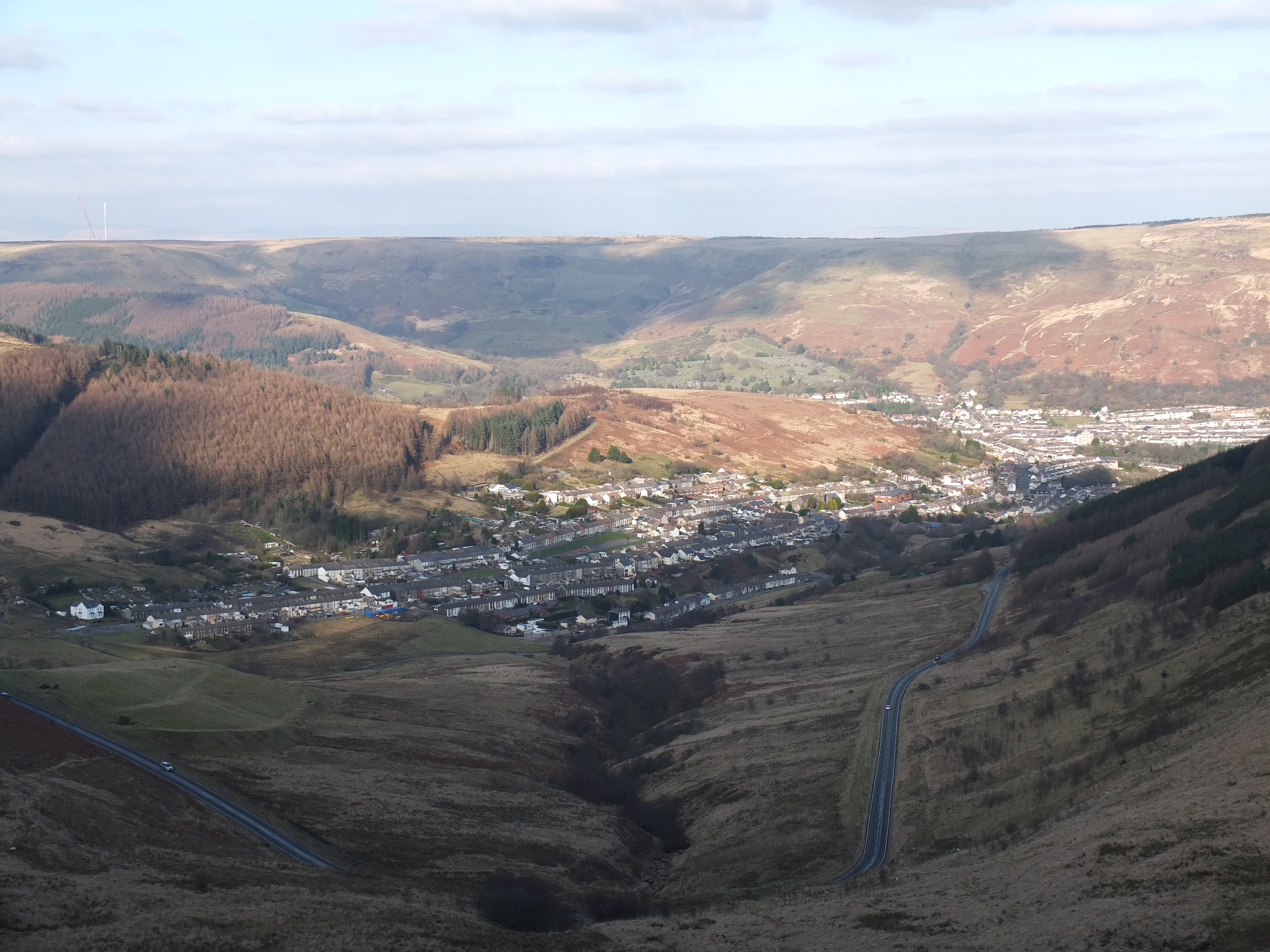
Cwmparc, near the head of the Rhondda Fawr, typical scenery

A short video about the Valleys Regional Park, by Natural Resources Wales

The South Wales Valleys (Welsh: Cymoedd De Cymru) are a group of industrialised peri-urban valleys in South Wales. Most of the valleys run north–south, roughly parallel to each other. Commonly referred to as "The Valleys" (Welsh: Y Cymoedd), they stretch from Carmarthenshire in the west to Monmouthshire in the east; to the edge of the pastoral country of the Vale of Glamorgan and the coastal plain near the cities of Swansea, Cardiff, and Newport.

== History ==
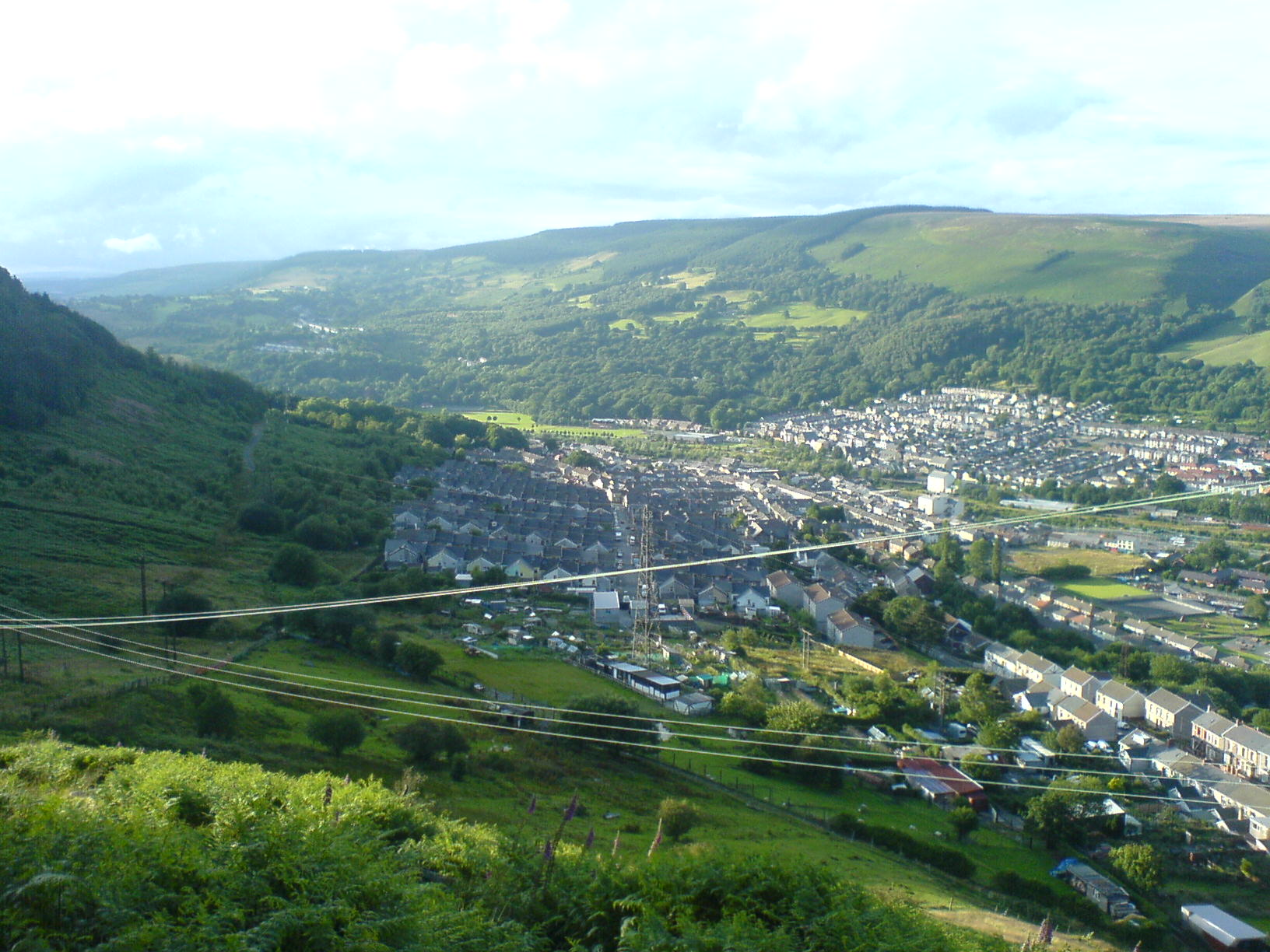
View of the Cynon Valley from Penrhiwceiber, Rhondda Cynon Taf

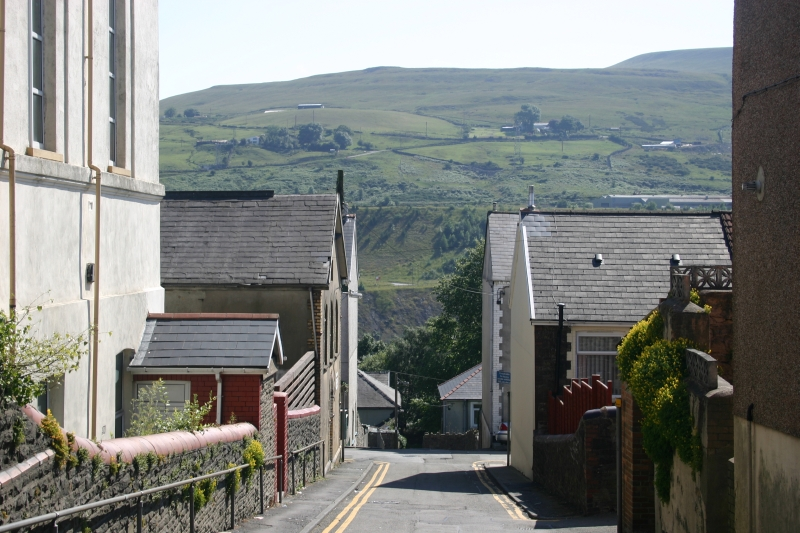
Ebbw Valley viewed from Ebbw Vale

Until the mid-19th century, the South Wales valleys were sparsely inhabited. The industrialisation of the Valleys occurred in two phases. First, in the second half of the 18th century, the iron industry was established on the northern edge of the Valleys, mainly by English entrepreneurs. This made South Wales the most important part of Britain for ironmaking until the middle of the 19th century. Second, from 1850 until the outbreak of the First World War, the South Wales Coalfield was developed to supply steam coal and anthracite.

The South Wales Valleys contained Britain's only mountainous coalfields. Topography defined the shape of the mining communities, with a "hand and fingers" pattern of urban development. There were fewer than 1,000 people in the Rhondda valley in 1851, 17,000 by 1870, 114,000 by 1901 and 153,000 by 1911; but the wider impact of urbanisation was constrained by geography—the Rhondda remained a collection of villages rather than a town. The population of the Valleys in the late 19th and early 20th centuries was disproportionately young and male; many of them were migrants drawn from other parts of Wales or from further afield. The new communities had extremely high birth rates—in 1840, more than 20 per cent of Tredegar's population was aged under seven, and Rhondda's birth rate in 1911 was 36 per thousand, levels usually associated with mid-19th century Britain.

Merthyr Tydfil, at the northern end of the Taff valley, became Wales's largest town thanks to its growing ironworks at Dowlais and Cyfarthfa. The neighbouring Taff Bargoed Valley to the east became the centre of serious industrial and political strife during the 1930s, especially in and around the villages of Trelewis and Bedlinog, which served the local collieries of Deep Navigation and Taff Merthyr. The South Wales coalfield attracted huge numbers of people from rural areas to the valleys; and many rows of terraced housing were built along the valley sides to accommodate the influx. The coal mined in the valleys was transported south along railways and canals to Cardiff, Barry, Newport and Swansea. Cardiff was soon among the most important coal ports in the world, and Swansea among the most important steel ports.

== Decline and Regeneration ==
The coal mining industry of the Valleys was buoyed throughout World War II, though there were expectations of a return to the pre-1939 industrial collapse after the end of the war. There was a sense of salvation when the government announced the nationalisation of British coalmines in 1947; but the following decades saw a continual reduction in the output from the Welsh mines. The decline in the mining of coal after World War II was a country-wide issue, but South Wales was more severely affected than other areas of Britain. Oil had superseded coal as the fuel of choice in many industries, and there was political pressure influencing the supply of oil. In the few industries that still relied on coal, the demand was for quality coals, especially coking coal, which was required by the steel industry. Fifty percent of Glamorgan coal was now supplied to steelworks, with the second biggest market being domestic heating, in which the "smokeless" coal of the southern Wales coalfield again became fashionable after the Clean Air Act of 1956 was passed. These two markets now controlled the fate of the mines in Wales, and as demand from both sectors fell, the mining industry contracted further. In addition, exports to other areas of Europe, traditionally France, Italy and the Low Countries, experienced a massive decline: from 33% around 1900 to roughly 5% by 1980.

The other major factor in the decline of coal was the massive under-investment in Welsh mines over the past decades. Most of the mines in the valleys were sunk between the 1850s and 1880s, so they were far smaller than most modern mines. The Welsh mines were comparatively antiquated, with methods of ventilation, coal-preparation and power supply all of a decades-earlier standard. In 1945 the British coal industry as a whole cut 72% of its output mechanically, whereas in the south of Wales the figure was just 22%. The only way to ensure the financial survival of the mines in the valleys was massive investment from the National Coal Board, but the "Plan for Coal" drawn up in 1950 was overly optimistic about the future demand for coal, which was drastically reduced following an industrial recession in 1956 and an increased availability of oil. From 15,000 miners in 1947, Rhondda had just a single pit within the valleys producing coal in 1984, located at Maerdy.

In 1966, the village of Aberfan in the Taff valley suffered one of the worst disasters in Welsh history, referred to today as the Aberfan disaster. A mine waste tip on the top of the mountain, which had been developed over a spring, slid down the valley side and destroyed the village junior school, killing 144 people, 116 of them children.

In 1979, Margaret Thatcher became Prime Minister of the United Kingdom. Her policies of free market economics soon clashed with the loss-making, government-owned National Coal Board. In 1984 and 1985, after the government announced plans to close many mines across the UK, mineworkers went on strike. This strike, and its ultimate failure, led to the virtual destruction of the UK's coal industry over the next decade, although arguably costs of extraction and geological difficulties would have had the same result, perhaps a little later. No deep coal mines are left in the valleys since the closure in 2008 of Tower Colliery in the Cynon Valley. Tower had been bought by the workers in 1994, despite government attempts to close it.

By 2002, the unemployment rates in the Welsh valleys were among the highest in the whole United Kingdom since the 1980s, and have been seen as a major factor in the rise in drug abuse in the local area, which was highlighted in the national media during the autumn of 2002 and largely linked to drug dealing gangs from Birmingham and Bristol.

The Welsh Development Agency was established in 1975 and there was further regeneration from 1988 under the "Valleys Initiative" including clearing derelict land, building new housing, holding the 1992 Ebbw Vale Garden Festival and upgrading the Heads of the Valleys Road to improve connectivity.

More recently, employment levels have risen significantly in the area, outperforming the rest of Wales in 2017. This has been driven by billions of pounds of investment into the valleys from EU structural funds, UK government and Welsh government. Significant further investments in the area are also planned to go ahead.

== Present day ==
The Valleys are home to around 30% of the Welsh population, although this is declining slowly because of emigration, especially from the Upper Valleys. The area has a relatively high proportion of residents (over 90% in Blaenau Gwent and Merthyr Tydfil) born in Wales.

The Valleys have the highest percentage of Welsh identifying population in all of Wales. Merthyr Tydfil reported the highest rate of Welsh identifying, with 70.0%. They also had the highest rates of reporting themselves to have 'No religion'. The Valleys as a whole do suffer from a number of socio-economic problems however. A high proportion of people report a limiting long-term health problem, especially in the Upper Valleys. In 2006, only 64% of the working age population in the Heads of the Valleys was in employment compared with 69% in the Lower Valleys and 71% across Wales as a whole.

A relatively large number of local people are employed in manufacturing, health and social services. Fewer work in managerial or professional occupations, and more in elementary occupations, compared to the rest of the country. A large number of people commute to Cardiff, particularly in Caerphilly, Torfaen and Rhondda Cynon Taf. Though the rail network into Cardiff is extensive, train times and frequencies beyond Caerphilly and Pontypridd impede the development of a significant commuter market to city centre jobs.

Although the housing stock is not of significantly worse quality than elsewhere in Wales, there is a lack of variety in terms of private dwellings. Many homes are low-priced, older and terraced, concentrated in the lowest Council Tax bands; few are higher-priced detached homes. A report for the Welsh Government concluded that the Valleys is "a distressed area unique in Great Britain for the depth and concentration of its problems". However, the area does benefit from a local landscape described as "stunning", improving road links such as the upgraded A465, and public investment in regeneration initiatives.

Following devolution in the late 2000s, powers over the Wales and Borders rail franchise are now held by the Welsh Government. As a result, financing has been advanced through the Cardiff City Deal for a South Wales Metro. The metro will consist of route electrification, new Construcciones y Auxiliar de Ferrocarriles trains manufactured at Llanwern for use in 2023, new stations, more frequent services, and faster journey times across most valleys. The first major improvement is the re-opening of services between Ebbw Vale and Newport (via the Gaer Tunnel), which was completed in December 2023.

=== Culture ===
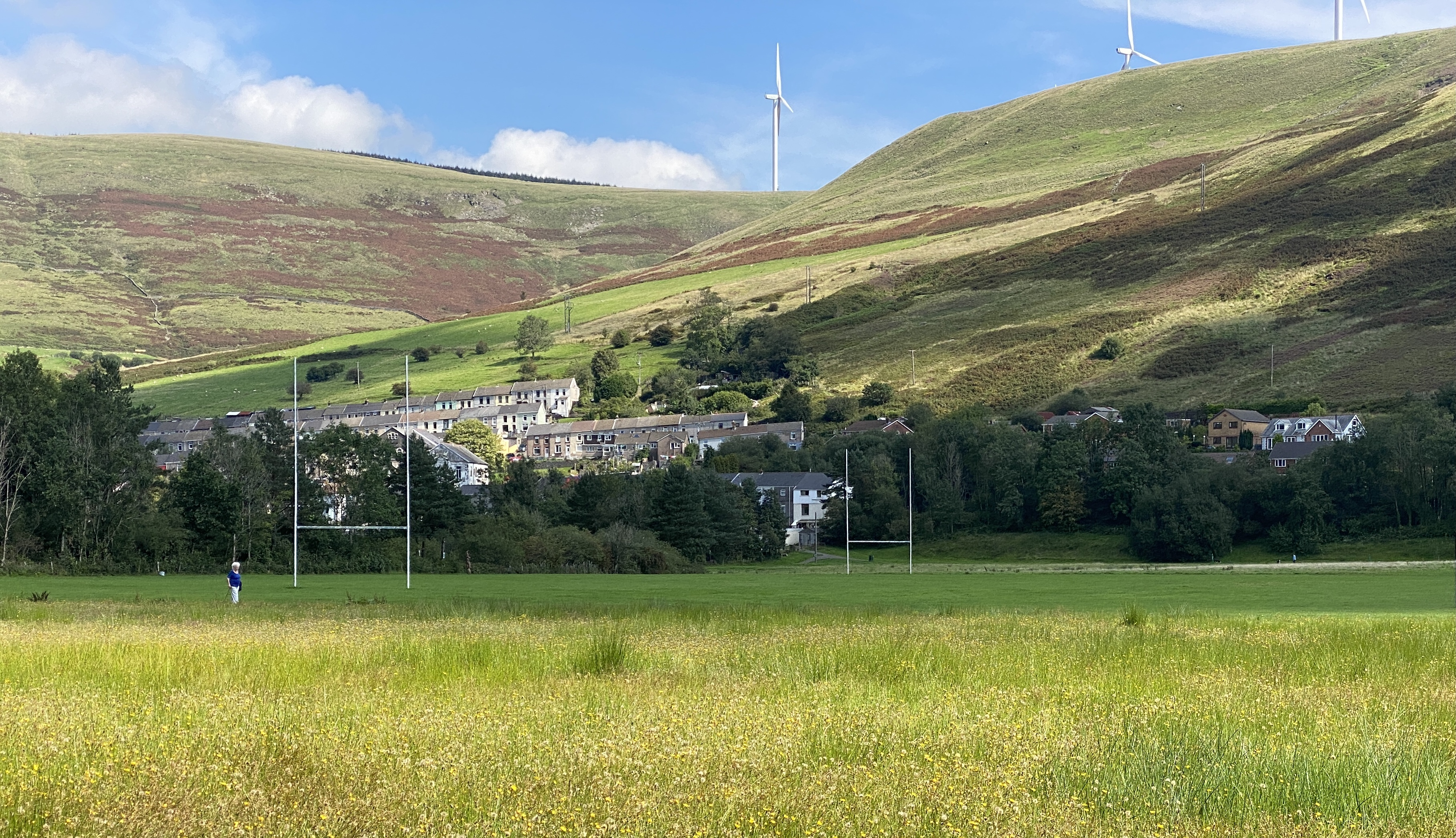
Rugby pitches are a typical feature of the valleys landscapes

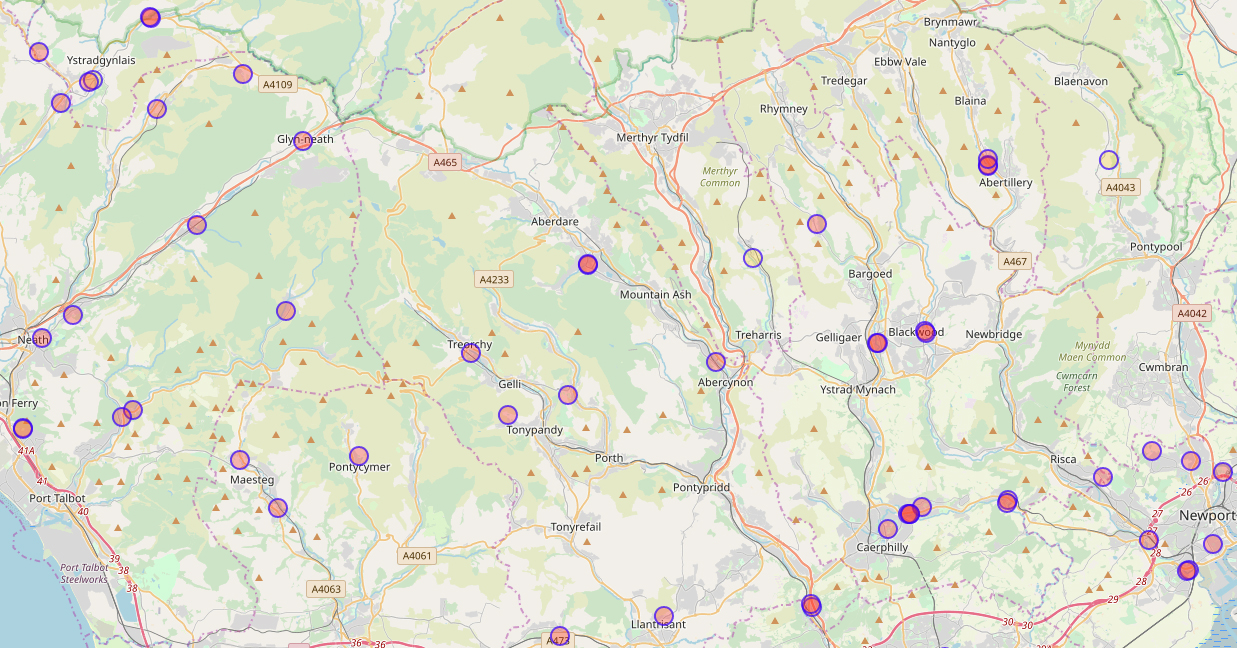
Rugby fields marked on a map of the South Wales valleys

The South Wales Valleys contain a large proportion of the Welsh population and remain an important centre of Welsh culture, despite the growing economic dominance of Cardiff. The UK Parliament's first Labour Party MP, Keir Hardie, was elected from the area, and the Valleys remain a stronghold of Labour Party power. Rugby union is very popular, and pitches can be seen along the valley corridors. "The valleys in representational terms have become a synecdoche for Wales"

The geographical shape of the valleys has its effect on culture. Roads stretch along valleys and connect the different settlements in the valley, whereas neighbouring valleys are separated by hills and mountains. Consequently, the towns in a valley are more closely associated with each other than they are with towns in the neighbouring valley, even when the towns in the neighbouring valley are closer on the map.

== Roads ==
The A470 from Cardiff is, as far as its junction with the A465 Heads of the Valleys road, a dual-carriageway providing direct access to Taff's Well, Pontypridd, Abercynon and Merthyr Tydfil. It links with the A4059 from Abercynon, Aberdare and Hirwaun; the A472 from Ystrad Mynach and Pontypool, and the A4054 from Quakers Yard.

A465 upgrade sections are
Section	From / To	Commencement date	Completion date	Status
1	Abergavenny to Gilwern	February 2005	May 2008	Complete
2	Gilwern to Brynmawr	December 2014	December 2021	Complete
3	Brynmawr to Tredegar	January 2013	September 2015	Complete
4	Tredegar to Dowlais Top	March 2002	November 2004	Complete
5	Dowlais Top to A470	Early 2021	Due by mid-2025	Under construction
6	A470 Junction to Hirwaun	Early 2021	Due by mid-2025	Under construction

== Public transport ==
Stagecoach in South Wales provides bus services linking many towns and villages directly to Cardiff city centre.

The Valley Lines network and surrounding routes

Many settlements in the Valleys are served by the Valley Lines network, an urban rail network radiating from Cardiff which links them to the city's stations, principally Cardiff Queen Street and Cardiff Central, with connections onto the South Wales Main Line. There are six main lines from Central Cardiff to the Valleys:

- Valley Lines via Cardiff Queen Street
  - Rhondda Line to Pontypridd to Treherbert
  - Merthyr Line to Pontypridd and Abercynon continuing to either Aberdare or Merthyr Tydfil, plus the freight-only section beyond Aberdare to Hirwaun
  - Rhymney Line to Rhymney, plus the freight-only line from Ystrad Mynach to Cwmbargoed.
- Routes via the South Wales Main Line
  - Maesteg Line to Bridgend and Maesteg
  - Ebbw Valley Railway to Ebbw Vale
  - Welsh Marches Line to Abergavenny continuing into the English West Midlands, and to either North Wales or North West England

== Valleys listed from west to east ==
- Gwendraeth valley
- Loughor Valley
- Amman Valley
- Swansea Valley (Tawe Valley)
- Dulais Valley
- Vale of Neath
- Afan Valley
- Llynfi Valley
- Garw Valley
- Ogmore Valley
- Rhondda Valley
- Cynon Valley
- Ely Valley
- Taff Valley
- Taff Bargoed Valley
- Aber Valley
- Rhymney Valley (forms the historic boundary between Glamorgan and Monmouthshire)
- Sirhowy Valley
- Ebbw Valley
- Ebbw Fach Valley
- Llwyd Valley

== Bibliography ==
- John, Arthur H. (1980). Glamorgan County History, Volume V, Industrial Glamorgan from 1700 to 1970. Cardiff: University of Wales Press.
