= Jimmy Wilde =

Welsh boxer (1892–1969)

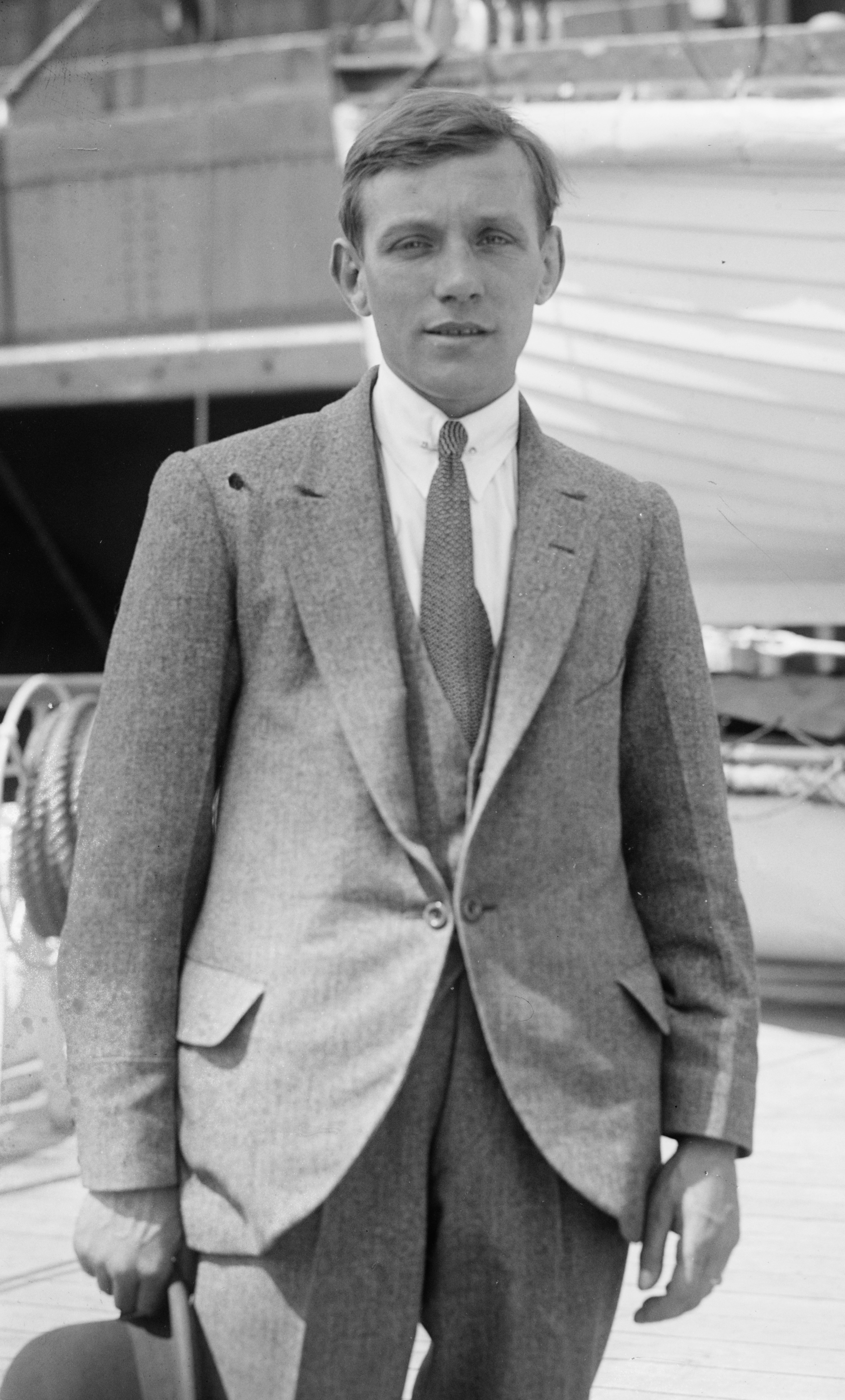

Personal information
- Nicknames: The Mighty Atom; The Tylorstown Terror; Ghost with the Hammer in his Hand
- Nationality: Welsh
- Born: William James Wilde; 15 May 1892 Quakers Yard, Merthyr Tydfil, Wales
- Died: 10 March 1969 (aged 76) Whitchurch, Cardiff, Wales
- Height: 5 ft 2 in (1.57 m)
- Weight: Flyweight

Boxing career
- Reach: 66 in (168 cm)
- Stance: Orthodox

Boxing record
- Total fights: 150
- Wins: 137
- Win by KO: 98
- Losses: 4
- Draws: 1
- No contests: 8

William James Wilde (12 May 1892 – 10 March 1969) was a Welsh professional boxer who competed from 1911 to 1923. He simultaneously held the National Sporting Clubs British flyweight title and the World Flyweight championship from 1916 to 1923.

Often regarded as the greatest British fighter of all time, he was the first official world flyweight champion and was rated by American boxing writer Nat Fleischer, as well as many other professionals and fans including former boxer, trainer, manager and promoter Charley "Broadway" Rose, as "the Greatest Flyweight Boxer Ever". Wilde earned various nicknames, such as "The Mighty Atom", "Ghost with the Hammer in His Hand", and "The Tylorstown Terror" due to his bludgeoning punching power. While reigning as the world's greatest flyweight, Wilde would take on bantamweights and even featherweights, and knock them out.

== Early years ==
Jimmy Wilde's birth certificate states that he was born in the Taff Bargoed Valley community of Pentwyn Deintyr) (now known as the Graig), Quakers Yard, Treharris, Wales, in the county borough of Merthyr Tydfil. His parents later moved to the village of Tylorstown in the Rhondda Valley when Wilde was around six years old. In the 1901 census eight year old William James Wilde, his parents and his three sisters were all recorded as speaking only Welsh. His father was a coal miner and Jimmy later worked in the pits himself, being small enough to crawl through gullies impassable to most of his colleagues. He started boxing at the age of 16 in fairground boxing booths, where crowds were amazed by his toughness and ability to knock down much larger opponents, most of whom were local men weighing around 200 lbs. In 1910, Wilde married his wife Elizabeth and was a father the same year. He left Tylorstown Colliery in 1913.

== Professional career ==
The record books often show that Wilde started boxing professionally in 1911, but it is widely assumed (and later confirmed by boxing analysts) that he had been fighting professionally for at least four years before that. His claim that he had at least 800 fights is probably greatly exaggerated, but it was certainly more than the 152 shown in Boxrec and elsewhere.

Managed by Teddy Lewis, (a former reserve captain of the local rugby club, Pontypridd RFC) Wilde went undefeated in 103 bouts, all of which were held in Britain, a remarkable achievement. In the middle of that streak, on 31 December 1912, he won the British 7 stone championship by beating Billy Padden by an eighteenth-round knockout in Glasgow. He finally lost his undefeated record when he challenged Tancy Lee for the vacant British Championship on 15 January 1915 in London. Ignoring his handlers advice to postpone the fight because he was suffering from Influenza, a weakened Wilde was stopped in the seventeenth round (of twenty).

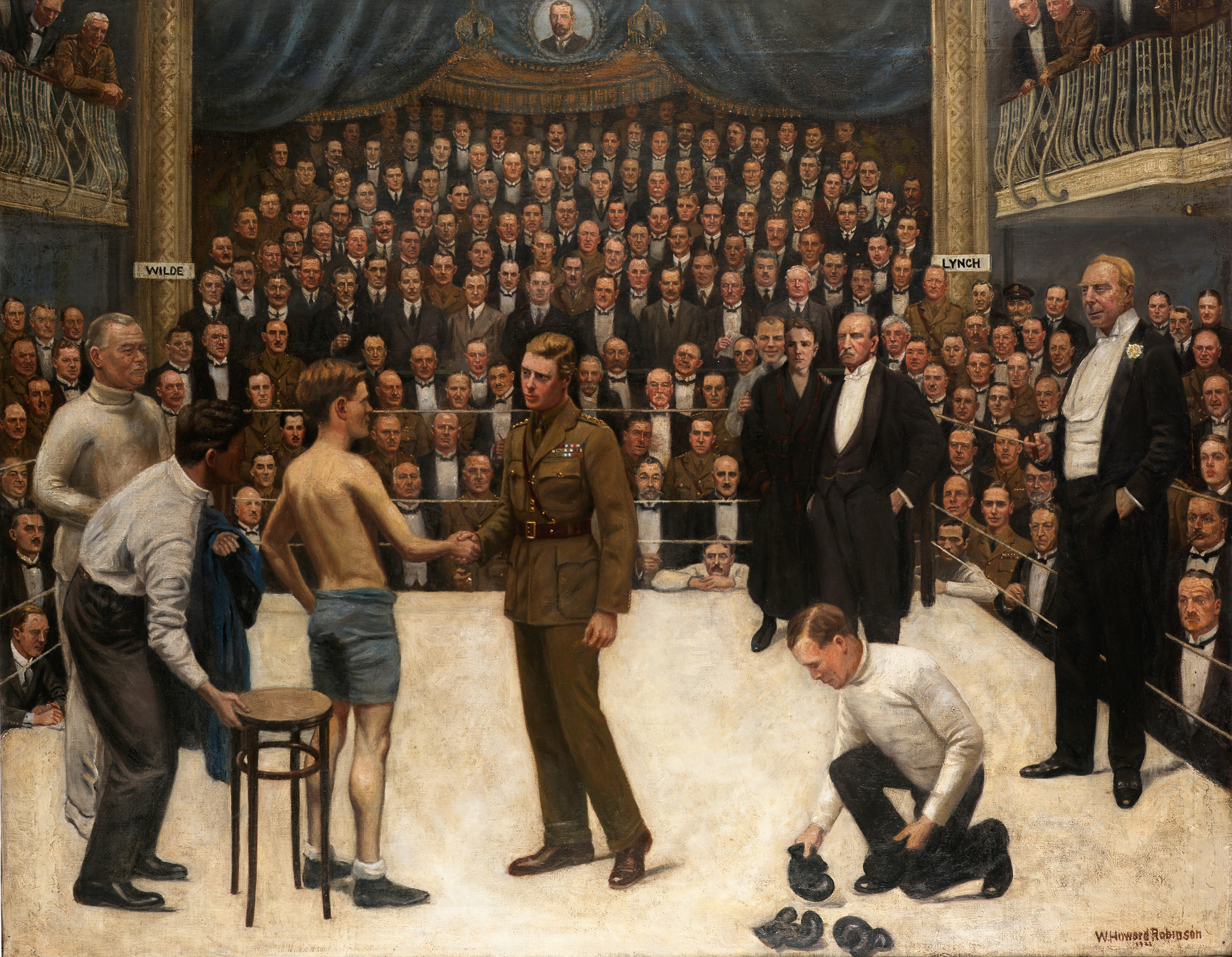
William Howard Robinson: A Welsh Victory at the National Sporting Club, 31 March 1919. (The Prince of Wales, later King Edward VIII, congratulates Jimmy Wilde.)

In 1915, Wilde was hospitalized, requiring an operation for "an internal complaint". After a sixteen-fight knockout streak, on 14 February 1916 he won the British flyweight title by beating Joe Symonds by a knockout in round twelve at the National Sporting Club in London. On 13 May, he had two fights on the same day at Woolwich barracks winning both by knockout, both fights combined lasted less than five rounds. On 26 June Wilde returned to the National Sporting Club to take his revenge on Tancy Lee with an eleventh-round knockout. On 18 December, Wilde became the first ever World Flyweight Champion when he defeated Young Zulu Kid of the United States, knocking him out in the eleventh round of their bout at the Holborn Stadium.

In late December 1916, after being rejected on two previous occasions due to an old leg problem from a colliery accident and for being underweight, Wilde was accepted into the British Army and while never seeing active service, became a physical training instructor at Aldershot.

In 1917, he retained the British title by beating George Clarke by a fourth round KO. He kept fighting and winning, and in 1919, he beat the great American bantamweight Joe Lynch who would later win the World bantamweight title.

Wilde travelled to the United States for a series of no decision fights. On 6 December 1919 Wilde "lost" to "Little" Jackie Sharkey in a controversial ten-round newspaper decision. According to the Milwaukee Journal (before a crowd close to 8,000 at the Auditorium in Milwaukee Wisconsin) Sharkey was considered to have won eight of the ten rounds according to the newspapermen at ringside. Sharkey's blows were said to land more frequently and with greater force. Sharkey's win was at least a minor upset as Wilde led in the early betting 2 to 1.

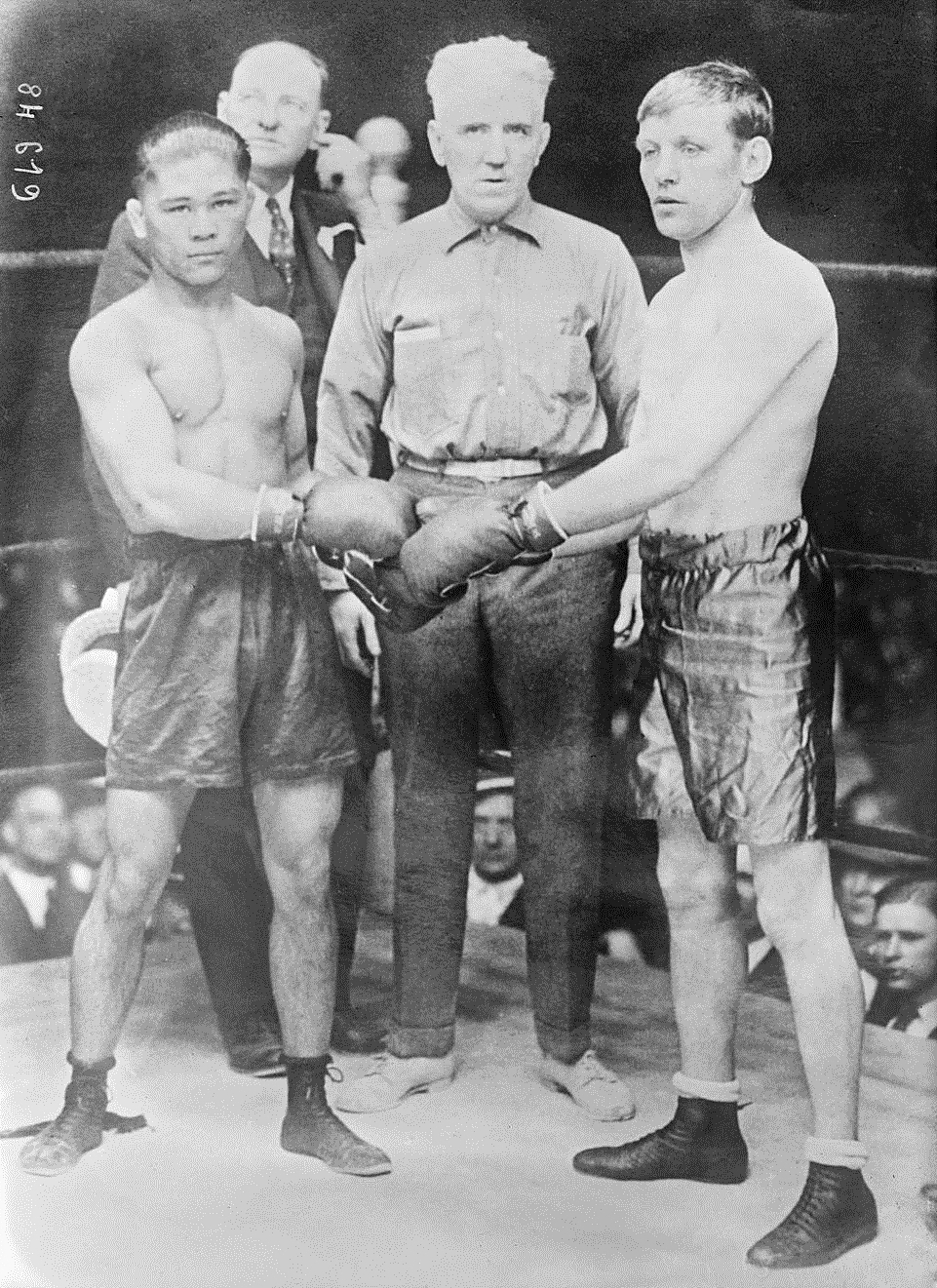
Pancho Villa (left) vs. Jimmy Wilde (right)

In 1920, Wilde went undefeated in 10 fights, but lost by a knockout in 17 rounds to former World Bantamweight Champion Pete Herman, who outweighed him by more than a stone (14 pounds), in 1921. The bout was originally scheduled as a title defence, but Herman had lost his championship to Lynch the month before. Herman easily regained the Bantamweight title from Lynch in July 1921, leading some to suspect that he had left the title behind with Lynch in America intentionally. That was the fight that marked his return to Britain after touring the United States all of 1920.

American promoter Tex Rickard (who promoted the Philippine sensation Pancho Villa) lured Wilde out of retirement with a promise of a £15,000 payday which was, at that time, a fortune. On 18 June 1923 at the Polo Grounds in New York, Wilde was knocked out in the seventh round by his younger opponent. Villa became the Philippines' first ever world champion. Wilde announced his retirement before returning to England, confirming his decision on 1 January 1924.

In 1927, at the age of 35, Wilde was reportedly considering making a comeback, but after consulting a specialist in head trauma, never returned to competitive boxing. Following retirement, Wilde invested his money into several businesses such as a cinema chain and a café on Barry Island, named "The Mighty Atom" after himself.

== Retirement ==
Wilde published a ghost-written autobiography in 1938 entitled Fighting Was My Business.

In the early 1930s Wilde's son David had a short career in professional boxing without any great success. He gave up boxing to run a hairdressers in north London.

In the 1930s Wilde lived in Hocroft Court, Cricklewood, from where almost all of his boxing trophies and medals were stolen in a 1936 burglary. He became a boxing referee, including in 1936 refereeing every bout of a boxing tournament at the Hastings Pier Pavilion. and he wrote an incisive weekly boxing column in the News of the World for nigh on two decades. In December 1936 he was injured after being thrown from his car when it collided with a van near Hampstead and suffered severe concussion.

After the War Wilde lived in Cadoxton, Barry, South Wales. In 1960 Wilde suffered facial injuries after being mugged at a train station in Cardiff. His wife, Elizabeth, died in 1967, and two years later Wilde, who was suffering from Diabetes and Dementia died at Whitchurch Hospital. He was buried alongside his wife in Barry Cemetery.

== Awards and recognition ==
With the longest unbeaten streak in boxing history, he went 103 fights before his first loss. Wilde had a record of 139 wins, 3 losses, 1 draw and 5 no-contests, with an impressive 99 wins by knockout. Ring Magazine, named him both the 3rd greatest puncher of all time, and the greatest flyweight of all time, and rated him as the 13th greatest fighter of the 20th century.

In 1990, he was elected to the inaugural class of the International Boxing Hall of Fame and in 1992, the Welsh Sports Hall of Fame.

He was ranked as the top flyweight of all-time by the International Boxing Research Organization in 2006.

== Professional boxing record ==
All information in this section is derived from BoxRec, unless otherwise stated.

=== Official record ===
150 fights	131 wins	3 losses
By knockout	98	3
By decision	31	0
By disqualification	2	0
Draws	1	
No contests	8	
Newspaper decisions/draws	7	

All newspaper decisions are officially regarded as "no decision" bouts and are not counted in the win/loss/draw column.

No.	Result	Record	Opponent	Type	Round	Date	Location	Notes
150	Loss	131–3–1 (15)	Pancho Villa	KO	7 (20)	Jun 18, 1923	Polo Grounds, New York City, New York, U.S.	Lost NBA flyweight title; For inaugural NYSAC and The Ring flyweight titles
149	Loss	131–2–1 (15)	Pete Herman	TKO	17 (20)	Jan 13, 1921	Royal Albert Hall, Kensington, London, England	
148	Win	131–1–1 (15)	Patsy Wallace	PTS	10	May 24, 1920	Toronto, Ontario, Canada	Retained world flyweight title
147	Win	130–1–1 (15)	Battling Al Murray	KO	2 (8)	May 13, 1920	National A.C., Philadelphia, Pennsylvania, U.S.	
146	Win	129–1–1 (15)	Bobby Dyson	KO	1 (12)	May 1, 1920	Cuddy's Arena, Lawrence, Massachusetts, U.S.	
145	Win	128–1–1 (15)	Battling Al Murray	TKO	8 (8)	Apr 21, 1920	Sportsman's Club, Camden, New Jersey, U.S.	Retained world flyweight title
144	Win	127–1–1 (15)	Young Zulu Kid	NWS	10	Apr 12, 1920	Windsor, Ontario, Canada	
143	Win	127–1–1 (14)	Frankie Mason	NWS	12	Mar 12, 1920	Coliseum, Toledo, Ohio, U.S.	World flyweight title at stake; (via KO only)
142	Win	127–1–1 (13)	Patsy Wallace	NWS	6	Mar 3, 1920	National A.C., Philadelphia, Pennsylvania, U.S.	
141	Win	127–1–1 (12)	Mickey Russell	TKO	7 (8)	Feb 19, 1920	4th Regiment Armory, Jersey City, New Jersey, U.S.	
140	Win	126–1–1 (12)	Mike Ertie	KO	3 (10)	Jan 29, 1920	Auditorium, Milwaukee, Wisconsin, U.S.	
139	Win	125–1–1 (12)	Babe Asher	NWS	8	Jan 8, 1920	Future City A.C., Saint Louis, Missouri, U.S.	
138	Loss	125–1–1 (11)	Jackie Sharkey	NWS	10	Dec 6, 1919	Auditorium, Milwaukee, Wisconsin, U.S.	
137	Win	125–1–1 (10)	Memphis Pal Moore	PTS	20	Jul 17, 1919	Olympia, Kensington, London, England	
136	Win	124–1–1 (10)	Alf Mansfield	TKO	13 (15)	Apr 21, 1919	Holborn Stadium, Holborn, London, England	
135	Win	123–1–1 (10)	Jimmy Buck	KO	3 (15)	Apr 21, 1919	Liverpool Stadium, Pudsey Street, Liverpool, Merseyside, England	
134	Win	122–1–1 (10)	Joe Lynch	PTS	15	Mar 31, 1919	National Sporting Club, Covent Garden, London, England	
133	Win	121–1–1 (10)	Joe Conn	TKO	12 (20)	Aug 31, 1918	Chelsea FC, Stamford Bridge, Chelsea, London, England	
132	Win	120–1–1 (10)	Dick Heasman	RTD	2 (20)	Apr 29, 1918	National Sporting Club, Covent Garden, London, England	Retained NSC British and world flyweight titles
131	Win	119–1–1 (10)	Corporal Jacobs	KO	4 (6)	Mar 28, 1918	Headquarters Gymnasium, Aldershot, Hampshire, England	
130	Win	118–1–1 (10)	Jimmy Russell	TKO	3 (15)	Mar 22, 1917	Holborn Stadium, Holborn, London, England	
129	Win	117–1–1 (10)	George Clark	TKO	4 (20)	Mar 12, 1917	National Sporting Club, Covent Garden, London, England	Retained IBU, NSC British, and world flyweight titles
128	Win	116–1–1 (10)	Young Zulu Kid	RTD	11 (20)	Dec 18, 1916	Holborn Stadium, Holborn, London, England	Won inaugural world flyweight title
127	Win	115–1–1 (10)	Tommy Noble	TKO	15 (20)	Nov 9, 1916	Liverpool Stadium, Pudsey Street, Liverpool, Merseyside, England	
126	Win	114–1–1 (10)	Johnny Hughes	KO	10 (20)	Jul 31, 1916	Kensal Rise Athletic Ground, Kensal Rise, London, England	Retained IBU and NSC British flyweight titles
125	Win	113–1–1 (10)	Tancy Lee	KO	11 (20)	Jun 26, 1916	National Sporting Club, Covent Garden, London, England	Retained IBU and vacant NSC British flyweight titles
124	Win	112–1–1 (10)	Tommy Harrison	RTD	8 (20)	May 29, 1916	Oxford Music Hall, London, England	
123	Win	111–1–1 (10)	Darkey Saunders	TKO	3 (6)	May 13, 1916	Woolwich Dockyard Labour Club, Woolwich, London, England	
122	Win	110–1–1 (10)	Joe Magnus	KO	2 (6)	May 13, 1916	Empire Theatre, Cardiff, Wales	
121	Win	109–1–1 (10)	Benny Thomas	PTS	15	Apr 29, 1916	Empire Theatre, Cardiff, Wales	
120	Win	108–1–1 (10)	Johnny Rosner	RTD	11 (20)	Apr 24, 1916	Liverpool Stadium, Pudsey Street, Liverpool, Merseyside, England	Retained IBU flyweight title
119	Win	107–1–1 (10)	Sid Smith	KO	3 (20)	Mar 27, 1916	Hoxton Baths, Hoxton, London, England	
118	Win	106–1–1 (10)	Sam Kellar	RTD	8 (20)	Mar 9, 1916	West London Stadium, Marylebone, London, England	
117	Win	105–1–1 (10)	Joe Symonds	RTD	12 (20)	Feb 14, 1916	National Sporting Club, Covent Garden, London, England	Won IBU and NSC British flyweight titles
116	Win	104–1–1 (10)	Jimmy Morton	KO	2 (15)	Jan 27, 1916	Liverpool Stadium, Pudsey Street, Liverpool, Merseyside, England	
115	Win	103–1–1 (10)	Tommy Noble	RTD	11 (20)	Jan 24, 1916	New Cross Baths, New Cross, London, England	
114	Win	102–1–1 (10)	Billy Young Rowlands	TKO	7 (20)	Jan 8, 1916	Empire, Swansea, Wales	
113	Win	101–1–1 (10)	Sid Smith	TKO	8 (15)	Dec 20, 1915	National Sporting Club, Covent Garden, London, England	
112	Win	100–1–1 (10)	Danny Elliott	KO	2 (15)	Dec 13, 1915	Central Baths, Bradford, Yorkshire, England	
111	Win	99–1–1 (10)	Johnny Best	TKO	14 (15)	Dec 9, 1915	Liverpool Stadium, Pudsey Street, Liverpool, Merseyside, England	
110	Win	98–1–1 (10)	Tommy Hughes	RTD	8 (15)	Nov 27, 1915	Palace Theatre, Barrow in Furness, Cumbria, England	
109	Win	97–1–1 (10)	Peter Cullen	RTD	9 (15)	Oct 20, 1915	Drill Hall, Dublin, Ireland	
108	Win	96–1–1 (10)	Walter Buchan	RTD	5 (15)	Sep 23, 1915	Liverpool Stadium, Pudsey Street, Liverpool, Merseyside, England	
107	Win	95–1–1 (10)	George Clark	RTD	8 (15)	Aug 14, 1915	Pheasant Inn Grounds, Carbrook, Yorkshire, England	
106	Win	94–1–1 (10)	Driver Bethuen	RTD	5 (10)	Jul 24, 1915	Pheasant Inn Grounds, Carbrook, Yorkshire, England	
105	Win	93–1–1 (10)	Sid Shields	KO	2 (20)	Mar 25, 1915	Liverpool Stadium, Pudsey Street, Liverpool, Merseyside, England	
104	Loss	92–1–1 (10)	Tancy Lee	TKO	17 (20)	Jan 25, 1915	National Sporting Club, Covent Garden, London, England	For vacant IBU, and NSC British flyweight title
103	Win	92–0–1 (10)	Sid Smith	TKO	9 (15)	Dec 3, 1914	Liverpool Stadium, Pudsey Street, Liverpool, Merseyside, England	Retained British 112lbs title claim
102	Win	91–0–1 (10)	Joe Symonds	PTS	15	Nov 16, 1914	National Sporting Club, Covent Garden, London, England	British flyweight title eliinator
101	Win	90–0–1 (10)	Alf Mansfield	RTD	9 (15)	Sep 28, 1914	West London Stadium, Marylebone, London, England	
100	Win	89–0–1 (10)	Young Baker	PTS	15	Aug 20, 1914	Boulevard Rink, Leicester, Leicestershire, England	
99	Win	88–0–1 (10)	Young Ted Walters	DQ	6 (15)	Aug 10, 1914	St James Hall, Newcastle, Tyne and Wear, England	
98	Win	87–0–1 (10)	Artie Edwards	PTS	15	Jul 23, 1914	Liverpool Stadium, Pudsey Street, Liverpool, Merseyside, England	
97	Win	86–0–1 (10)	Charley Jordan	RTD	10 (15)	Jul 23, 1914	New Marquee, Tonypandy, Wales	
96	Win	85–0–1 (10)	Charley Jordan	RTD	10 (15)	Jul 18, 1914	New Marquee, Tonypandy, Wales	
95	Win	84–0–1 (10)	Charlie Banyard	TKO	9 (15)	Jun 22, 1914	Market Hall, Aberdare, Wales	
94	Win	83–0–1 (10)	Georges Gloria	TKO	5 (15)	May 11, 1914	National Sporting Club, Covent Garden, London, England	
93	Win	82–0–1 (10)	Alf Mansfield	PTS	20	Apr 27, 1914	Olympia Skating Rink, Leeds, Yorkshires, England	
92	Win	81–0–1 (10)	Albert Bouzonnie	TKO	6 (15)	Apr 16, 1914	Liverpool Stadium, Pudsey Street, Liverpool, Merseyside, England	
91	Win	80–0–1 (10)	Jack Madden	KO	4 (15)	Apr 13, 1914	Portland Skating Rink, Ashton under Lyne, England	
90	Win	79–0–1 (10)	Eugene Husson	KO	6 (20)	Mar 30, 1914	National Sporting Club, Covent Garden, London, England	Won IBU flyweight title
89	Win	78–0–1 (10)	Bill Kyne	TKO	4 (15)	Mar 26, 1914	Liverpool Stadium, Pudsey Street, Liverpool, Merseyside, England	
88	Win	77–0–1 (10)	George Jaggers	RTD	5 (15)	Feb 16, 1914	Artillery Drill Hall, Sheffield, Yorkshire, England	
87	Win	76–0–1 (10)	Paddy Carroll	KO	2 (15)	Feb 12, 1914	Liverpool Stadium, Pudsey Street, Liverpool, Merseyside, England	
86	Win	75–0–1 (10)	Tom Thomas	TKO	7 (10)	Feb 9, 1914	Free Trade Hall, Manchester, England	
85	Win	74–0–1 (10)	Kid Nutter	PTS	15	Feb 2, 1914	Drill Hall, Birkenhead, Merseyside, England	
84	Win	73–0–1 (10)	Billy Young Padden	TKO	3 (15)	Jan 29, 1914	Liverpool Stadium, Pudsey Street, Liverpool, Merseyside, England	
83	Win	72–0–1 (10)	Young Beynon	PTS	15	Jan 8, 1914	Liverpool Stadium, Pudsey Street, Liverpool, Merseyside, England	
82	Win	71–0–1 (10)	Kid Nutter	PTS	15	Jan 3, 1914	Pavilion Skating Rink, Tonypandy, Wales	
81	Win	70–0–1 (10)	Harry Brooks	RTD	9 (15)	Dec 16, 1913	Free Trade Hall, Manchester	
80	Win	69–0–1 (10)	Billy Charles	RTD	6 (20)	Dec 13, 1913	Pavilion, Tonypandy, Wales	
79	Win	68–0–1 (10)	Young George Dando	DQ	10 (15)	Dec 6, 1913	Drill Hall, Merthyr Tydfil, Wales	
78	Win	67–0–1 (10)	Dido Gains	PTS	15	Nov 22, 1913	Drill Hall, Swansea, Wales	
77	Win	66–0–1 (10)	Jack Young Dyer	TKO	2 (15)	Nov 21, 1913	Manchester, England	
76	Win	65–0–1 (10)	Young Baker	RTD	10 (15)	Nov 13, 1913	Liverpool Stadium, Pudsey Street, Liverpool, Merseyside, England	
75	Win	64–0–1 (10)	Darkey Saunders	TKO	11 (15)	Nov 1, 1913	Pavilion Skating Rink, Tonypandy, Wales	
74	Win	63–0–1 (10)	Young George Dando	PTS	20	Sep 22, 1913	Westgate Rink, Cardiff, Wales	
73	Win	62–0–1 (10)	Kid Levene	RTD	7 (15)	Sep 18, 1913	Olympia Skating Rink, Hanley, Staffordshire, England	
72	Win	61–0–1 (10)	Harry Curley	RTD	12 (15)	Sep 11, 1913	Olympia Skating Rink, Hanley, Staffordshire, England	
71	Win	60–0–1 (10)	Dido Gains	PTS	15	Sep 8, 1913	Artillery Drill Hall, Sheffield, Yorkshire, England	
70	Win	59–0–1 (10)	Dick Jenkins	PTS	10	Sep 6, 1913	Ferndale, Wales	
69	Win	58–0–1 (10)	Jack Young Dyer	TKO	3 (15)	Aug 28, 1913	Liverpool Stadium, Pudsey Street, Liverpool, Merseyside, England	
68	Win	57–0–1 (10)	Darkey Saunders	PTS	10	Aug 4, 1913	American Skating Rink, Cardiff, Wales	
67	Win	56–0–1 (10)	Young George Dando	PTS	15	Jul 19, 1913	Tonypandy, Wales	
66	Win	55–0–1 (10)	Tommy Lewis	PTS	15	Jul 12, 1913	Pavilion, Tonypandy, Wales	
65	Win	54–0–1 (10)	Dick Lewis	RTD	3 (15)	Jul 1, 1913	Pavilion Skating Rink, Tonypandy, Wales	
64	Win	53–0–1 (10)	Gwilym Thomas	TKO	5 (15)	Jun 21, 1913	Pavilion Skating Rink, Tonypandy, Wales	
63	Win	52–0–1 (10)	Billy Young Padden	PTS	12	Jun 16, 1913	Pavilion Skating Rink, Tonypandy, Wales	
62	Win	51–0–1 (10)	Dai Davies	PTS	12	May 24, 1913	Pavilion Skating Rink, Tonypandy, Wales	
61	ND	50–0–1 (10)	Ivor Meredith	ND	10	May 5, 1913	Aberdare, Wales	
60	Win	50–0–1 (9)	Billy Yates	KO	4 (12)	Apr 19, 1913	Pavilion Skating Rink, Tonypandy, Wales	
59	Win	49–0–1 (9)	Will Rees	KO	2 (12)	Apr 12, 1913	Marquee, Tonypandy, Wales	
58	Win	48–0–1 (9)	Harry Taylor	RTD	3 (6)	Mar 24, 1913	Drill Hall, Swansea, Wales	
57	Win	47–0–1 (9)	Billy Young Rowlands	NWS	6	Mar 13, 1913	Drill Hall, Pentre, Wales	
56	Win	47–0–1 (8)	Dai Matthews	RTD	4 (12)	Mar 8, 1913	Marquee, Tonypandy, Wales	
55	ND	46–0–1 (8)	Harry Stuckey	ND	6	Mar 1, 1913	Hippodrome, Tonypandy, Wales	
54	Win	46–0–1 (7)	Ben Hardwick	NWS	8	Feb 22, 1913	Hippodrome, Tonypandy, Wales	
53	Win	46–0–1 (6)	James Kid Fitzpatrick	TKO	3 (20)	Feb 15, 1913	Pavilion, Tonypandy, Wales	
52	ND	45–0–1 (6)	Young Tony	ND	10	Feb 8, 1913	Scarrott's Pavilion, Tonypandy, Wales	
51	ND	45–0–1 (5)	Dick Jenkins	ND	10	Feb 1, 1913	Scarrott's Pavilion, Tonypandy, Wales	Agreed no-decision bout if Jenkins lasted the distance. Wilde was the unofficial winner
50	Win	45–0–1 (4)	Tommy Hughes	RTD	7 (15)	Jan 18, 1913	Hippodrome, Tonypandy, Wales	
49	Win	44–0–1 (4)	Billy Young Padden	TKO	18 (20)	Jan 1, 1913	Victoria AC, Glasgow, Scotland	
48	ND	43–0–1 (4)	Harry Stuckey	ND	6	Dec 28, 1912	Pavilion, Tonypandy, Wales	
47	Win	43–0–1 (3)	Billy Yates	RTD	4 (15)	Dec 21, 1912	Theatre Royal, Cardiff, Wales	
46	Win	42–0–1 (3)	Stoker Staines	KO	1 (15)	Dec 14, 1912	Pavilion, Tonypandy, Wales	
45	Win	41–0–1 (3)	Alf Williams	PTS	15	Nov 30, 1912	Pentre, Wales	
44	Win	40–0–1 (3)	Kid Pearson	RTD	2 (6)	Nov 23, 1912	Pavilion, Mountain Ash, Wales	
43	Win	39–0–1 (3)	Jim Ransford	RTD	2 (20)	Nov 16, 1912	Scarrott's Pavilion, Tonypandy, Wales	
42	Win	38–0–1 (3)	Llewellyn Boswell	PTS	6	Nov 13, 1912	Swansea, Wales	
41	Win	37–0–1 (3)	Phil Davies	RTD	2 (6)	Nov 9, 1912	Olympia Rink, Merthyr, Wales	
40	Win	36–0–1 (3)	Walter Hall	TKO	3 (6)	Sep 19, 1912	Attercliffe Boxing Hall, Sheffield, Yorkshire, England	
39	Win	35–0–1 (3)	Jim Stuckey	TKO	8 (8)	Aug 17, 1912	Pavilion, Tonypandy, Wales	
38	ND	34–0–1 (3)	Mike Flynn	ND	8	Aug 10, 1912	Pavilion, Tonypandy, Wales	
37	Win	34–0–1 (2)	Joe Gans	TKO	7 (8)	Aug 3, 1912	Pavilion, Tonypandy, Wales	
36	Win	33–0–1 (2)	Kid Morris	RTD	5 (20)	Jul 20, 1912	Welsh National A.C., Cardiff, Wales	
35	ND	32–0–1 (2)	Lewis Williams	ND	6	Jun 20, 1912	Mid Rhondda Athletic Grounds, Tonypandy, Wales	No decision trial bout
34	ND	32–0–1 (1)	Joe Wilson	ND	3	Jun 3, 1912	National Sporting Club, Covent Garden, London, England	No decision trial bout
33	Win	32–0–1	Roland Hall	KO	4 (?)	Apr 4, 1912	United Kingdom	
32	Win	31–0–1	Sam Jennings	PTS	6	Mar 9, 1912	Badminton Club, Cardiff	
31	Win	30–0–1	Sam Jennings	PTS	6	Feb 15, 1912	Millfield A.C., Pontypridd, Wales	
30	Win	29–0–1	Young Baker	PTS	6	Feb 1, 1912	Liverpool Stadium, Pudsey Street, Liverpool, Merseyside, England	
29	Win	28–0–1	Matt Wells' Nipper	TKO	1 (10)	Jan 20, 1912	The Ring, Blackfriars Road, Southwark, London, England	
28	Win	27–0–1	Ted Roberts	KO	4 (?)	Dec 20, 1911	Millfield A.C., Pontypridd, Wales	
27	Win	26–0–1	Young Towell	KO	3 (?)	Dec 12, 1911	Millfield A.C., Pontypridd, Wales	
26	Win	25–0–1	Jim Young Rice	KO	4 (?)	Nov 20, 1911	Millfield A.C., Pontypridd, Wales	
25	Win	24–0–1	Young Towell	KO	4 (?)	Nov 11, 1911	Millfield A.C., Pontypridd, Wales	
24	Win	23–0–1	Young Sam Langford	KO	2 (?)	Oct 30, 1911	Millfield A.C., Pontypridd, Wales	
23	Win	22–0–1	Young Powell	KO	3 (?)	Oct 20, 1911	Millfield A.C., Pontypridd, Wales	
22	Win	21–0–1	Joe Rogers	KO	5 (?)	Oct 10, 1911	Millfield A.C., Pontypridd, Wales	
21	Win	20–0–1	Ted Powell	KO	3 (?)	Sep 20, 1911	Millfield A.C., Pontypridd, Wales	
20	Win	19–0–1	Frank Avent	KO	4 (?)	Sep 9, 1911	Millfield A.C., Pontypridd, Wales	
19	Win	18–0–1	Sam Jennings	TKO	11 (15)	Aug 26, 1911	Millfield A.C., Pontypridd, Wales	
18	Win	17–0–1	Fred Chappell	PTS	6	Aug 8, 1911	Millfield A.C., Pontypridd, Wales	
17	Win	16–0–1	Steve Thomas	KO	3 (?)	Jul 7, 1911	Millfield A.C., Pontypridd, Wales	
16	Win	15–0–1	Kid Morris	PTS	6	Jun 20, 1911	Millfield A.C., Pontypridd, Wales	
15	Win	14–0–1	Billy Brown	KO	4 (?)	Jun 3, 1911	Millfield A.C., Pontypridd, Wales	
14	Win	13–0–1	Ted Roberts	KO	2 (?)	May 25, 1911	Millfield A.C., Pontypridd, Wales	
13	Win	12–0–1	Archie Grant	KO	3 (?)	May 15, 1911	Millfield A.C., Pontypridd, Wales	
12	Win	11–0–1	James Easton	PTS	10	May 8, 1911	Olympia, Edinburgh, Scotland	
11	Win	10–0–1	Dai Roberts	KO	3 (?)	May 5, 1911	Millfield A.C., Pontypridd, Wales	
10	Win	9–0–1	Billy Papke	KO	2 (?)	Apr 20, 1911	Millfield A.C., Pontypridd, Wales	
9	Win	8–0–1	Eddie Thomas	KO	2 (?)	Apr 10, 1911	Millfield A.C., Pontypridd, Wales	
8	Win	7–0–1	Archie Grant	KO	3 (?)	Apr 4, 1911	Millfield A.C., Pontypridd, Wales	
7	Win	6–0–1	Dai Thomas	TKO	3 (?)	Mar 20, 1911	Millfield A.C., Pontypridd, Wales	
6	Win	5–0–1	Lewis Williams	RTD	4 (6)	Mar 13, 1911	Millfield A.C., Pontypridd, Wales	
5	Win	4–0–1	Dick Jenkins	PTS	6	Mar 9, 1911	Cardiff, Wales	
4	Win	3–0–1	Young Williams	PTS	6	Feb 23, 1911	Millfield A.C., Pontypridd, Wales	
3	Draw	2–0–1	Dai Jones	PTS	6	Jan 20, 1911	Millfield A.C., Pontypridd, Wales	
2	Win	2–0	Dick Jenkins	PTS	6	Jan 10, 1911	Millfield A.C., Pontypridd, Wales	
1	Win	1–0	Ted Roberts	KO	3 (6)	Jan 1, 1911	Millfield A.C., Pontypridd, Wales	

=== Unofficial record ===
150 fights	137 wins	4 losses
By knockout	98	3
By decision	37	1
By disqualification	2	0
Draws	1	
No contests	8	

Record with the inclusion of newspaper decisions in the win/loss/draw column.

No.	Result	Record	Opponent	Type	Round	Date	Location	Notes
150	Loss	137–4–1 (8)	Pancho Villa	KO	7 (20)	Jun 18, 1923	Polo Grounds, New York City, New York, U.S.	Lost NBA flyweight title; For inaugural NYSAC and The Ring flyweight titles
149	Loss	137–3–1 (8)	Pete Herman	TKO	17 (20)	Jan 13, 1921	Royal Albert Hall, Kensington, London, England	
148	Win	137–2–1 (8)	Patsy Wallace	PTS	10	May 24, 1920	Toronto, Ontario, Canada	Retained world flyweight title
147	Win	136–2–1 (8)	Battling Al Murray	KO	2 (8)	May 13, 1920	National A.C., Philadelphia, Pennsylvania, U.S.	
146	Win	135–2–1 (8)	Bobby Dyson	KO	1 (12)	May 1, 1920	Cuddy's Arena, Lawrence, Massachusetts, U.S.	
145	Win	134–2–1 (8)	Battling Al Murray	TKO	8 (8)	Apr 21, 1920	Sportsman's Club, Camden, New Jersey, U.S.	Retained world flyweight title
144	Win	133–2–1 (8)	Young Zulu Kid	NWS	10	Apr 12, 1920	Windsor, Ontario, Canada	
143	Win	132–2–1 (8)	Frankie Mason	NWS	12	Mar 12, 1920	Coliseum, Toledo, Ohio, U.S.	World flyweight title at stake; (via KO only)
142	Win	131–2–1 (8)	Patsy Wallace	NWS	6	Mar 3, 1920	National A.C., Philadelphia, Pennsylvania, U.S.	
141	Win	130–2–1 (8)	Mickey Russell	TKO	7 (8)	Feb 19, 1920	4th Regiment Armory, Jersey City, New Jersey, U.S.	
140	Win	129–2–1 (8)	Mike Ertie	KO	3 (10)	Jan 29, 1920	Auditorium, Milwaukee, Wisconsin, U.S.	
139	Win	128–2–1 (8)	Babe Asher	NWS	8	Jan 8, 1920	Future City A.C., Saint Louis, Missouri, U.S.	
138	Loss	127–2–1 (8)	Jackie Sharkey	NWS	10	Dec 6, 1919	Auditorium, Milwaukee, Wisconsin, U.S.	
137	Win	127–1–1 (8)	Memphis Pal Moore	PTS	20	Jul 17, 1919	Olympia, Kensington, London, England	
136	Win	126–1–1 (8)	Alf Mansfield	TKO	13 (15)	Apr 21, 1919	Holborn Stadium, Holborn, London, England	
135	Win	125–1–1 (8)	Jimmy Buck	KO	3 (15)	Apr 21, 1919	Liverpool Stadium, Pudsey Street, Liverpool, Merseyside, England	
134	Win	124–1–1 (8)	Joe Lynch	PTS	15	Mar 31, 1919	National Sporting Club, Covent Garden, London, England	
133	Win	123–1–1 (8)	Joe Conn	TKO	12 (20)	Aug 31, 1918	Chelsea FC, Stamford Bridge, Chelsea, London, England	
132	Win	122–1–1 (8)	Dick Heasman	RTD	2 (20)	Apr 29, 1918	National Sporting Club, Covent Garden, London, England	Retained NSC British and world flyweight titles
131	Win	121–1–1 (8)	Corporal Jacobs	KO	4 (6)	Mar 28, 1918	Headquarters Gymnasium, Aldershot, Hampshire, England	
130	Win	120–1–1 (8)	Jimmy Russell	TKO	3 (15)	Mar 22, 1917	Holborn Stadium, Holborn, London, England	
129	Win	119–1–1 (8)	George Clark	TKO	4 (20)	Mar 12, 1917	National Sporting Club, Covent Garden, London, England	Retained IBU, NSC British, and world flyweight titles
128	Win	118–1–1 (8)	Young Zulu Kid	RTD	11 (20)	Dec 18, 1916	Holborn Stadium, Holborn, London, England	Won inaugural world flyweight title
127	Win	117–1–1 (8)	Tommy Noble	TKO	15 (20)	Nov 9, 1916	Liverpool Stadium, Pudsey Street, Liverpool, Merseyside, England	
126	Win	116–1–1 (8)	Johnny Hughes	KO	10 (20)	Jul 31, 1916	Kensal Rise Athletic Ground, Kensal Rise, London, England	Retained IBU and NSC British flyweight titles
125	Win	115–1–1 (8)	Tancy Lee	KO	11 (20)	Jun 26, 1916	National Sporting Club, Covent Garden, London, England	Retained IBU and vacant NSC British flyweight titles
124	Win	114–1–1 (8)	Tommy Harrison	RTD	8 (20)	May 29, 1916	Oxford Music Hall, London, England	
123	Win	113–1–1 (8)	Darkey Saunders	TKO	3 (6)	May 13, 1916	Woolwich Dockyard Labour Club, Woolwich, London, England	
122	Win	112–1–1 (8)	Joe Magnus	KO	2 (6)	May 13, 1916	Empire Theatre, Cardiff, Wales	
121	Win	111–1–1 (8)	Benny Thomas	PTS	15	Apr 29, 1916	Empire Theatre, Cardiff, Wales	
120	Win	110–1–1 (8)	Johnny Rosner	RTD	11 (20)	Apr 24, 1916	Liverpool Stadium, Pudsey Street, Liverpool, Merseyside, England	Retained IBU flyweight title
119	Win	109–1–1 (8)	Sid Smith	KO	3 (20)	Mar 27, 1916	Hoxton Baths, Hoxton, London, England	
118	Win	108–1–1 (8)	Sam Kellar	RTD	8 (20)	Mar 9, 1916	West London Stadium, Marylebone, London, England	
117	Win	107–1–1 (8)	Joe Symonds	RTD	12 (20)	Feb 14, 1916	National Sporting Club, Covent Garden, London, England	Won IBU and NSC British flyweight titles
116	Win	106–1–1 (8)	Jimmy Morton	KO	2 (15)	Jan 27, 1916	Liverpool Stadium, Pudsey Street, Liverpool, Merseyside, England	
115	Win	105–1–1 (8)	Tommy Noble	RTD	11 (20)	Jan 24, 1916	New Cross Baths, New Cross, London, England	
114	Win	104–1–1 (8)	Billy Young Rowlands	TKO	7 (20)	Jan 8, 1916	Empire, Swansea, Wales	
113	Win	103–1–1 (8)	Sid Smith	TKO	8 (15)	Dec 20, 1915	National Sporting Club, Covent Garden, London, England	
112	Win	102–1–1 (8)	Danny Elliott	KO	2 (15)	Dec 13, 1915	Central Baths, Bradford, Yorkshire, England	
111	Win	101–1–1 (8)	Johnny Best	TKO	14 (15)	Dec 9, 1915	Liverpool Stadium, Pudsey Street, Liverpool, Merseyside, England	
110	Win	100–1–1 (8)	Tommy Hughes	RTD	8 (15)	Nov 27, 1915	Palace Theatre, Barrow in Furness, Cumbria, England	
109	Win	99–1–1 (8)	Peter Cullen	RTD	9 (15)	Oct 20, 1915	Drill Hall, Dublin, Ireland	
108	Win	98–1–1 (8)	Walter Buchan	RTD	5 (15)	Sep 23, 1915	Liverpool Stadium, Pudsey Street, Liverpool, Merseyside, England	
107	Win	97–1–1 (8)	George Clark	RTD	8 (15)	Aug 14, 1915	Pheasant Inn Grounds, Carbrook, Yorkshire, England	
106	Win	96–1–1 (8)	Driver Bethuen	RTD	5 (10)	Jul 24, 1915	Pheasant Inn Grounds, Carbrook, Yorkshire, England	
105	Win	95–1–1 (8)	Sid Shields	KO	2 (20)	Mar 25, 1915	Liverpool Stadium, Pudsey Street, Liverpool, Merseyside, England	
104	Loss	94–1–1 (8)	Tancy Lee	TKO	17 (20)	Jan 25, 1915	National Sporting Club, Covent Garden, London, England	For vacant IBU, and NSC British flyweight title
103	Win	94–0–1 (8)	Sid Smith	TKO	9 (15)	Dec 3, 1914	Liverpool Stadium, Pudsey Street, Liverpool, Merseyside, England	Retained British 112lbs title claim
102	Win	93–0–1 (8)	Joe Symonds	PTS	15	Nov 16, 1914	National Sporting Club, Covent Garden, London, England	British flyweight title eliinator
101	Win	92–0–1 (8)	Alf Mansfield	RTD	9 (15)	Sep 28, 1914	West London Stadium, Marylebone, London, England	
100	Win	91–0–1 (8)	Young Baker	PTS	15	Aug 20, 1914	Boulevard Rink, Leicester, Leicestershire, England	
99	Win	90–0–1 (8)	Young Ted Walters	DQ	6 (15)	Aug 10, 1914	St James Hall, Newcastle, Tyne and Wear, England	
98	Win	89–0–1 (8)	Artie Edwards	PTS	15	Jul 23, 1914	Liverpool Stadium, Pudsey Street, Liverpool, Merseyside, England	
97	Win	88–0–1 (8)	Charley Jordan	RTD	10 (15)	Jul 23, 1914	New Marquee, Tonypandy, Wales	
96	Win	87–0–1 (8)	Charley Jordan	RTD	10 (15)	Jul 18, 1914	New Marquee, Tonypandy, Wales	
95	Win	86–0–1 (8)	Charlie Banyard	TKO	9 (15)	Jun 22, 1914	Market Hall, Aberdare, Wales	
94	Win	85–0–1 (8)	Georges Gloria	TKO	5 (15)	May 11, 1914	National Sporting Club, Covent Garden, London, England	
93	Win	84–0–1 (8)	Alf Mansfield	PTS	20	Apr 27, 1914	Olympia Skating Rink, Leeds, Yorkshires, England	
92	Win	83–0–1 (8)	Albert Bouzonnie	TKO	6 (15)	Apr 16, 1914	Liverpool Stadium, Pudsey Street, Liverpool, Merseyside, England	
91	Win	82–0–1 (8)	Jack Madden	KO	4 (15)	Apr 13, 1914	Portland Skating Rink, Ashton under Lyne, England	
90	Win	81–0–1 (8)	Eugene Husson	KO	6 (20)	Mar 30, 1914	National Sporting Club, Covent Garden, London, England	Won IBU flyweight title
89	Win	80–0–1 (8)	Bill Kyne	TKO	4 (15)	Mar 26, 1914	Liverpool Stadium, Pudsey Street, Liverpool, Merseyside, England	
88	Win	79–0–1 (8)	George Jaggers	RTD	5 (15)	Feb 16, 1914	Artillery Drill Hall, Sheffield, Yorkshire, England	
87	Win	78–0–1 (8)	Paddy Carroll	KO	2 (15)	Feb 12, 1914	Liverpool Stadium, Pudsey Street, Liverpool, Merseyside, England	
86	Win	77–0–1 (8)	Tom Thomas	TKO	7 (10)	Feb 9, 1914	Free Trade Hall, Manchester, England	
85	Win	76–0–1 (8)	Kid Nutter	PTS	15	Feb 2, 1914	Drill Hall, Birkenhead, Merseyside, England	
84	Win	75–0–1 (8)	Billy Young Padden	TKO	3 (15)	Jan 29, 1914	Liverpool Stadium, Pudsey Street, Liverpool, Merseyside, England	
83	Win	74–0–1 (8)	Young Beynon	PTS	15	Jan 8, 1914	Liverpool Stadium, Pudsey Street, Liverpool, Merseyside, England	
82	Win	73–0–1 (8)	Kid Nutter	PTS	15	Jan 3, 1914	Pavilion Skating Rink, Tonypandy, Wales	
81	Win	72–0–1 (8)	Harry Brooks	RTD	9 (15)	Dec 16, 1913	Free Trade Hall, Manchester	
80	Win	71–0–1 (8)	Billy Charles	RTD	6 (20)	Dec 13, 1913	Pavilion, Tonypandy, Wales	
79	Win	70–0–1 (8)	Young George Dando	DQ	10 (15)	Dec 6, 1913	Drill Hall, Merthyr Tydfil, Wales	
78	Win	69–0–1 (8)	Dido Gains	PTS	15	Nov 22, 1913	Drill Hall, Swansea, Wales	
77	Win	68–0–1 (8)	Jack Young Dyer	TKO	2 (15)	Nov 21, 1913	Manchester, England	
76	Win	67–0–1 (8)	Young Baker	RTD	10 (15)	Nov 13, 1913	Liverpool Stadium, Pudsey Street, Liverpool, Merseyside, England	
75	Win	66–0–1 (8)	Darkey Saunders	TKO	11 (15)	Nov 1, 1913	Pavilion Skating Rink, Tonypandy, Wales	
74	Win	65–0–1 (8)	Young George Dando	PTS	20	Sep 22, 1913	Westgate Rink, Cardiff, Wales	
73	Win	64–0–1 (8)	Kid Levene	RTD	7 (15)	Sep 18, 1913	Olympia Skating Rink, Hanley, Staffordshire, England	
72	Win	63–0–1 (8)	Harry Curley	RTD	12 (15)	Sep 11, 1913	Olympia Skating Rink, Hanley, Staffordshire, England	
71	Win	62–0–1 (8)	Dido Gains	PTS	15	Sep 8, 1913	Artillery Drill Hall, Sheffield, Yorkshire, England	
70	Win	61–0–1 (8)	Dick Jenkins	PTS	10	Sep 6, 1913	Ferndale, Wales	
69	Win	60–0–1 (8)	Jack Young Dyer	TKO	3 (15)	Aug 28, 1913	Liverpool Stadium, Pudsey Street, Liverpool, Merseyside, England	
68	Win	59–0–1 (8)	Darkey Saunders	PTS	10	Aug 4, 1913	American Skating Rink, Cardiff, Wales	
67	Win	58–0–1 (8)	Young George Dando	PTS	15	Jul 19, 1913	Tonypandy, Wales	
66	Win	57–0–1 (8)	Tommy Lewis	PTS	15	Jul 12, 1913	Pavilion, Tonypandy, Wales	
65	Win	56–0–1 (8)	Dick Lewis	RTD	3 (15)	Jul 1, 1913	Pavilion Skating Rink, Tonypandy, Wales	
64	Win	55–0–1 (8)	Gwilym Thomas	TKO	5 (15)	Jun 21, 1913	Pavilion Skating Rink, Tonypandy, Wales	
63	Win	54–0–1 (8)	Billy Young Padden	PTS	12	Jun 16, 1913	Pavilion Skating Rink, Tonypandy, Wales	
62	Win	53–0–1 (8)	Dai Davies	PTS	12	May 24, 1913	Pavilion Skating Rink, Tonypandy, Wales	
61	ND	52–0–1 (8)	Ivor Meredith	ND	10	May 5, 1913	Aberdare, Wales	
60	Win	52–0–1 (7)	Billy Yates	KO	4 (12)	Apr 19, 1913	Pavilion Skating Rink, Tonypandy, Wales	
59	Win	51–0–1 (7)	Will Rees	KO	2 (12)	Apr 12, 1913	Marquee, Tonypandy, Wales	
58	Win	50–0–1 (7)	Harry Taylor	RTD	3 (6)	Mar 24, 1913	Drill Hall, Swansea, Wales	
57	Win	49–0–1 (7)	Billy Young Rowlands	NWS	6	Mar 13, 1913	Drill Hall, Pentre, Wales	
56	Win	48–0–1 (7)	Dai Matthews	RTD	4 (12)	Mar 8, 1913	Marquee, Tonypandy, Wales	
55	ND	47–0–1 (7)	Harry Stuckey	ND	6	Mar 1, 1913	Hippodrome, Tonypandy, Wales	
54	Win	47–0–1 (6)	Ben Hardwick	NWS	8	Feb 22, 1913	Hippodrome, Tonypandy, Wales	
53	Win	46–0–1 (6)	James Kid Fitzpatrick	TKO	3 (20)	Feb 15, 1913	Pavilion, Tonypandy, Wales	
52	ND	45–0–1 (6)	Young Tony	ND	10	Feb 8, 1913	Scarrott's Pavilion, Tonypandy, Wales	
51	ND	45–0–1 (5)	Dick Jenkins	ND	10	Feb 1, 1913	Scarrott's Pavilion, Tonypandy, Wales	Agreed no-decision bout if Jenkins lasted the distance. Wilde was the unofficial winner
50	Win	45–0–1 (4)	Tommy Hughes	RTD	7 (15)	Jan 18, 1913	Hippodrome, Tonypandy, Wales	
49	Win	44–0–1 (4)	Billy Young Padden	TKO	18 (20)	Jan 1, 1913	Victoria AC, Glasgow, Scotland	
48	ND	43–0–1 (4)	Harry Stuckey	ND	6	Dec 28, 1912	Pavilion, Tonypandy, Wales	
47	Win	43–0–1 (3)	Billy Yates	RTD	4 (15)	Dec 21, 1912	Theatre Royal, Cardiff, Wales	
46	Win	42–0–1 (3)	Stoker Staines	KO	1 (15)	Dec 14, 1912	Pavilion, Tonypandy, Wales	
45	Win	41–0–1 (3)	Alf Williams	PTS	15	Nov 30, 1912	Pentre, Wales	
44	Win	40–0–1 (3)	Kid Pearson	RTD	2 (6)	Nov 23, 1912	Pavilion, Mountain Ash, Wales	
43	Win	39–0–1 (3)	Jim Ransford	RTD	2 (20)	Nov 16, 1912	Scarrott's Pavilion, Tonypandy, Wales	
42	Win	38–0–1 (3)	Llewellyn Boswell	PTS	6	Nov 13, 1912	Swansea, Wales	
41	Win	37–0–1 (3)	Phil Davies	RTD	2 (6)	Nov 9, 1912	Olympia Rink, Merthyr, Wales	
40	Win	36–0–1 (3)	Walter Hall	TKO	3 (6)	Sep 19, 1912	Attercliffe Boxing Hall, Sheffield, Yorkshire, England	
39	Win	35–0–1 (3)	Jim Stuckey	TKO	8 (8)	Aug 17, 1912	Pavilion, Tonypandy, Wales	
38	ND	34–0–1 (3)	Mike Flynn	ND	8	Aug 10, 1912	Pavilion, Tonypandy, Wales	
37	Win	34–0–1 (2)	Joe Gans	TKO	7 (8)	Aug 3, 1912	Pavilion, Tonypandy, Wales	
36	Win	33–0–1 (2)	Kid Morris	RTD	5 (20)	Jul 20, 1912	Welsh National A.C., Cardiff, Wales	
35	ND	32–0–1 (2)	Lewis Williams	ND	6	Jun 20, 1912	Mid Rhondda Athletic Grounds, Tonypandy, Wales	No decision trial bout
34	ND	32–0–1 (1)	Joe Wilson	ND	3	Jun 3, 1912	National Sporting Club, Covent Garden, London, England	No decision trial bout
33	Win	32–0–1	Roland Hall	KO	4 (?)	Apr 4, 1912	United Kingdom	
32	Win	31–0–1	Sam Jennings	PTS	6	Mar 9, 1912	Badminton Club, Cardiff	
31	Win	30–0–1	Sam Jennings	PTS	6	Feb 15, 1912	Millfield A.C., Pontypridd, Wales	
30	Win	29–0–1	Young Baker	PTS	6	Feb 1, 1912	Liverpool Stadium, Pudsey Street, Liverpool, Merseyside, England	
29	Win	28–0–1	Matt Wells' Nipper	TKO	1 (10)	Jan 20, 1912	The Ring, Blackfriars Road, Southwark, London, England	
28	Win	27–0–1	Ted Roberts	KO	4 (?)	Dec 20, 1911	Millfield A.C., Pontypridd, Wales	
27	Win	26–0–1	Young Towell	KO	3 (?)	Dec 12, 1911	Millfield A.C., Pontypridd, Wales	
26	Win	25–0–1	Jim Young Rice	KO	4 (?)	Nov 20, 1911	Millfield A.C., Pontypridd, Wales	
25	Win	24–0–1	Young Towell	KO	4 (?)	Nov 11, 1911	Millfield A.C., Pontypridd, Wales	
24	Win	23–0–1	Young Sam Langford	KO	2 (?)	Oct 30, 1911	Millfield A.C., Pontypridd, Wales	
23	Win	22–0–1	Young Powell	KO	3 (?)	Oct 20, 1911	Millfield A.C., Pontypridd, Wales	
22	Win	21–0–1	Joe Rogers	KO	5 (?)	Oct 10, 1911	Millfield A.C., Pontypridd, Wales	
21	Win	20–0–1	Ted Powell	KO	3 (?)	Sep 20, 1911	Millfield A.C., Pontypridd, Wales	
20	Win	19–0–1	Frank Avent	KO	4 (?)	Sep 9, 1911	Millfield A.C., Pontypridd, Wales	
19	Win	18–0–1	Sam Jennings	TKO	11 (15)	Aug 26, 1911	Millfield A.C., Pontypridd, Wales	
18	Win	17–0–1	Fred Chappell	PTS	6	Aug 8, 1911	Millfield A.C., Pontypridd, Wales	
17	Win	16–0–1	Steve Thomas	KO	3 (?)	Jul 7, 1911	Millfield A.C., Pontypridd, Wales	
16	Win	15–0–1	Kid Morris	PTS	6	Jun 20, 1911	Millfield A.C., Pontypridd, Wales	
15	Win	14–0–1	Billy Brown	KO	4 (?)	Jun 3, 1911	Millfield A.C., Pontypridd, Wales	
14	Win	13–0–1	Ted Roberts	KO	2 (?)	May 25, 1911	Millfield A.C., Pontypridd, Wales	
13	Win	12–0–1	Archie Grant	KO	3 (?)	May 15, 1911	Millfield A.C., Pontypridd, Wales	
12	Win	11–0–1	James Easton	PTS	10	May 8, 1911	Olympia, Edinburgh, Scotland	
11	Win	10–0–1	Dai Roberts	KO	3 (?)	May 5, 1911	Millfield A.C., Pontypridd, Wales	
10	Win	9–0–1	Billy Papke	KO	2 (?)	Apr 20, 1911	Millfield A.C., Pontypridd, Wales	
9	Win	8–0–1	Eddie Thomas	KO	2 (?)	Apr 10, 1911	Millfield A.C., Pontypridd, Wales	
8	Win	7–0–1	Archie Grant	KO	3 (?)	Apr 4, 1911	Millfield A.C., Pontypridd, Wales	
7	Win	6–0–1	Dai Thomas	TKO	3 (?)	Mar 20, 1911	Millfield A.C., Pontypridd, Wales	
6	Win	5–0–1	Lewis Williams	RTD	4 (6)	Mar 13, 1911	Millfield A.C., Pontypridd, Wales	
5	Win	4–0–1	Dick Jenkins	PTS	6	Mar 9, 1911	Cardiff, Wales	
4	Win	3–0–1	Young Williams	PTS	6	Feb 23, 1911	Millfield A.C., Pontypridd, Wales	
3	Draw	2–0–1	Dai Jones	PTS	6	Jan 20, 1911	Millfield A.C., Pontypridd, Wales	
2	Win	2–0	Dick Jenkins	PTS	6	Jan 10, 1911	Millfield A.C., Pontypridd, Wales	
1	Win	1–0	Ted Roberts	KO	3 (6)	Jan 1, 1911	Millfield A.C., Pontypridd, Wales	

== Titles in boxing ==
=== Major world titles ===
- World flyweight champion (112 lbs)
- NBA (WBA) flyweight champion (Note: Awarded inaugural title in January 1921.) (112 lbs)

=== Regional/International titles ===
- Lonsdale Belt flyweight champion (112 lbs)
- IBU (European) flyweight champion (112 lbs) (2×)
- British flyweight champion (112 lbs)

== See also ==
- List of Welsh boxing world champions

== Notes and references ==
=== References ===
Achievements
Inaugural Champion	World Flyweight Champion; 18 December 1916 – 18 June 1923	Succeeded by Pancho Villa
