= Ocean Wilsons =

British investment holding company

- Type: Public limited company
- Traded as: LSE: OCN
- Industry: Financial services
- Founded: 1907
- Headquarters: Hamilton, Bermuda
- Key people: Caroline Foulger (chair)
- Revenue: ▼$20.5 million (2024)
- Operating income: ▼$11.2 million (2024)
- Net income: ▲$119.1 million (2024)
- Website: www.oceanwilsons.bm

Ocean Wilsons (Holdings) Limited is an investment holding company based in Hamilton, Bermuda. It is in the course of disposing of its maritime services business based in Brazil. It was listed on the London Stock Exchange until it was acquired by Hansa Investment Company in December 2025.

== History ==
The company was formed, in 1907, by the merger of the Ocean Coal Company, which operated eight coal mines in Wales, and Wilson, Sons, which operated as a global shipping business. The Ocean Coal Company had been founded by David Davies in the 1880s, while Wilson, Sons had been established in Salvador by two Scottish brothers, Edward and Fleetwood Pellew Wilson in 1837. The intention was to use the ships to transport the coal from Barry Docks in South Wales to destinations around the world. Major collieries operated by the company included the Deep Navigation Colliery near Treharris.

After the Second World War, the coal mining industry was nationalised. The company lost its industrial assets, invested the proceeds and sought to diversify its activities. Hansa Trust (now Hansa Investment Company) took a significant shareholding in the company in the late 1950s.

In 1978, the company formed a joint venture with Inchcape to provide maritime services in Brazil, and, in 1981, it formed another joint venture with Inchcape, this time to act as a distributor of Mercedes cars in Brazil. The car distribution business was not a success, and the company bought Inchcape out in 1986 and then sold the business in 1992. The company was then the subject of an initial public offering that same year.

Ocean Wilsons also bought Inchcape out of the maritime services business but then floated a 41.75% stake in that company on the Brazil Stock Exchange as "Wilson, Sons" in 2007. The company continued to operate with two separate businesses, diversified investments and maritime services in Brazil, until October 2024, when the company announced the disposal of its remaining 56.47% stake in Wilson, Sons, to Mediterranean Shipping Company for $768 million, leaving Ocean Wilsons as a pure diversified investments business. The company said that it expected the disposal to be completed by 30 September 2025.

In June 2025, Hansa Investment Company (formerly Hansa Trust) offered to acquire all the shares it did not already own in Ocean Wilsons. A court hearing scheduled for 23 September 2025, which was to consider the transaction, was postponed after an objection from the investment management firm, Arnhold LLC. Nevertheless, the company was removed from the FTSE 250 Index as FTSE Russell decided that it was too late to reverse the intended removal of the company from the index. The takeover was completed in December 2025.
