= Deep Navigation Colliery =

Coordinates: 51°40′04″N 3°18′03″W

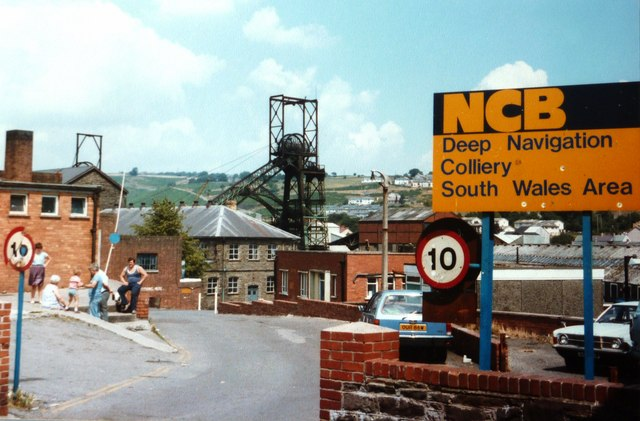
The entrance to the former Deep Navigation Colliery, Treharris, in July 1984

Deep Navigation Colliery was a coal mine in South Wales, that operated from 1872 until 1991.

Located next to the co-developed village of Treharris in the borough of Merthyr Tydfil, on development it was the deepest coalmine in South Wales Coalfield by some 200 yards (180 m). Producing the highest quality steam coal, it powered both the Cunard passenger steamers RMS Mauretania and RMS Lusitania in their successful attempts at the Blue Riband prize for the most rapid Atlantic Ocean passage. The mine is also thought to have been one of several locally that provided coal to the RMS Titanic; tests carried out on coal found in the ship's wreck have shown that most of the coal on board originated in South Wales. One of the first collieries in South Wales to have shafts wound by electricity, it was the first colliery in South Wales to have pit head baths for its miners. Profitable due to the quality of its coal, but financially degraded by huge volumes of water ingress throughout its working life, it was closed by British Coal on Good Friday, 1991.

Today the wider local site, which was also occupied by the nearby Taff Merthyr Colliery and the Trelewis Drift Mine, has been redeveloped into the wildlife and leisure park, Parc Taff Bargoed.

== Harris Navigation: 1872–1893 ==
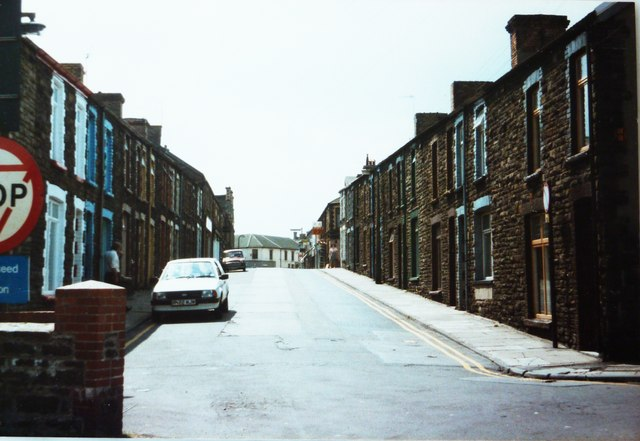
The view up Fox Street, Treharris, from the entrance gate to the Deep Navigation Colliery. The photograph was taken during the 1984 miners' strike, in July 1984

In the early 1800s, a mineral lease was granted over 3,000 acres (1,200 ha) of land, owned by three farms: Twyn-y Garreg; Pantanas; Cefn Forest. A group of businessmen, led by Frederick W. Harris, began negotiations for the rights to the mineral lease, which was eventually acquired in 1872. Nothing existed in the area at the time, except for the three farms and their outbuildings, plus the quiet River Taff Bargoed and a small forest on the slopes above the valley.

With a proposed name of Harris Navigation Steam Coal Company, development commenced with the construction a row of temporary small houses, built for the families and men who were to be employed to sink the pit. Named the Twyn-y-Garreg huts, they all had wooden frames covered by whitewashed hessian for walls. House No.1 was specially created for the Minnett family of two adults and ten children, and had four bedrooms. The remainder were classical 2 up/2 down room formation terraced-style houses, with a kitchen and parlour on the ground floor, and two bedrooms upstairs. Heating came from a coal fire placed under a stone or brick chimney stack, and the huts were completed with slate roofs. All materials for the huts' construction came from locally obtained resources within the bounds of the mineral lease, including the development of a firestone quarry to the north of the colliery site. The new development was called Treharris ('Harris town' in Welsh).

Construction of the main shafts began in October 1872, with sinking commencing in February 1873. Due to the required depth of the shafts to access the coal seams, the operation would prove to be both expensive and dangerous, and create the lifelong operational need to continually extract water due to high levels of ingress. The 167 men of the construction crew were not paid on time on a number of occasions, with final construction costs in May 1878 running to over £300,000, and seven men having lost their lives. The two shafts were built 180 feet (55 m) apart: North to a depth of 649 yards (593 m); South to 760 yards (690 m). This was 200 yards (180 m) deeper than any other colliery in the South Wales Coalfield at the time, to allow access the Nine Feet Seam.

Before coal could be extracted commercially, surface buildings were required to be completed. This included the installation of two John Fowler & Co. winding machines, and the forest fully cleared, with wood stored for pit props. Finally, the River Taff Bargoed was enclosed in a 0.3 miles (0.48 km) tunnel constructed of bricks made from the collieries quarry, enabling water ingress to the mine to be significantly reduced, and slag heaps to be placed on the resultant new land.

The first commercial coal was raised at North pit from 1879, and by 1881 both shafts were raising coal. But by this point the colliery company was deep in debt. The only reason that funding had been forthcoming from the shareholders, commercial backers and banks was due to the potential high quality of the coal that could be extracted, and so it proved. The depth of the shafts and the quality of the steam coal extracted hence earned the colliery two nicknames in the South Wales coalfield: "Deep Navigation" and "Ocean Colliery".

=== Water ingress ===
Due to shaft depth, the major problem with the mine throughout its life was water ingress, with a reported maximum ingress during its operational life of 1,000 imperial gallons (4,500 L; 1,200 US gal) entering the pit every minute.

After the first commercial coal was extracted in 1879, the colliery started construction of Cornish Beam engine, capable of extracting over 200 imperial gallons (910 L; 240 US gal) a stroke. Supplied by the Perran Foundry of Truro, water was lifted in stages to different levels, until it reached the surface and was dispersed into pit pond located north of the colliery.

Later, mine engineer Castell created the famous Deep Navigation “Castle.” A man-made cavern hewn by hand from solid rock, it was built to store water for removal. Located adjacent to the North pit shaft, it was 70 yards (64 m) long, 30 yards (27 m) wide and 5 yards (4.6 m) high. Inside was installed an electric sump pump, which connected to a surface pipe that spilled into the same pit pond as the beam engine.

== Ocean Colliery: 1893–1947 ==
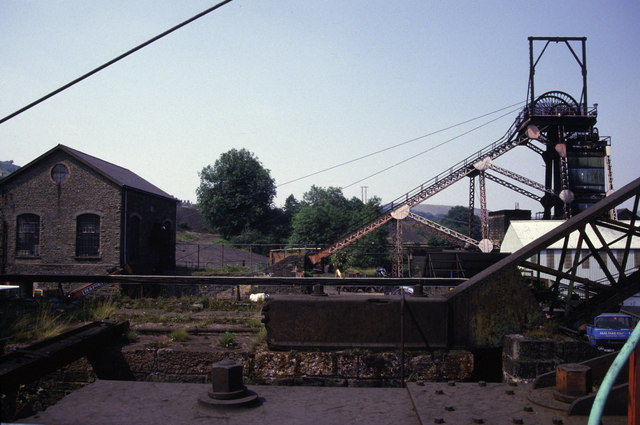
Treharris One winding house, Deep Navigation in July 1987

Industrialist businessman David Davies of Llandinam, became interested in the Harris mine as early as 1890. By this time, almost one million tonnes of coal had been raised, but by 1892 there was a dip in production. With debts rising, Harris allowed an inspection of the mine by Davies, whose engineers reported that were good reserves of coal in a mine that required relatively little additional investment.

Davies's Ocean Coal Company took ownership of the colliery on 17 January 1893, and renamed it Ocean Colliery. There was great competition at the time between colliery owners, with most trying to prove to potential purchasers that their coal was of the best quality. At the time this was signified by being selected by the Royal Navy, and the various transatlantic ocean liners, including the Cunard Line; hence the choice of the renaming.

Davies invested in the colliery, including repairing the bases of the shafts. From 1897 onwards, the colliery was producing over 590,000 tons per year with a workforce of 2,500 miners. Ocean Company invested a further £500,000 in 1900 to make the colliery's production more economic, so that by 1902, annual output was 327,000 tons by 2,000 men. The steam coal produced during this period was purchased for use by the Cunard steamers RMS Mauretania and RMS Lusitania, used in their successful attempts for the Blue Riband for the most rapid Atlantic passage.

The South Wales Miners' Federation had been formed in 1894, and in 1910 and 1911 the Tonypandy riots had occurred to improve miners' incomes and working conditions. By 1913, the workforce had shrunk to 1,846 men and boys. At this time Deep Navigation had an extensive underground 2 ft (610 mm) mine railway, with 10 miles (16 km) of underground railways. Over 100 pit ponies were being used at the colliery, mostly underground, but some on the surface.

=== Pit head baths ===
In 1913, Davies sent a party of 15 men to the continent to investigate European systems of working practice. As a result of their report, a sum of £8,000 was authorised to build new baths for the miners. The new Treharris baths were constructed by Nicholls & Nicholls of Gloucester, that could accommodate 1,824 men at a time, who were each provided with two lockers: one for clean and the other for dirty clothes. Officially opened on 1 November 1933 by Ocean Coal Company director Thomas Evans O.B.E. of Pentyrch, the baths were the first such facility in South Wales.

Having constructed a new power house, which was also supplying Lady Windsor Colliery, the facility was electrically lit, and included an early electric shoe cleaner. The baths were reconstructed in 1933, by which time Ocean had provided baths at Risca, Wattstown, Lady Windsor, Garw, Nantymeol and Nine mile point collieries.

=== After World War I ===
After supplying the Royal Navy during World War I, by 1920 the colliery was using the “Barry of Nottingham” system of coal cutting, a forerunner of longwall mining. From a 1923 report by HM Inspectorate of Mines, there were 2,328 men employed, working the Seven Feet, Yard and Nine Feet seams. But by the time of the 1926 General Strike, industrial relations had again broken down. The village of Treharris was staunchly socialist, and was innovative in using the colliery band and local jazz music Treharris Zulus group to raise funds. But by the new year the families were running short of funds, food and fuel, and the workers quickly returned to work. By 1935, the colliery employed 363 men on the surface and 1,875 underground.

At the start of World War II, Ernest Bevin introduced a new law that tied the miners to their reserved occupation. Bevin also ordered one in ten young men of eighteen years of age to be employed in the coal industry, with some of the Bevin boys coming to the Treharris area.

== Deep Navigation: 1947–1991 ==
By 1945 there were 1,826 men working at the complex. After nationalisation in 1947, the colliery was finally named Deep Navigation by the National Coal Board.

The NCB made various investments in the colliery, and the fact that the Westminster government was a Clement Attlee-led Labour government, made industrial relations smoother. Investments included the demolition in the mid-1950s of the original 1870 Twyn-y-Garreg huts, but the site remained dormant almost until the colliery closed, when the new Navigation Street was built. By 1960, this investment had resulted in the workforce dropping to just over 1,000 miners.

Being located close, the colliery stopped working on announcement of the Aberfan disaster on Friday 21 October 1966, sending all available manpower to the recovery effort. As a result, a few children were pulled out alive in the first hour, but no survivors were found after 11 a.m. that day.

The last pit pony was retired in 1973, at the time when the colliery won the first of its contracts to supply Aberthaw power station. The centenary celebrations of 1979 saw over 2,000 people descend to pit bottom, with weekly production at around 8,500 tonnes/week.

=== A decade of industrial decline ===
After an investment in a new canteen in 1982, and a confirmed £6 million investment in 1983 in a new high-speed conveyor extraction system installed, the 1984 Miners’ Strike could not have been more poorly timed.

At the end of the dispute, reform was the agenda of the Conservative government. But the miners still hoped that the 1983 report that concluded there were at least 11 million tons of coal reserves accessible to the colliery, would keep them open. The report further suggested that development of the new “Gellideg” seams at a depth of 2,500 feet (760 m), would guarantee that the colliery could operate in profit for at least another 20 years.

The NCB became the privatised British Coal in 1987, but this was on the back of £2 million investment in the colliery in new machinery. An industrial dispute over required new work practices, resulted in a single pit strike that cost the company £150,000. Production resumed, but faltered again in November with a week-long strike which lost 10,000 tonnes of production.

Now British Coal were warned that output was at least 5,000 tonnes below target, and that further disputes would financially jeopardise the future of the colliery. By 1989, Deep Navigation stood alone in the Taff Bargoed valley, making a profit and with coal production rising. But closure occurred that year of both the Taff Merthyr Colliery and the Trelewis Drift Mine, amongst a host of closures in the South Wales Coalfield. The colliery probably survived, as despite the 1984 Miners Strike, average output that decade had reached 375,000 tons per year.

=== Closure ===
In 1990, Deep Navigation was not added to British Coal's list of mines for closure, with a reported profit of £1 million to August 1990. The colliery received a single new Dosco roadheader in March that year.

However, a geological report issued in the autumn concluded that, due to structural problems in the surrounding substrata, coal reserves would only last until 1994. After a period of consultation with the greatly weakened National Union of Mineworkers, in January 1991, British Coal announced the closure of Deep Navigation from Good Friday, 29 March 1991.

The Dosco machine was one of the few items retrieved from pit bottom to the surface. On Sunday 23 March, each miner was allowed to take two guests for a tour of the pit bottom circuit, where they were all presented with a commemorative medal. Deep Navigation NUM lodge provided each working and recently retired miner with a presentation Davy lamp, with over 800 lamps distributed.

On the last working day, the Salvation Army band under the direction of Bandmaster Thomas Fredrick Willetts marched with the last shift to the town hall, accompanied by the MP for Merthyr Tydfil and Rhymney, Ted Rowlands, and the MP for Pontypridd, Dr Kim Howells, formally NUM South Wales research officer. Deep Navigation closed with 766 men on the books.

The site was cleared from 1993 onwards, but the associated coal washery stayed open for another nine months, so that a stockpile of 370,000 tonnes could be prepared for market. In 1995 it took a week, working 12 hours a day, to fill the three shafts with rubble from the demolished pit head buildings.

== Transport ==
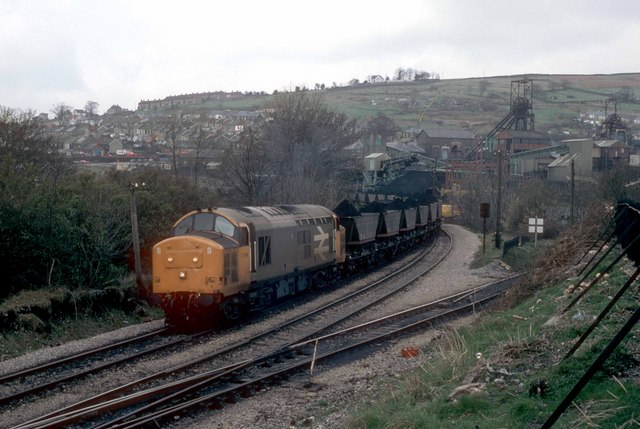
British Railways Class 37 in charge of a Merry-go-round train group of coal hoppers, freshly loaded from Deep Navigation Colliery, April 1987

Located adjacent to Quakers Yard railway station, the colliery had access to Cardiff Docks via both the Great Western's Taff Vale Railway, and the Midland Railway's Rhymney Railway. The Rhymney Railway also gave access north to Brecon via the Brecon and Merthyr Railway, and onwards to the Midlands via the Mid-Wales Railway.

Harris had a series of private owner wagons built by the Gloucester Railway Carriage and Wagon Company, which considerably reduced transport costs. In later years, British Railways Class 37 locomotives rostered from Cardiff Canton and Barry depots, were placed in charge of coal hoppers on a Merry-go-round train, to transport coal to Aberthaw power station.

== Disasters ==
Due to its depth, Deep Navigation suffered various fatalities from its start of construction, with seven men dying in the six years from 1873 to 1879. But these were just 7 out of over 110 miners, who died in accidents underground at Deep Navigation between 1873 and the start of World War I in 1914.

On 12 December 1884, five men descended the No.2 South shaft in a bowk to replace some byats. Just after the winding engine commenced, the 3.5 inches (89 mm) wide braided steel flat rope broke, sending four to their deaths at the bottom of the shaft 700 yards (640 m) below. Thomas John Dobbs, who had been guiding the bowk down a guide rope, managed to slowly lowered himself to within hailing distance of pit bottom, and was rescued with nothing more than cuts and bruises. Following an accident investigation by HM Inspectorate of Mines, it was found that the rope had corroded, where it had been in contact with the headframe sheave wheel. But as the rope was covered with a protective coating of tar, the corrosion had gone undetected. The sheave wheels on both the No.1 and No.2 shafts at Deep Navigation were unusual, in that they were constructed of different parts that had been riveted together, not a singular wheel that had been cast. The sheaves were not replaced at Deep Navigation until 1961 (No.2 South), and 1963 (No.1 North).

On 11 November 1902, five men lost their lives and two others were injured in No.2 South pit. A water extraction pipe fell away from the shaft wall, crashing onto an ascending double-decker mine cage. Carrying 32 men at the time of the accident, the dead and injured were travelling in the upper deck of the cage.

== Today ==
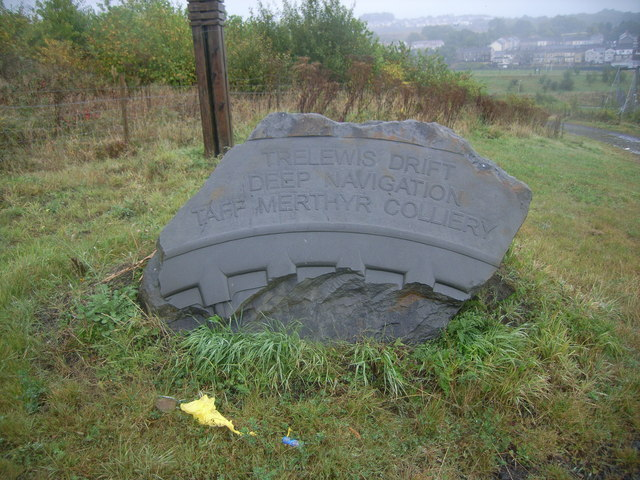
Commemorative stone at the entrance to Parc Taff Bargoed, for the three local collieries

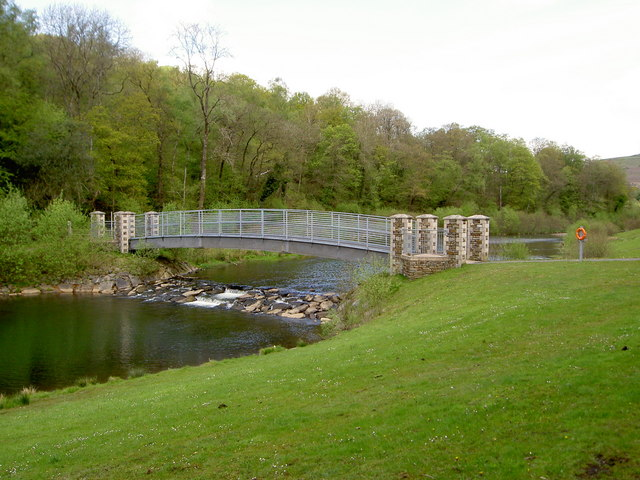
Footbridge between the two lakes in Parc Taff Bargoed. Built on the site of the former Taff Merthyr and Deep Navigation collieries, works involved moving the slag heap tips that had formerly buried the Taff Bargoed river

After all three collieries closed, the combined site was extensively redeveloped, with the former slag heaps removed. As a result, the brick tunnel in which the Taff Bargoed river had been redirected in 1873 was removed, and a landscaped parkland created either side of two new lakes. Opened in time for the Millennium, the park was named Parc Taff Bargoed, now home to many local rugby and football teams.
