= Pentwyn Deintyr =

Coordinates: 51.6466°N 3.3265°W

Pentwyn Deintyr is a hill-top hamlet in the community of Bedlinog and Trelewis, Merthyr Tydfil County Borough, south-east Wales. Ordnance Survey mapping places the centre on grid reference ST 096 962 at about 140 m above sea level, straddling the minor ridge road between Quakers Yard and Nelson. The settlement stands 900 m north of the county boundary with Caerphilly County Borough and 1.2 km east of the Taff Bargoed river; the A470 trunk road runs on the opposite valley side, giving Pentwyn Deintyr a direct road link to Merthyr Tydfil (8 km north-west) and Cardiff (28 km south-east).

The place-name is first recorded in eighteenth-century lease documents and is analysed by Owen and Morgan as Welsh pen twyn y deintyr—'summit of the tenter-hill'. A tenter was a wooden frame studded with hook-like pins used by the local cottage woollen industry to dry and stretch woven cloth; the clustering of such frames on an exposed knoll gave both topographical and occupational identity to the growing hamlet.

Pentwyn Deintyr has never formed a separate civil parish but is enumerated with Bedlinog and Trelewis ward. The 2021 Census recorded 3,767 usual residents in the 15.22 km^{2} ward, a rise of 15 per cent since 2011; housing density remains low at 247 inhabitants per km^{2}, with most dwellings lining Pentwyn Deintyr road and the steep lanes that descend to Quakers Yard.

The hamlet's best-known native is the flyweight boxer Jimmy Wilde (1892–1969), whose birth certificate and Army service record both give Pentwyn Deintyr as his birthplace. Wilde rose from pit boy to become the first official world flyweight champion and was later elected to the inaugural class of the International Boxing Hall of Fame.
