= Trelewis =

Coordinates: 51°40′03″N 3°17′48″W

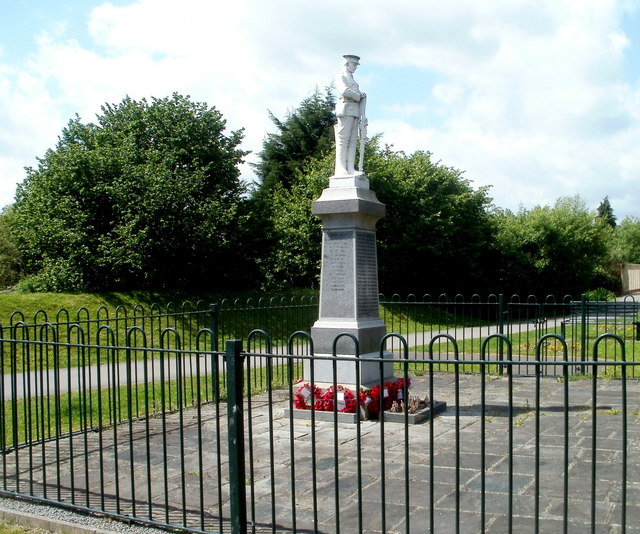
- Relocated Trelewis War Memorial

- Location within Merthyr Tydfil
- Population: 2,029
- OS grid reference: ST095975
  - Cardiff: 14 mi (23 km)
- Principal area: Merthyr Tydfil
- Preserved county: Mid Glamorgan
- Country: Wales
- Sovereign state: United Kingdom
- Post town: TREHARRIS
- Postcode district: CF46
- Dialling code: 01443
- Police: South Wales
- Fire: South Wales
- Ambulance: Welsh
- UK Parliament: Merthyr Tydfil and Aberdare
- Senedd Cymru – Welsh Parliament: Merthyr Tydfil and Rhymney

Trelewis is a small village in the Taff Bargoed Valley of south-east Wales, currently located in the southern part of Merthyr Tydfil County Borough. It is a former mining village and together with nearby Bedlinog was until 1974 part of the Gelligaer Urban District Council area of the county of Glamorgan. The villages name means 'Lewis Town' and was named after the Lewis family who owned a farm on the area where the village is now built.

== Location ==
It is around one-third of a mile (0.5 km) north of Nelson, 3 miles (4.8 km) south of Bedlinog, and around two-thirds of a mile (1.1 km) east of the Treharris, from which it is divided by the Taff Bargoed river. It lies 5 miles (8 km) north of the town of Pontypridd, 6 miles (10 km) west of Caerphilly, and 10 1/2 miles (17 km) south of Merthyr Tydfil. The village is at an altitude of 490 feet (150 m).

== Government ==
Trelewis is in the Merthyr Tydfil County Borough, which covers the villages of Trelewis and Bedlinog. The Bedlinog & Trelewis Ward is the only electoral area within the Merthyr Tydfil County Borough Council area with a Community Council. The Council was created in 1974 by the former Gelligaer Urban District Council prior to its abolition and the subsequent transfer of Trelewis and Bedlinog into the Merthyr administrative area upon local government reorganisation in that year, to which most people in Bedlinog and Trelewis were opposed.

== History and amenities ==
During the latter nineteenth century, a coal mine opened in the village which led to a large expansion of the village. In 1878 the Trelewis school opened, this was replaced in 1984 with a new modern school. There is a freight-only railway line, the Taff Bargoed branch opened in 1876 of the former Great Western Railway and Rhymney Railway, running through the village and this line carries coal from Ffos-y-fran opencast colliery. Bedlinog is to the north of Trelewis on this line, whilst Nelson is to the south.

Trelewis Welfare, a former member of the Welsh Football League, played in the village. Trelewis also has a park and an outdoor bowls club, Trelewis Welfare Outdoor Bowls which was founded in 1932, and following the closure of Treharris Bowling Club, merged in 2017 to form Trelewis & Treharris Welfare Outdoor Bowls Club.
