= Hansa Investment Company =

British investment trust

Hansa Investment Company Limited
- Type: Public limited company
- Traded as: LSE: HANA
- Industry: Investment Management
- Founded: 1912
- Headquarters: London, United Kingdom
- Key people: Jonathan Davie (Chair)
- Website: hansaicl.com

Hansa Investment Company Limited (LSE: HANA), is a large British investment trust with a globally diverse portfolio. The company is listed on the London Stock Exchange and is a constituent of the FTSE 250 Index.

== History ==
The company was established in 1912 as the Alto Paranà Development Company, in order to acquire the share capital of a forestry business operating in Brazil. Its business involved the care of 600,000 acres (240,000 ha) of cedar, pine and hardwood forest. It became the Scottish and Mercantile Investment Co Limited in 1951.

It bought a stake in a shipping business, Ocean Wilsons, in the late 1950s. It then became Finsbury Trust in 1992 and Hansa Trust in 2001.

In June 2025, it offered to acquire all the shares it did not already own in Ocean Wilsons. The takeover was completed in December 2025.
