= Bedlinog =

Village in Merthyr Tydfil, Wales

Coordinates: 51°42′08″N 3°18′45″W

- Village and community
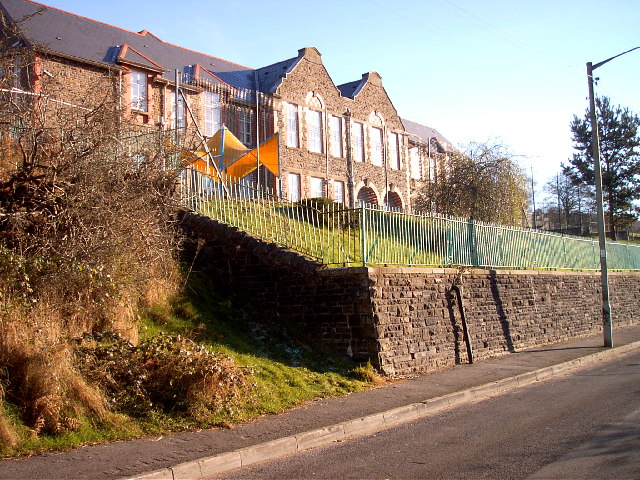
- Bedlinog School

- Location within Merthyr Tydfil
- Principal area: Merthyr Tydfil
- Country: Wales
- Sovereign state: United Kingdom
- Police: South Wales
- Fire: South Wales
- Ambulance: Welsh
- List of places UK Wales Merthyr Tydfil Map of the community

Bedlinog is a village and community located in the Taff Bargoed valley, in the south of Merthyr Tydfil County Borough, Wales. It is 10 km (6 mi) north of Pontypridd, 10 km (6 mi) north west of Caerphilly and 10 km (6 mi) south east of Merthyr Tydfil. Until 1974 it was part of Gelligaer Urban District Council in the county of Glamorgan.

== Description ==
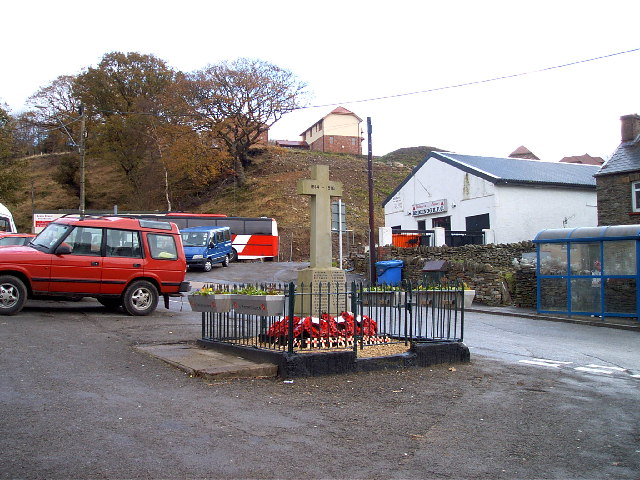
Bedlinog War Memorial

It has a population of around 1,400 people. The combined population of Bedlinog and Trelewis has been recently recorded as approximately 3,140, increasing to 3,277 at the 2011 census.

== Name ==
The meaning of the name is somewhat unclear, but the usual suggestion is that it means the 'house near (the stream) Llwynog'. If so, the first element is a variant of the Welsh 'bod' ('dwelling'), and the second a variant of the name of a stream ('Llwynog') which literally means 'fox'. However, all forms of the name are relatively late (seventeenth century onwards) and show significant variation. During the nineteenth century the name was thought by some to have been formed from the elements 'bedd' ('grave') and 'llwynog' ('fox'), and the form 'Beddllwynog' ('fox's grave') is used by some Welsh speakers today. But it is not the standard Welsh form, and it is clear that 'Bedlinog' was the predominant form used by the area's Welsh-speakers in the nineteenth and twentieth centuries.

== Government ==
Bedlinog village is in the Merthyr Tydfil County Borough, which covers the villages of Trelewis and Bedlinog, but is the only electoral ward within the Merthyr Tydfil County Borough Council area which has its own Community Council.

== Sport and leisure ==
The local rugby union club is Bedlinog RFC, founded in 1971 and a member of the Welsh Rugby Union.

One of the largest climbing centres in Europe less than a mile down the valley was closed briefly in 2008, but re-opened in October 2010.

== Arts and entertainment ==
Many films and TV productions have been filmed in Bedlinog, including the pilot episode of the 1970's TV series Porridge ('Prisoner and Escort', 1973), Karl Francis', The Angry Earth (1989), and the TV series The Indian Doctor (2012).

== Welsh language culture ==
Bedlinog is home to the Bedroc festival, a major event in the Welsh language calendar which has been held over a weekend in June every year since 2008.
