= Taff Bargoed =

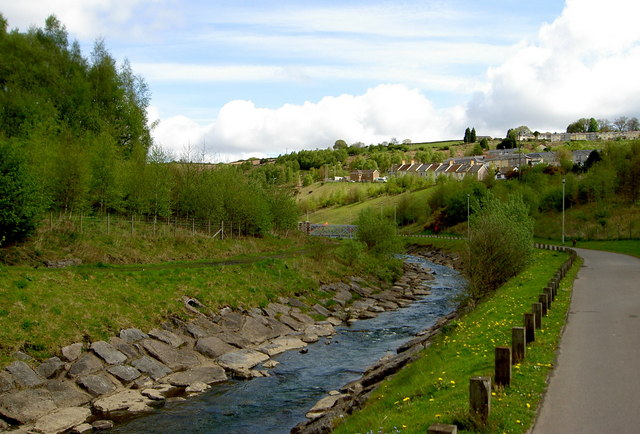

The Taff Bargoed (Welsh: Afon Taf Bargoed) is a river and valley near Pontypridd in South Wales, and lies off the Abercynon roundabout on the A470 road, and is approximately 14 miles from Cardiff. The main settlements are Nelson, Edwardsville, Quakers Yard, Treharris, Trelewis, and Bedlinog. The valley is situated where the three County Boroughs of Caerphilly, Rhondda Cynon Taff, and Merthyr Tydfil meet.

== History ==
Originally a collection of farms, from the early 1800s the valley was industrialised through coal mining, developing a rich Industrial heritage. During the Industrial Revolution the area was home to the Trelewis Drift Mine, the Taff Merthyr Colliery and the Deep Navigation collieries.

In 1886 the Rhymney Railway opened the Taff Bargoed Line up the valley, serving Bedlinog railway station and Cwm Bargoed railway station. Passenger services ended in 1964, but the line remained open for coal trains, later serving the Ffos-y-fran Land Reclamation Scheme.

The coal mines closed in the 1980s, and since then the valley has been extensively redeveloped. The culvert through which the river used to run has been blocked off and the river allowed to flow naturally. Two lakes were built and areas were set aside with weirs for canoeing. Paths and bridleways were made linking Treharris and Trelewis and the site of the former Trelewis Drift Mine was converted into the Taff Bargoed Centre with the help of a grant from the Millennium Commission, and became the Welsh International Indoor Climbing Centre. This has one of the biggest climbing walls in the United Kingdom.

Parc Taf Bargoed is a regenerated area of parkland in Merthyr Tydfil County Borough and is a Green Flag Park. It is situated in the Taff Bargoed Valley between Trelewis, Treharris and Bedlinog. The former colliery site has been regenerated as a wildlife haven and a base for community activities. The pavilion, at the park gates, houses the warden and provides visitors with information on the history of the park and the wildlife to be found in the area. The building also provides space for community meetings and events and walking, cycling and horse riding is encouraged in the park. The Aberfan Canoe Club and the Parc Taff Bargoed Anglers Club meet here and periodically there are canoeing, kayaking and raft building activities.
