= Quakers Yard =

Coordinates: 51.6603°N 3.3113°W

Quakers Yard: Welsh: Mynwent y Crynwyr
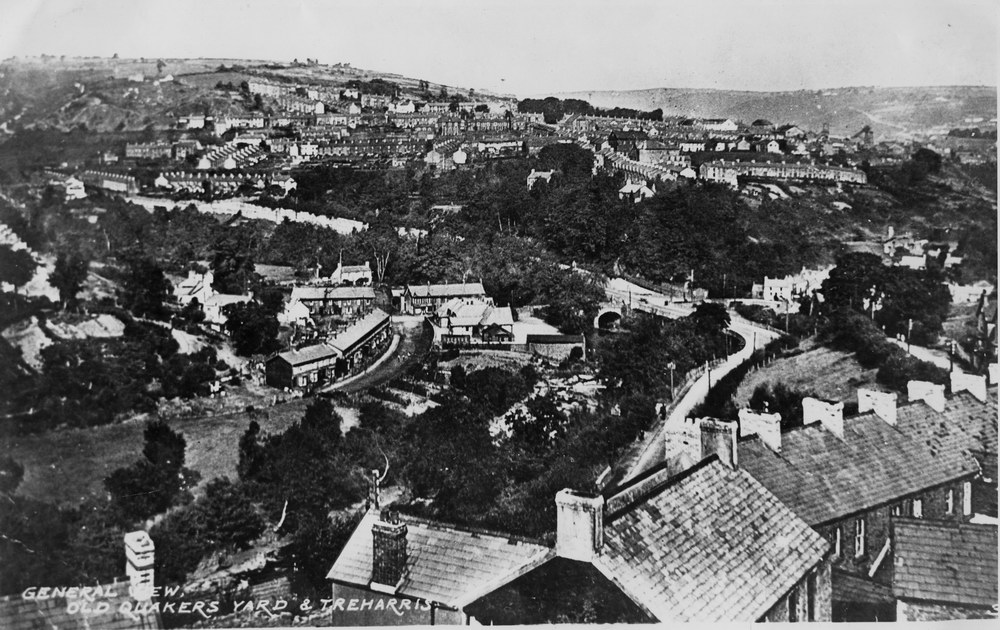

- Location within Merthyr Tydfil
- OS grid reference: ST093965
- Community: Treharris
- Principal area: Merthyr Tydfil
- Preserved county: Mid Glamorgan
- Country: Wales
- Sovereign state: United Kingdom
- Post town: Treharris
- Postcode district: CF46
- Dialling code: 01443
- Police: South Wales
- Fire: South Wales
- Ambulance: Welsh
- UK Parliament: Merthyr Tydfil and Aberdare
- Senedd Cymru – Welsh Parliament: Merthyr Tydfil and Rhymney

Quakers Yard or Quaker's Yard (Welsh: Mynwent y Crynwyr) is a village in the Merthyr Tydfil County Borough, situated where the Taff Bargoed Valley joins the Taff Valley. The settlement is part of the community of Treharris.

== History ==
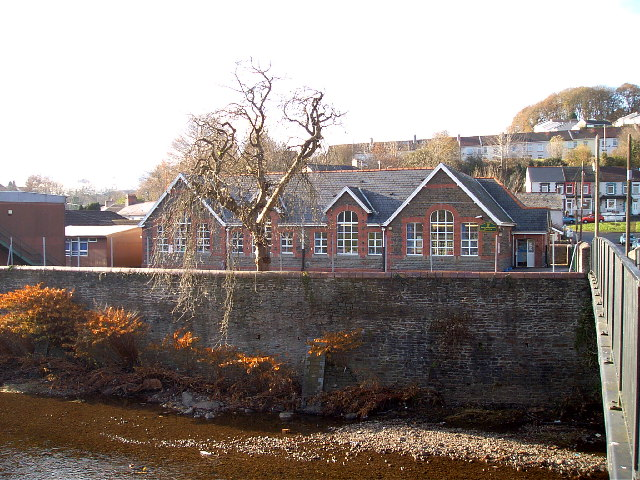
Ysgol Rhyd Y Grug

The early place name for the district was 'Rhyd y Grug' or 'The Ford of the Rustling Waters'. This ford was a simple and easy crossing place of the nearby River Taff, close to its junction with the smaller Taff Bargoed river. The ford was replaced in later years by the narrow stone bridge over the River Taff. Quakers Yard railway station opened in 1858.

During the early 17th century those who 'dissented' from the King's Religion were persecuted. This often took the form of imprisonment, or death. By about 1650 a 'dissenting group' of Baptists, independents and Quakers were worshipping at nearby Berthlwyd Farm, Pentwyn (Top of the Hill). The Quakers in turn, soon broke away to establish their own separate community. In the year 1667, these Quakers opened their own Quaker burial ground. It was on a piece of land on the Pantannas Estate and was owned by Mary Chapman. In her will of 1700, she left the burial ground to the Quakers. However, this burial ground was very small as the Quakers did not want to draw attention to it. To find this burial ground now is even harder as a new road in Quakers Yard was built through this site.

== Notable people ==
The Jacobite David Morgan, executed for his part in the Jacobite rising of 1745, lived at the farm of Penygraig on the hillside north of Edwardsville.

One of the most famous British boxers of all time, Jimmy Wilde (1892–1969) was born at Pentwyn Deintyr, Quakers Yard. Known as 'The ghost with the Hammer in his hand', he fought 864 contests and lost on 4 occasions only. He was Flyweight Champion of the World (Universal) from 1916 to 1921.

Andrew Coombs was born in Merthyr Tydfil and resided in Quakers Yard. He won 10 full international rugby caps between 2013 and 2014, and also captained the Newport Gwent Dragons region. After retirement from rugby he became a rugby pundit with S4C and BBC Television.

== Schools ==
The primary school Ysgol Gymraeg Gynradd Rhyd y Grug was located in the village until pupils were relocated to Aberfan. The redundant school buildings near the confluence of the rivers in Quakers Yard have been demolished.

== Railways ==
Quakers Yard station is located on the Merthyr Line in Treharris. The station was opened as "Quakers Yard Low Level" by the Taff Vale Railway in 1858.
