= Quakers Yard railway station =

Railway station in Merthyr Tydfil, Wales

Quakers Yard Welsh: Mynwent y Crynwyr
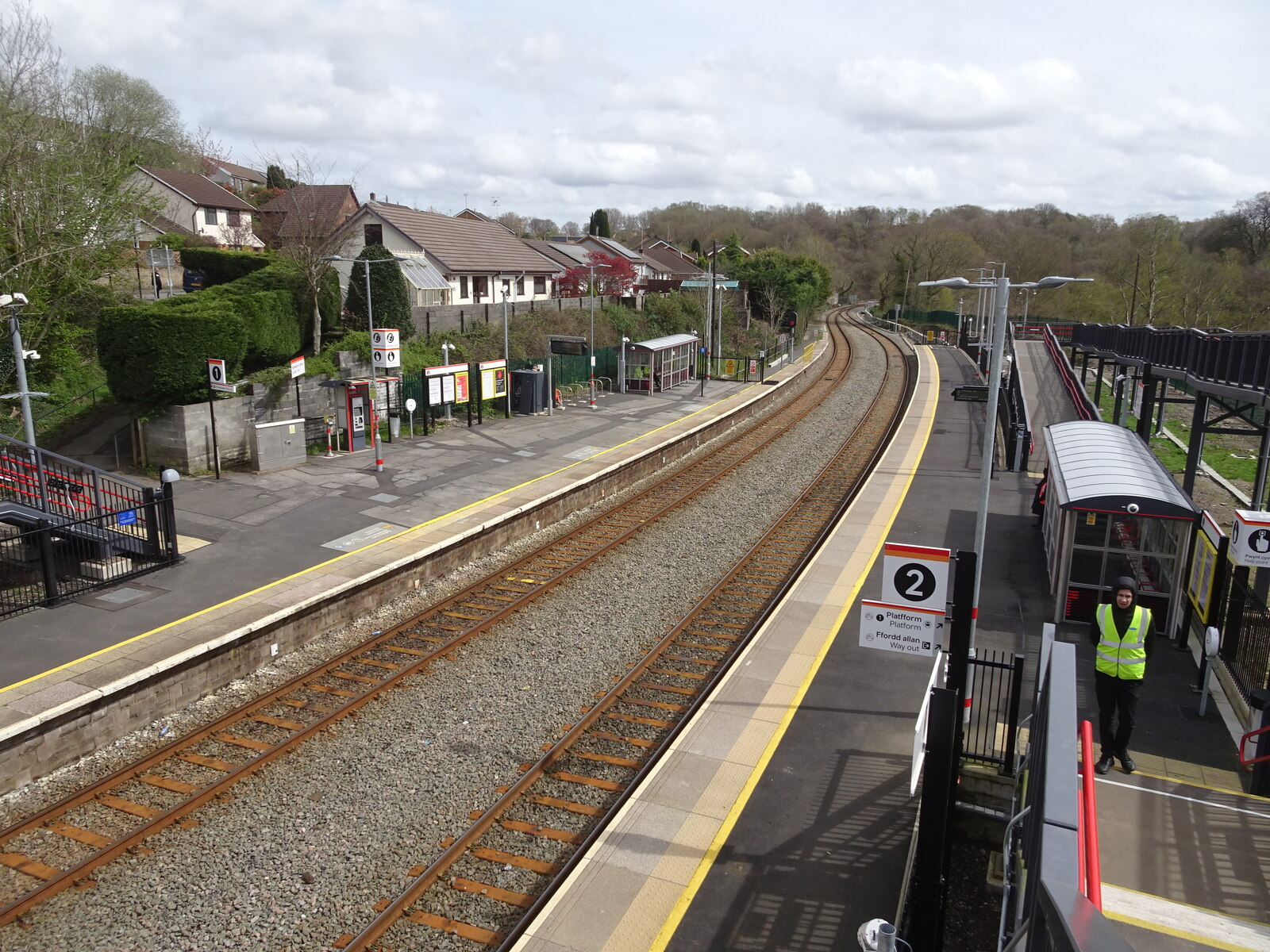
- Quakers Yard railway station in 2024

General information
- Location: Quakers Yard, Treharris, Merthyr Tydfil; Wales
- Coordinates: 51.6604°N 3.3231°W
- Grid reference: ST085965
- Managed by: Transport for Wales
- Platforms: 2

Other information
- Station code: QYD
- Classification: DfT category F2

Key dates
- 5 January 1858: Opened

Passengers
- 2020/21: ▼10,764
- 2021/22: ▲36,174
- 2022/23: ▲38,238
- 2023/24: ▼19,908
- 2024/25: ▲53,228
Location
Notes
- Passenger statistics from the Office of Rail and Road

Quakers Yard railway station serves the village of Edwardsville in the community of Treharris, Merthyr Tydfil, Wales. It is located on the Merthyr Tydfil branch of the Merthyr Line. Passenger services are provided by Transport for Wales.

== History ==
The station was opened as Quakers Yard Low Level by the Taff Vale Railway in 1858.

Isambard Kingdom Brunel built the Goitre Coed Viaduct, which was opened in 1841; its height is approximately 100 ft. The viaduct was widened in 1862, with another stone bridge of slightly differing design sitting embedded next to the original one; this addition can easily be spotted when passing underneath the viaducts arches on the Taff Trail cycle route 8. This viaduct still exists as the gateway to the Taff Valley for the Cardiff to Merthyr Tydfil railway line. In a TV appearance, a Brunel expert put the Goitre Coed Viaduct as the finest example of Brunel's viaducts in Wales.

Two more viaducts existed at the north end of Edwardsville, which were demolished shortly after the Beeching cuts of the 1960s. The main reason for their demolition was subsidence and the viaducts had been strengthened with huge wooden supports for a number of years.

Until June 1964, when the adjacent Vale of Neath Railway High Level station was closed, along with the Pontypool Road to Neath line that passed through it; this was a large, two-level junction with services to numerous locations and a hub through which large amounts of coal were transported. The line from Abercynon to Merthyr Tydfil is now a single line operation; the dual track was removed in the early 1970s, although some dual track has since been brought back at Merthyr Vale running towards Merthyr Tydfil to help with the increased frequency of services.

== Location ==
The station is situated below the Taff Vale estate, where bespoke detached properties have been built on the high level line area, and also on the incline that existed from the lower level which ran towards Treharris. The derelict upper level was partitioned when the Taff Vale estate was built. The land to the east below Edwardsville cemetery was earmarked for business units, but was eventually sold to Bailey Homes house builders; the estate is named Forest Grove and mainly detached houses were built. A small senior citizen sheltered bungalow complex buffers this site with the Taff Vale site.

Quakers Yard station provides access to and from the Taff Trail cycle route. The beauty spot at Pontygwaith Bridge, over the River Taff, lies about a mile north on the trail. Arriva Trains Wales allowed cyclists on local trains with some restrictions on timing. Access to the trail is via a foot crossing over the railway line, a short distance north of the railway platform.

This section of the Taff Trail includes the original stone sleepers from Edwardsville towards Pontygwaith and beyond towards Mount Pleasant, where Richard Trevithick ran the first ever steam locomotive to run on rails and the first to carry passengers in 1804.

== Services ==
Trains run every half-hour each way: north to Merthyr Tydfil and south to Pontypridd & Cardiff Central. On Sundays, there is an hourly service each way to Merthyr and Cardiff Central.

Preceding station	National Rail	Following station
Abercynon	Transport for Wales; Merthyr Line	Merthyr Vale

== Edwardsville ==
Edwardsville is the name given to the small urban area that grew up around Quakers Yard station. The railway pre-dated the villages of both Edwardsville and Treharris. (Note: Treharris, lit. 'Harris' town' in Welsh takes its name from Harris's Navigation Pits, which were sunk in 1872.) Although not close to Quakers Yard village, this was the only local placename of any note at the time. (Note: Quakers Yard's placename dates from around 1700)

The Edwardsville area began as a public house and a few houses on the road along the valley to Merthyr. The Great Western Hotel still exists just above the station, with strong links to the railways obvious by its name. In around 1900, the area acquired its name from the landlord of this pub, Edmund Edwards.

Mrs C M Williams of Grove House, Edwardsville, wrote:

My late father, Mr A Clarke, was in the meeting held in the Long Room of the Great Western Hotel when Edwardsville was given its name. It was called this after the late Mr Edmund Edwards, who was chairman of the meeting and the proprietor of the Great Western Hotel. He later became the owner of many properties.

The suffix ‘-ville’ was popular for new placenames around this time, particularly those largely built by speculative builders or landlords. It suggested both a pastoral ‘village’ and also a then-fashionably French aspect of 'ville' (town). Edwardsville expanded on both sides of the road and soon had a board school and chapel.

On 27 October 1913, much destruction was caused in Edwardsville when it was hit by a tornado. The roofs of many houses, the school and chapel were destroyed. Three people were killed and over a hundred injured. Damage was caused over a wide area, with chimneys also demolished as far down the valley as Pontypridd. This toll remains Britain's highest for a tornado.

Recently, Edwardsville has expanded below the main road, with new houses filling the space of the previous high-level station.

Edwardsville is part of the Treharris community, as is Quakers Yard. Boosted by the pit, Treharris has grown to be larger than both.
