= Gelligaer Urban District Council election results, 1909–1939 =

Local election results in Wales

Gelligaer Urban District Council was a local authority in Glamorgan, Wales. It was created in 1908 under the provisions of the 1894 Local Government of England and Wales Act and reflected the population increase in the upper Rhymney Valley. The Council existed until 1973. There were five wards.

The first councillors were elected on 30 September 1908. Most of the first members of the authority had served on the previous Rural District Council.

== 1908 Gelligaer Urban District council election ==
=== Fochriw Ward ===
Fochriw Ward 1908
Party	Candidate	Votes	%	±%
Labour	John Edwards*	283		
Liberal	John Jones*	215		
Liberal	Rhys Jenkins	175		
Liberal	Thomas Kinsey	139		

=== Hengoed Ward ===
Hengoed Ward 1908
Party	Candidate	Votes	%	±%
Liberal	Dr John Richards	258		
Conservative	Rev T.J. Jones	180		
Liberal	Edward Richards	163		
Conservative	Sydney Jones	139		
Liberal	W. Coslett Beddoe	102		
	Gerald W. M'Arthur	17		

=== Pontlottyn Ward ===
Pontlottyn Ward 1908
Party	Candidate	Votes	%	±%
Liberal	Ben Hughes	355		
Conservative	Rev T. Rees*	307		
Liberal	D. Hopkins*	304		
Conservative	W.A. Morgan*	269		
Liberal	Stephen Evans	181		

=== Tirphil Ward ===
Tirphil Ward 1908
Party	Candidate	Votes	%	±%
Labour	William Hammond*	225		
Liberal	Rees Davies	220		
Labour	Joseph Morgan	206		
Liberal	J. Aurelius*	135		
