= Treharris =

Town in Merthyr Tydfil, Wales

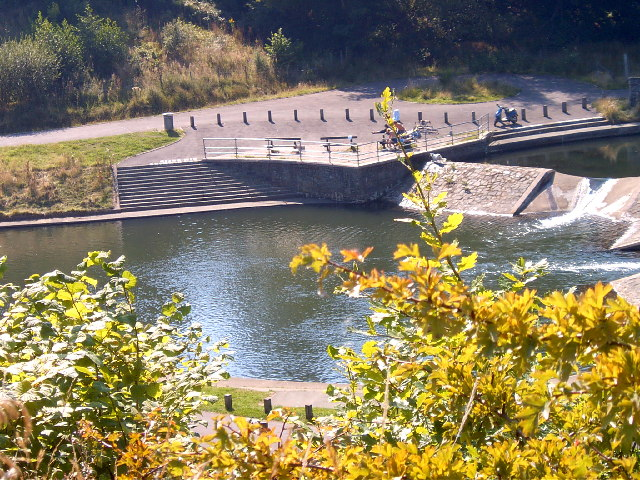
- Canoe weirs at Millennium Park

- Location within Merthyr Tydfil
- Population: 6,356 (2011)
- OS grid reference: ST095975
- Community: Treharris
- Principal area: Merthyr Tydfil
- Preserved county: Mid Glamorgan
- Country: Wales
- Sovereign state: United Kingdom
- Post town: TREHARRIS
- Postcode district: CF46
- Dialling code: 01443
- Police: South Wales
- Fire: South Wales
- Ambulance: Welsh
- UK Parliament: Merthyr Tydfil and Aberdare
- Senedd Cymru – Welsh Parliament: Merthyr Tydfil and Rhymney
- List of places UK Wales Merthyr Tydfil 51.6689°N 3.3100°W Map of the community

Treharris is a town and community (and electoral ward) in the Taff Bargoed Valley in the south of Merthyr Tydfil County Borough, South Wales. It is located about 0.6 miles (1.0 km) west of Trelewis, from which it is separated by the Taff Bargoed river, and 0.9 miles (1.4 km) from Nelson in Caerphilly county borough and has a population of 6,356 from the 2011 Census. As a community, Treharris includes the villages of Quakers Yard and Edwardsville. Due to steepness and narrowness of both the Taff and Taff Bargoed valleys at Treharris several notable bridges and viaducts have been built in the area.

== History ==
The town was formed around Harris's Deep Navigation Colliery, which begun coal mining excavations in 1878, after sinking started in 1872. The colliery and village were named after F. W. Harris and his Harris Navigation Steam Coal Company. Originally known as Harris's Navigation Pits, the Deep Navigation shafts were the deepest at the time in South Wales. With the some shafts sunk to a depth of 760 yards (2,280 feet, 695 metres) to access the Nine Feet Seam, 200 yards (600 feet, 183 metres) deeper than any other colliery in the coalfield. Ownership transferred to the Ocean Coal Co. Ltd. in 1893 - so called because the pit supplied the coal for the transatlantic ocean liners, including the Cunard Line. The pit became known as Deep Navigation Colliery and remained in production until 1991.

During the early 21st century, like many ex-mining villages in the area, Treharris underwent significant regeneration to the town/village centre. Most, if not all of the land where Deep Navigation was situated has been landscaped and is now part of the new Parc Taff Bargoed, where many of the local football and rugby teams train and play.

== Governance ==
Treharris is also the name of an electoral ward whose boundaries are coterminous with the community. The Treharris ward elects three county councillors to Merthyr Tydfil County Borough Council. Since 1995 the ward has elected a mixture of Labour Party or Independent councillors. In May 2017 the Labour Party won all three seats.

== Sport and leisure ==
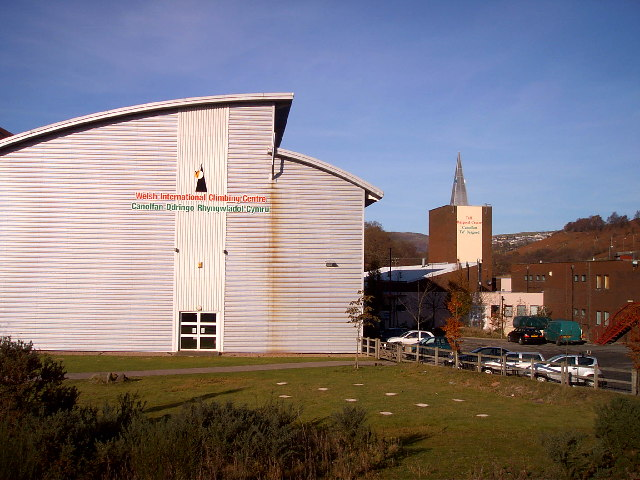
Welsh International Climbing Centre

The Welsh International Climbing Centre, an indoor climbing centre and caving complex, is built on the site of the former Trelewis Drift mine and is an integral part of the Millennium park complex.

Treharris has the oldest Boys and Girls club in the whole of the United Kingdom.

Treharris Athletic Western F.C. is the local football (soccer) team, once winners of the Western League in 1910, who now play their trade in the Welsh Football League.

Valley Cougars are an amateur Rugby league that play their home games at Treharris Rugby Club they play in Rugby Leagues 4th tier, the Conference League South

Treharris Mini and Junior Rugby Football Club was founded in 1994. The continued success of this club paved the way for the re-introduction of senior and youth rugby in 2009. Treharris Rugby is represented at senior level by Treharris Phoenix who compete in the WRU/SWALEC Leagues. Treharris Youth compete in the Welsh Rugby Union RAF Youth League.

== Transport ==
Treharris is served by Quakers Yard railway station, on the Merthyr Line between Cardiff Central and Merthyr Tydfil.

== Arts & entertainment ==
The sketch "The Worm That Turned", from the BBC series The Two Ronnies, was filmed around Treharris.

The 1972 film Sunstruck starring Harry Secombe was partly filmed in the two the villages of Treharris and Trelewis. The Welsh school featured, Webster Street School, has now been demolished for housing.

The television drama Richard Burton's A Christmas Story was filmed around Treharris in 1990.

== Notable people ==
See Category:People from Treharris

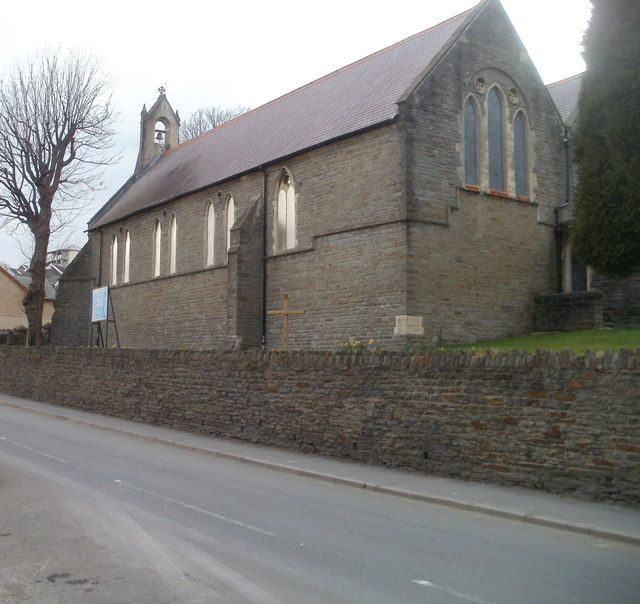
St Matthias's Church

- Lloyd Daniels, X-Factor finalist
- David Davies, Welsh international footballer
- Ivor Davies, artist

== Bibliography ==
- Davies, John; Jenkins, Nigel (2008). The Welsh Academy Encyclopaedia of Wales. Cardiff: University of Wales Press. ISBN 978-0-7083-1953-6.
- Thomas, Dr. W. Gerwyn (1979). Welsh Coal Mines. Cardiff: National Museum of Wales. ISBN 0-7200-0059-9.
