= Taff Merthyr =

Formerly active Welsh coal mine

Coordinates: 51°40′55″N 3°17′52″W

Taff Merthyr was a deep navigation colliery in South Wales.
