= Tornadoes in the United Kingdom =

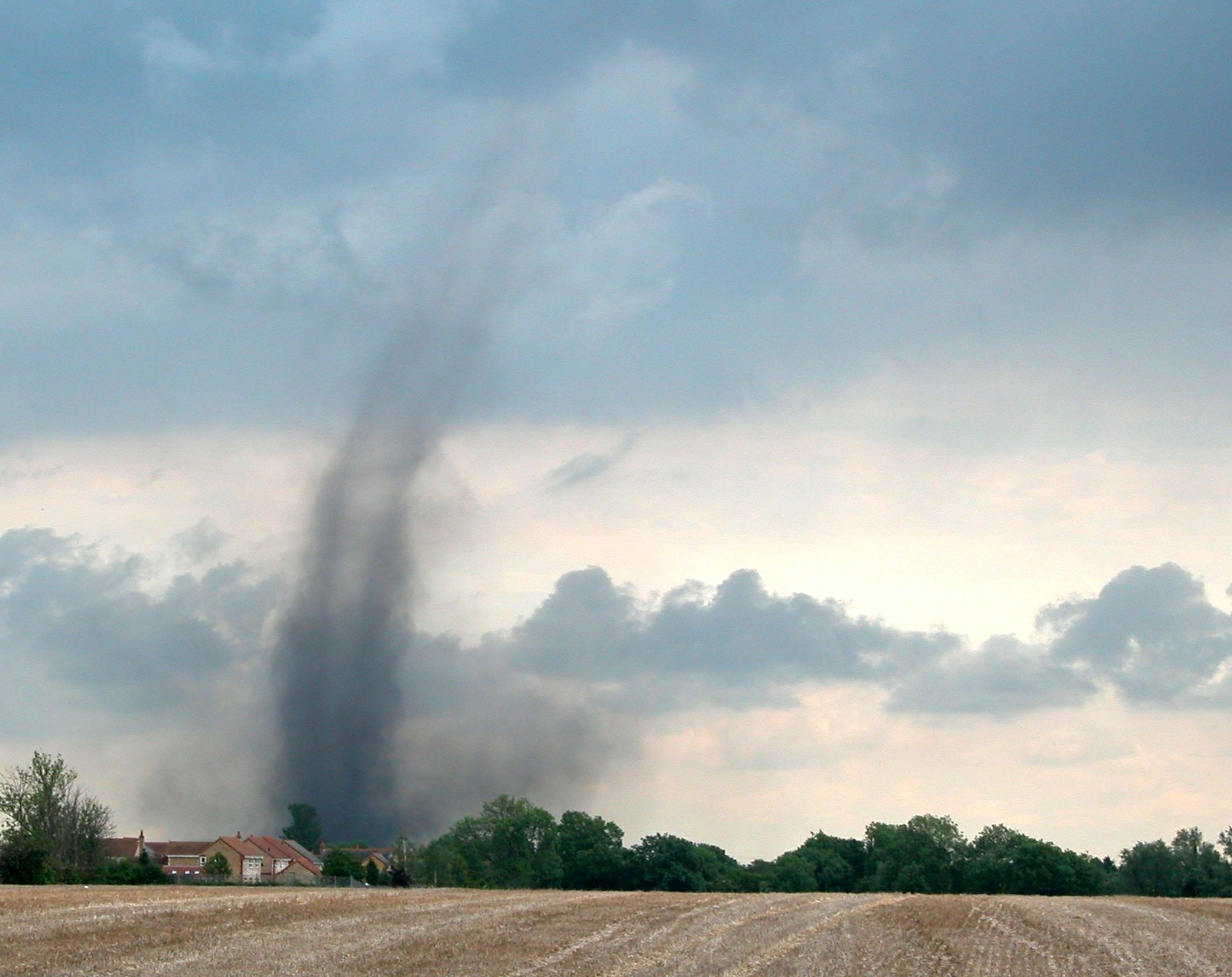
A tornado near Little Thetford, Cambridgeshire, in May 2005.

The United Kingdom experiences more tornadoes than any other country in the world relative to its land area, however most tornadoes are relatively weak and rarely cause casualties or significant damage. The last "strong" tornado, one rated between T4 and T7 (F2 to F3), was a T5 which struck Greater Manchester on 27 December 2023.

== Climatology ==
The United Kingdom experiences more tornadoes than any other country in the world relative to its land area, a statistic first realised in 1973 by Japanese-American meteorologist Ted Fujita, who invented the Fujita scale. Despite holding this position, the country only has an average of 36.5 tornadoes annually, much lower than the United States' annual average of over 800. Furthermore, tornadoes in the UK often cause minimal damage and are very rarely fatal, with only 49 tornado deaths on record.

The Tornado and Storm Research Organisation (TORRO) is the UK's main organisation for tornado research and maintains an extensive database of tornadoes in the country. Founded in 1974 by meteorologist Terence Meaden, TORRO has grown to have around 400 members and carries out a number of activities including data collection, site investigations and research. The organisation uses the T-Scale, which was first proposed in 1972, to rate a tornado's intensity rather than the Fujita scale commonly used in other places.

== Records ==
The Tornado and Storm Research Organisation has kept track of tornadoes in the United Kingdom and Europe, and keeps record of many extremes.

- The earliest known tornado in the UK was a T8 on 17 October 1091.
- The earliest known waterspout in the UK, which is also the earliest known in all of Europe, occurred in June 1233 off southern England.
- The longest-track tornado in the UK was a T3 on 19 August 1881 which travelled 32 kilometres (20 mi) from Upton, Lincolnshire, to Elsham, Lincolnshire.
- The widest tornado track in the UK was a T3 on 7 January 1998 in Selsey, which reached a width of 900 m (3,000 ft).
- The most intense tornado in the UK was a T8-9 which passed through Lincolnshire on 23 October 1666.
- The deadliest tornado in the UK was a T7 on 27 October 1913 which killed 5 people in Abercynon and Edwardsville, Wales.
- The largest tornado outbreak in the UK and the world (outside the US) was on 23 November 1981, where 104 tornadoes were spawned within 5.25 hours.
- The costliest tornado in the UK was the 2005 Birmingham tornado, which caused £40 million of damage, equivalent to £71 million in 2025.

== Events ==
=== 1091 London tornado ===
1091 London tornado
Meteorological history
- Date: 17 October 1091

F4 tornado
- on the Fujita scale

T8 tornado
- on the TORRO scale

Overall effects
- Fatalities: 2
- Areas affected: Greater London

On 17 October 1091, the earliest known tornado in the UK hit London, which had a population of under 20,000 at the time. The city's buildings were constructed mostly of wood, so the tornado, which has been rated T8 on the TORRO scale (equivalent to F4 on the Fujita scale), destroyed many of them with ease. Many structures were destroyed, including London Bridge, over 600 houses and many churches. The Church of St Mary-le-Bow was hit, killing two people inside it and lifting the roof into the air, with six of the 28-foot (8.5 m) timbers being fixed into the ground so deep that only about 4 ft (1.2 m) protruded.

=== 1558 Nottingham tornado ===
1558 Nottingham tornado
Meteorological history
- Date: 17 or 21 July 1558

T7 tornado
- on the TORRO scale

Overall effects
- Fatalities: 6-7
- Areas affected: Nottinghamshire

On 17 or 21 July 1558, an estimated T7 tornado hit Sneinton, a village less than a mile from Nottingham, where at least six people were killed. As described in Holinshed's Chronicles, the tornado destroyed houses and churches in two towns, throwing bells outside of churchyards and carrying sheets of lead 400 ft (120 m) into a field. The water and mud from the River Trent was carried a quarter mile and thrown against trees, and trees were uprooted and carried 'twelve score'. A child was taken carried 100 ft (30 m) high and dropped, breaking his arm and killing him, whilst five or six other men nearby were also killed.

=== 1666 Lincolnshire tornado ===
1666 Lincolnshire tornado
Meteorological history
- Date: 23 October 1666

F4 tornado
- on the Fujita scale

T9 tornado
- on the TORRO scale
- Max width: 200 m (660 ft)
- Path length: 7 km (4.3 mi)

Overall effects
- Fatalities: 3
- Areas affected: Lincolnshire

On 23 October 1666, the most intense tornado in the UK, which was rated at T8/9, hit the villages of Boothby Graffoe, Navenby, Welbourn and Wellingore in Lincolnshire. In 1749, Thomas Short described the tornado in his book A General Chronological History of the Air, Weather, Seasons, Meteors, &c. in Sundry Places and different Times. He said that in Welbourn it "levelled most of the houses to the ground, broke down some, and tore up other trees by the roots, scattering abroad much corn and hay". He also said a boy was killed before it hit Wellingore, where the tornado "overthrew some houses, and killed two children in them". Short continued, saying it "touched the skirts of Na[ve]nby, and ruined a few houses" before it hit Boothby Graffoe. There, he said it "dashed the church steeple in pieces, furiously rent the church itself, both stone and timber work, [and] left little of either standing, only the body of the steeple". He went on to say the tornado "threw down many trees and houses" before "it moved in a channel, not in great breadth". Short said it had "ruined a great part of that country" and that "it went through Nottinghamshire, where the hail-stones were nine inches about". He said "the whirlwind was about 60 yards broad" and that "on Nottingham Forest it brake down, and tore up at least 1000 trees, overthrew many wind-mills, overset boats on the Trent: And in a village of 50 houses, it left only 7 standing." A more recent report described some of the damage along the tornado's 7 km (4.3 mi) track: in Welbourn 44 houses were demolished; in Wellingore and Navenby many houses were demolished; and in Boothby Graffoe the church was partly destroyed and many houses were demolished.

=== 1810 Portsmouth tornado ===
1810 Portsmouth tornado
Meteorological history
- Date: 14 December 1810

F4 tornado
- on the Fujita scale

T8 tornado
- on the TORRO scale

Overall effects
- Areas affected: Hampshire

On 14 December 1810, a short-lived tornado rated T8, equivalent to an F4, struck Old Portsmouth in Hampshire, causing 'immense' damage. The Gentleman's Magazine reported that four houses on Southsea Common were levelled, with many others being so badly damaged that they had to be demolished, as well as 30 others being unroofed. Chimneys were blown down at Haslar Hospital and the Marine Barracks and the Government House and its Chapel were partly unroofed. Over 100 panes of glass were smashed in houses facing Grand Parade and the lead on a bank roof was "rolled up like a piece of canvas and blown from its situation".

=== 1810 Diss tornado ===
1810 Diss tornado
Meteorological history
- Date: 18 December 1810

TU tornado
- on the TORRO scale

Overall effects
- Injuries: 2
- Areas affected: Norfolk

On 18 December 1810, a tornado hit Diss where it tore up trees and unroofed houses. As the tornado passed over Diss Common it overturned a post-chaise coach and dashed it to pieces, injuring two of its occupants.

=== 1840 Reading tornado ===
1840 Reading tornado
Meteorological history
- Date: 24 March 1840

T5 tornado
- on the TORRO scale

Overall effects
- Fatalities: 1
- Injuries: 1+
- Areas affected: Berkshire

On 24 March 1840 a T5 tornado hit Reading railway station, just six days before it opened, where a man was killed. As the tornado was sighted coming along the railway track, a timekeeper was lifted and thrown against the bank and a 40-tonne (44-ton) railway engine was derailed. Coal which had been sucked out of the train's tender was flung in all directions, with one piece shattering a second timekeeper's collarbone. As the tornado reached the station itself, Henry West, a carpenter who was working on the station's roof, was killed after he was jammed into the space between two joints shortly before the 4-tonne (4.4-ton) framework of the roof was ripped off and carried 70 m (230 ft), with his body found 100 m (330 ft) further down the line.

=== 1870 ===
FU	F0	F1	F2	F3	F4	F5	Total
3	1	10	4	0	0	0	18

On 19 October 1870, at least 18 tornadoes touched down in England and Wales. Four of these were rated T4 and ten were rated between T2 and T3. Some of the worst affected areas were Cowes, Kingsbridge and Westbury-sub-Mendip, where T4 tornadoes felled many trees and badly damaged numerous roofs.

=== 1876 Cowes tornado ===
1876 Cowes tornado
- Damage to the Globe Hotel following the tornado

Meteorological history
- Date: 26 September 1876

F3 tornado
- on the Fujita scale

T7 tornado
- on the TORRO scale

Overall effects
- Fatalities: 1
- Injuries: 5+
- Damage: £15,000 (equivalent to £1,496,454 in 2025)
- Areas affected: Isle of Wight and Hampshire

At around 7 a.m. on 28 September 1876, a tornado rated F3 struck Cowes on the Isle of Wight causing significant damage. After hitting Cowes, the tornado became a waterspout as it crossed The Solent before making landfall again in Hampshire, where a man was killed and a boy badly injured in Meonstoke; several people suffered injuries like broken limbs on Cowes.

The tornado first appeared as a waterspout off the coast of Brook which dissipated upon reaching land before reforming near Cowes. It is thought to have begun in Brixton at 7:15 a.m. where it destroyed outbuildings before moving on to Cowes, where it caused significant damage. The Globe Hotel was described as a 'ruin', with its front completely blown in and bedrooms exposed, and the neighbouring cottage was 'similarly demolished'; a Swedish captain who was asleep in the hotel at the time suffered a broken ankle, but the other occupants escaped unharmed. A cottage's iron railing was twisted and a nearby iron lamppost had been snapped, and a girl was lifted 15 ft (4.6 m) into the air on High Street before landing unharmed. Many boats were damaged and lifted, with one fisherman having his boat turned upon him. The Royal Pier's buildings were levelled, leading to its removal in 1882, and the Royal Pier Hotel suffered significant damage. The police station had all its windows and part of its walls blown in, as well as a two hundredweight of sheet lead lodged in its front parlour. Broken walls, crumbling chimeys and stripped roofs could be seen in all directions, and almost every window in the Catholic Chapel was broken. A slate was driven 6 in (150 mm) deep into a wooden windowsill, and the engine house at the terminus of the Cowes and Newport Railway, a large wooden building, was wrecked, with four heavy carriages blown onto their sides and the water tank smashed upon an engine. Scaffolding and brickwork at the then new Victoria Road Chapel was blown over and several hundred feet of the reservoir's parapet wall was knocked over. In the countryside, many large trees were uprooted, fences and hedges swept away, stacks overturned, barns raised and cottages renered uninhabitable after losing their roofs. Three men were injured at Broadfield's farm after being crushed beneath a collapsing barn, and as the tornado continued to tear through the countryside it left a cottage demolished with just a staircase left standing. In Cowes, the damage was estimated to be around £12,000 (equivalent to £1,197,163 in 2025).

As the tornado crossed The Solent it dropped debris on a yacht which was more than 1 km (0.62 mi) offshore, with a brick hitting its forecastle deck. It made landfall again between Titchfield and Portsmouth in Hampshire about 5 mi (8.0 km) from Cowes. Crops like turnips were torn out of the ground and oak trees at Southwick Park near Fareham were uprooted before the tornado caused significant damage to farms and homesteads in Meonstoke, where a man was killed and a boy injured. A farmhouse had all of its windows blown out and a barn was lifted bodily with a man inside it before it was converted into a heap of ruins; the man remarkably escaped. After wreaking havoc in Meonstoke, the tornado continued into the countryside and carried sheaves of wheat 500 ft (150 m) onto a hill as it tore a 100 ft (30 m) wide path through a thick copse, where it continued to uproot trees and underwood. The corners of ricks and cottages were described as being "cut off as if with a knife", iron troughs were carried 300–400 yd (270–370 m), and gates were thrown into adjacent fields after being lifted off their hinges.

=== 1913 Glamorgan tornado ===
1913 Glamorgan tornado
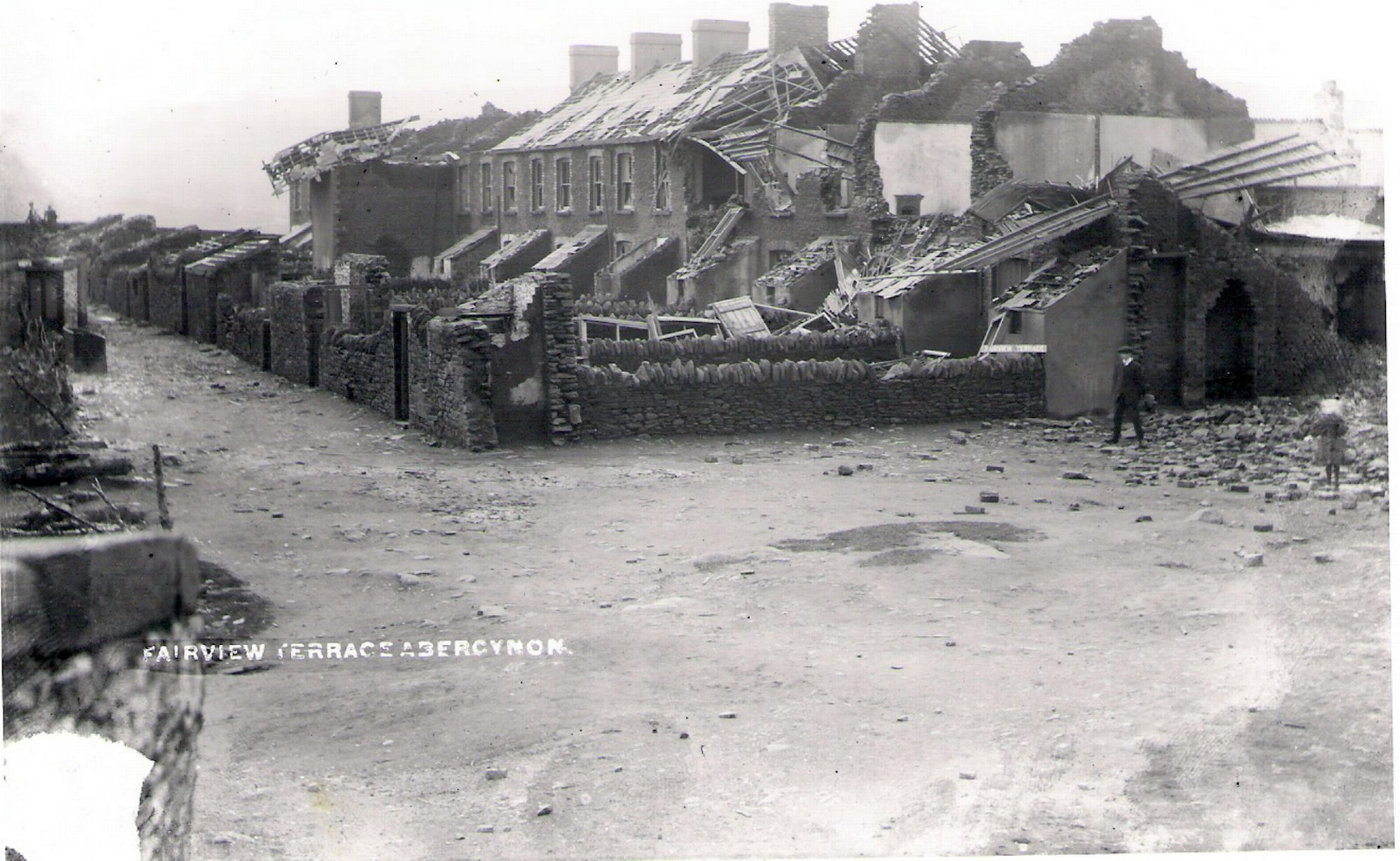
- Damage caused by the tornado in Abercynon

Meteorological history
- Date: 27 October 1913

F3 tornado
- on the Fujita scale

T7 tornado
- on the TORRO scale
- Max width: 300 m (980 ft)
- Path length: 12 mi (19 km)

Overall effects
- Fatalities: 5
- Damage: £100,000 (equivalent to £9,976,360 in 2025)
- Areas affected: Mid Glamorgan

During a tornado outbreak on 27 October 1913, an F3 tornado touched down in Mid Glamorgan, Wales, and travelled north for 12 mi (19 km). The tornado had a track width of up to 300 m (980 ft) and caused extreme damage, with churches and chapels reportedly "razed to the ground" and houses "utterly demolished", as well as five deaths and many injuries, making it the deadliest on record in the UK.

The tornado started near Duffryn Dowlais, where it damaged outhouses before moving on to Llantwit Fardre where it uprooted trees and damaged houses. It blew out the side of a generating station in Treforest before hitting Cilfynydd at a width of around 200 m (660 ft). Here damage was severe: iron sheets torn from a shop's roof were carried roughly 1 km (0.62 mi) and wrapped around a telegraph pole; chimneys were toppled; houses were unroofed; and the chapel's roof was thrown onto the pastor's neighbouring house. At Abercynon, a tree was thrown 80 m (260 ft), a row of houses had their roofs and joists totally ripped off and a street was almost entirely demolished, with many of the residents being injured. Damage was most severe in Edwardsville, where a chapel wrecked as the tornado reached 300 m (980 ft) in width. In neighbouring Treharris, the cemetery chapel was destroyed, tombstones torn out of the ground, the congregational chapel unroofed, the post office wrecked and several people injured by falling debris. One of the people killed was footballer for Ton Pentre F.C. Francis Woolford, who was lifted and thrown against a wall 20 ft (6.1 m) away, fracturing his skull and killing him; another man was killed after being carried over 200 yd (180 m) before being dropped. In several villages, whole streets were reportedly destroyed, with houses unroofed and walls "carried away". At least 150 families were temporarily homeless and the tornado caused as much as £100,000 in damage, equivalent to £9,976,360 in 2025. In total, this tornado killed at least five people: two in Abercynon and three in Edwardsville.

=== 1923 Solihull tornado ===
1923 Solihull tornado
Meteorological history
- Date: 24 October 1923
- Duration: 4 minutes

T3 tornado
- on the TORRO scale
- Max width: 50 yd (46 m)
- Path length: 2.5 mi (4.0 km)

Overall effects
- Fatalities: 1
- Injuries: 2
- Areas affected: West Midlands

On 24 October 1923, a T3 tornado tore through Solihull, killing one man and badly injuring two others. It was first spotted above some trees in Shirley and made landfall at Sharmans Cross before it dissipated at Elmdon Heath. Three men who were working on a new road took shelter in a barn at Silhill Hall which had its roof lifted before it crashed upon them, killing one of them and badly injuring the other two. Along its 50-yard (46 m) wide path, chimneys and roofs were destroyed, trees uprooted, telegraph wires brought down and walls demolished. A hayrick was lifted from a field onto a road and a wall which bounded the grounds of The Hermitage was demolished. The tornado lasted for four minutes and tracked for 2.5 mi (4.0 km).

=== 1931 Birmingham tornado ===
1931 Birmingham tornado
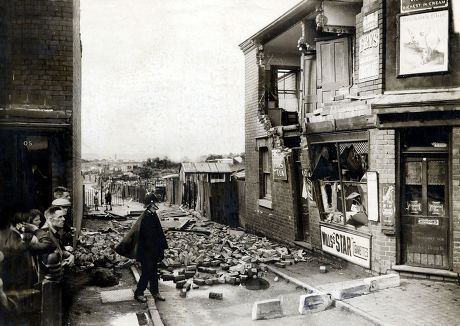
- A damaged shop following the tornado

Meteorological history
- Date: 14 June 1931

T6 tornado
- on the TORRO scale
- Max width: 800 m (2,600 ft)
- Path length: 9 km (5.6 mi)

Overall effects
- Fatalities: 1
- Injuries: 9
- Areas affected: West Midlands

At 4 p.m. on 14 June 1931, a tornado rated T6 struck east Birmingham, killing one person and badly injuring nine others as it carved a 9 km (5.6 mi) path from Hall Green to Erdington. The tornado began in southeast Birmingham at Hall Green before moving north, following the course of the River Cole and growing wider as it passed through Greet, Sparkhill and Sparkbrook, eventually reaching peak intensity at Small Heath. With an intensity of T6, wind speeds were 259–299 km/h (161–186 mph) as the track widended to 800 m (2,600 ft). A 61-year-old woman was killed when a brick wall which she was sheltered against collapsed upon her. Greenhouses at Small Heath Park were wrecked and hundreds of trees uprooted as hundreds of children took shelter in the park's refreshment room, which was luckily unharmed by the tornado. Hundreds of houses in Small Heath were unroofed, with many losing their top floor, before the tornado turned northeast to hit Bordesley Green and Washwood Heath, where large trees were uprooted, houses unroofed and cars overturned. The sky was 'filled with a cloud of corrugated iron sheets, slates and chimney pots' in Washwood Heath, and the window which a witness watched from was sucked out as the tornado passed. As it approached Erdington the tornado continued to lose strength, narrowing as it continued to uproot trees before dissipating soon after.

=== 1937 Kelseys tornado ===
1937 Kelseys tornado
- The joiner's shop in South Kelsey following the tornado

Meteorological history
- Date: 25 October 1937

T7 tornado
- on the TORRO scale

Overall effects
- Areas affected: Lincolnshire

On 25 October 1937, a strong tornado struck the district of West Lindsey, causing significant damage in South Kelsey and North Kelsey. The damage in South Kelsey, where two brick buildings were demolished, was described as "at least force T6, and probably T7". A contemporary report from the Lincolnshire Echo described the tornado as "like a bomb" and detailed the damage it caused: unroofed houses, uprooted trees, a damaged church and broken windows.

In North Kelsey, poultry houses were blown away, outhouses destroyed, fences broken and windows smashed. One resident estimated her loss to be £50, equivalent to £2,945 in 2025. The Methodist Chapel in North Kelsey was badly damaged, with chunks of stone at its entrance being "plucked out" and many roof tiles being stripped, with a chimney "blown halfway down the roof". A large chicken run was lifted over the chapel roof and deposited in pieces 150 yd (140 m) away. A "good-sized" tree in the village was uprooted. A large tree has its top "twisted off as one would twist the top off a carrot". The roof of North Kelsey Manor House was "spiked by spars of wood sticking up in all directions" and had many of its tiles stripped.

In South Kelsey, a joiner's shop described as a strong brick building was "razed to the ground". Two men working there narrowly escaped injury when the roof collapsed upon them: due to a side door they avoided being crushed, however a motorcycle in the shop was broken. A 5-horsepower (3.7 kW) table saw in the shop was "broken to pieces" and stock and tools were buried in the debris. A resident said they saw a poplar tree "go flying past, whirled by the wind as easily as a piece of paper". A chicken hut was blown down a yard and destroyed. Another resident said she saw hay bundles, wheat sheaves and furniture, including a table, being carried through the air. Telegraph poles were blown over, severing the connection between Grimsby and South Kelsey. The whirlwind was described as leaving "a trail of broken chicken houses", with "whole hayricks scattered over the road" between the two villages.

After causing severe damage in the Kelseys, the tornado continued to the hamlet of Howsham, where a resident described the air as looking like it was "full of birds" before continuing to say "it was not birds, but flying tiles, fragments of stacks and other wreckage caught up by the wind". The force here was far weaker, with an outhouse roof stripped of tiles. Heavy rain following the storm worsened damage in the Kelseys as water poured through holes in the roofs of homes. Across its 5 mi (8.0 km) track, the tornado caused no injuries, a feat described as "miraculous" by contemporary newspaper reports.

=== 1950 Buckinghamshire tornado ===
1950 Buckinghamshire tornado
- The tornado approaching RAF Halton

Meteorological history
- Date: 21 May 1950
- Duration: 4 hours

T6+ tornado
- on the TORRO scale
- Path length: 200 km (120 mi)

Overall effects
- Damage: £50,000 (equivalent to £1,479,996 in 2025)
- Areas affected: East of England

On 21 May 1950, a T6 tornado affected parts of Bedfordshire, Buckinghamshire, Cambridgeshire, Hertfordshire, Norfolk and Suffolk. The tornado was the subject of the Met Office's 99th Geophysical Memoir, published in 1957. It estimated damage to be over £50,000, with damages exceeding £25,000 in Linslade alone. The worst affected areas were Linslade and Leighton Buzzard, Wendover and Aston Clinton, the outskirts of Bedford, and Sutton. It lifted from the ground multiple times during its course, which caused the most damage along a 12 mi (19 km) track from Wendover to Leighton Buzzard where it experienced seven or eight regenerations within 40 minutes. The tornado didn't kill anyone, however some animals were killed, including two cows hit by flying sheets of corrugated iron and over 500 chickens.

Linslade following the tornado

The tornado touched down shortly before 4 p.m. near Little London and tracked through the Missenden valley, where it uprooted a few trees and lifted the roof from a cowshed. Its force began to strengthen once it reached the valley's opening towards the Vale of Aylesbury before approaching Wendover. Many large elm and walnut trees were felled as the path widened to 50 yd (46 m) before narrowing again as it passed over the town, where it lifted roofs and raised a column of water from the Wendover Arm Canal. A witness near Wendover compared it to The Wizard of Oz, with bits of building spinning around the top. After briefly weakening, the tornado reached Halton, where a power station's roof was lifted before it damaged buildings and trees in Aston Clinton, where a school was unroofed. Moving on to Puttenham after lifting once or twice, a well-built brick barn was demolished, a Nissen hut was destroyed and a large barn supported by iron girders was twisted up, with bales of hay inside thrown out; part of its corrugated iron roof was found in a tree 100 yd (91 m) away. In the area surrounding Ascott House and Wing, big trees were felled and vehicles in farms were lifted. One witness reported that the tornado had broken into multiple funnels here, which merged close to Linslade. Damage was at its worst here: the majority of houses on two streets were either unroofed or badly damaged; outbuildings were demolished; a heavy roof was carried away; vehicles including a horsebox were lifted and thrown in the railway station's car park; and a brick bakery was demolished. It lifted multiple times in the Leighton Buzzard area, depositing debris in and near the River Ouzel as it lowered again at random points. Buildings, greenhouses and orchards were struck near Heath and Reach and two cows were killed at a nearby farm. After this the tornado briefly lifted before uprooting some trees then lifting again. For several miles no damage was done although the funnel cloud could still be seen consistently. The next damage was in south east Bedford, where roof tiles were lifted, fences overturned and trees uprooted. The tornado's force gradually increased until it reached Fenlake, where large trees were carried across the River Great Ouse, some of which blocked it. Willow trees along the river's banks were felled as it moved towards Castle Mills Lock, however after this point it weakened and lifted off the ground again. The next damage was at Wyboston, were a few roof tiles were removed from a chapel, before the tornado lifted again for 15 mi (24 km). Its energy began to increase near St Ives and the funnel cloud was seen working downwards again near Earith. Damage resumed at Sutton: roofs were lifted; a house's wall sucked out; an orchard uprooted; a 10–20 yd (9.1–18.3 m) wide gap carved through a forest; large oak trees uprooted and twisted off at their trunks; and a double-decker bus overturned. After this the tornado caused no more significant damage, although dozens of vortices were observed at RAF Feltwell and a funnel cloud was observed in Shipdham, Binham and Blakeney before it dissipated off the coast of Norfolk soon after 8 p.m.

=== 1954 Gunnersbury tornado ===
1954 Gunnersbury tornado
Meteorological history
- Date: 8 December 1954

T7 tornado
- on the TORRO scale
- Path length: 19 km (12 mi)

Overall effects
- Injuries: 38
- Areas affected: Greater London

On 8 December 1954, a T7 tornado swept through West London, where it damaged many houses and caused numerous injuries. It first hit Chiswick, where houses were damaged on Thames Road, Oxford Gardens and Strand-on-the-Green, before the roof collapsed at the Britvic Works causing boxes of glass bottles to be thrown around, causing six people to be taken to Brentford Hospital. It then hit Gunnersbury station causing significant damage, including a collecting hut being blown away and the station's iron roof collapsing, burying 15 people, eight of whom were taken to West Middlesex Hospital. Others outside the station were knocked unconscious after being hit by flying bricks. The damage caused the station to close for rebuilding, and the railway line was blocked. A garage's roof was blown onto a bowling green on Chiswick High Road before the tornado crossed the Gunnersbury Triangle and hit the Royal Standard Laundry, causing its 80 ft (24 m) high chimney to collapse and crash through the roof. The tornado went on to South Acton, where it caused damage to the majority of houses on Antrobus Road, Bollo Lane, Cunnington Street, Ivy Crescent, Kingswood Road, Montgomery Road, Rothschild Road and Temple Road. On Rothschild Road, five houses and a factory were seriously damaged; on Antrobus Road, the entire top floor of a detached house was blown away; and at least three people were injured. A children's playground on Southfield Road was destroyed, and a lead factory on Mansell Road was completely wrecked. A man was slightly injured on Birkbeck Grove when a chimney crashed through his roof, and properties in Acton Vale suffered significant damage, including a house being split in half and the top floor of another being demolished. A shop was almost entirely destroyed, a whole floor collapsed in the Central Middlesex Hospital and many trees in Acton Park were lost. Houses were damaged in Muirfield and the East Acton Estate, a bus was slightly lifted on Du Cane Road, a shop was seriously damaged on Erconwald Street and a lorry was crushed by bricks, injuring two men. The tornado regained some force as it crossed Wormwood Scrubs before blocking railway lines with debris at Willesden Junction and injuring five people. 300 houses were damaged in the area south of King Edward VII Park and seven people were taken to hospital before the tornado struck near Willesden Green station, where two tons of brickwork fell from a three storey building and six more were injured. Despite the widespread destruction and intensity of the tornado, no one was killed and only around 30 people were kept in hospital.

=== 1966 ===
FU	F0	F1	F2	F3	F4	F5	Total
26	0	0	0	0	0	0	26

Two tornado outbreaks occurred in Britain during 1966: one on 15 November and another on 1 December. They spawned 13 tornadoes each and damage from them totalled £50,000 (equivalent to £813,293 in 2025). The worst damage from the first outbreak was in Leicester, where hundreds of homes were damaged and 24 people injured when a well-built school building partially collapsed. The places which received the most damage from the second outbreak were Biggleswade, Bridgwater and Gamlingay.

=== Nov 1981 ===
FU	F0	F1	F2	F3	F4	F5	Total
5	32	64	3	0	0	0	104

On 23 November 1981, England and Wales were struck by the largest tornado outbreak ever recorded in Europe, with 104 confirmed tornadoes. This outbreak also produced the eighth-most tornadoes in a single 24-hour period internationally and is the largest on record outside of North America. Despite the large number of tornadoes, its effects were minimal as the majority of tornadoes were rated T0 to T3, however there were three T4 tornadoes.

A T4 struck the town of Holyhead in Anglesey: 20 properties were badly damaged. A section of Holyhead County School's roof was torn off and eight homes on Station Street were badly damaged, with windows sucked out and chimneys brought down. In the neraby Penrhosfeilw area, a mobile home was overturned and destroyed, a coal bunker lid was thrown into the air and broken in half and a van was "tossed in the air". Another T4 in Stoneleigh, Warwickshire, overturned 20 mobile homes. No one was killed in the outbreak, although eight people were injured.

=== 1982 Bicester tornado ===
1982 Bicester tornado
Meteorological history
- Date: 21 September 1982

T6 tornado
- on the TORRO scale
- Max width: 100 m (330 ft)
- Path length: 1.2 km (0.75 mi)

Overall effects
- Injuries: 1+
- Areas affected: Oxfordshire

On 21 September 1982, Bicester was struck by a T6 tornado associated with ex-tropical storm Debby. The 1.2 km (0.75 mi) and up to 100 m (330 ft) wide track began 700 m (2,300 ft) northeast of the town centre, with the first damage taking place in a residential area where eight properties lost roof tiles and tree branches were snapped. Two industrial estates followed, where a brick wall in the Launton Industrial Estate fell upon a sheltering family who received treatment for minor injuries. An Oxfam warehouse's roof was lifted, its leeward wall bowed outwards by 13 in (330 mm) and its windward corner collapsed, with 60 staff members being evacuated. The adjacent warehouse only lost some of its guttering whilst two smaller buildings opposite them suffered extensive damage, including both of their roofs being lifted by 26 in (660 mm) and one of their roofs being stripped of its felt. Another building had one of its windows sucked out, a heavy lorry trailer was lifted and carried over a fence and an engineering workshop's steel-girder roof was lifted to an adjacent building's higher roof before being thrown against another building. Several large steel-framed aluminium doors were warped, one of which was carried across the road before striking a factory's roof and landing in a field. A 2 m (6 ft 7 in) high brick wall and concrete posts holding a boundary fence were pushed over, the former crushing a parked car. After the tornado wreaked havoc at Launton Industrial Estate it moved on to Telford Road Estate, where it caused damage limited to minor roof damage and wooden sheds being "blown about".

=== 1989 Long Stratton tornado ===
1989 Long Stratton tornado
Meteorological history
- Date: 14 December 1989

T4 tornado
- on the TORRO scale
- Path length: >5 km (3.1 mi)

Overall effects
- Injuries: 1
- Areas affected: Norfolk

On 14 December 1989, a tornado hit Long Stratton at 13:40 GMT where it damaged as many as 100 buildings, about 50 of them seriously, including a workshop which had its roof ripped off and front wall destroyed. Other damage included toppled chimneys, broken windows, roof tiles removed, advertising signs and cables torn down and dozens of damaged cars. An elderly woman suffered head and leg injuries after she was blown over and struck by flying debris. Other damage was reported in the villages of Wacton and Great Moulton, suggesting the tornado had a track of at least 5 km (3.1 mi). Near Wacton, two greenhouses and the walls of an under construction farmhouse were demolished, and two barns were damaged with their concrete beams thrown to the ground, one of which landed on a caravan. An ash tree was uprooted and felled in Great Moulton. The tornado, which was rated as T4, is thought to have formed sometime between 13:30 and 13:40 before it travelled through Great Moulton and Wacton before reaching Long Stratton at 13:40.

=== 1998 Selsey tornado ===
1998 Selsey tornado
Meteorological history
- Date: 7 January 1998

T3 tornado
- on the TORRO scale
- Max width: 900 m (3,000 ft)
- Path length: 3 km (1.9 mi)

Overall effects
- Injuries: 2
- Damage: £10 million (equivalent to £19,410,365 in 2025)
- Areas affected: West Sussex

On 7 January 1998, a waterspout made landfall at 23:39 GMT on the western side of Selsey Bill in West Sussex. The tornado moved eastwards through the town of Selsey for 3 km (1.9 mi), where it caused up to £10 million in damage to around 1000 properties and left two people hospitalised. The tornado destroyed six caravans and an amusement arcade at Bunn Leisure and destroyed two garages and two brick walls on Saddle Lane. Medmerry County Primary School suffered significant damage and the chainlink fencing around the Crablands tennis courts were blown over. The majority of houses on Gainsborough Drive, Orpen Place and Romney Garth were damaged and a roof was torn off a block of four garage units, as well as eight garages being demolished. Eight garages on Elm Tree Close were damaged, with the roof flipped into neigbouring gardens, and three 8 ft (2.4 m) wooden stakes were hurled through the front wall of a house on The Close with such force that a large radiator held by three brackets was removed from the wall. A 40 ft (12 m) conifer tree with roots buried a metre under the concrete pavement was uprooted, and a total of 558 calls were made to emergency services, of which 409 were from different properties. The tornado was rated T3 and had a maximum width of 900 m (3,000 ft).

=== 2004 Corfe Castle tornado ===
2004 Corfe Castle tornado
Meteorological history
- Date: 28 October 2004

T2 tornado
- on the TORRO scale
- Path length: 1.5 mi (2.4 km)

Overall effects
- Fatalities: 1
- Injuries: 1
- Areas affected: Dorset

On 28 October 2004 at around 15:25, a T2 tornado struck Corfe Castle whilst a family were walking to the railway station. The top of a large pine tree was torn off and fell onto the three of them, killing 57-year-old Pamela Hudson and injuring her husband. In TORRO's annual review, published in the International Journal of Meteorology, her death was described as the first from a tornado in the UK since an incident in Widnes in 1943. Along its narrow track, which was 1.5 mi (2.4 km) in length, the tornado snapped and uprooted trees, toppled a chimney, sucked out the cavity wall insulation from a home, damaged roofs and tore down power lines, leaving the village without electricity.

=== 2005 Dunham Park tornado ===
2005 Dunham Park tornado
Meteorological history
- Date: 1 January 2005
- Duration: 15 minutes

T4 tornado
- on the TORRO scale
- Path length: 10 km (6.2 mi)

Overall effects
- Fatalities: 1
- Injuries: 3
- Areas affected: Cheshire and Greater Manchester

On 1 January 2005, a tornado rated T3/4 tracked 10 km (6.2 mi) from Lymm in Cheshire to Altrincham in Greater Manchester, killing a young boy and injuring several others. It began near Oxheys Farm, where buildings and trees were damaged, then made its way to Lymm where plant shelters and two large greenhouses were destroyed and further damage caused to fences and trees. Homes suffered roof damage in Agden and Little Bollington before the tornado reached Dunham Park, where it felled many trees; a family was hit by a pair of falling trees, killing an eight-year-old boy and injuring three others. The tornado then caused further damage to trees in Altrincham before dissipating.

=== 2005 Birmingham tornado ===
2005 Birmingham tornado
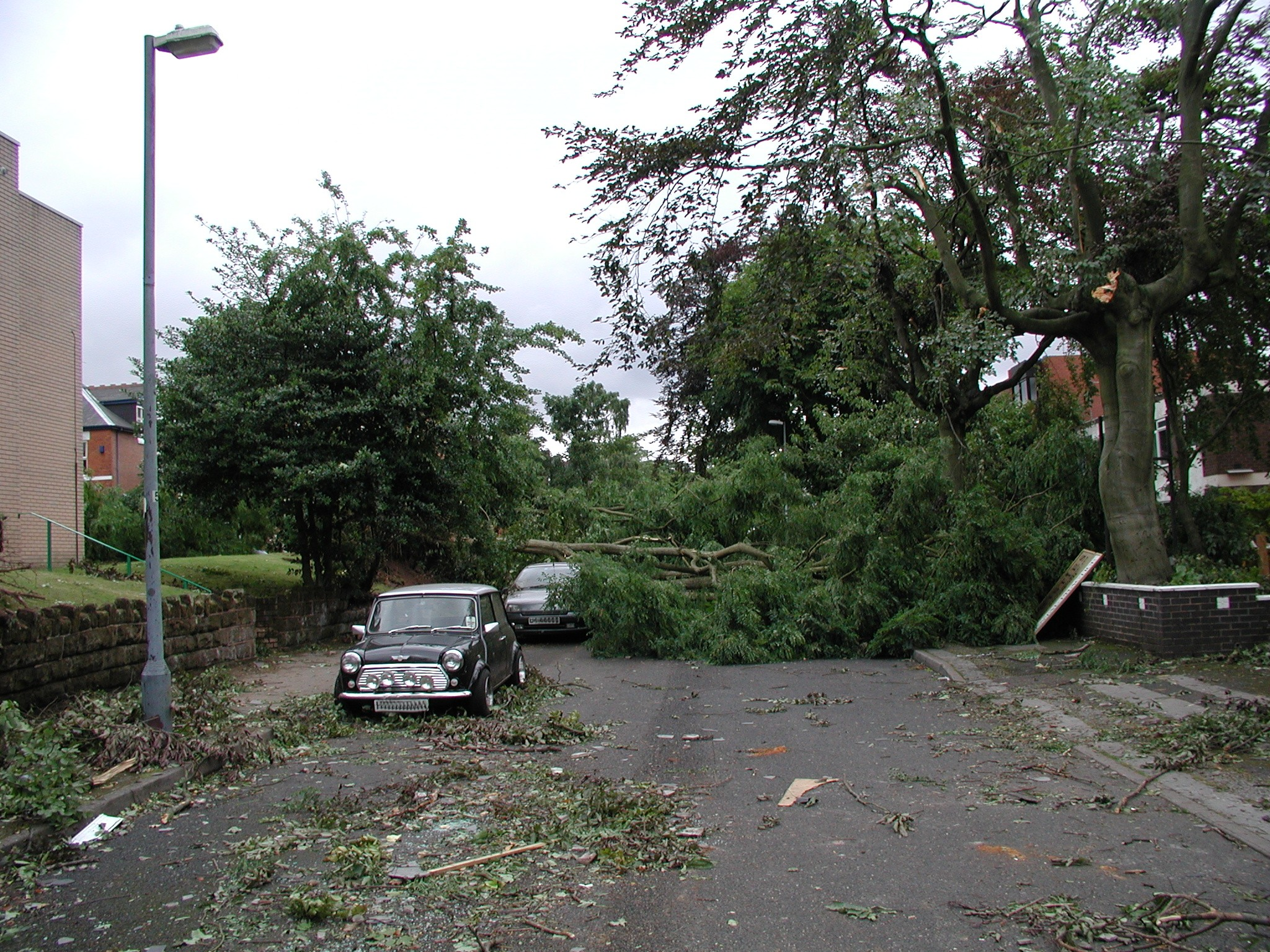
- Damage following the tornado

Meteorological history
- Date: 28 July 2005
- Duration: 20 minutes

IF3 tornado
- on the International Fujita scale

T6 tornado
- on the TORRO scale
- Max width: 500 m (1,600 ft)
- Path length: 11.7 km (7.3 mi)

Overall effects
- Injuries: 39
- Damage: £40 million (equivalent to £70,736,956 in 2025)
- Areas affected: West Midlands

On 28 July 2005 at around 14:30, a tornado struck Birmingham and had a track length of 11.7 kilometres (7.3 mi) from Kings Heath to Erdington. The tornado was rated T6 (IF3) on the TORRO scale and had a maximum track width of 500 m (1,600 ft). The tornado began south of the city center, where it caused sporadic roof and tree damage around the M42 motorway, and progressed to Kings Heath where the first significant damage occurred. A supermarket's windows were broken and a roof was partially displaced there before the tornado continued, paralleling Ladypool Road. It then struck Sparkbrook, where dozens of buildings were unroofed, small trucks tipped over and small cars flipped and rolled. Christ Church was badly damaged and was subsequently demolished, St Agatha's Church was slightly damaged, and the adjacent Ladypool Primary School suffered extensive damage, with its distinctive 30 m (98 ft) Martin & Chamberlain tower blowing over and crashing through the building's roof. Damage in this area was rated EF2 and maximum three-second winds were estimated to be 50–60 m/s (110–130 mph; 180–220 km/h). After the tornado had passed Sparkbrook it hit an industrial area, removing or damaging numerous metal and corrugated asbestos roofs before it weakened as it crossed the M6 motorway. Roughly 300 buildings were damaged and 39 people injured, three seriously, in the most intense tornado in the area since 1931. It caused £40 million of damage, equivalent to £71 million in 2025, as it passed 4,400 homes and 617 businesses.

=== 2006 London tornado ===
2006 London tornado
Meteorological history
- Date: 7 December 2006

T5 tornado
- on the TORRO scale
- Max width: 200 m (660 ft)
- Path length: 2.5 km (1.6 mi)

Overall effects
- Injuries: 6
- Areas affected: Greater London

A T5 tornado struck Kensal Rise in north west London on 7 December 2006. Its track, which reached a maximum width of 200 m (660 ft), was 2.5 km (1.6 mi) long and covered an area of 0.23 km^{2} (0.089 sq mi). Six people were injured, one seriously, and over 100 homes were damaged, 34 of which were initially surveyed as uninhabitable.

=== 2022 ===
FU	F0	F1	F2	F3	F4	F5	Total
0	1	3	1	0	0	0	5

On 23 October 2022, multiple tornadoes were spawned across Western Europe by Storm Béatrice, affecting parts of Hampshire and London as well as Belgium and France. A total of 14 tornadoes were spawned, including five in the United Kingdom and an EF3 which tracked 206 km (128 mi) from northern France to Belgium.

A waterspout came ashore in Hampshire and reached T4 strength as it tracked from Barton on Sea to Lyndhurst. It reached a maximum width of 300 m (980 ft) along its 15 km (9.3 mi) track. The most severe damage this tornado caused was at a farm near New Milton: a brick wall collapsed; metal sheeting and wooden rafters were lifted from a barn roof; many barns had their roof sheeting torn off; a telegraph pole was snapped in half; and a propane tank exploded after a gas line was hit by a dog kennel. Elsewhere in Hampshire, a T1 tornado tracked 2 km (1.2 mi) near Timsbury and a T3 tornado tracked 24 km (15 mi) from Ashley to Hurstbourne Priors. The latter tornado caused significant damage near Up Somborne: trees were snapped; branches embedded into the ground; a glasshouse destroyed; a polytunnel lifted and twisted; chicken coops destroyed; and an orchard ruined. Another T3 tracked 3.75 km (2.33 mi) and affected Marwell Zoo, where signs were snapped, lamp posts bent, trees downed and a car's windscreen smashed; two equestrian properties close to the zoo also suffered damage, with a block of four stables being lifted and thrown into a riding arena, destroying fencing and dressage mirrors. The final tornado of this outbreak struck Welling in Greater London, reaching T2 strength across a 2 km (1.2 mi) path where roofs and trees were damaged.

=== 2023 Jersey tornado ===
2023 Jersey tornado
Meteorological history
- Date: 1-2 November 2023
- Duration: 15 minutes

T6 tornado
- on the TORRO scale
- Max width: 550 m (1,800 ft)
- Path length: 8 km (5.0 mi)

Overall effects
- Injuries: 3
- Areas affected: Jersey

During Storm Ciarán, a T6 tornado hit Jersey causing widespread damage across its 8 km (5.0 mi) path, which had a maxiumum width of 550 m (1,800 ft). It traversed the entire island, making landfall late on 1 November 2023 at St Clement and exiting around Fliquet not long after midnight. TORRO determined the tornado to be stronger than the 2005 Birmingham tornado, and was likely the strongest since the 1954 Gunnersbury tornado. A beachside home in St Clement suffered damage to the upper floor, lost its roof and had walls felled, indicating T5. At FB Fields, damage to the Geoff Reed Table Tennis Centre, including partial roof loss and 100 kg (220 lb) wooden beams being carried 150 m (490 ft) across the playing field, indicated T6. Further damage in the area which indicated T5 included a folded lamppost, a recycling bank rolled 40 m (130 ft) and onto a car, and a collapsed internal wall. At the Rue des Près Trading Estate in St Saviour, warehouses suffered substantial damage (one building had its roof and courses of bricks missing - indicating T5) with many buildings partially or totally losing their roofs. Metal sheeting from the warehouses was found in many locations along the track up to 1.4 km (0.87 mi) away. Near Grouville F.C., the southern end of a single storey property collapsed, with a concrete lump from it travelling 35 m (115 ft) and through the roof of another house, indicating T6. Part of a flat roof from this area landed in tennis courts 150 m (490 ft) away and a car was found upright 25 m (82 ft) away from where it was parked, having landed on its roof at some point, both indicating T4. A property on Rue Saint Julien suffered T3-5 damage, including flattened trees, a folded communications mast, roof damage and roof loss, collapsed and damaged walls, damaged chimneys, blown in windows and damage to internal walls. At Beuvelande Campsite, caravans were destroyed and one had its chassis displaced 40 m (130 ft) and its front cabin found 80 m (260 ft) away. Northeast of the campsite, several telegraph poles were snapped whilst one had been pulled out of the ground and landed 10 m (33 ft) away with no sign of disturbance to the ground, indicating T5. In Fliquet, three terraced cottages built in 1843 had their roofs torn off, with a flat roof from an extension to one of the cottages being found 100 m (330 ft) away. Patio doors from the property penetrated a garage door 60 m (200 ft) away and severely dented the car inside, with holes in the roofs of the property here and render damaged by penetrating debris, indicating T5-6. At St Catherine's Woods, a car which had its handbrake on was lifted from a parking area and ended up 20 m (66 ft) away down a slope, indicating T4. There were numerous incidents of penetrating debris along the whole track, including twigs embedding into render and fragments of tiles penetrating building render, wooden sleepers and trees, indicating T6.

Two other tornadoes hit the British Isles in association with Storm Ciarán: a T2/3 in Loders, Dorset and a T2 in Lancing, West Sussex.

=== 2023 Stalybridge tornado ===
2023 Stalybridge tornado
Meteorological history
- Formed: 27 December 2023
- Duration: 5 minutes

T5 tornado
- on the TORRO scale
- Path length: 6.7 km (4.2 mi)

Overall effects
- Areas affected: Greater Manchester

A T5 tornado hit parts of Tameside in Greater Manchester on 27 December 2023 amid Storm Gerrit. After touching down at around 11:05 p.m. the tornado uprooted trees and damaged cars and roofs in Dukinfield before moving towards Stalybridge, where it caused the most damage. Two adjacent terraced houses were unroofed and one of them also lost parts of it gable and front wall. Many other homes lost roof tiles and a chimney collapsed whilst trees were felled nearby. Further damage was found in Millbrook: many trees were felled, with a large oak tree falling through a roof; a light was torn from a street lamp; and a barn significantly damaged after its end walls partially collapsed and its corrugated metal roof was torn off, being found over 900 m (3,000 ft) away. Tracking on to Carrbrook, the tornado continued to cause damage: a utility pole was snapped; two strong trees were majorly debranched; and many houses' gables collapsed. The final damage was found around Cowbury reservoir, where a motorboat attached to a trailer was thrown around and flipped and many mature trees were severely damaged with some being uprooted, shredded or snapped in half.

Three days after the tornado, a spokesperson for Tameside Council said that 76 dangerous building act notices has been issued following the tornado, with 32 households unable to return to their homes. A total of 134 households received financial support from the Greater Manchester Disaster Relief Fund after being issued with section 77/78 notices.
