= 1913 United Kingdom tornado outbreak =

Tornado outbreak in the United Kingdom

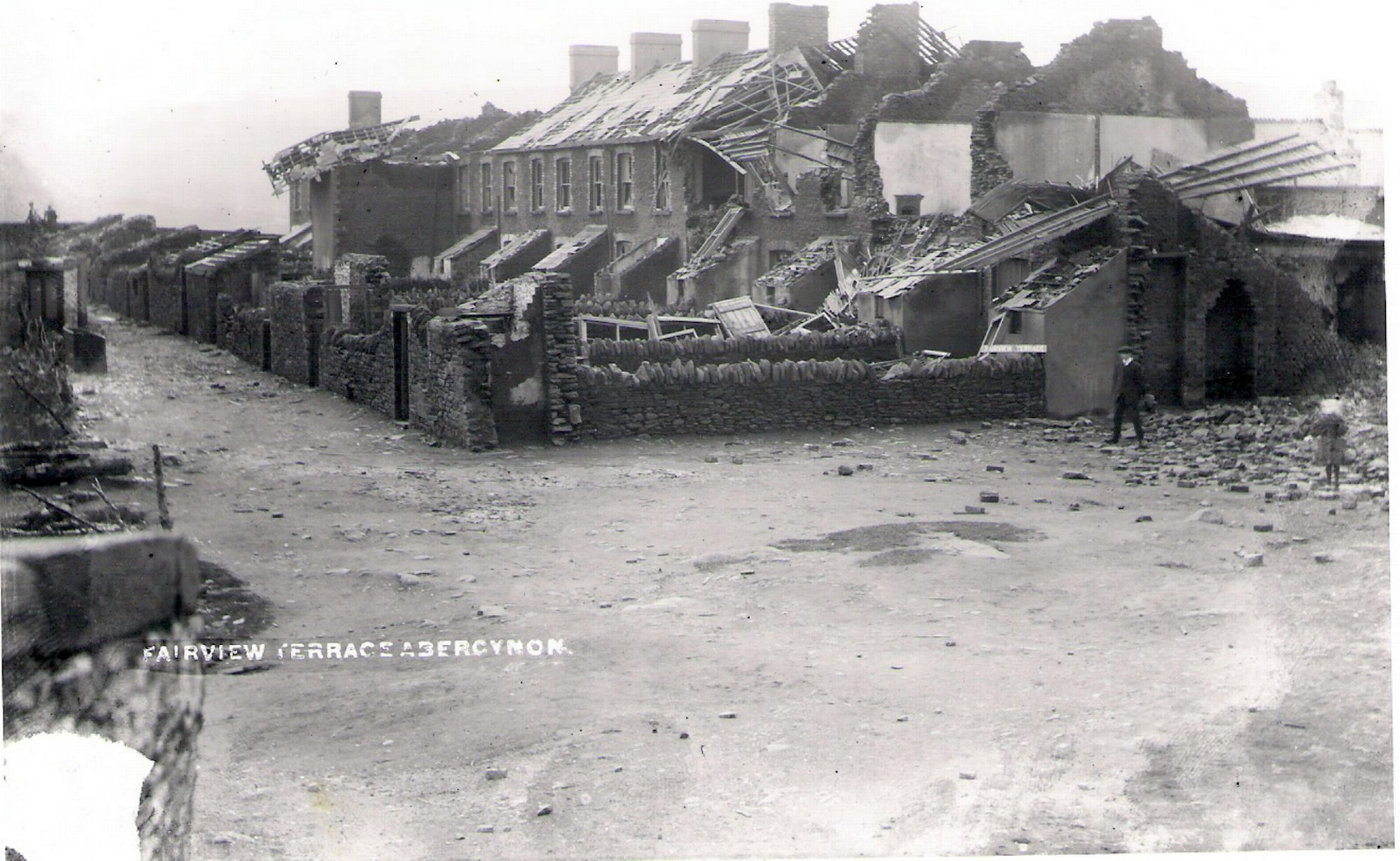
- Damage caused by the tornado in Abercynon

Meteorological history
- Formed: 27 October 1913
- Dissipated: 28 October 1913

Tornado outbreak
- Tornadoes: 15 confirmed
- Max. rating: F3 (Fujita scale); T7 (TORRO scale)
- Highest winds: 160 mph (260 km/h)
- Lowest pressure: 974 hPa (mbar); 28.76 inHg

Overall effects
- Fatalities: 6
- Injuries: 150
- Damage: £100,000 (1913) £11.6 million (2020)
- Areas affected: North East Scotland, North West England, English Midlands, Eastern England, South Wales, Southern England, Cornwall, Munster

The 1913 United Kingdom tornado outbreak was an outbreak of tornadoes, particularly over England and Wales, on 27 October 1913. The most notable tornadoes occurred in South Wales, where at least two tornadoes had winds of at least 160 miles per hour (260 km/h). This is equal to an F3 on the Fujita scale. One of the tornadoes, at Edwardsville, Merthyr Tydfil, resulted in six deaths and hundreds of injuries. This is the deadliest-known tornado to occur in the United Kingdom. Other notable tornadoes struck in Cheshire and Shropshire.

== Meteorological background ==
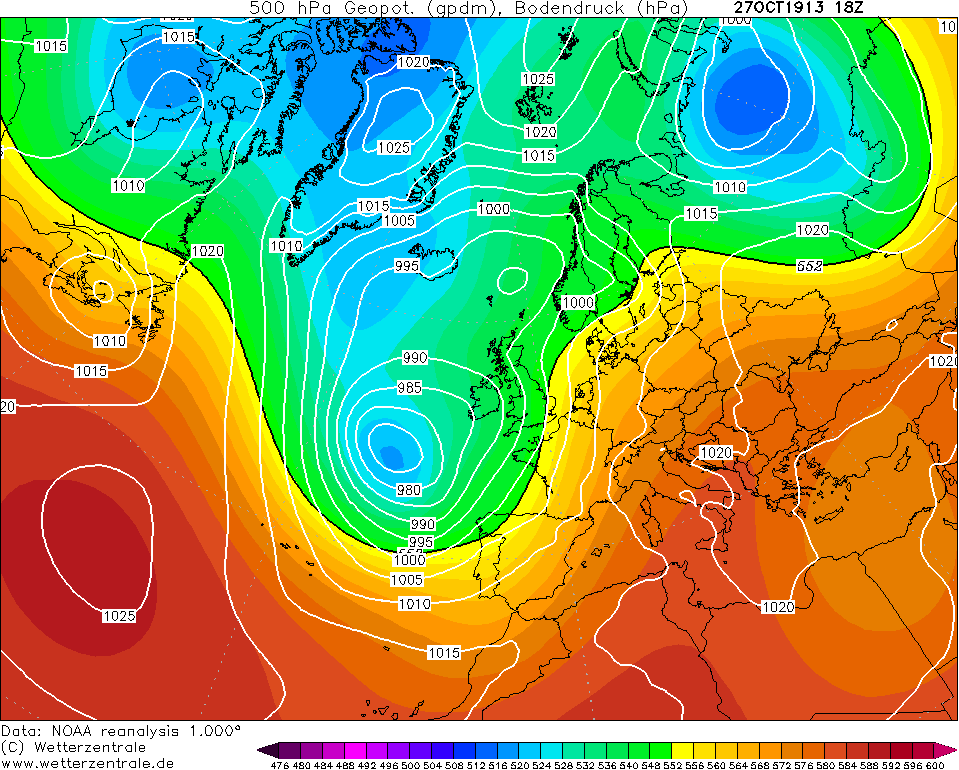
The atmospheric set up at the height of the outbreak – 18:00 on 27 October.

A rapidly deepening low-pressure extratropical cyclone tracked quickly south on the afternoon of 27 October. The central pressure of the system was 990 millibars (29 inHg) at midnight on the 27th, deepening to 975 millibars (28.8 inHg) by 18:00. The low pressure helped to sustain a stream of strong southerly winds, as in days previous, sustaining significantly warmer than average conditions. Temperatures were widely reported over 21 °C (70 °F) in some places. Active weather fronts arriving from the Atlantic Ocean resulted in the instability needed to cause such tornadoes. The low pressure brought cooler air to the country by the 31st.

== Tornadoes ==
Confirmed tornadoes by Fujita rating
FU	F0	F1	F2	F3	F4	F5	Total
10	0	0	1	2	0	0	15 known

=== Most intense tornadoes ===
Most intense tornadoes - Monday 27 October 1913
F#	T#	Location	County	Comments/Damage
Wales
F3	T7	Llantwit Fardre to Bedlinog	Glamorgan	5+ Deaths - A T7 rated tornado tracked up the Taff Valley impacting the communities of Llantwit Fadre, Treforest, Cilfynydd, Abercynon, Edwardsville and Bedlinog. The worst damage occurred in Abercynon and Edwardsville, where at least five people died. Over 100 people were injured.
England
F3	T6	Runcorn	Cheshire	Struck the town around 20:30 to 21:00 before moving off to Lancashire. Caused much damage.
F2	T5	Shrewsbury	Shropshire	Categorised as a T5 on the TORRO scale with winds between 137 and 160 mph.

==== Taff Valley ====
The tornado touched down around 17:45 UTC near Dyffryn Dowlais and began tracking north towards Merthyr Tydfil, in the 5 minutes that would follow it would impact Llantwit Fardre, homes would lose their roof, part of a shed would be carried over a 20 foot high mound, and part of a dog kennel would be blown 100 yards away. After Llantwit Fardre, it would impact the village of Treforest, where it would damage a generating station and a church. As the tornado was impacting the village, a second Tornado formed to the west and rapidly intensified, the second tornado was 100 yards in width, it damaged homes, uprooted trees, and damaged a football ground as it tracked north east, it was quite poorly documented. The main tornado, now 150 yards in width, exited Treforest, where it would shortly after merge with the second tornado. Shortly after the tornadoes merged, it would damage a golf course, before impacting the village of Cilfynydd, the tornado had now intensified and grown to a width of 200 yards. In the village it would remove a corrugated iron roof from a store, which was found wrapped around a telephone pole half a mile away, a chapel would have its northern wall blown in, as well as houses having their roofs and interiors damaged. The tornado would continue to track north, impacting the village of Abercynon, 3 150 yard long walls would be blown down. The tornado was reported to be of 'tremendous violence' in Abercynon, a row of homes would have the roofs and joists removed and a tree would be uprooted and thrown 80 yards. One person would die in the village. In between Abercynon and Edwardsville, it would impact a farm, removing its roof, before impacting Edwardsville itself, in the village, it ripped tombstones out the ground, chapels were wrecked, a boy would be found dead, buried under a wall and large trees would be uprooted. Slates torn from roofs would be found embedded in tree trunks an inch and a half thick, the tornado was now 330 yards wide as it impacted Edwardsville. After Edwardsville the tornado would weaken, impacting the village of Bedlinog at around 18:00, dissipating shortly after.

The tornado would cause £100,000 (1913) in damages, equivalent to £10 million today, it remains the deadliest tornado in the history of Wales and the United Kingdom. It is the only F3 tornado ever recorded in Wales.

In 2013, a service was held to remember the victims of the tornado.

=== Other tornadoes ===
Other tornadoes were reported in England at Blackpool, Craypole, Peckforton, Oundle, Exeter, Collumpton and Worthing. The final tornado of the outbreak was reported at Witcombe Park, Gloucester at around 17:20 on 28 October. A tornado was reported in Scotland at Crathes and in Ireland at Crosshaven. However, all of these tornadoes were generally weak.

== See also ==
- List of European tornadoes and tornado outbreaks
- 1981 United Kingdom tornado outbreak
- 1091 London tornado
- 2005 Birmingham tornado
- 2006 London tornado
