= London tornado =

London tornado may refer to:

- London tornado of 1091, one of the strongest recorded tornadoes in Britain
- 1954 London tornado, a tornado in west London in England.
- 2006 London tornado, a tornado in northwest London in England
- London Tornadoes, a team in the AENA Super Cup
- 2025 Somerset-London Tornado, a violent and deadly tornado in east Kentucky
