= 1981 United Kingdom tornado outbreak =

1981 UK natural disaster

Meteorological history
- Duration: 22–24 November 1981

Tornado outbreak
- Tornadoes: 104
- Max. rating: F2 tornado

Overall effects
- Fatalities: None reported
- Damage: Unknown, but hundreds of properties damaged
- Areas affected: East Midlands; East of England; North West England; South East England; Wales; West Midlands; Yorkshire and the Humber
- Part of the 1981–82 United Kingdom cold wave and tornado outbreaks of 1981

The 1981 United Kingdom tornado outbreak is regarded as the largest recorded tornado outbreak in European history, and is tied with the tornado outbreak of 22–24 November 2004 as the largest November tornado outbreak globally. In the span of 5 hours and 26 minutes during the late morning and early afternoon of 23 November 1981, 104 confirmed tornadoes touched down across Wales and central, northern and eastern England.

Although the majority of tornadoes were very weak, measuring FU-F1 on the Fujita scale, widespread property damage was reported, mainly from the small number of tornadoes which intensified to F2 strength. By the end of the outbreak, hundreds of properties across the country had been damaged.

Most of the tornadoes occurred in rural areas and small villages across central parts of the United Kingdom, although several large metropolitan areas were affected. The St Helens area was the first to be struck by multiple tornadoes around 11:30, followed by the Manchester area around 12:00, the Hull area around 13:30 and the Birmingham area around 14:00. The strongest tornado of the outbreak, an F2 tornado, struck Holyhead in Anglesey, Wales at 10:30; the only other F2 tornado of the outbreak caused considerable damage in the village of Stoneleigh, Warwickshire around 14:00.

With 104 tornadoes, this single-day outbreak alone saw more confirmed tornadoes than any other whole year in British history – 1974 previously held the record, with 80 tornadoes across the whole year. At the time of the 1981 outbreak, there had only been one other tornado outbreak in recorded history which produced more than 100 tornadoes within 24 hours, that being the 1974 Super Outbreak in the United States. However, that outbreak included many more powerful tornadoes and resulted in hundreds of fatalities.

== Meteorological background ==
On 22 November 1981, a rapidly deepening low-pressure extratropical cyclone was centred just off the northern coast of Scotland. The central pressure of this system was 994 mbar at 12:00 GMT on 22 November, deepening to 968 mbar by 12:00 GMT on 23 November.

At the same time, a high-pressure anticyclone was pushing into southern England from mainland Europe. There was an unusually strong upper-level temperature gradient between the low- and high-pressure systems, with the low-pressure system funnelling in cold, arctic air from the north, clashing with humid, subtropical air moving up from southern Europe in the anticyclone.

During the morning of 23 November, a cold front attached to the southern edge of the low-pressure area began to cross the United Kingdom from west to east. Fuelled by this temperature gradient and warm subtropical air to the south, a number of supercell thunderstorms became embedded within the southern edge of the cold front and its pre-frontal rain bands, spawning the first tornadoes over Wales around 10:30 GMT. By mid-afternoon, 104 tornadoes had been confirmed across the United Kingdom.

Several days after the tornado outbreak, the high-pressure anticyclone to the south of the British Isles broke down, allowing colder arctic air to move in from the north, resulting in the start of a record-breaking cold wave.

== Confirmed tornadoes ==
Confirmed tornadoes by Fujita rating
FU	F0	F1	F2	F3	F4	F5	Total
21	24	57	2	0	0	0	104

List of reported tornadoes - Monday 23 November 1981
F#	T#	Location	County	Coord.	Time (UTC)	Path length	Comments/Damage
Wales
F1	T2	Amlwch	Anglesey	53.40°N 4.33°W	10:19 (±15 mins)	6 kilometres (3.7 mi)	First tornado of the outbreak; touched down in Rhosgoch and moved north-eastwards towards Amlwch.
F2	T5	Holyhead	Anglesey	53.31°N 4.64°W	10:34		Strongest tornado of the outbreak. 20 houses were damaged in Holyhead and a mobile home was overturned and destroyed.
FU	TU	Holyhead	Anglesey	53.30°N 4.63°W	10:34		
F1	T2	Penrhos Feilw	Anglesey	53.29°N 4.68°W	10:45 (±15 mins)		
F1	T3	Llanddaniel Fab	Anglesey	53.21°N 4.26°W	11:00 (±5 mins)		
North West England
F1	T3	Wallasey	Merseyside	53.43°N 3.07°W	11:30 (±5 mins)		
F0	T1	Birkenhead	Merseyside	53.40°N 3.03°W	11:30 (±1 hour)		
F1	T2	St Helens	Merseyside	53.45°N 2.73°W	11:50 (±5 mins)		Tornado passed through St Helens town centre, causing damage.
F1	T3	Great Sutton	Cheshire	53.27°N 2.94°W	12:00 (±5 mins)		
F1	T3	Antrobus	Cheshire	53.31°N 2.54°W	12:00 (±3 hours)		
F1	T3	Croft	Cheshire	53.43°N 2.55°W	12:00 (±3 hours)	11 kilometres (6.8 mi)	Tornado later moved over the town of Warrington, causing some damage.
F1	T2	Hollinwood	Greater Manchester	53.52°N 2.13°W	12:00 (±30 mins)	5 kilometres (3.1 mi)	Tornado later moved over the town of Oldham, causing some damage.
F1	T2	Cheadle Hulme	Greater Manchester	53.37°N 2.18°W	12:00 (±3 hours)		Small tornado affecting parts of the town of Stockport.
F0	T1	Whitefield	Greater Manchester	53.55°N 2.30°W	12:00 (±3 hours)		Small tornado affecting parts of the town of Bury.
F0	T1	Timperley	Greater Manchester	53.40°N 2.33°W	12:00 (±5 mins)		
West Midlands
F1	T2	Norbury	Shropshire	53.53°N 2.94°W	12:00 (±3 hours)	60 kilometres (37 mi)	Staying on the ground for a long distance, this tornado also significantly affected the town of Whitchurch before dissipating.
F1	T3	Market Drayton	Shropshire	52.91°N 2.49°W	12:00 (±5 mins)		
F0	T1	Beckbury	Shropshire	52.62°N 2.35°W	12:00 (±3 hours)		
F1	T2	Knockin	Shropshire	52.78°N 3.00°W	12:00 (±3 hours)	8 kilometres (5.0 mi)	Also affected the town of Oswestry, causing some damage.
F1	T2	Chetwynd Manor	Shropshire	52.77°N 2.38°W	12:00 (±5 mins)	5 kilometres (3.1 mi)	The market town of Newport was also impacted by this tornado.
F1	T2	Ironbridge	Shropshire	52.63°N 2.47°W	12:00 (±3 hours)		
F0	T1	Kenilworth	Warwickshire	52.35°N 1.58°W	12:00 (±15 mins)		
F0	T1	Fenny Compton	Warwickshire	52.15°N 1.38°W	12:00 (±3 hours)		
F1	T2	Wem	Shropshire	52.86°N 2.72°W	12:05 (±5 mins)		
F1	T2	Fordhouses	West Midlands	52.63°N 2.13°W	14:00 (±1 hour)		Tornado caused damage in the suburbs of Wolverhampton.
F1	T2	Bloxwich	West Midlands	52.62°N 2.00°W	14:00 (±1 hour)		Tornado affected the outskirts of Walsall.
F1	T2	Dudley	West Midlands	52.50°N 2.08°W	14:00 (±1 hour)	1.5 kilometres (0.93 mi)	Tornado touched down in the suburb of Woodsetton and later passed through Dudley town centre causing some damage before dissipating.
F1	T2	Erdington	West Midlands	52.52°N 1.84°W	14:00 (±1 hour)		Tornado impacted the northern suburbs of Birmingham, causing some damage.
F1	T2	Selly Oak	West Midlands	52.43°N 1.95°W	14:00 (±1 hour)		Tornado impacted the southern suburbs of Birmingham, causing some damage.
F0	T1	Solihull	West Midlands	52.42°N 1.78°W	14:00 (±1 hour)		Tornado affected the Windmill Road area of Solihull Lodge
F2	T4	Stoneleigh	Warwickshire	52.35°N 1.52°W	14:00 (±15 mins)		Second strongest tornado of the outbreak, caused considerable damage in the village of Stoneleigh. 20 large static caravans were blown over and destroyed.
South East England
F0	T1	Claydon	Oxfordshire	52.13°N 1.33°W	12:00 (±3 hours)		
F0	T1	Hornton	Oxfordshire	52.08°N 1.42°W	12:00 (±3 hours)		
F1	T2	Haversham	Buckinghamshire	52.07°N 0.78°W	12:00 (±3 hours)		Affected Milton Keynes.
F1	T3	Wolverton	Buckinghamshire	52.05°N 0.82°W	12:00 (±3 hours)		Affected Milton Keynes.
East Midlands
F0	T1	Daventry	Northamptonshire	52.25°N 1.17°W	12:00 (±3 hours)		
F1	T2	Great Houghton	Northamptonshire	52.22°N 0.83°W	12:00 (±3 hours)		
F0	T1	Yardley Hastings	Northamptonshire	52.20°N 0.73°W	12:00 (±3 hours)		
F1	T2	Wrawby	Lincolnshire	53.57°N 0.47°W	13:15 (±5 mins)		
F1	T3	South Killingholme	Lincolnshire	53.57°N 0.23°W	13:30 (±1 hour)		
F1	T2	Keelby	Lincolnshire	53.57°N 0.25°W	13:30 (±1 hour)		
F1	T3	Grimsby	Lincolnshire	53.53°N 0.05°W	13:30 (±1 hour)		
F0	T0	Tydd St Mary	Lincolnshire	52.75°N 0.14°E	14:45 (±30 mins)		
Yorkshire and the Humber
F1	T2	Kingston upon Hull	East Riding of Yorkshire	53.75°N 0.34°W	13:30 (±5 mins)		Tornado passed through the north-eastern residential suburbs of Hull, causing damage.
F0	T0	Kingston upon Hull	East Riding of Yorkshire	53.74°N 0.29°W	13:30 (±1 hour)		Small tornado affected the Port of Hull.
East of England
F1	T2	Carlton	Bedfordshire	52.19°N 0.61°W	14:45 (±5 mins)		
F0	T0	Aspley Guise	Bedfordshire	52.02°N 0.63°W	14:45 (±30 mins)		
F1	T2	Flitton	Bedfordshire	52.00°N 0.45°W	14:45 (±30 mins)		
F0	T0	Luton	Bedfordshire	51.88°N 0.42°W	14:45 (±30 mins)		Small tornado affected Luton, causing minimal damage.
F1	T2	Letchworth Garden City	Hertfordshire	51.97°N 0.22°W	14:45 (±30 mins)		
F1	T2	Fowlmere	Cambridgeshire	52.08°N 0.08°E	14:45 (±5 mins)		
F0	T0	Friday Bridge	Cambridgeshire	52.62°N 0.16°E	14:45 (±30 mins)		
F1	T2	Upwell	Norfolk	52.60°N 0.22°E	14:45 (±30 mins)		
F1	T3	Huntingdon	Cambridgeshire	52.33°N 0.18°W	14:45 (±5 mins)		Moderate tornado caused damage in Huntingdon town centre.
FU	TU	Wicken	Cambridgeshire	52.30°N 0.30°E	14:45 (±30 mins)		
F1	T2	Diddington	Cambridgeshire	52.27°N 0.25°W	14:45 (±30 mins)		
F1	T2	Harrold	Bedfordshire	52.20°N 0.61°W	15:00 (±5 mins)		
F1	T2	Silsoe	Bedfordshire	52.00°N 0.42°W	15:00 (±5 mins)		
F0	T1	Melton Constable	Norfolk	52.85°N 1.03°E	15:00 (±5 mins)		
F1	T2	Swaffham	Norfolk	52.65°N 0.68°E	15:00 (±30 mins)		
F0	T1	Norwich	Norfolk	52.63°N 1.30°E	15:00 (±30 mins)		Small tornado affected Norwich city centre and surrounding suburbs, causing widespread but minor damage.
F1	T2	Shipdham	Norfolk	52.62°N 0.90°E	15:00 (±15 mins)		
F0	T1	Foulden	Norfolk	52.55°N 0.60°E	15:00 (±30 mins)		
F1	T2	Methwold	Norfolk	52.52°N 0.55°E	15:00 (±5 mins)		
F1	T2	Morningthorpe	Norfolk	52.48°N 1.27°E	15:00 (±30 mins)		
F0	T1	Pulham Market	Norfolk	52.42°N 1.25°E	15:00 (±30 mins)		
F0	T1	Pulham St Mary	Norfolk	52.43°N 1.25°E	15:00 (±30 mins)		
F0	T1	Lakenheath	Suffolk	52.43°N 0.57°E	15:00 (±30 mins)		
F0	T1	Heybridge Basin	Essex	51.73°N 0.71°E	15:00 (±15 mins)		
F1	T2	Antingham	Norfolk	52.85°N 1.35°E	15:15 (±15 mins)		
F1	T2	Long Stratton	Norfolk	52.48°N 1.23°E	15:15 (±5 mins)		
F1	T2	Elmswell	Suffolk	52.23°N 0.92°E	15:15 (±30 mins)		
F1	T2	Chelmsford	Essex	51.73°N 0.48°E	15:15 (±30 mins)		Tornado affected Chelmsford city centre and surrounding suburbs causing minor damage.
F1	T3	North Creake	Norfolk	52.90°N 0.77°E	15:20 (±15 mins)		
F0	T1	Mendlesham	Suffolk	52.25°N 1.07°E	15:20 (±5 mins)		
F1	T3	Beccles	Suffolk	52.47°N 1.57°E	15:30 (±5 mins)		
F1	T2	Combs	Suffolk	52.17°N 0.99°E	15:30 (±5 mins)		
F1	T2	Needham Market	Suffolk	52.16°N 1.06°E	15:30 (±15 mins)		
F1	T3	Coddenham	Suffolk	52.13°N 1.12°E	15:30 (±5 mins)		
F1	T2	Chignall Smealy	Essex	51.78°N 0.41°E	15:30 (±5 mins)		
F1	T2	Broomfield	Essex	51.77°N 0.47°E	15:30 (±5 mins)		
F1	T2	Mundon	Essex	51.68°N 1.12°E	15:35 (±5 mins)		
F1	T2	Wymondham	Norfolk	52.57°N 1.12°E	15:40 (±15 mins)		
F1	T2	Clacton-on-Sea	Essex	51.79°N 1.16°E	15:45 (±5 mins)		Tornado affected Clacton town centre and the seafront, causing moderate damage.
F1	T2	West Mersea	Essex	51.77°N 0.90°E	15:45 (±5 mins)		Last tornado of the outbreak, touching down 5 hours and 26 minutes after the first tornado.

== See also ==
- List of European tornadoes and tornado outbreaks
- 1091 London tornado
- 2005 Birmingham tornado
- 2006 London tornado
