= Torro =

- Lucas Torró, a Spanish footballer
- María Teresa Torró Flor, a Spanish professional tennis player

== See also ==
- TORRO, a tornado and storm research organisation
