= 1954 London tornado =

1954 F3 tornado in London

Meteorological history
- Date: December 8, 1954
- Formed: 5PM (approx)

F3 tornado
- on the Fujita scale

T7 tornado
- on the TORRO scale
- Highest winds: 158–206 mph (254–332 km/h)

Overall effects
- Fatalities: 0
- Injuries: 30+
- Areas affected: West London, United Kingdom

On the evening of December 8, 1954, a damaging tornado moved through the western suburbs of London, United Kingdom. The F3 tornado injured more than 30, and caused significant damage in particular to the suburbs of Gunnersbury and Acton along a 19-kilometre (12 mi) path.

== Meteorological synopsis ==
On December 6, 1954, a depression formed over the Atlantic and moved southeastward on the 7th and 8th while rapidly deepening. By the afternoon of December 8, the depression had a central pressure below 956mb and was approaching the mouth of the Bristol Channel. The occlusion front passed northeastward over London around midday on the 8th.

By 4PM, thunderstorms had begun to develop over the English Channel, moving northeastward at 46kts, and were captured on Met Office radar. One such thunderstorm was detected at around 4:05PM GMT, coinciding with a report of a waterspout at Langstone Toll Bridge at 4:10PM.

The echo was detected again at 4:22PM GMT, approximately 3 miles northwest of Midhurst, Sussex, approaching Greater London. A line of further thunderstorms developed south of the initial cell, which was noted to have been producing heavy rainfall, hail, and bright lightning.

Several other weaker tornadoes occurred in Southwest London prior to the main event.

Confirmed tornadoes by Fujita rating
FU	F0	F1	F2	F3	F4	F5	Total
0	2	4	0	1	0	0	7

By 17:04PM GMT, height-range radar detected a cell 5 miles in diameter, and to a height of 22,000 feet. Met Office plan-position radar shows a well-developed thunderstorm located just north of the River Thames at 5:08PM GMT, with a hook-echo signature, coinciding with the tornado's passage of Acton.

== Tornado summary ==
The tornado began at the River Thames in the district of Gunnersbury, damaging several homes at Thames Road, Oxford Gardens, and Strand on the Green, before approaching the Britvic works south of Gunnersbury Station, where the roof collapsed, injuring 6.

The tornado continued northeast, striking Gunnersbury station, causing the iron roof to collapse onto the platform, burying 15 passengers and injuring 8. Further injuries were noted outside the station from flying debris.

The tornado then crossed Chiswick High Road and Gunnersbury Triangle into South Acton, making a direct hit on the Royal Standard Laundry, where an 80-foot chimney collapsed into a boiler room, causing major structural and equipment damage, before moving into the neighbourhood along Bollo Lane and Antrobus Road, where the tornado likely reached peak intensity. Damage occurred to nearly every house in Ivy Crescent, the southern end of Bollo Lane, Montgomery Road, Antrobus Road, Rothschild Road, Temple Road, Kingswood Road and Cunnington Street; several lost exterior walls, roofs, and one lost an entire upper storey. In Rothschild Road, a small factory was also seriously damaged.

The damage to this area was likened to The Blitz; approximately 500 buildings in Acton sustained some form of damage. Several other serious injuries occurred in Acton, including an incident where a woman was taken to hospital after the railing she had been holding onto was struck by lightning.

The tornado then struck the Chiswick Woolworth's store, blowing in the shopfront and blowing away a baling machine, and damaging a children's playground at Southfield Road, before blocking a railway line with trees. It also caused serious damage to a lead factory in this area, along with many other homes, and many trees in Acton Park.

The tornado then entered East Acton, causing further significant damage to homes, lifting a bus into the air at Du Cane Road, and causing severe damage to businesses at Erconwald Street, which were never rebuilt. It then crossed Wormwood Scrubs, and entered the district of Willesden, blocking several roads and a railway line adjacent to Willesden Junction station, and overturning a lorry at Harrow Road. A further 5 were injured in this area.

The next area to be impacted was a residential area south of King Edward XII Park, again causing significant damage to around 300 homes, particularly in Wrottesley Road, Herbert Gardens and Doyle Gardens. A further 7 in this area were hospitalised. Further damage occurred to the area surrounding Willesden Green tube station where a further 6 were injured.

The tornado continued northeastward through the districts of Cricklewood, Golders Green, and Hampstead Garden Suburb, before finally dissipating near Southgate.

== Aftermath ==
Following the tornado, emergency services responded to the scene. Dozens of injured were transported to West Middlesex Hospital, and fire crews attended to free those trapped inside damaged buildings and buried underneath debris.

Tarpaulins were distributed to those who had damaged roofs, and West Willesden councillor Mr. S. P. Viant spoke in parliament, requesting financial aid, and noting that many property owners were uninsured for this type of event. The Ministry of Housing and Local Government refused to provide financial relief to uninsured homeowners, stating that insurance was a matter of "normal prudence".

In total, approximately 800 residences across Willesden, Acton, Brentford and Chiswick were damaged. The tornado was widely reported on in local and international newspapers.

Areas adjacent to the tornado’s path near Kensal Green were again struck by an F2 tornado 52 years later in 2006.

== See also ==
- 2006 London tornado - an F2 tornado which struck similar areas of London 52 years later.
- 1931 Birmingham tornado - a tornado of a similar intensity which struck Birmingham in 1931.
