= 1981–82 United Kingdom cold wave =

Severe winter in the UK

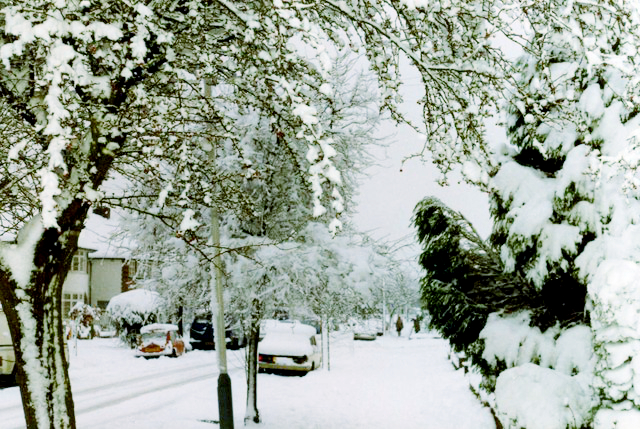
- Snow in Eastcote, Greater London in December

Meteorological history
- Formed: December 1981
- Dissipated: January 1982

Unknown-strength storm
- Lowest temperature: −27.2 °C (−17.0 °F) (10 January 1982, Braemar, Aberdeenshire)

Overall effects
- Areas affected: Great Britain and Ireland

The winter of 1981–1982 in the United Kingdom (also called The Big Snow of 1982 by the press) was a severe cold wave that was formed in early December 1981 and lasted until mid-late January in 1982. It was one of the coldest Decembers recorded in the United Kingdom.

At the end of November 1981, a strong high-pressure anticyclone over southern England was keeping temperatures around the average for the time of year. Numerous strong low-pressure extratropical cyclones passing to the north of Scotland dragged cold upper-level air down from the Arctic, but the anticyclone to the south of the United Kingdom deflected the coldest air away from the British Isles. On 23 November 1981, a cold front crossing the United Kingdom, fuelled by humid subtropical air from the south colliding with this colder Arctic air from the north, spawned 104 tornadoes as part of a record-breaking nationwide tornado outbreak. Following the passing of the cold front, the anticyclone to the south began to break down, allowing the colder Arctic air to move in over Great Britain and Ireland from the north and precipitating the start of the severe cold wave at the start of December.

The Central England Temperature region (CET) recorded a daily mean temperature of 0.3 °C (32.5 °F) and a daily minimum temperature of −2.7 °C (27.1 °F), for December, the coldest December recorded in the 20th century. The CET region also reported its lowest minimum December temperature at −15.9 °C (3.4 °F) on the 13th. The lowest temperature recorded in December was −25.2 °C (−13.4 °F) recorded in Shawbury, Shropshire on the 13th, and is the lowest December temperature recorded in England. Wales also recorded its lowest recorded December temperature during the cold wave, with a temperature of −22.7 °C (−8.9 °F) recorded at Corwen, Denbighshire also on the 13th.

The lowest temperature recorded in the United Kingdom during the cold wave was recorded in Scotland with a temperature of −27.2 °C (−17.0 °F) recorded in Braemar, Aberdeenshire on 10 January, and is the lowest temperature ever recorded in the United Kingdom. England also recorded its lowest temperature during the cold wave at −26.1 °C (−15.0 °F) which was recorded at Newport, Telford and Wrekin, also on 10 January.
