= Mundon =

Village in Essex, England

Coordinates: 51.689971°N 0.709833°E

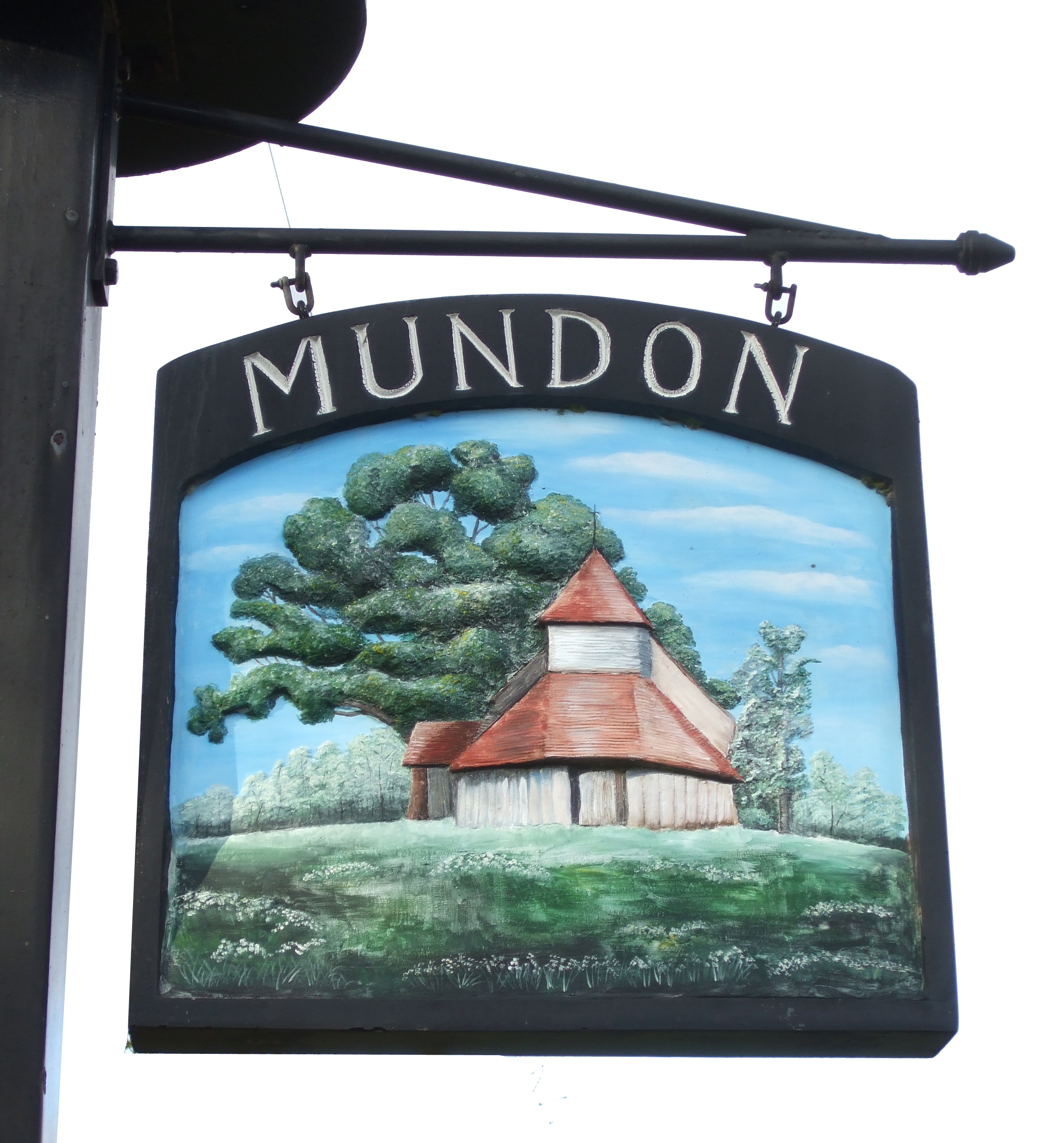
- Village sign

- Location within Essex
- Population: 372 (Parish, 2021)
- OS grid reference: TL874025
- Civil parish: Mundon
- District: Maldon
- Shire county: Essex
- Region: East
- Country: England
- Sovereign state: United Kingdom
- Post town: Maldon
- Postcode district: CM9
- Dialling code: 01621
- Police: Essex
- Fire: Essex
- Ambulance: East of England
- UK Parliament: Maldon and East Chelmsford

Mundon is a village and civil parish on the Dengie peninsula in Maldon District in the county of Essex, England. It lies 3 miles south-east of Maldon. At the 2021 census the parish had a population of 372.

The place-name 'Mundon' is first attested in the Domesday Book of 1086, where it appears as Munduna. The name means 'Munda's hill'.

The manor of Munduna passed from the king's thegn Godwin to Eudo Dapifer at the Norman Conquest.

Until the Dissolution of the Monasteries Mundon formed part of the estates of St John's Abbey, Colchester; it passed to Thomas Cromwell before being returned to the Duchy of Lancaster, which held the right of presentation to the vicarage until the 20th century.

The 14th-century timber-framed Church of St. Mary, built within the remains of the moat of Mundon Hall, and likely on Saxon and Norman foundations, has been disused since the 1970s, but is currently in the care of Friends of Friendless Churches, supported by English Heritage. Following a long period of remedial work, the church re-opened to visitors in August 2009. The entire church was underpinned, and much structural work was carried out by Bakers of Danbury. The church was re-glazed, and now, internally, appears lighter than it has in recent years. It is a grade I listed building.

Mundon Hall is now represented by an 18th-century farmhouse of rendered and whitewashed brick.

The village was struck by an F1/T2 tornado on 23 November 1981, as part of the record-breaking nationwide tornado outbreak on that day.

== Mundon Furze ==
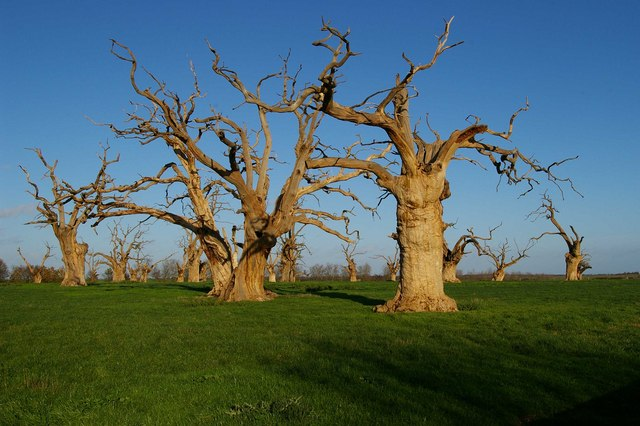
Dead oak trees behind St Mary's Church at Mundon Hall Farm

The Furze is one of the last areas of surviving ancient woodland in the Dengie peninsula. The dominant tree species are oak and ash. Pedunculate Oak (Quercus robur) dominates the northern half of the Furze. Bramble (Rubus fruticosus) covers most of the ground layer, with small wet areas supporting Pendulous Sedge (Carex pendula) and Soft rush (Juncus effusus).

Several houses have been built in the southern part of this ancient wood.

== White House Farm Canal ==
From 1832 to about 1880 a private canal operated from White House Farm to the River Blackwater.
