= St Mary's Church, Mundon =

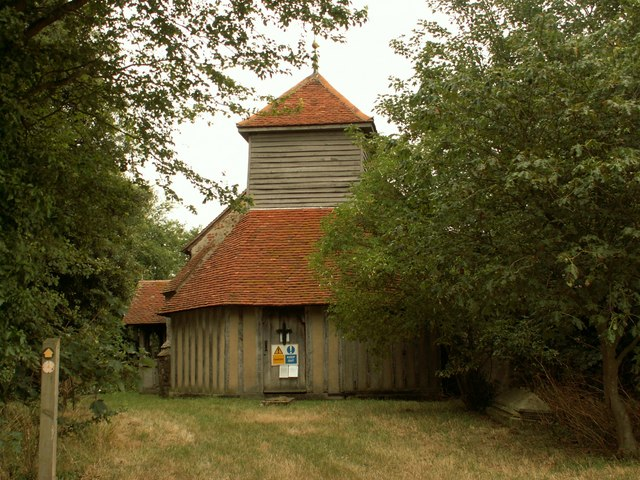
- The tower and belfry of St Mary's Church, Mundon

- Location in Essex
- 51.6912°N 0.7182°E
- OS grid reference: TL 880 027
- Location: Mundon, Essex
- Country: England
- Denomination: Anglican
- Website: Friends of Friendless Churches

Architecture
- Functional status: Redundant
- Heritage designation: Grade I
- Designated: 1 November 1953
- Architectural type: Church

Specifications
- Materials: Nave plastered stone rubble, chancel brick, aisle timber-framed, belfry weatherboarded, red tile roofs

Administration
- Province: Canterbury
- Diocese: Chelmsford
- Archdeaconry: Southend
- Deanery: Maldon and Dengie
- Parish: St Mary the Virgin, Maldon with Mundon

St Mary's Church is a redundant Anglican church in the village of Mundon, Essex, England. It is recorded in the National Heritage List for England as a designated Grade I listed building, and is under the care of the Friends of Friendless Churches.

== History ==
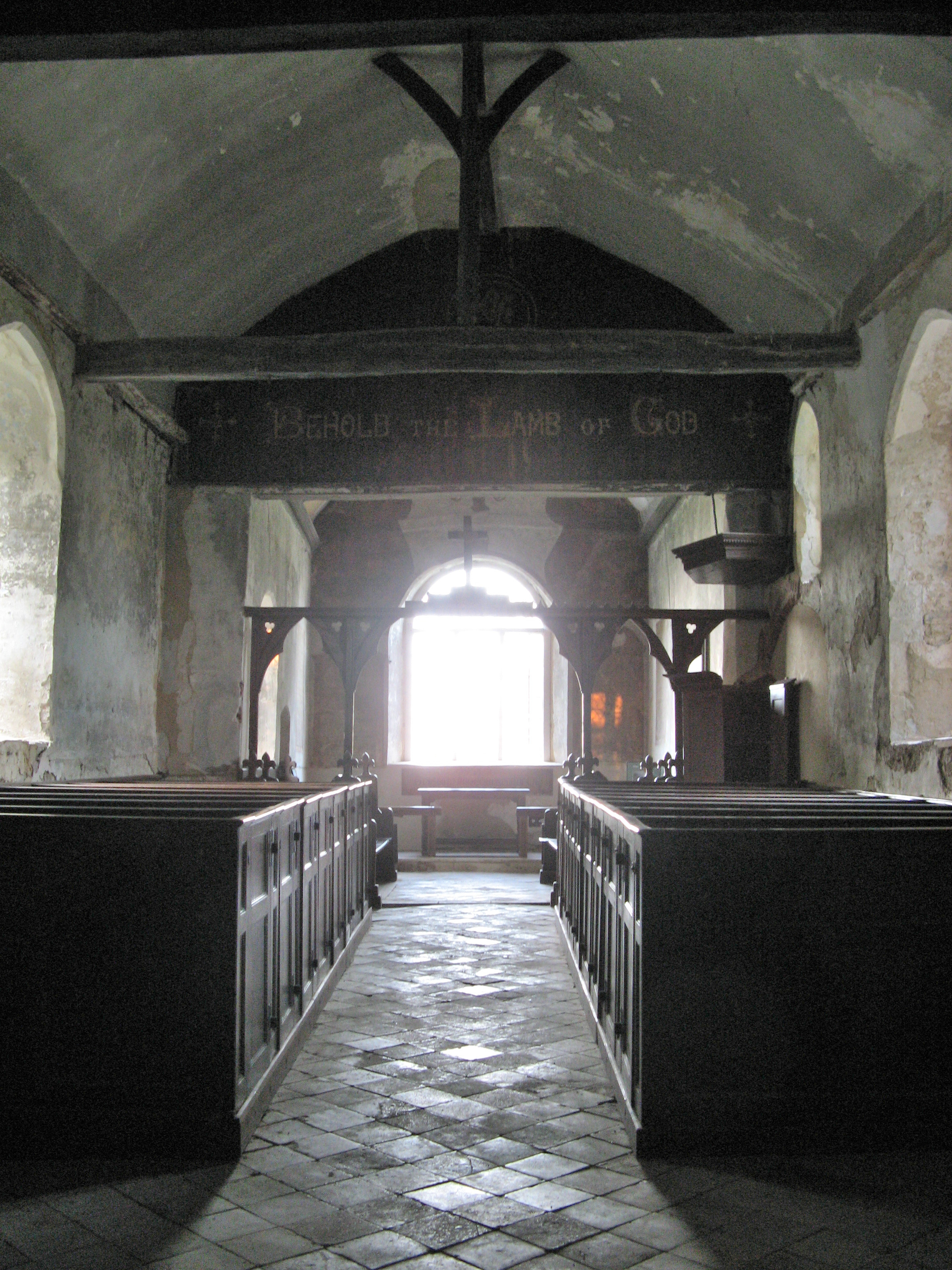
18th-century box pews and octagonal pulpit. "Behold the Lamb of God" is written on the ceiling divider.

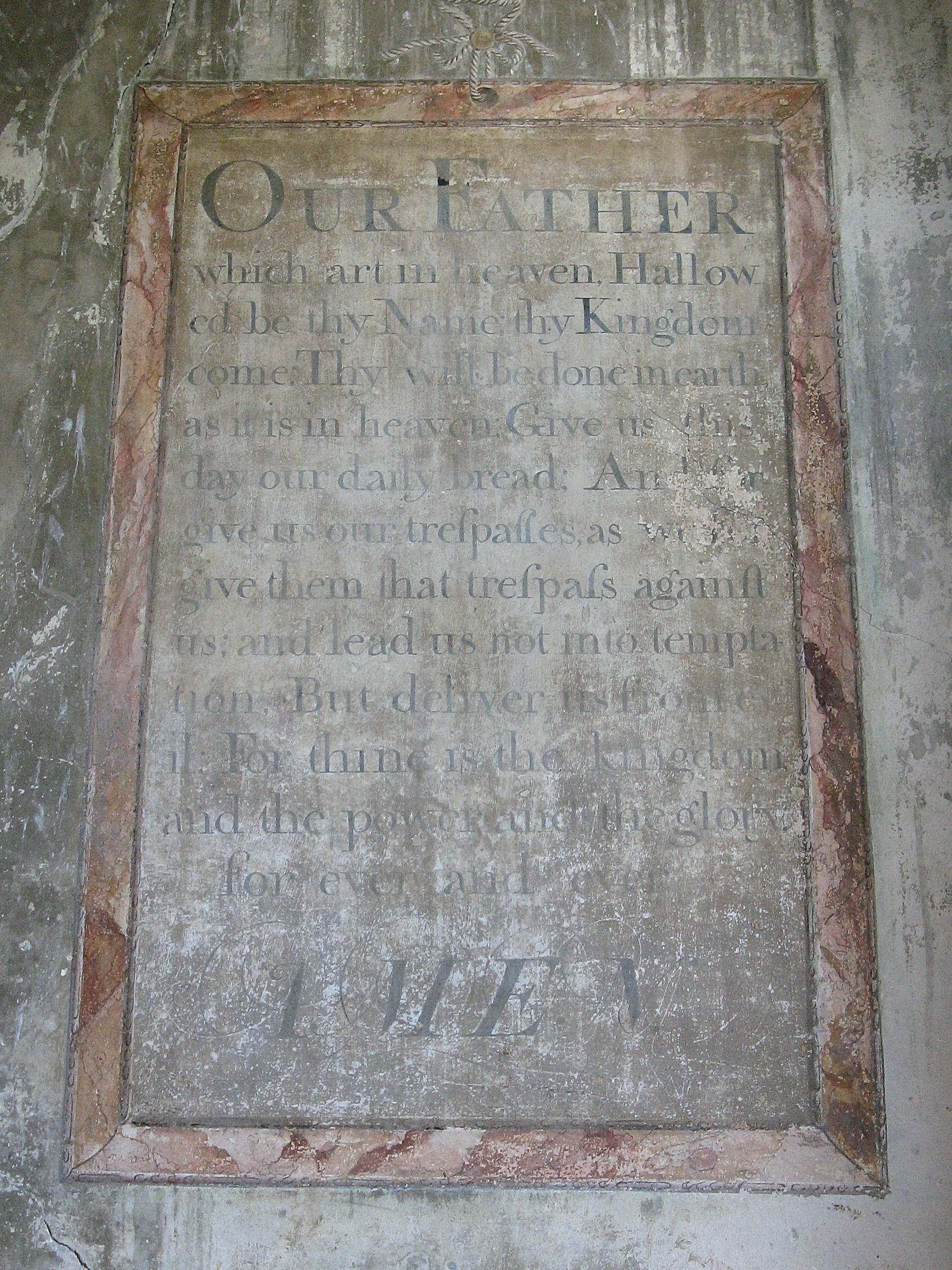
18th-century painted Lord's Prayer

The oldest fabric in the present church dates from the 14th century. The church is built within the moated enclosure of Mundon Hall. It is thought that an earlier church existed on the site, possibly dating back to the Anglo-Saxon era, as it is situated on St Peter's Way, an ancient pilgrim's route to St Peter's Chapel, Bradwell. In addition the font, which has been removed, was dated to about 1200. The tower, with its timber belfry, was erected in the 16th century. The north porch was added in about 1600.

By 1684 the church had fallen into disrepair. During the following century it was rebuilt in brick on the old foundations. In the 19th and 20th centuries the population of the immediate locality declined, and the fabric of the church deteriorated again. In addition it was damaged by the blast from a V-bomb during the Second World War. Although some repairs were undertaken after the war, church services were held elsewhere, and in 1974 the parish was transferred to St Mary's in Maldon. The church was taken into the care of the charity the Friends of Friendless Churches during the following year. The charity holds a 999-year lease with effect from 1 January 1975. Since its acquisition repair and conservation work has been carried out, assisted by a grant of £140,000 from English Heritage. From September 2009 the church has been open to visitors. An annual service is held in the church.

== Architecture, fittings and furnishings ==
The plan of the church consists of a nave with a north porch, a chancel, and a tower supporting a belfry; around the tower is a semi-octagonal aisle. The nave is constructed in plastered stone rubble, the chancel is in brick, the aisle around the tower is timber-framed, the belfry is weatherboarded, and the roofs are covered in red tiles. Inside the church is a complete set of 18th-century box pews and an 18th-century octagonal pulpit. On the chancel walls, also dating from the 18th century, are paintings of the Ten Commandments, the Lord's Prayer, the Creed, and other texts. Above the east window is a mural depicting curtains being drawn aside, with hanging tassels, "in a rare rural attempt at trompe l'oeil".
