= International Journal of Meteorology =

- Editor: Paul Knightley
- Former editors: G. Terence Meaden (1975-2002); Robert K. Doe (2002-2006); Samantha Hall (2006-Sept 2012)
- Staff writers: Matthew R. Clark; Kieran Hickey
- Categories: Weather, climate
- Frequency: Bimonthly
- Circulation: 2,000
- Founder: G. Terence Meaden
- Founded: 1975
- Company: Artetech Pub. Co. for TORRO
- Country: United Kingdom
- Based in: Bournemouth
- Language: English
- Website: www.ijmet.org
- ISSN: 1748-2992
- OCLC: 654969105

The International Journal of Meteorology is a bimonthly science magazine on meteorology and severe weather, particularly that of the United Kingdom and Europe. It is a semi-professional non-profit publication with a mix of academic and amateur articles. It is published by Artetech Pub. Co. for TORRO.

== See also ==
- Storm Track
- Weatherwise
