= Penrhos Feilw Standing Stones =

Standing stones on Holy Island, Anglesey

Coordinates: 53.2957°N 4.6618°W

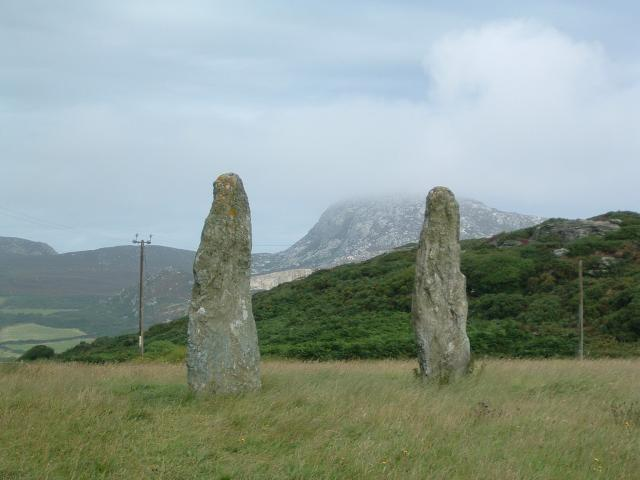
Penrhos Feilw with Holyhead Mountain behind

The Penrhos Feilw Standing Stones are a pair of standing stones on Holy Island west of Anglesey in north-west Wales. They are thought to date from the Bronze Age but their origins and purpose are unclear. They are about 3 m (10 ft) high and are a similar distance apart.

== Stones ==
The stones are located behind the farmhouse of Plas Meilw, some 2 km (1.2 mi) southwest of Holyhead and a similar distance south of Holyhead Mountain. Little is known about the history of the stones. They are believed to be between 3,500 and 4,000 years old and are a Scheduled ancient monument. The exposed part of each stone is about 3 m (10 ft) high and 1 m (3 ft) broad at the base, but only about 20 cm (8 in) thick. They are situated about 3 m (10 ft) apart on an open grassy place above Porth Dafarch between two low hills. They are aligned along their long axes in a northeasterly/southwesterly direction, with a fine view of the coast and towards Holyhead Mountain. There are theories that they may have formed part of a stone circle, however there is no evidence to support this. It is also said that there was previously a stone cist between them, but again this story lacks supporting evidence. There may be some significance to the fact that they are located just 100 m (328 ft) from the Plas Meilw hut circle but their presence here is "quite enigmatic".

== Access ==
The stones are in the care of Cadw; the site is open to the public throughout the year, except around Christmas and the New Year, free of charge. Access is through a kissing gate and across a grassy field, and there is a pull-in by the roadside, large enough for a single car.
