= London tornado of 1091 =

One of the strongest tornadoes in British Isles

Meteorological history
- Date: 17 October 1091

F4 tornado
- on the Fujita scale

T8 tornado
- on the TORRO scale
- Highest winds: >343 km/h (213 mph)

Overall effects
- Fatalities: 2
- Areas affected: London, United Kingdom

The London Tornado of 1091 is the earliest reported tornado in England, occurring in London on Friday, 17 October 1091. It has been estimated by modern assessment as possibly a T8 on the TORRO scale (roughly equivalent to an F4 on the Fujita scale), making it one of the strongest recorded tornadoes in the British Isles, alongside the 1666 Lincolnshire tornado, although this estimate is based on reports written 30 years later.

The church of St Mary-le-Bow in the city of London was badly damaged; four rafters 26 feet (7.9 m) long were driven into the ground so that only 4 feet (1.2 m) protruded above the surface. Other nearby churches were demolished by the tornado, as were over 600 mostly wooden houses. For all the damage, there were just two known fatalities in a population of about 18,000. The tornado is mentioned in chronicles by Florence of Worcester and William of Malmesbury, the latter describing it as "a great spectacle for those watching from afar, but a terrifying experience for those standing near".

== See also ==
- Tornado records
- 2006 London tornado
