= 2006 London tornado =

Tornado in northwest London, England

Meteorological history
- Formed: 7 December 2006 11:00 GMT

F2 tornado
- on the Fujita scale

T5 tornado
- on the TORRO scale
- Highest winds: 137–160 mph (220–257 km/h)

Overall effects
- Injuries: 6
- Areas affected: Kensal Green, northwest London

The 2006 London tornado was a significant United Kingdom tornado spawned from a squall line moving over the city on 7 December 2006 at approximately 11:02 GMT. Its intensity is estimated to have been T5 on the TORRO scale, equating to F2 on the Fujita scale.

== Meteorological synopsis ==
On the morning of 7 December, the UK was under the influence of a strong Atlantic Ocean low pressure system, which was named Ulrike, bringing unstable weather conditions to much of the UK, and the south in particular. At approximately 07:30 GMT, a small band of thunderstorms initialised over Cornwall moving east-northeast across the country.

At 10:15 GMT, TORRO issued a convective discussion stating: "Bands of showers and thunderstorms producing marginally severe weather, including wind gusts to 80-88kph (50-55mph), hail 10-15mm diameter, perhaps locally accumulating, occasional cloud-ground lightning and briefly torrential rain. Tornadoes cannot be ruled out, especially in coastal regions, but the lack of much low-level shear will limit this potential."

By approximately 10:00 am, the squall line had reached Salisbury, where a drop in humidity was recorded, which may have resulted in an increase of atmospheric pressure behind the squall, causing it to accelerate forward. This increased motion in combination with a change in wind direction ahead of the storm may have initialised the rotation of the mesocyclone in one of the now strong storm cells, resulting in the touchdown of the T5 tornado in Kensal Rise, London, at 11 am.

== Tornado summary ==
Damage was first noted at Palermo Road and All Souls Avenue, where TV aerials were badly damaged, and roof tile damage was noted to St Mark’s Church. Further minor damage to aerials and roof tiles was noted along Bathurst Gardens and Buchanan Gardens, along with a broken window. TORRO rated damage at this location T1 on the TORRO Scale.

Damage became more significant as the tornado approached College Road, including several tiles removed from homes, and a fallen tree. Similar damage was found in Leigh Gardens and Whitmore Gardens, which both had been blocked by police. In Whitmore Gardens, a chimney had also been blown over into the neighbouring home. This damage was rated T3, and the tornado in this area had a width of approximately 200 metres.

More significant damage occurred at the end of Whitmore Gardens at the intersection with Chamberlayne Road, where a home lost an exterior wall. Homes in this area also suffered complete loss of roofs, which was rated at T4. The surrounding streets were blocked by large amounts of debris including roof tiles and tree branches. Homes in Crediton Road also lost their roofs at T4 intensity, and one home lost the entire roof as well as a portion of an exterior wall, which was given a T5 rating.

Continuing on to Dundonald Road, less severe roof damage was found, along with further debris across the road which was rated at T3. Toward Queen’s Park, damage became less severe, though several trees had fallen or lost large branches. Several homes lost roof tiles along Kingswood Avenue, Dunmore Road, and Carlisle Road, becoming markedly less severe toward Paddington Old Cemetery, where damage appeared to cease after a 2.5-kilometre (1.6 mi) track.

== Aftermath ==
The London Fire Brigade and structural surveyors assessed the damage and structural safety of affected properties. In the meantime, several hundred people were displaced from their homes until they had been declared safe for their occupants to return. Brent London Borough Council announced that none of the affected properties were likely to be demolished, though a total of 29 homes were declared as unfit for habitation due to the damage caused by the tornado.

== See also ==
- List of European tornadoes and tornado outbreaks
- Tornadoes of 2006
- 1981 United Kingdom tornado outbreak
