= TORRO =

English weather service

Tornado and Storm Research Organisation
- Abbreviation: TORRO
- Founded: 1974
- Founder: Dr. Terence Meaden
- Type: Non-profit
- Location: Newcastle upon Tyne, England
- Region served: British Isles
- Fields: Meteorology, Climatology
- Volunteers: 400 volunteers
- Website: torro.org.uk
- Formerly called: Tornado Research Organisation

The Tornado and Storm Research Organisation (TORRO) was founded by Terence Meaden in 1974. Originally called the Tornado Research Organisation, it was expanded in 1982 following the inclusion of the Thunderstorm Census Organisation (TCO) after the death of its founder Morris Bower and his wife. The current Head of TORRO is Paul Knightley, a professional meteorologist.

TORRO comprises nearly 400 members in the United Kingdom and others from around the world, from amateurs to professional meteorologists, and almost 30 staff. TORRO maintains a large storm spotter network throughout the British Isles and collects and records reports of severe weather.

TORRO carries out research on many aspects of severe weather including ball lightning, blizzards & heavy snowfall, coastal impacts, hailstorms, lightning impacts, tornadoes, thunderstorms, weather disasters, and weather & health.

Tornadoes in the UK are classified using the T-scale. TORRO has also developed a hailstorm intensity scale.

TORRO publishes the semi-professional periodical the International Journal of Meteorology (IJMet) which is composed of a mixture of academic and amateur articles.

TORRO tornado watches and warnings are now released to the public via the TORRO forecast page, the TORRO forum, the TORRO Facebook page, and the UKweatherworld weather forum.

Bi-annual conferences are held, usually in March and October. At these, various presentations are given on all aspects of weather, especially severe weather. In the Spring conference, the staff present annual reviews of the previous year's severe weather, and severe weather forecasts. These are also published in the IJMet.

== See also ==
- Met Office
