= TORRO scale =

Scale for rating tornado intensity

The TORRO tornado intensity scale (or T-Scale) is a scale measuring tornado intensity between T0 and T11. It was proposed by Terence Meaden of the Tornado and Storm Research Organisation (TORRO), a meteorological organisation in the United Kingdom, as an extension of the Beaufort scale.

== History and derivation from Beaufort scale ==
The scale was tested from 1972 to 1975 and was made public at a meeting of the Royal Meteorological Society in 1975. The scale sets T0 as the equivalent of 8 on the Beaufort scale and is related to the Beaufort scale (B), up to 12 on the Beaufort scale, by the formula:

B = 2 (T + 4)

and conversely:

T = B/2 - 4

Beaufort scale	B	8	10	12	14	16	18	20	22	24	26	28	30
TORRO scale	T	0	1	2	3	4	5	6	7	8	9	10	11

The Beaufort scale was first introduced in 1805, and in 1921 quantified. It expresses the wind speed as faster than v in the formula:

v = 0.837 B^{3/2} m/s

== TORRO scale formula ==
Most UK tornadoes are T6 or below with the strongest known UK tornado estimated as a T9 (the 1666 Lincolnshire tornado). For comparison, the strongest detected winds in a United States tornado (during the 1999 Oklahoma tornado outbreak) would be T11 using the following formulas:

v = 2.365 (T+4)^{3/2} m/s
v = 8.511 (T+4)^{3/2} km/h
v = 5.289 (T+4)^{3/2} mph
v = 4.596 (T+4)^{3/2} kn

where v is wind speed and T is TORRO intensity number. Wind speed is defined as a 3-second gust at 10 m AGL.

Alternatively, the T-Scale formula may be expressed as:

v = 0.837 (2T+8)^{3/2} m/s

or

v = 0.837(2^{3/2}) (T+4)^{3/2} m/s
or
$$T = (v/2.365) ^{2/3}-4$$

== Rating process and comparisons to Fujita scale ==
TORRO claims it differs from the Fujita scale in that it is "purely" a wind speed scale, whereas the Fujita scale relies on damage for classification, but in practice, damage is utilised almost exclusively in both systems to infer intensity. That is because such a proxy for intensity is usually all that is available, although users of both scales would prefer direct, objective, quantitative measurements. The scale is primarily used in the United Kingdom whereas the Fujita scale has been the primary scale used in North America, continental Europe, and the rest of the world.

At the 2004 European Conference on Severe Storms, Dr. Meaden proposed a unification of the TORRO and Fujita scales as the Tornado Force or TF Scale. In 2007 in the United States, the Enhanced Fujita Scale replaced the original Fujita Scale from 1971. It made substantial improvements in standardizing damage descriptors through expanding and refining damage indicators and associated degrees of damage, as well as calibrated tornado wind speeds to better match the associated damage. However, the EF Scale, having been designed based on construction practices in the United States, is not necessarily applicable across all regions. The EF-scale and variants thereof are officially used by the United States, Canada, France, and Japan, as well as unofficially in other countries, such as China.

Unlike with the F scale, no analyses have been undertaken at all to establish the veracity and accuracy of the T scale damage descriptors. The scale was written in the early 1970s, and does not take into account changes such as the growth in weight of vehicles or the great reduction in numbers and change of type of railway locomotives, and was written in an environment where tornadoes of F2 or stronger are extremely rare, so little or no first-hand investigation of actual damage at the upper end of the scale was possible. The TORRO scale has more graduations than the F scale which makes it arguably more useful for tornadoes on the lower end of the scale; however, such accuracy and precision are not typically attainable in practice. Brooks and Doswell stated that "the problems associated with damage surveys and uncertainties associated with estimating wind speed from observed damage make highly precise assignments dubious". In survey reports, Fujita ratings sometimes also have extra qualifications added ("minimal F2" or "upper-end F3 damage"), made by investigators who have experience of many similar tornadoes and relating to the fact that the F scale is a damage scale, not a wind speed scale.

Tornadoes are rated after they have passed and have been examined, not whilst in progress. In rating the intensity of a tornado, both direct measurements and inferences from empirical observations of the effects of a tornado are used. Few anemometers are struck by a tornado, and even fewer survive, so there are very few in-situ measurements. Therefore, almost all ratings are obtained from remote sensing techniques or as proxies from damage surveys. Weather radar is used when available, and sometimes photogrammetry or videogrammetry estimates wind speed by measuring tracers in the vortex. In most cases, aerial and ground damage surveys of structures and vegetation are utilised, sometimes with engineering analysis. Also sometimes available are ground swirl patterns (cycloidal marks) left in the wake of a tornado. If an on site analysis is not possible, either for retrospective ratings or when personnel cannot reach a site, photographs, videos, or descriptions of damage may be utilised.

== TORRO scale parameters ==
The 12 categories for the TORRO scale are listed below, in order of increasing intensity. Although the wind speeds and photographic damage examples are updated, which are more or less still accurate. However, for the actual TORRO scale in practice, damage indicators (the type of structure which has been damaged) are predominantly used in determining the tornado intensity.

Scale	Wind speed (Estimated)			Damage intensity	Example of potential damage
Scale	mph	km/h	m/s	Damage intensity	Example of potential damage
T0	39 - 54	61 - 86	17 - 24	Light damage	Loose light litter such as paper, leaves and twigs raised from ground level in spirals. Wheelie bins tipped and rolled. Secured tents and marquees seriously disturbed. Garden furniture and pots disturbed. A few exposed tiles/slates on roofs dislodged. Twigs snapped; weak small branches in leaf snapped from some trees; minimal or no damage to bare trees. Trail visible through crops.
T1	55 - 72	87 - 115	25 - 32	Mild damage	Deckchairs, plants in small pots, heavy litter become airborne. Minor damage to sheds. More serious/numerous dislodging of tiles, slates and chimney pots with some tiles/slates blown off roofs of typical construction. Low quality wooden fences damaged or flattened. Slight damage possible to low-lying shrubs/bushes, particularly of the evergreen variety. Moderate damage to trees, with a few medium-sized branches in leaf snapped on the upper bound of T1; bare trees remain mostly unscathed except for significant twig breakage, though a few small branches may be snapped. Very weak/unhealthy trees, particularly those in leaf and of softwood variety such as conifers, may be partially or completely uprooted.
T2	73 - 92	116 - 147	33 - 41	Moderate damage	Heavy mobile homes displaced with some damage to exterior. Light caravans lose majority of roof and/or are blown over, particularly from upper bound winds of T2. Bonnets blown open on some vehicles. Garden sheds destroyed. Greenhouses of weak/average construction lose entire plastic/glass roofing cover with total collapse of some structures. Garage roofs torn away; some to significant damage to tiled roofs and chimney stacks with many tiles missing, particularly to those with poor attachments. Thatched roofs with small eaves/smooth surfaces typically suffer minor damage. Outbuildings lose entire roofs and suffer some structural damage. Guttering and some other exterior fixtures damaged or pulled from some houses; siding damage possible. Older single glazed windows blown in or out of frames or smashed. Significant damage to most tree types, some large branches twisted or snapped off. Most small and shallow rooted trees uprooted or snapped.
T3	93 - 114	148 - 184	42 - 51	Strong damage	Mobile homes overturned / badly damaged; light caravans severely damaged or destroyed. Garages and weak outbuildings severely damaged or destroyed. House roof timbers considerably exposed; strongly built brick masonry houses suffer major roof damage; chimney's may topple or collapse. Windows may be broken, especially from flying debris. Most large healthy trees lose many large branches; many snapped or uprooted. Lighter cars flipped.
T4	115 - 136	185 - 220	52 - 61	Severe damage	Cars briefly levitated and/or displaced short distances. Mobile homes / lighter caravans airborne / destroyed. Sheds obliterated and airborne for considerable distances. Entire roofs removed from some houses; roof timbers of stronger brick or stone masonry houses completely exposed; gable ends torn away. Weak-framed wooden houses suffer significant structural damage; those with poor anchorage may be shifted on/off foundations. Numerous strong trees snapped or uprooted; all trees within the damage path suffer some debranching.
T5	137 - 160	221 - 259	62 - 72	Intense damage	Heavier vehicles overturned or overturned and displaced some distance; with minimal levitation. Wind turbines built from strong materials suffer significant blade damage with blades shredded or broken; permanent deformation of tower possible from winds on the upper bounds of T5. Weak-framed wooden houses largely or completely destroyed. Strong-framed wooden houses and weak brick masonry houses suffer significant structural damage; failure of some second floor walls. Stronger brick masonry houses may lose several rows of bricks on second floor walls; the roof mostly or entirely blown or torn off. Larger masonry buildings have large sections of roof blown or torn off with partial upper-floor wall collapse. The oldest, weakest buildings may collapse entirely.
T6	161 - 186	260 - 299	73 - 83	Moderately-devastating damage	Strong-framed wooden houses severely damaged or destroyed. Strongly built brick masonry houses lose entire roofs and second floor walls. More of the less-strong buildings collapse completely. Windows broken on skyscrapers along with significant damage to building envelope. National Grid pylons severely damaged, bent and deformed, or blown down. Strong trees that remain standing suffer major debranching with most leaves torn off; all but the widest and strongest trees are snapped or uprooted. Trains derailed / blown over while in motion.
T7	187 - 212	300 - 342	84 - 95	Strongly - devastating damage	Strong-framed wooden houses and weak brick masonry houses wholly demolished. Strongly built stone / brick masonry houses suffer severe structural damage or are destroyed entirely. Skyscrapers suffer severe damage to building envelope and may have localised structural deformations. Steel-framed warehouse-type constructions severely damaged or destroyed. Other large well constructed steel-framed buildings badly damaged. Steel-reinforced concrete buildings suffer total roof loss; some structural damage possible. Stationary trains blown over. All large branches torn/stripped from trees down to the trunk. Noticeable debarking of any standing tree trunks from flying debris.
T8	213 - 240	343 - 385	96 - 107	Severely - devastating damage	Cars and other larger/heavier vehicles hurled great distances. Wooden-framed houses and their contents dispersed over long distances. Most well-constructed large masonry buildings severely damaged; large portions collapsed. Steel reinforced concrete buildings suffer major structural damage. Skyscrapers suffer severe structural deformations and may show a visible lean to one side.
T9	241 - 269	386 - 432	108 - 120	Intensely -devastating damage	Large well-built steel-framed buildings demolished. Steel reinforced concrete buildings severely compromised with partial structural collapse. Locomotives or trains blown over and rolled a short distance from tracks with damage to their exterior; empty train cars flipped and rolled repeatedly some distance away from tracks with some levitation. Complete debarking of any standing tree-trunks.
T10	270 - 299	433 - 482	121 - 134	Super damage	Entire very well built buildings torn from foundations and carried a large distance to disintegrate. Steel-reinforced concrete buildings suffer near-total structural failure with major collapse.
T11	>300	>483	>135	Phenomenal damage	Exceptionally well-built thick-walled (40-80cm) masonry buildings completely destroyed and swept from their foundations; foundations may be damaged or have sections pulled away entirely. Well-built steel-reinforced concrete buildings completely destroyed. Tall buildings collapse. Cars, trucks and train cars thrown in excess of 1 mile. Only the most specialized structures—low to the ground with specific aerodynamic designs and extremely thick, load-bearing steel-reinforced concrete walls with no windows/discernible roof—may remain after a tornado of this strength. Survival would be reliant on these specialized structures or being out of the path of the tornado itself.

T0	T1	T2	T3	T4	T5	T6	T7	T8	T9	T10	T11
Weak				Strong				Violent			

== See also ==
- Saffir-Simpson Hurricane Scale
- Tornado intensity and damage
- Wind engineering
- List of tornadoes and tornado outbreaks
- 1764 Woldegk tornado (only tornado to be rated T11 as of 2026)
