= Llancaiach railway station =

Disused railway station in Nelson, Caerphilly and Llancaiach, Caerphilly

Llancaiach

General information
- Location: Llancaiach, Caerphilly; Wales
- Coordinates: 51.6549°N 3.2828°W
- Platforms: 2

Other information
- Status: Disused

History
- Original company: Newport, Abergavenny and Hereford Railway
- Post-grouping: Great Western Railway

Key dates
- 11 January 1858: Opened
- 1 July 1912: Closed
Location

Llancaiach railway station was originally opened by the Newport, Abergavenny and Hereford Railway on the Taff Vale Extension which later amalgamated with the Great Western Railway between Pontypool and Quakers Yard. The station served the village of Nelson and the hamlet of Llancaiach in the county borough of Caerphilly from 1858 to 1912, when a more modern station was built.

== History ==
Llancaiach started off as nothing more than fields and possibly Roman settlements along with Llancaiach Fawr, the Tudor Manor house once owned by the Prichard Family and visited by Charles I of England. A branch line of the former Taff Vale Railway was built from a junction between Pontypridd and Abercynon that climbed a 1 in 8 gradient using an incline plane, it used gravity to haul loaded wagons down and empty wagons up to connect the nearby village of Nelson, Caerphilly and the Llancaiach Colliery and later to Gelligaer Colliery and Tophill Colliery.

When the Taff Vale Extension opened in 1858 by the Newport, Abergavenny and Hereford Railway connecting Pontypool and Quakers Yard with the Vale of Neath Railway and the Taff Vale Railway, Llancaiach Railway Station was opened to serve the nearby farms and villages along with Nelson, Caerphilly and Llancaiach Fawr along with adjacent farms. On January 10th 1876, the Taff Bargoed Line was opened by the Rhymney Railway to connect with the Taff Vale Extension and the Taff Vale Railway at Nelson, Llancaiach Railway Station would see more service with goods and passenger trains between Dowlais, Quakers Yard and Pontypool along with Nelson on the Taff Vale.

In 1912, Nelson and Llancaiach railway station was built, the new station was positioned about a quarter of a mile closer to Trelewis in a much wider area. The station at Nelson and Llancaiach was a great improvement to the old Llancaiach station, another access road was built to reach it and the facilities were greatly improved. It consisted of three platforms, and a goods yard while a footbridge was constructed across the top of the station and this also give access to a footpath to Llancaiach; the station buildings were made from red brick and both passengers and freight dealers benefited greatly from the new station.

Passengers could get trains to Neath, Pontypool, Cardiff, Dowlais, Aberdare and all stations along those routes. Lots of freight passed through including coal and cattle and the large goods yard provided local traders with goods from all parts of the UK.

== Location ==
The station was originally located straight ahead of Station Terrace east of Tawelfan.
