= Llancaiach =

Wales hamlet

Coordinates: 51°39′27″N 3°17′02″W

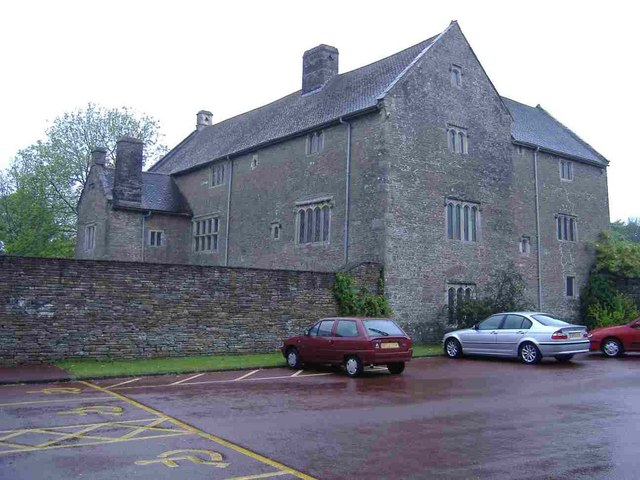
House in Llancaich

Llancaiach is a hamlet just north of the village of Nelson, Caerphilly, Wales. It is close to Llancaiach Fawr Manor, a Tudor manor house and living history museum.

== Railway history ==
A station was opened by the Newport, Abergavenny and Hereford Railway on 11 January 1858, later replaced by a much modern station in 1912 by the Rhymney Railway. Nelson and Llancaiach railway station was opened on July 1, 1912, replacing the original Llancaiach station. It was situated on what is now the neighbourhood of Tawelfan, the station was closed June 15th 1964 and demolished.

Preceding station	Historical railways	Following station
Llancaiach; Line open, station closed	Rhymney Railway	Hengoed High Level; Line and station closed
