= On Such a Night =

On Such a Night may refer to:

- On Such a Night (1937 film), an American drama film directed by Ewald André Dupont
- On Such a Night (1955 film), a British short comedy film directed by Anthony Asquith
- On Such a Night, a 1947 novel by Anthony Quayle
