= Hanging Judge (play) =

1952 play

- Written by: Raymond Massey
- Original language: English
- Genre: Crime drama

Premiere
- Date premiered: 25 August 1952
- Place premiered: Manchester Opera House

Hanging Judge is a 1952 crime play by the Canadian-British actor Raymond Massey. It first appeared at the Manchester Opera House before transferring to the New Theatre in London's West End where it ran for 94 performances from 23 September to 13 December 1952. It is based on the 1948 novel Let Him Have Judgement by Brian Hamilton. The West End cast included Godfrey Tearle, Jane Griffiths, Henry Caine, Denis Shaw, Julian Somers, Jack Melford, John Robinson, James Raglan, Bartlett Mullins, Peter Williams, Frederick Treves and John Le Mesurier. It was directed by Michael Powell, best known as a filmmaker.

== Television adaptations ==
The play was adapted for the American television show Climax! in 1956 and the British show Armchair Theatre in 1958, with Massey playing the title role in both.

== Bibliography ==
- Howard, James. Michael Powell. Batsford, 1996.
- Wearing, J.P. The London Stage 1950–1959: A Calendar of Productions, Performers, and Personnel. Rowman & Littlefield, 2014.
