= Strange Experiences =

English television series, 1955–1962

- Genre: Crime, Drama, Fantasy, horror
- Starring: Peter Williams; Peter Sallis; Theodore Bikel; John Wood; Elspet Gray; Josephine Griffin; Arthur Howard
- Country of origin: England
- No. of series: 1
- No. of episodes: 29

Production
- Producer: Derick Williams
- Production location: England
- Running time: 5 Minutes
- Production company: Associated Television

Original release
- Network: ITV
- Release: 24 September 1955 – 15 June 1962

Strange Experiences is a British fantasy, horror TV series starring Peter Williams as a storyteller who talks about the strange things that have happened during his life. The series aired on ITV from 24 September 1955 to 15 June 1962. The series also included performances from Peter Sallis, Michael Shepley, Theodore Bikel, John Wood, Elspet Gray, Hugh Latimer, Josephine Griffin, Arthur Howard, and Ian Whittaker.

== Plot ==
A storyteller named Peter talks about the strange events that have happened during his daily life routine such as uncanny, supernatural or otherwise "strange" goings-on happening across every place he has visited in England.

== Cast ==
- Peter Williams as Peter the Storyteller
- Peter Sallis as Squishy Taylor, Chippy Criggs, Poor Man
- Theodore Bikel as Man
- John Wood as Man
- Elspet Gray as Querella
- Josephine Griffin as Women
- Arthur Howard as Man
- Ian Whittaker as Dora's Son
- Anna Turner as Women
- Frederick Treves as Man
- Michael Balfour as Man
- David Oxley as Man

== Episodes ==
The series ran for a total of 29 episodes that aired on ITV, Associated Television from 24 September 1955 to 15 June 1962. All the episodes of this series survive. 22 of the episodes are available to watch at the British Film Institute and additionally selected episodes are available to view on YouTube.

No.	Title	Original release date
1	"The Pickpocket"	24 September 1955
2	"The Identical Twins"	1 October 1955
3	"Portrait of Paula"	8 October 1955
4	"Hold-Up Man"	15 October 1955
5	"The Sleepwalker"	22 October 1955
6	"Halloween"	29 October 1955
7	"Two-Faced Murder"	5 November 1955
8	"Fortune Teller"	12 November 1955
9	"The Sleeping Girl"	19 November 1955
10	"Queer Customer"	26 November 1955
11	"Grandpa's Portrait"	3 December 1955
12	"Safe and Sound"	1 January 1956
13	"The Trial"	8 January 1956
14	"Kleptomaniac"	15 January 1956
15	"The Knife Thrower"	22 January 1956
16	"Old Silas"	29 January 1956
17	"The Well"	5 February 1956
18	"The Clocks"	12 February 1956
19	"The Laughing Clown"	19 February 1956
20	"The Writing in the Sky"	26 February 1956
21	"The Mirror"	4 March 1956
22	"The Ventriloquist"	11 March 1956
23	"The Inveterate Gambler"	25 March 1956
24	"The Idol"	1 April 1956
25	"A Matter of Luck"	8 April 1956
26	"Dunkirk"	15 April 1956
27	"The Talisman"	22 April 1956
28	"The Unknown Warrior"	29 April 1956
29	"The Comet"	15 June 1962

== Production ==
Before the series premiered two of the episodes from the series were shown in the 1955 TV movie/TV play Fcb TV Show No.1. The episodes "Safe and Sound" and "The Knife Thrower" were shown in the TV movie/TV play to give some idea of how an evening's viewing might appear on the forthcoming I.T.A. channel in London. Both of the episodes where eventually given a separate release on television by themselves for the series Strange Experiences.

== Critic reviews ==
The series itself received very positive ratings and reviews from critics with one critic calling it a good but strange series.

== Home release ==
Two of the episodes have been released on DVD or Blu Ray: "Grandpa's Portrait" and "Old Silas" were included on a British Film Institute DVD and Blu Ray titled Short Sharp Shocks Volume 3 which was released on 9 October 2023.
