= Peter Williams (actor, born 1915) =

American actor (1915–2003)

- Born: 28 April 1915; New Orleans, Louisiana, U.S.
- Died: 29 August 2003 (aged 88); East Sussex, England
- Occupations: Actor; Major in British Army
- Years active: 1948–1980 (film and television)

Peter Brian Gordon Williams (28 April 1915 – 29 August 2003) was an American-born British film, theatre and television actor. He is best known for his role as private detective Don Carter in the long-running British crime series Shadow Squad in the late 1950s. He was married to Helen "Toto" Irving, and had two children. He died on 29 August 2003, at the age of 88.

== Selected filmography ==
=== Film ===
- Ruth (1948) - Boaz
- Brass Monkey (1948) - Detective Fellows
- Bless 'Em All (1948) - Army Doctor (uncredited)
- The Straw Man (1953) - Inspector Conrad
- Footsteps in the Fog (1955) - Constable Farrow
- The Ladykillers (1955) - Detective at Parcels Office (uncredited)
- Richard III (1955) - Messenger to Hastings
- The Man Who Never Was (1956) - Adm. Mountbatten (uncredited)
- Private's Progress (1956) - Officer at Selection Board (uncredited)
- The Man Who Knew Too Much (1956) - Police Sergeant at Albert Hall (uncredited)
- The Bridge on the River Kwai (1957) - Captain Reeves
- Dunkirk (1958) - Officer at Ramsey's H.Q. (uncredited)
- On the Beach (1959) - Prof. Jorgensen (uncredited)
- Two Letter Alibi (1961) - Charles Hilary
- Ankokugai No. 1 (1963)
- Go Kart Go (1964) - Race Official (uncredited)
- Crooks in Cloisters (1964) - Daytripper (uncredited)

=== Television ===
- Strange Experiences (1955–1962) - The Storyteller
- Shadow Squad (1957-1959) - Don Carter
- Ivanhoe (1958) - Gerald
- Pathfinders in Space (1960) - Professor Wedgwood
- Barnaby Rudge (1960) - Mr. Haredale
- City Beneath the Sea (1962) - Captain Payne
- The Human Jungle (1963) - General Sir Ayrland Fielding
- Gideon's Way (1965) - Control Tower Supervisor
- Redcap (1966) - Asst. Provost Marshall
- Man in a Suitcase (1968) - Thomas Halliday
- The Champions (1968) - Minder (uncredited)
- The Main Chance (1970-1972) - Edward Stainer
- Pretenders (1972) - Mandevil
- I, Claudius (1976) - Silius Caecina
- Enemy at the Door (1978) - Vicar

== Selected stage work ==
- Daphne Laureola - Old Vic & Broadway (1949 & 1950)
- Henry V - Stratford (1951)
- Hanging Judge (1952)

== Bibliography ==
- Paul Cornell, Martin Day & Keith Topping. The Guinness Book of Classic British TV. Guinness, 1996.
- Bernard Sendall. Independent Television in Britain: Origin and foundation, 1946-62. Macmillan, 1982.
