= Room in the House =

- Directed by: Maurice Elvey
- Written by: Alfred Shaughnessy
- Based on: play Bless This House by Eynon Evans
- Produced by: Alfred Shaughnessy
- Starring: Patrick Barr; Hubert Gregg; Marjorie Rhodes
- Cinematography: Gerald Gibbs
- Edited by: Robert Jordan Hill (as Robert Hill)
- Music by: Edwin Astley
- Production company: Act Films Ltd
- Distributed by: Monarch Film Corporation (UK)
- Release date: July 1955 (UK)
- Running time: 74 minutes
- Country: United Kingdom
- Language: English

Room in the House is a 1955 British second feature ('B') comedy-drama film directed by Maurice Elvey and starring Patrick Barr, Hubert Gregg and Marjorie Rhodes. The film's screenplay, by Alfred Shaughnessy, is based on Eynon Evans's 1954 play Bless This House. The film was produced by Shaughnessy for Act Films Ltd.

== Plot ==
Ageing widow Betsy Richards stays with each of her three sons in turn, to find out who she'd prefer to spend the rest of her days with. When her favorite, Hugh, leaves for America, she becomes distressed. Finally, the sons rally round and buy Betsy her own cottage in the village.

== Cast ==
- Patrick Barr as Jack Richards
- Hubert Greggas Hugh Richards
- Marjorie Rhodes as Betsy Richards
- Leslie Dwyer as Benji Pugh
- Rachel Gurney as Mary
- Margaret Anderson as Christine
- Josephine Griffin as Julia
- Helen Shingler as Ethel
- Anthony Marlowe as David Richards

== Reception ==
The Monthly Film Bulletin wrote: "Screen version of an unsophisticated, often naive play of a kind which appears to be a speciality of E. Eynon Evans. Although there are a few lively moments in the last of the story's three episodes, the entertainment generally is very tame. Performances range, somewhat disconcertingly, from eminently presentable to extremely indifferent." Kine Weekly wrote: "The picture, which tells three closely related stories, neatly gathers up its threads at the finish. Marjorie Rhodes never ceases to make her presence felt and typifies most homely, well-meaning mothers-in-law as Betsy, and the supporting cast is popular. Here and there both the acting and the direction are exaggerated, but more is gained than lost by the bold dotting of i's and crossing of t's."

Picture Show wrote: "Pleasant and bright family comedy ... Well directed and acted."

In British Sound Films: The Studio Years 1928–1959 David Quinlan rated the film as "mediocre", writing: "Rhodes is good, but makeshift comedy isn't much."
