= The Extra Day =

1956 British film by William Fairchild

- Theatrical release poster
- Directed by: William Fairchild
- Written by: William Fairchild
- Produced by: E.M. Smedley Aston (as Smedley Aston)
- Starring: Richard Basehart; Simone Simon; George Baker
- Cinematography: Arthur Grant
- Edited by: Bernard Gribble
- Music by: Philip Green
- Color process: Colour
- Production company: William Fairchild Productions
- Distributed by: British Lion Films
- Release date: 25 June 1956
- Running time: 83 minutes
- Country: United Kingdom
- Language: English
- Box office: £83,383 (UK)

The Extra Day (also known as Twelve Desperate Hours and 12 Desperate Hours) is a 1956 British comedy-drama film directed by William Fairchild and starring Richard Basehart, Simone Simon and George Baker.

== Plot ==
After the final scene of a film is lost by the driver taking it to the printing lab, the cast and extras have to be rounded up for it to be re-shot. This proves to be quite an endeavour. The director, German exile Kurt Vorn, sends several people out to gather the required actors, who are mainly in theatres.

Meanwhile Ronnie, a new Sinatra-style crooner, sings to crowds of adoring girls. His girlfriend Toni struggles to cope with this, until he announces to his adoring fans that he is going to marry her. The public proposal pushes Joe into also proposing, which is met with a slap on the face.

However, once all are assembled, the driver Harry returns with a battered film canister, saying the reshoot is not needed after all.

== Cast ==
- Richard Basehart as Joe Blake
- Simone Simon as Michele Blanchard
- George Baker as Steven Marlow
- Josephine Griffin as Toni Howard
- Sid James as Barney West
- Beryl Reid as Beryl
- Charles Victor as Bert
- Dennis Lotis as Ronnie Baker
- Shani Wallis as Shirley
- Colin Gordon as Sir George Howard
- Laurence Naismith as Kurt Vorn
- Joan Hickson as Mrs. West
- David Hannaford as Buster West
- Eddie Byrne as Robin
- Olga Lindo as Mrs. Bliss
- Philip Ray as Mr. Bliss
- Jill Bennett as Susan
- Bryan Forbes as Harry
- Gerald Harper as policeman

== Critical reception ==
The Monthly Film Bulletin wrote: "The episodes here are casually linked together, and the film rejects what might have been a promising subject – a film extra's real experiences – unambitiously to pursue its series of comic and sentimental anecdotes. The script leans heavily on situation 'gimmicks', few of them unfamiliar, the social placing of the characters is somewhat shaky, and an experienced cast is given little room to manoeuvre. It seems an odd, and perhaps unconscious, comment on the British film scene that the film within a film should employ a European director, American assistant director and French star."

In British Sound Films: The Studio Years 1928–1959 David Quinlan rated the film as "good", writing: "Nice idea; entertaining though very fragmented."

Leslie Halliwell said: "Thin excuse for portmanteau drama, only amusing in its depiction of a British movie being made with mostly foreign talent."
