= Elspeth March =

English actress (1911–1999)

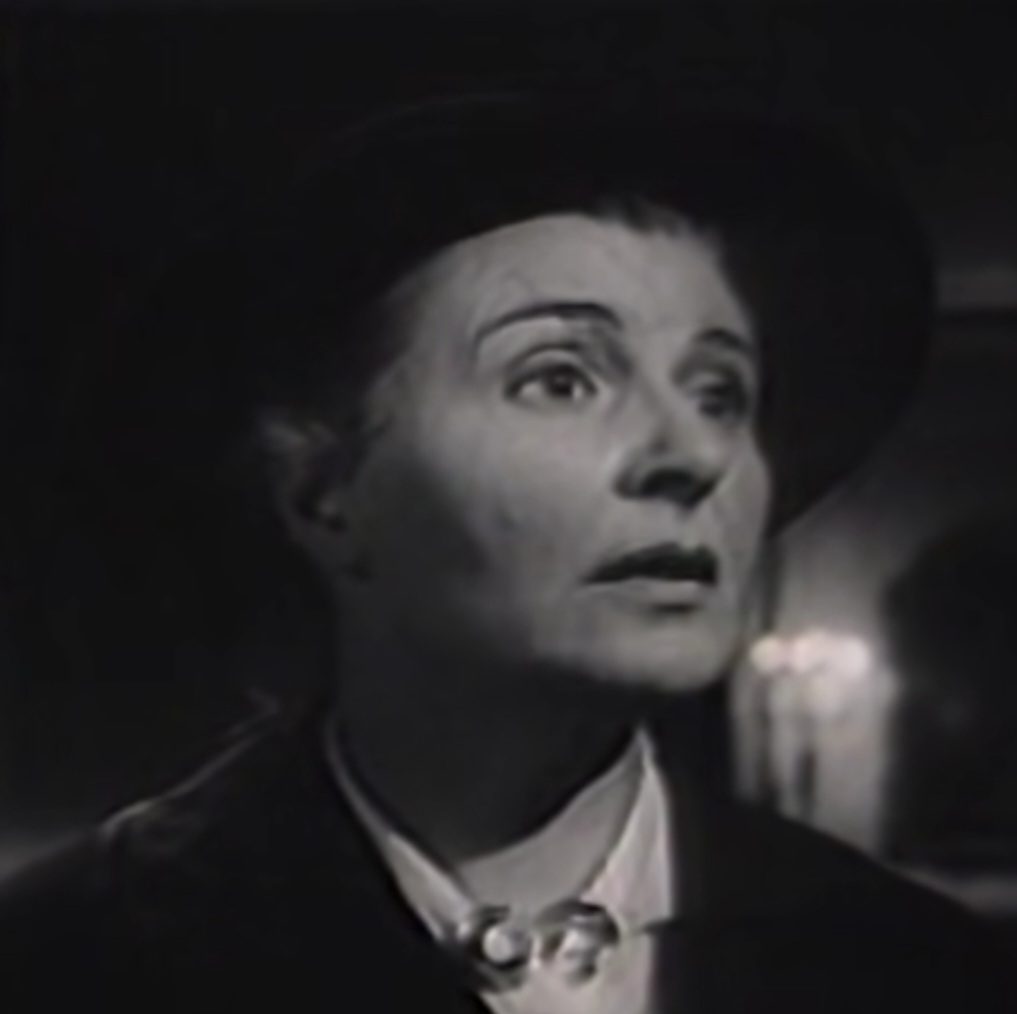
- March in an episode of One Step Beyond (1961)
- Born: Jean Elspeth Mackenzie; 5 March 1911; Kensington, London, England
- Died: 29 April 1999 (aged 88); Northwood, Greater London, England
- Occupation: Actress
- Spouse: Stewart Granger (m. 1938; div. 1948)
- Children: 2

Elspeth March (5 March 1911 – 29 April 1999) was an English actress.

== Early years ==
March was born as Jean Elspeth Mackenzie in Kensington, London, England, the daughter of Harry Malcolm and Elfreda Mackenzie. She studied speech and drama under Elsie Fogerty at the Central School of Speech and Drama, then based at the Royal Albert Hall, London.

== Career and marriage ==
She led a long stage, film and television career as a character actress, making her professional debut in Jonah and the Whale at London's Westminster Theatre in 1932. She met and married actor Stewart Granger in 1938. As his film career blossomed, the marriage faltered, and the couple divorced in 1948. They had two sons, Jamie, and the theatrical agent Lindsey Granger, who died in 2011.

She resumed her career in 1944, continuing to play supporting roles in plays, films and television into her eighties. She appeared with the National Theatre in 1977, playing roles in The Madras House and Don Juan Comes Back from the War, and in 1983 was in the thriller Underground in Toronto and at the Prince of Wales Theatre, London.

== Death ==
March died at Denville Hall in Hillingdon, London, on 29 April 1999, aged 88.

== Filmography ==
- Mr. Emmanuel (1944) as Rose Cooper
- Ruth (1948) as Naomi
- Boys in Brown (1949) as Mrs. Smith
- The Astonished Heart (1950) as Vicar's Wife in Play (voice, uncredited)
- Quo Vadis (1951) as Miriam
- His Excellency (1952) as Fernando's Wife
- The Miracle (1959) as Sister Dominica
- Midnight Lace (1960) as Woman
- The Roman Spring of Mrs Stone (1961) as Mrs. Barrow
- Follow That Man (1961) as Astrid Larsen
- The Playboy of the Western World (1962) as Widow Quin
- Dr. Crippen (1962) as Mrs. Jackson
- The Three Lives of Thomasina (1963) as Thomasina (voice)
- Psyche 59 (1964) as Mme. Valadier
- Don't Lose Your Head (1966) as Lady Binder (uncredited)
- Woman Times Seven (1967) as Annette (in episode "Funeral Procession")
- A Dandy in Aspic (1968) as Lady Hetherington
- Two Gentlemen Sharing (1969) as Mrs. Burrows, Ethne's Mother
- Goodbye, Mr. Chips (1969) as Mrs. Summersthwaite
- Carry On Again Doctor (1969) as Hospital Board Member
- Twinky (1970) as Secretary (uncredited)
- The Rise and Rise of Michael Rimmer (1970) as Mrs. Ferret
- Promise at Dawn (1970) as Fat Woman
- The Magician of Lublin (1979) as Yadwiga
- Charlie Muffin (1979) as Mrs. Heiderman

== Television credits ==
- Caesar's Friend (1939) - Mary a woman of Magdala
- Douglas Fairbanks Jr. Presents (1956) (two episodes) - Lucy / Mrs. Marks
- The Court of Last Resort (1958) - Minnie Bowers
- Hallmark Hall of Fame (1957–58) (two episodes)
- Alfred Hitchcock Presents (1960) (Season 5 Episode 35: "The Schartz-Metterklume Method") - Mrs. Wellington
- Alcoa Presents: One Step Beyond (1961) (three episodes) - Mrs. Murphy
- The Saint (1962–64) (two episodes) - Tante Ada / Lucy Wexall
- Softly, Softly (1966) (one episode) - Dora
- Two in Clover (1969) (one episode) - Miss Plummer
- W. Somerset Maugham's The Three Fat Women of Antibes (1969) (one episode) - Beatrice Richman
- Rebecca (1979) (TV miniseries,1 episode) - Mrs. van Hopper
- Let There Be Love (1982-1983) (TV Series) - Mother
- Tales of the Unexpected (1983) (one episode) - Mrs. Carson
- Agatha Christie's Partners in Crime (1984) (one episode) - Lady Susan Clonray
- Executive Stress (1987) - Patricia Fairchild (Donald’s mother)
- The Casebook of Sherlock Holmes (1993) (one episode: The Eligible Bachelor) - Lady Blanche (final appearance)
