= Trelewis Halt railway station =

Disused railway station in Trelewis, Merthyr Tydfil

Coordinates: 51.6654°N 3.2950°W

Trelewis Halt

General information
- Location: Trelewis, Glamorgan; Wales
- Platforms: 2

Other information
- Status: Disused

History
- Original company: Great Western Railway
- Post-grouping: Great Western Railway

Key dates
- 9 July 1934: Opened
- 15 June 1964: Closed
Location

Trelewis Halt railway station served the village of Trelewis in the historic county of Glamorgan, Wales, from 1934 to 1964 on the Great Western Railway.

== History ==
The station was opened on 9 July 1934 by the Great Western Railway. It was situated on a main road next to Ffaldcaiach Bridge. It closed on 15 June 1964.

Preceding station	Historical railways	Following station
Quakers Yard High Level; Line and station closed	Great Western Railway	Nelson and Llancaiach; Line open, station closed
