= Nelson and Llancaiach railway station =

Disused railway station in Nelson, Caerphilly and Llancaiach, Caerphilly

Nelson and Llancaiach
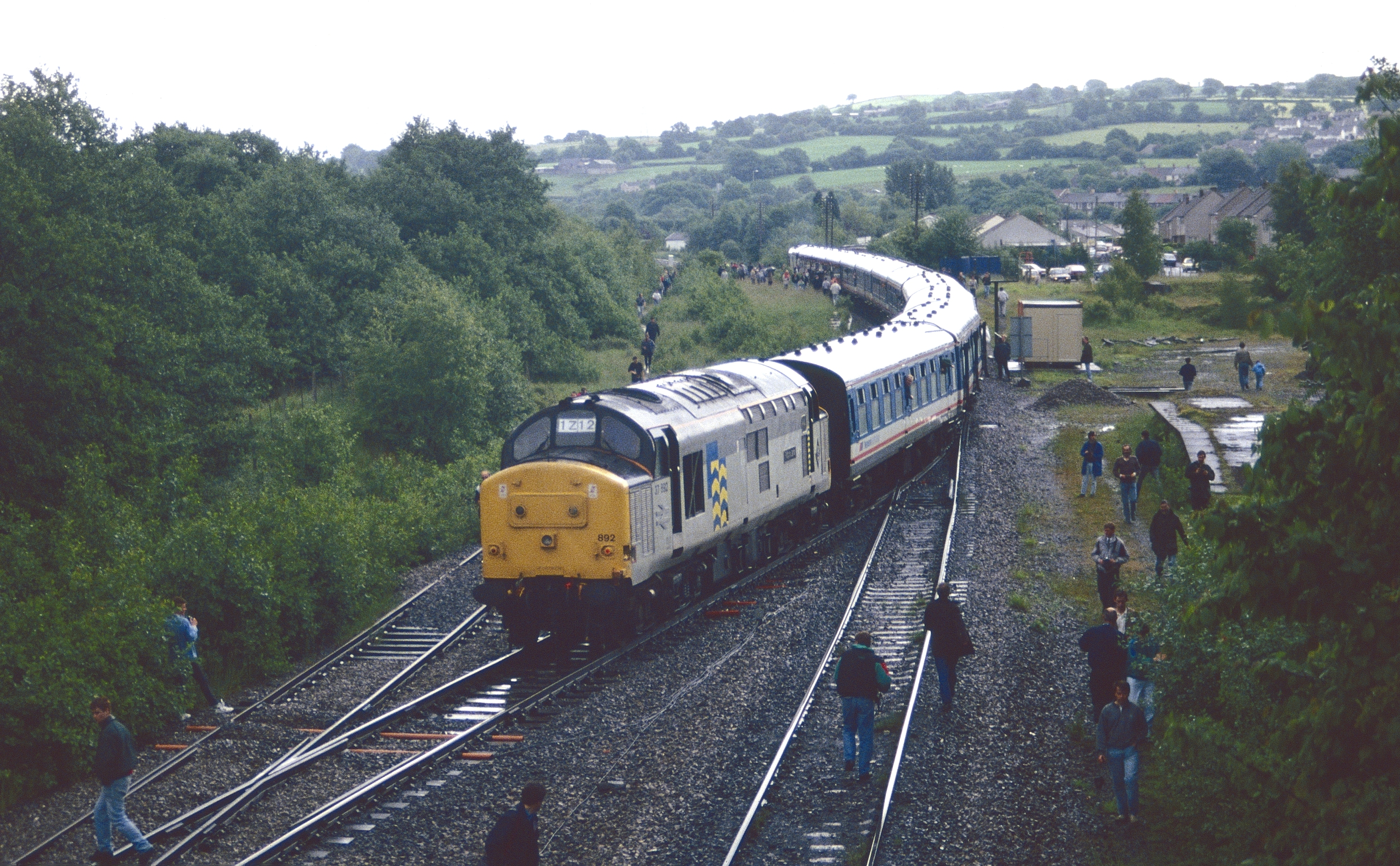
- Exhibition trip in 1991

General information
- Location: Nelson; Llancaiach, Caerphilly; Wales
- Coordinates: 51.6566°N 3.2865°W
- Grid reference: ST111960
- Platforms: 2

Other information
- Status: Disused

History
- Original company: Rhymney Railway
- Pre-grouping: Rhymney Railway
- Post-grouping: Great Western Railway; British Railways (Western Region)

Key dates
- 1 July 1912: Opened
- 15 June 1964: Closed
Location

Nelson and Llancaiach railway station served the village of Nelson and the hamlet of Llancaiach in the historic county of Caerphilly, Wales, from 1912 to 1964 on the Rhymney Railway.

== History ==
The station opened on 1 July 1912 by the Rhymney Railway, replacing the adjacent Llancaiach station. It was situated on the north side of the neighbourhood of Tawelfan. It closed on 15 June 1964. The platforms still exist.

Preceding station	Historical railways	Following station
Trelewis Platform; Line open, station closed	Rhymney Railway	Llanbradach; Line and station open
Trelewis Halt; Line and station closed	Newport, Abergavenny and Hereford Railway (Taff Vale Extension)	Hengoed High Level; Line and station closed
