= The Man Who Never Was =

1956 film directed by Ronald Neame

- DVD cover
- Directed by: Ronald Neame
- Screenplay by: Nigel Balchin
- Based on: The Man Who Never Was (1953 book) by Ewen Montagu
- Produced by: André Hakim
- Starring: Clifton Webb; Gloria Grahame; Robert Flemyng; Stephen Boyd
- Cinematography: Oswald Morris
- Edited by: Peter Taylor
- Music by: Alan Rawsthorne
- Production company: Sumar Film Productions; 20th Century Fox
- Distributed by: 20th Century Fox
- Release dates: 14 February 1956 (San Francisco, premiere); 15 March 1956 (UK)
- Running time: 103 minutes
- Country: United Kingdom; United States
- Language: English

The Man Who Never Was is a 1956 war thriller film directed by Ronald Neame and starring Clifton Webb, Gloria Grahame, Robert Flemyng, Josephine Griffin, and Stephen Boyd. It is based on the 1953 book by Lt Cmdr Ewen Montagu (played in the film by Webb) and chronicles Operation Mincemeat, a 1943 British intelligence plan to deceive the Axis powers into thinking the Allied invasion of Sicily would take place elsewhere in the Mediterranean.

A British and American co-production, The Man Who Never Was was entered into the 1956 Cannes Film Festival, where it was nominated for the Palme d'Or. It received positive reviews from critics. At the 10th British Academy Film Awards, the film won Best Screenplay and was nominated in three other categories, including Best Film and Outstanding British Film.

== Plot ==
In 1943, Royal Navy Lieutenant Commander Ewen Montagu devises a scheme to deceive the Nazis about the impending invasion of Southern Europe. It entails releasing a corpse with a fictional identity off Huelva on the coast of Spain, where strong currents will carry it ashore near where a known German agent operates. The non-existent Royal Marine courier, Major William Martin, would appear to be a plane crash victim carrying documents about an upcoming Allied invasion of German-occupied Greece, rather than Sicily, the more obvious target. Overcoming the reluctance of senior officers, Montagu receives Winston Churchill's approval to execute his plan, known as Operation Mincemeat.

Following a medical expert's advice, Montagu obtains the permission of the deceased's father and procures the body of a man who died of pneumonia, which would give the appearance he had drowned. The corpse is placed in a canister packed with dry ice and transferred to a waiting submarine. The body is released off the Atlantic coast of Spain and washes ashore as intended. Local authorities, observed by German and British consulate staff, identify the body and conduct an autopsy. After the attaché case containing the deceptive documents is returned to London, a forensics expert confirms that the key letter, which describes an Allied invasion of Greece, has been cleverly opened, photographed and resealed.

Hitler is convinced the documents are genuine, though Admiral Wilhelm Canaris, head of the Abwehr, is sceptical. The Germans dispatch to London an Irish spy, Patrick O'Reilly, to investigate. O'Reilly investigates Martin's American "fiancée", Lucy Sherwood, who is the flatmate of Montagu's assistant, Pam. O'Reilly arrives at their flat, posing as Martin's old friend, on the same day Lucy has received news that her real boyfriend was killed in action. Her genuine grief mostly convinces O'Reilly.

As a final test, he gives Lucy his north London address, telling her to contact him if she needs anything. He then radios his German contacts that if he does not send another message in an hour he has been arrested. As Montagu, General Cockburn of Scotland Yard's Special Branch and police officers are en route to O'Reilly's flat, Montagu realises why O'Reilly left his address with Lucy and persuades a reluctant Cockburn to let O'Reilly go. When no one arrests him, O'Reilly sends a "Martin genuine!" radio message. The Germans then transfer most of their Sicily-based forces to Greece, which helps the Allied invasion of Sicily succeed.

After the war Montagu receives several decorations and awards for his wartime service, including being appointed an Officer of the Order of the British Empire (OBE). He visits Spain and leaves his OBE medal at the grave of Major Martin, "the man who never was".

== Cast ==
- Clifton Webb as Lt Cmdr Ewen Montagu
- Gloria Grahame as Lucy Sherwood
- Robert Flemyng as Lt George Acres
- Josephine Griffin as Pam
- Stephen Boyd as Patrick O'Reilly
- Laurence Naismith as Rear Adm. Cross
- William Russell as Joe (Lucy's fiancé)
- Geoffrey Keen as Gen. Archibald Nye
- Moultrie Kelsall as the Father
- Cyril Cusack as Cab driver
- André Morell as Sir Bernard Spilsbury
- Michael Hordern as Gen. Cockburn
- William Squire as submarine commander Bill Jewell
- Allan Cuthbertson as Vice-Admiral
- Miles Malleson as Scientist
- Joan Hickson as Landlady
- Terence Longdon as Larry
- Gibb McLaughlin as Club porter
- Gordon Bell as Customs officer

Uncredited

- Wolf Frees as Admiral Wilhelm Canaris
- Peter Williams as Vice Admiral Mountbatten
- Robert Brown as French
- D.A. Clarke-Smith as British Consul
- François Périer as Embassy clerk
- Peter Sellers as Winston Churchill (voice)

The real Ewen Montagu makes a cameo appearance, that of a Royal Air Force air vice-marshal who has doubts about the feasibility of the proposed plan. It was described by Ben Macintyre as a "surreal" moment when the real Montagu addressed his fictional persona, played by Webb.

== Historical accuracy ==
Operation Mincemeat involved the acquisition and dressing up of a human cadaver as a "Major William Martin, R.M." and using the submarine HMS Seraph to put it into the sea near Huelva, Spain. Attached to the dead body was a briefcase containing fake letters falsely stating that the Allied attack would be against Sardinia and Greece rather than Sicily, the actual point of invasion. When the body was found, the Spanish Intelligence Service passed copies of the papers to the German Intelligence Service which passed them on to their High Command. The ruse was so successful that the Germans still believed that Sardinia and Greece were the intended objectives weeks after the landings in Sicily had begun.

The exact identity of the "man who never was" has been the centre of controversy since the end of the war. On the one hand, certain accounts claim the true identity of "Major William Martin" was a homeless, alcoholic rat-catcher from Aberbargoed, Wales, Glyndwr Michael, who had died by self-administering a small dose of rat poison.

However, in 2002, authors John and Noreen Steele published the non-fictional book The Secrets of HMS Dasher. HMS Dasher was an ill-fated escort carrier that exploded and sank in the Firth of Clyde around the time Operation Mincemeat had commenced. The Steeles argued that "Major Martin's" body was actually that of seaman John Melville, one of the Dasher's casualties. Further, it has been reported that the accuracy of this claim was verified by the Royal Navy in late October 2004, and a memorial service was held for Melville, in which he was celebrated as one whose "memory lives on in the film The Man Who Never Was ... we are gathered here today to remember John Melville as a man who most certainly was." There is some circumstantial evidence that also supports the identity of the body used as being Melville's, attested to as recently as 2022.

Alternatively, in 2010 professor Denis Smyth, a researcher at the University of Toronto, counter-argued that Glyndwr Michael was indeed the real "Major Martin". To support his claims, Smyth published the contents of a secret memo and an official report, both authored by Ewen Montagu, confirming the Glyndwr Michael story.

Regardless of the identity of Major Martin, Nigel Balchin's script stayed as close to the truth as was convenient, yet the film does fall back on some dramatisation. For example, the episode of the Irish spy, O'Reilly, is a complete fabrication. The British Security Service controlled the German spy network in the UK with its Double-Cross System, though this fact was still secret at the time the film was made. Ewen Montagu declared that he was happy with the fictitious incidents which, although they did not happen, might have happened.

The fictional character of Lt George Acres was believed to have been based on Charles Cholmondeley, one of the key players in the operation, whose identity was still a secret at the time of the film's making.

== Production ==
Prior to Ronald Neame's involvement, Nunnally Johnson was attached to write and direct.

Shooting took place on-location in London and Huelva, Spain, and at MGM-British Studios at Elstree. The budget was £227,262 plus the fees of the story rights and producer Hakim and stars Webb and Grahame.

== Reception ==
=== Box office ===
The film earned an estimated $1.1 million in North American receipts in 1956.

=== Critical response ===
The Radio Times wrote, "the picture may appear overly reverent by today's standards. But this is still a crucial wartime spy tale that is well worth watching." On the review aggregator website Rotten Tomatoes, 88% of 8 critics' reviews are positive.

=== Awards and nominations ===
Institution	Year	Category	Nominee	Result	Ref.
British Academy Film Awards	1957	Best Film	—N/a	Nominated	
British Academy Film Awards	1957	Outstanding British Film	—N/a	Nominated	
British Academy Film Awards	1957	Best Screenplay	Nigel Balchin	Won	
British Academy Film Awards	1957	Most Promising Newcomer to Leading Film Roles	Stephen Boyd	Nominated	
Cannes Film Festival	1956	Palme d'Or	Ronald Neame	Nominated	
National Board of Review	1956	Top Ten Films	—N/a	Won	

== The Goon Show parody ==
The BBC's radio comedy show The Goon Show made a send-up of the story of The Man Who Never Was (based on the book) and incorporated most of the regular Goon Show characters. Written by Spike Milligan and Larry Stephens, the first version of the script formed two-thirds of the episode broadcast on 31 March 1953, before the film's release, with the first third comprising a separate sketch. Like most of these early episodes, this no longer exists.

Milligan and Stephens later wrote a full-length version which was broadcast on 20 March 1956. Milligan later revised this script for the episode broadcast on 17 February 1958. Both of the later versions have been issued on CD sets. Peter Sellers (one of the Goons) provided the voice of Winston Churchill in the film, although the character did not appear in the Goon Show adaptation.

== See also ==
- Operation Mincemeat (film) - A 2021 film covering the same subject.
