= Nelson, Caerphilly =

Village in Caerphilly, Wales

Nelson
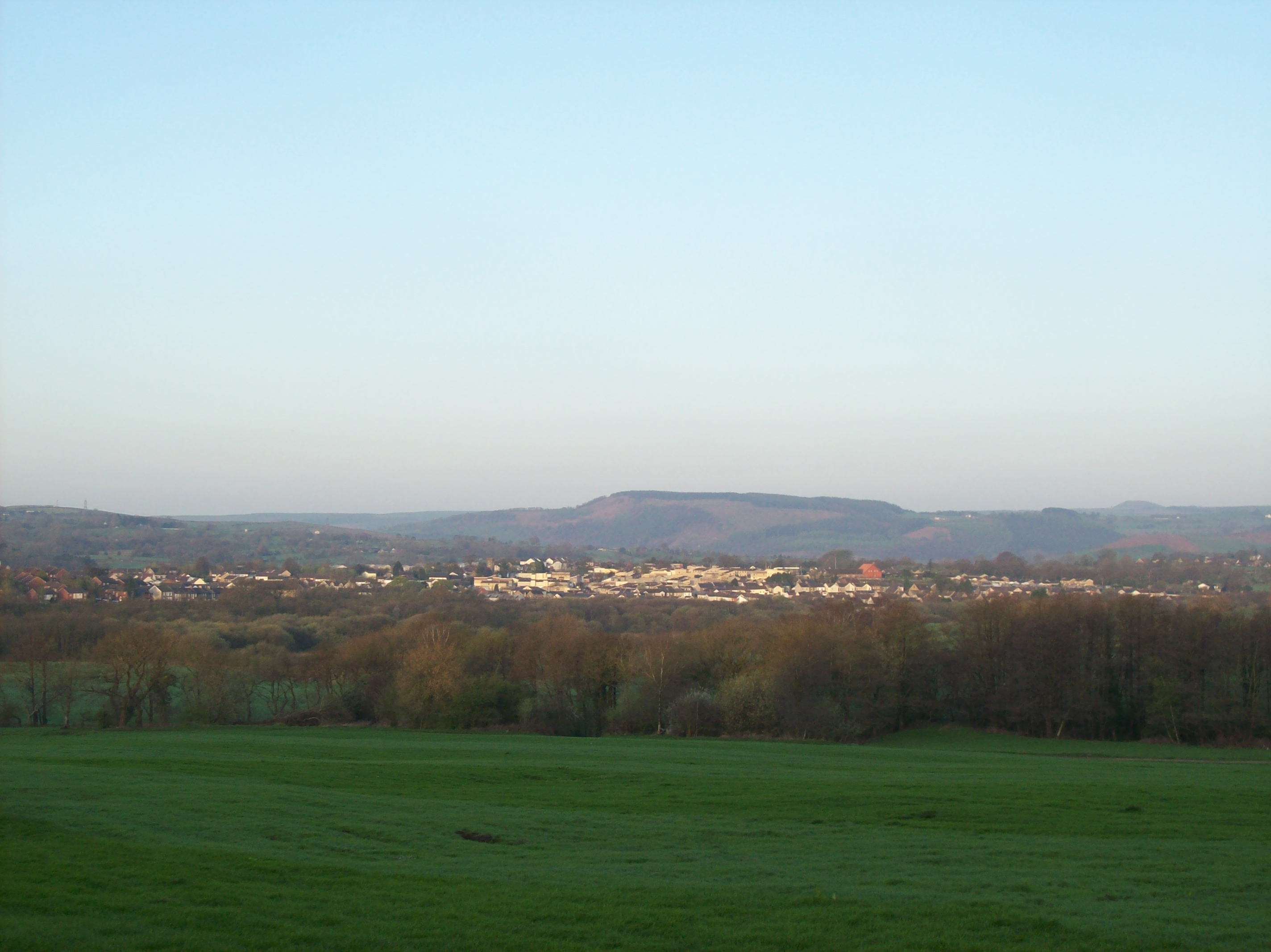
- Nelson, looking west

- Location within Caerphilly
- Population: 4,647 (2011)
- OS grid reference: ST115995
- Principal area: Caerphilly
- Preserved county: Gwent
- Country: Wales
- Sovereign state: United Kingdom
- Post town: Treharris
- Postcode district: CF46
- Dialling code: 01443
- Police: Gwent
- Fire: South Wales
- Ambulance: Welsh
- UK Parliament: Caerphilly
- Senedd Cymru – Welsh Parliament: Caerphilly
- List of places UK Wales Caerphilly 51°39′05″N 3°16′58″W Map of the community

Nelson is a village and community in the County Borough of Caerphilly, Wales. It sits five miles north of Caerphilly and ten miles north of Cardiff, at the lower end of the Taff Bargoed Valley, and lies adjacent to Treharris, Trelewis and Quakers Yard.

== Etymology ==
The area that became Nelson was originally called Ffos y Gerddinen, though this name is not commonly used today. The meaning of this name is often given as ditch/moat of the Rowan Trees but Thomas Morgan translated it as "Mountain Ash Bog".

The English name Nelson derives from the Lord Nelson Inn, a pub which the village grew around, and which gave its name to the railway station and eventually the whole settlement by association. The pub was built while the village was growing in the early 19th century and itself named after Horatio Nelson who visited the area in 1802 or 1803 on his way to inspect the ironworks in Merthyr Tydfil.

=== Controversy ===
In 2020, the Welsh government conducted an audit of names that commemorated slavery or those associated with the slave trade, including Horatio Nelson. However, the audit noted that the village was "named for the adjacent Lord Nelson Inn rather than in intentional commemoration of Nelson."

The audit became the subject of debate in October 2021, when The Daily Telegraph reported the story with criticism from the Secretary of State for Wales, Simon Hart and Member of the Senedd Natasha Asghar who called the audit "pandering to the woke left".

The ongoing coverage led Senedd member for Caerphilly, Hefin David to state that the name would not change "unless the people of Nelson decide it should change." The discussion also led to suggestions that the village should revert to its previous Welsh name Ffos y Gerddinen, with historian Kenneth O. Morgan stating that "I am all in favour of turning their names into the Welsh version, which they have had for centuries."

== History ==
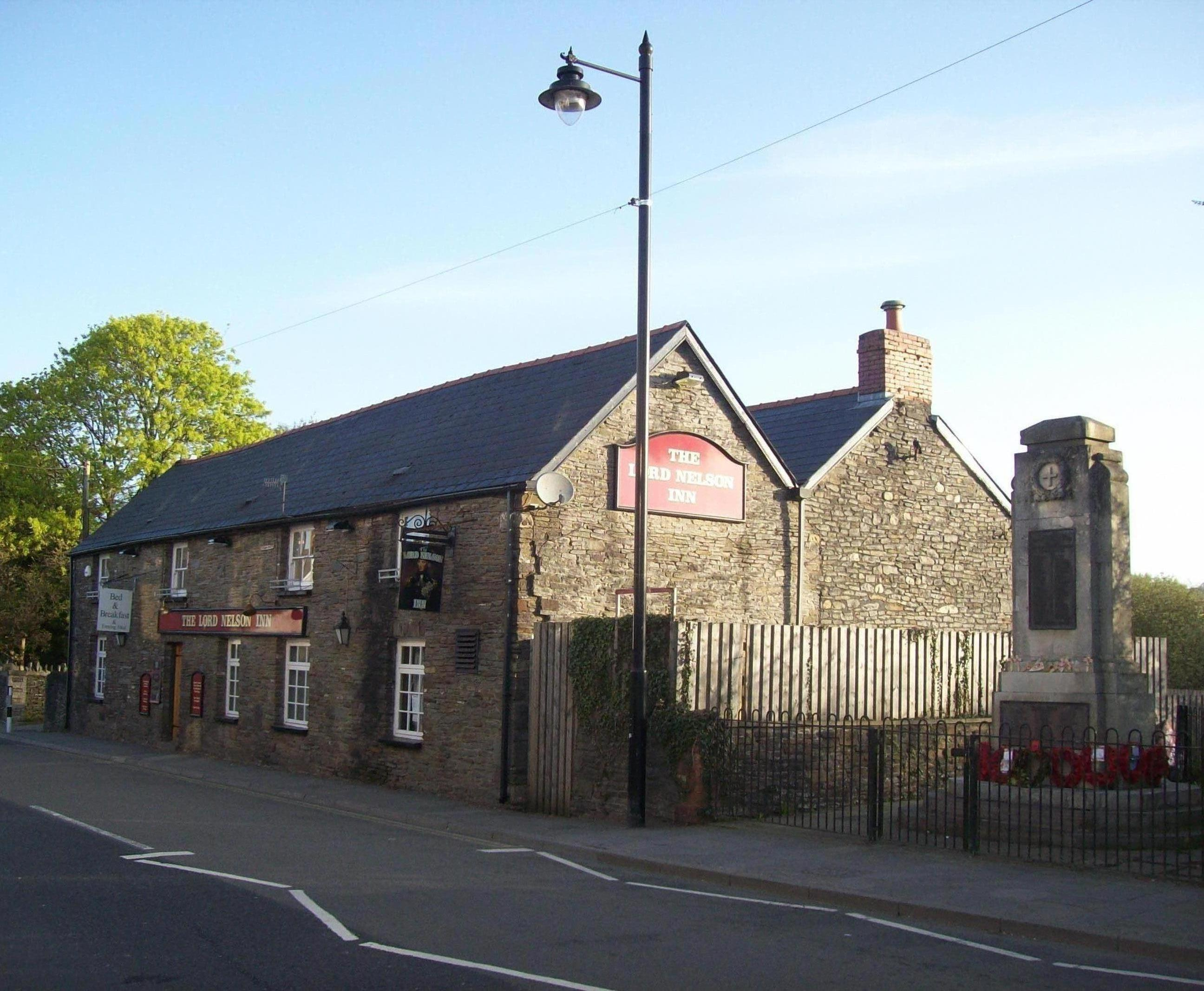
Lord Nelson Inn and war memorial

Ffos-y-Gerddinen was a relatively flat piece of land to the south of the ancient hamlet of Llancaiach, in the Taff Bargoed Valley. The area was on a well known Drovers' road from the South Wales coast towards Merthyr Tydfil and onwards to Brecon and Mid Wales. Had it not been for the development of the South Wales coalfield, the area would have remained as open country. When the Llancaiach Colliery was developed from 1811, it created a need for new housing for the workers and heavy transport for the coal, which spilt onto the flatlands below the colliery.

Freight transport from Merthyr Tydfil had already brought about the development of the Glamorganshire Canal which by-passed Nelson in the nearby Taff Valley, but in 1841 the Taff Vale Railway's Llancaiach Branch was built specifically to service Llancaiach Colliery and entered the Taff Bargoed Valley via the centre of Nelson. Looking for a name for its station, which was built on the flat land south of the colliery, the directors of the TVR chose the name of the coaching inn. When the Taff Vale Extension railway of the Newport, Abergavenny and Hereford Railway was built, it replicated the TVR naming convention for its station, and Nelson was born as a village with a separate identity to Llancaiach.

== Geography ==
Nelson is situated at 150 metres (500 ft) above sea level in a natural basin close to the confluence of the Taff and Taff Bargoed valleys, and the resultant relative flatness and surrounding fields are quite atypical of the steep-sided valleys and linear villages associated with the area. To the south the land rises gently to the 383-metre summit of Mynydd Eglwysilan, which offers panoramic views of the Brecon Beacons, Bristol Channel and the coasts of Devon and Somerset.

To the east of the village lies Nelson Bog, a Site of Special Scientific Interest (SSSI). The bog is host to rare plants and wildlife including orchids, bats, badgers and otters.

Historically, Nelson lies within the county of Glamorgan, although boundary changes in 2003 merged the whole of Caerphilly County Borough with the preserved county of Gwent. The boundary with the county borough of Merthyr Tydfil runs along the northern edge of the village, while the border with Rhondda Cynon Taf passes a mile to the west. The hamlets of Llancaiach and Llanfabon lie to the north and south of Nelson respectively.

== Governance ==
Nelson is also an electoral ward, coterminous with the community boundaries, which elects two councillors to Caerphilly County Borough Council.

Since 1999 it has been part of the Caerphilly constituency for elections to the Welsh Senedd. The constituency for elections to the UK Parliament is also called Caerphilly.

== Notable buildings ==
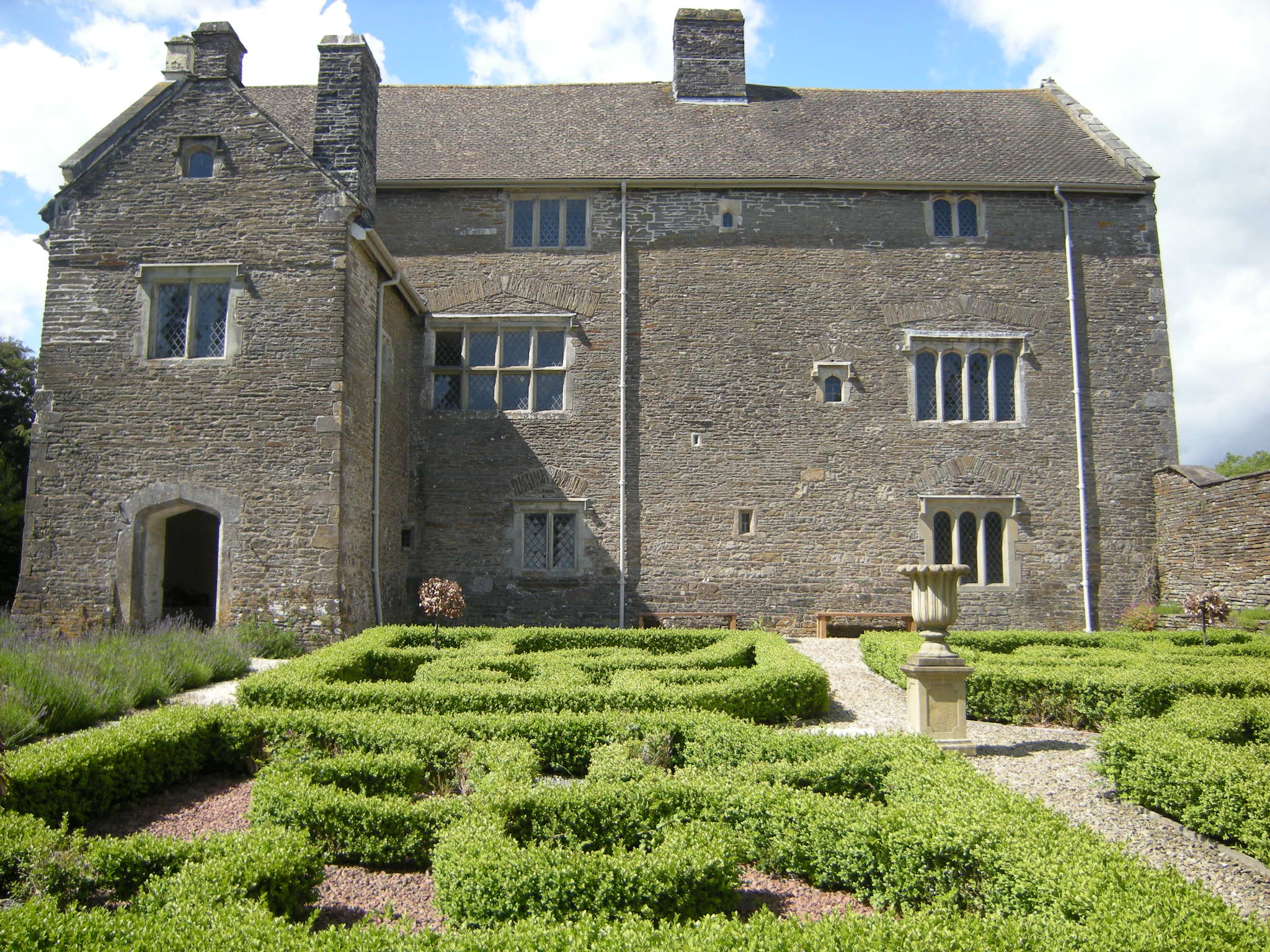
Llancaiach Fawr

Llancaiach Fawr is a 16th-century manor house which lies at the northern end of Nelson. The building is now a living history museum set in the year 1645 at height of the English Civil War, the year in which King Charles I visited the house in an attempt to persuade its owner, Colonel Edward Pritchard, not to switch allegiance to the Roundheads. In spite of this, the colonel joined the Parliamentarian cause some time later. The manor is now reputed to be one of the most haunted buildings in Wales.

An open-air Pêl-Law court stands in the centre of the village and is believed to be the only operating Welsh handball court left in Wales.

Welsh Water's head office is in Nelson.

== Sporting clubs ==
Nelson is home to Nelson RFC, founded in 1934 and Nelson Cavaliers Football Club, founded in 1972. In 2001, the rugby league team Valley Cougars was formed and now plays in the Welsh Premier League.

== Transport ==
Originally created as a result of transport needs for the Llancaiach Colliery, the Taff Vale Railway's Llancaiach Branch serviced only freight needs until the development of the Taff Vale Extension, which brought about the introduction of passenger services from 1862. Nelson's position as a junction station was increased after it was joined by a passenger and freight line to Dowlais on the Taff Bargoed branch which opened in 1876 and closed in 1964. Passenger services from Pontypridd were withdrawn along the Llancaiach Branch from 1932, and the Taff Vale Extension from 1964 as part of the Beeching cuts. The station was demolished in 1972, but a very small part of the TVE Vale Of Neath line still exists to service the freight associated with coal extraction of the Ffos-y-fran Land Reclamation Scheme on the Taff Bargoed branch. Since the closure of its railway stations, the closest railway station to Nelson is two miles away at Ystrad Mynach.

Nelson lies one mile east of the A470 Abercynon roundabout, while the A472 trunk road bypasses the village. Bus services are provided by various companies and exist to the towns of Bargoed, Blackwood, Caerphilly, Merthyr Tydfil, Pontypridd, Treharris and Ystrad Mynach. The direct bus service to Cardiff was discontinued in 2009, with a change at Pontypridd now required.

As part of the South Wales Metro project, rail service to Nelson branching from Ystryd Mynach could be reinstated.

The Taff Trail and route 47 on the National Cycle Network pass near and through Nelson.

== Notable persons ==
Simon Weston, veteran of the British Army who is known for his charity work and recovery from severe burn injuries suffered during the Falklands War, was born in the village.

Eynon Evans (1904-1989), was a writer, actor, and producer. He was known for acting in the radio show Welsh Rarebit, and the lead role in the 1960 adaptation of How Green Was My Valley, he performed many other roles as well. His 1946 play Wishing Well, was later adapted into the 1954 film The Happiness of Three Women, in which he also acted.

Robert Spragg (AKA Larry Love), the singer and songwriter from the band Alabama 3 lived in Nelson before moving to London. His family moved to the village from Merthyr Tydfil and his parents still live there.

Sir Tasker Watkins (1918–2007), was born in Nelson and was a recipient of the Victoria Cross, the highest and most prestigious award for gallantry in the face of the enemy that can be awarded to British and Commonwealth forces. He was successively a High Court judge, Lord Justice of Appeal and Deputy Lord Chief Justice of England. He was President of the Welsh Rugby Union from 1993 to 2004.

== Gallery ==
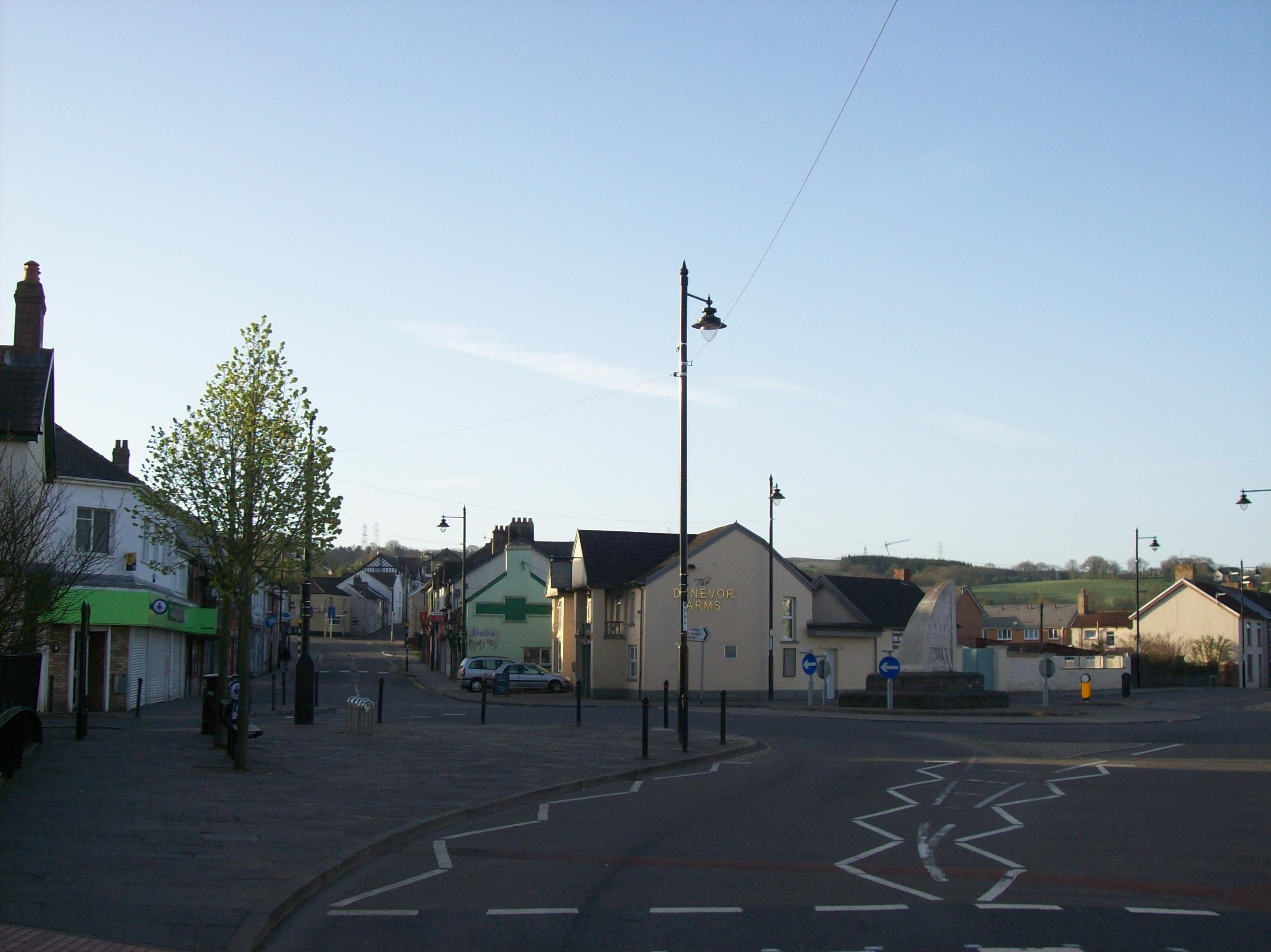
The centre of Nelson

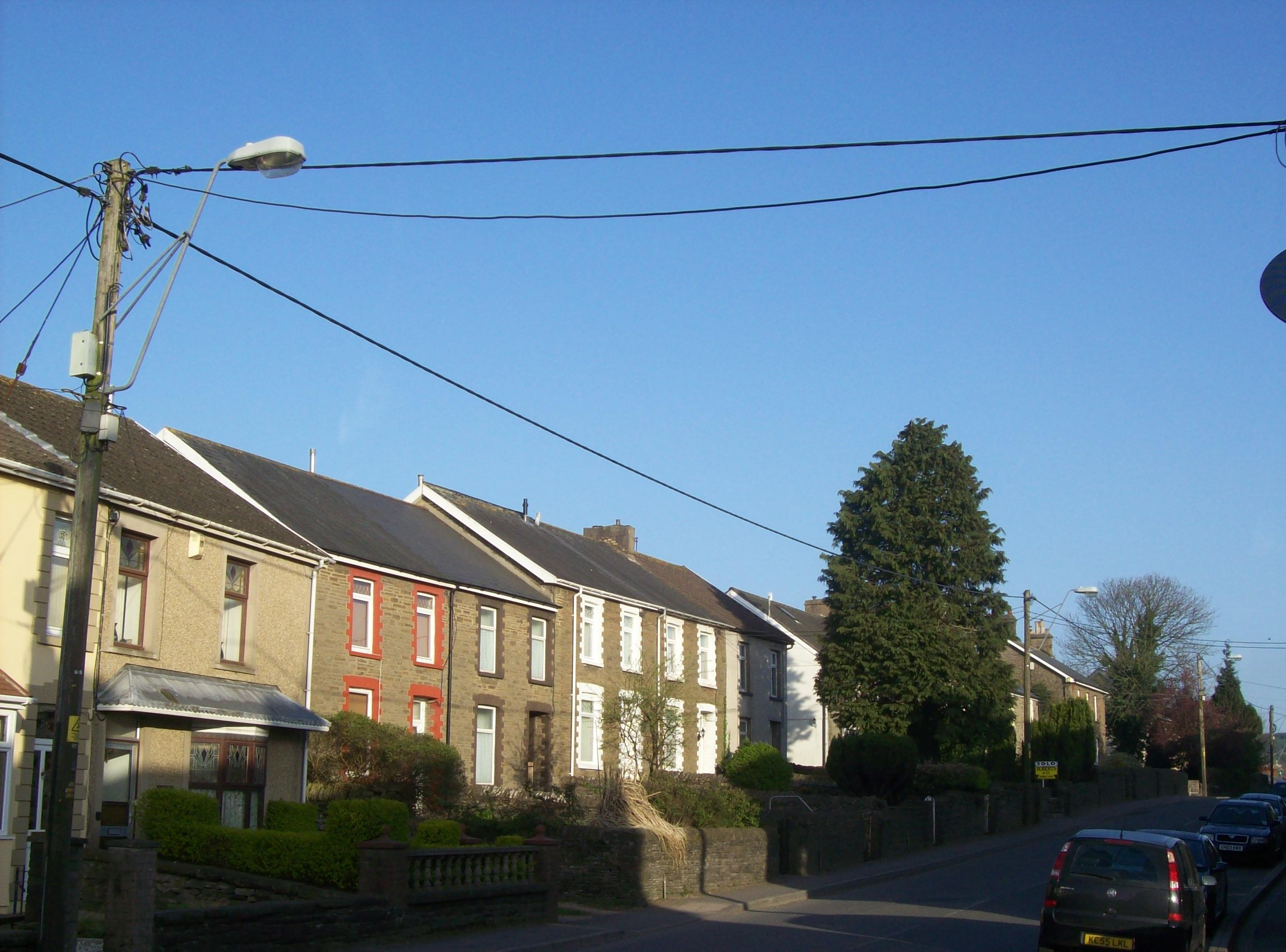
Shingrig Road

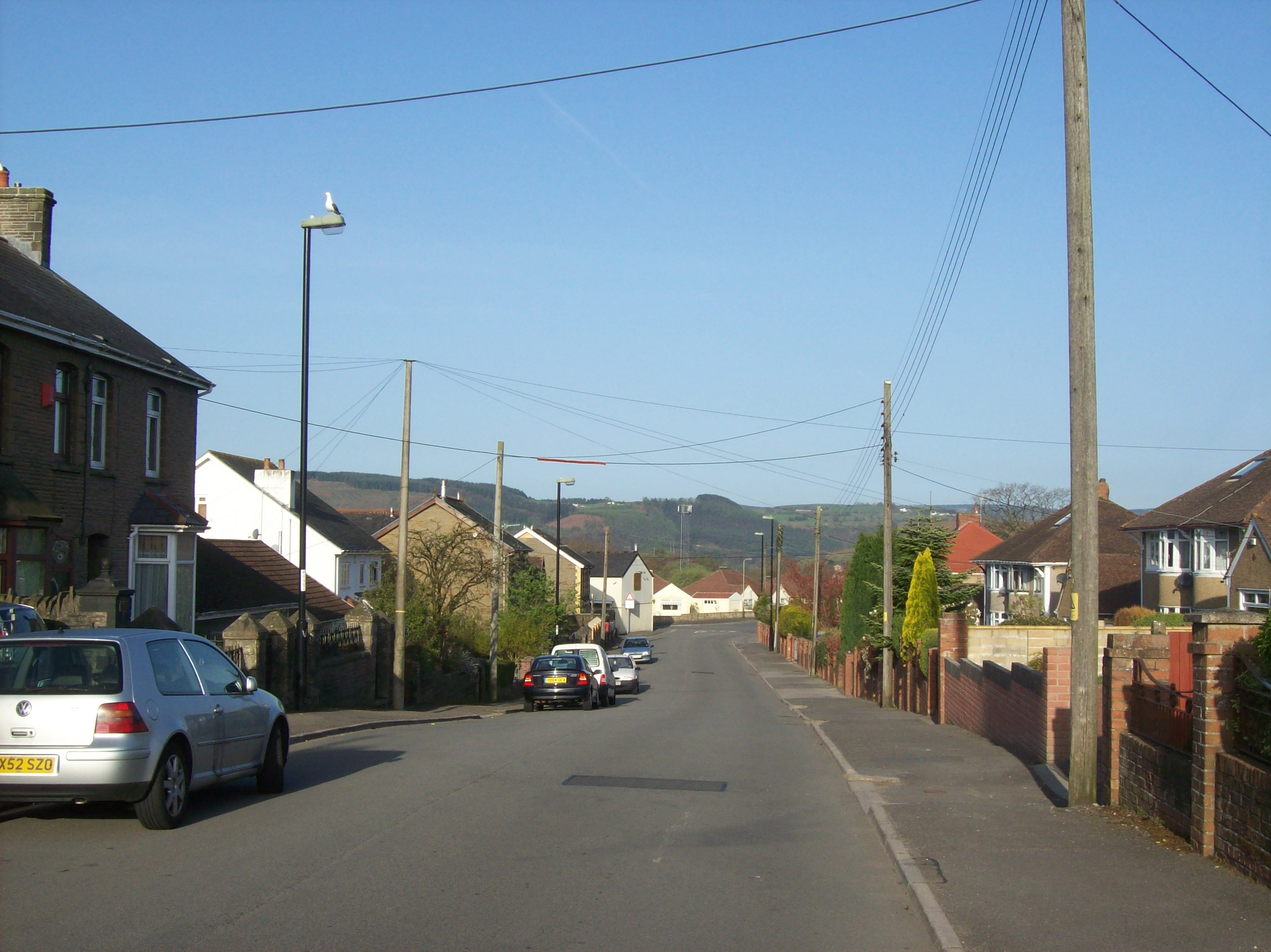
High Street

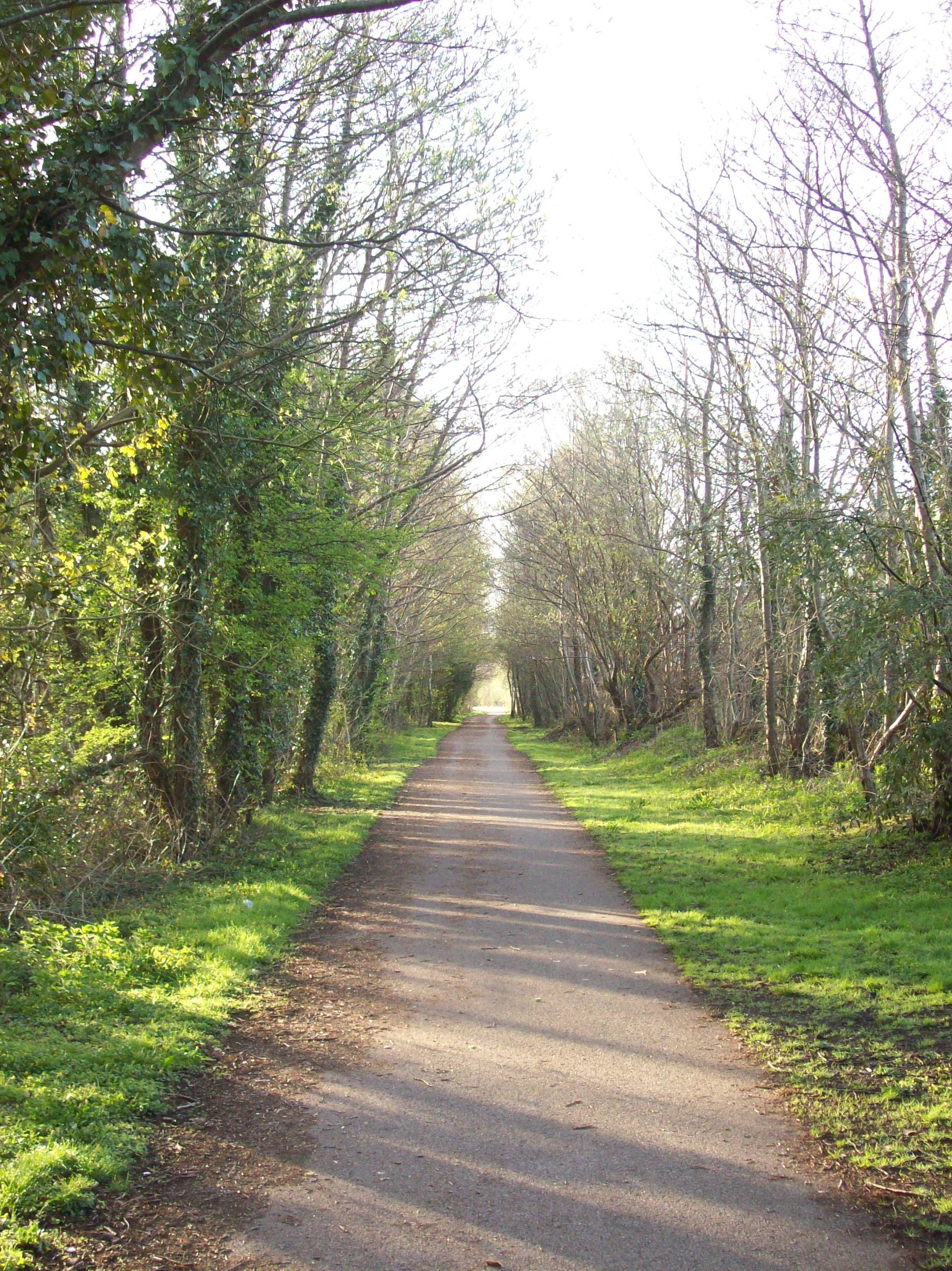
The cycle track passing Nelson

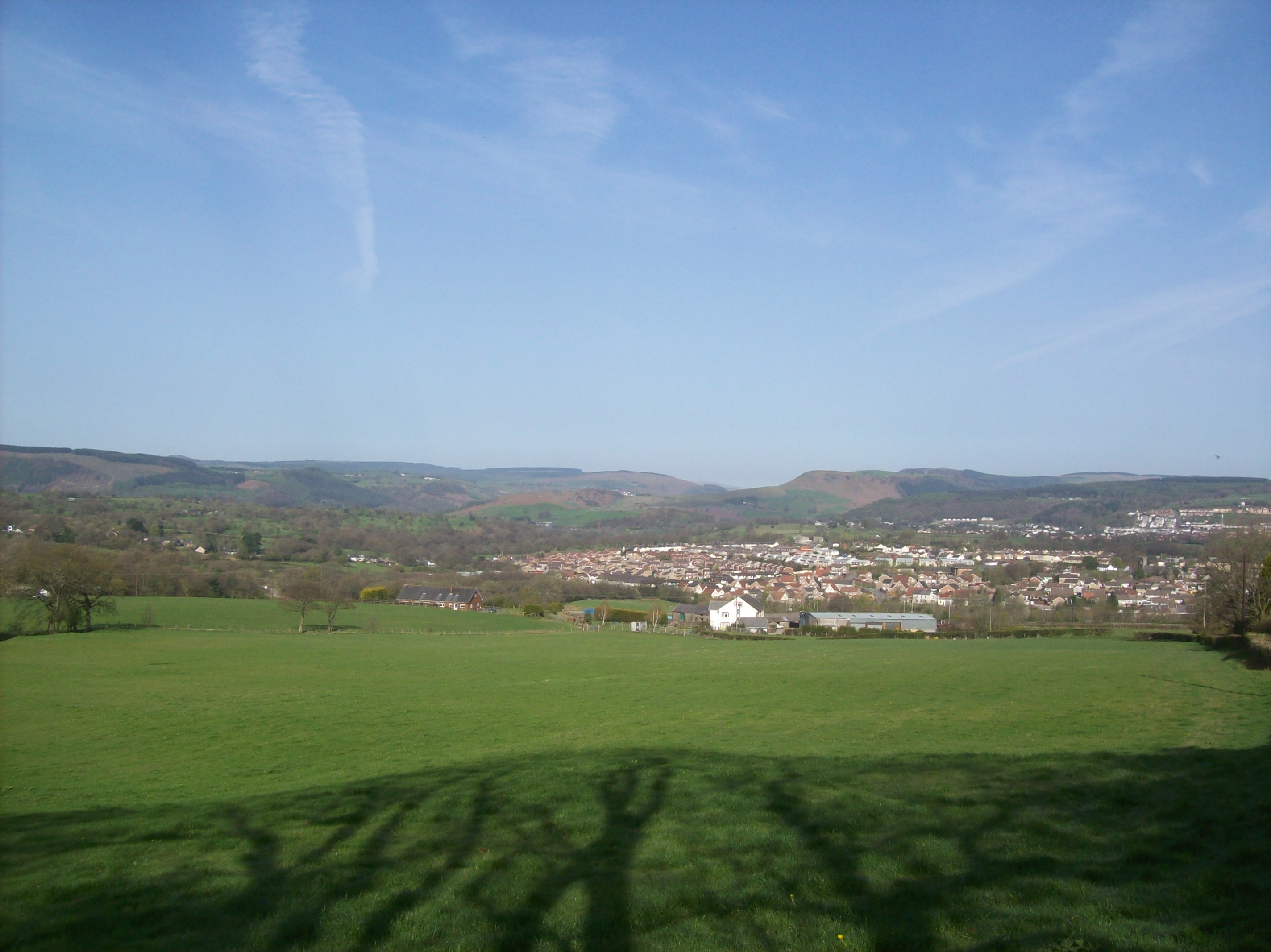
View of Nelson from Mynydd Eglwysilan

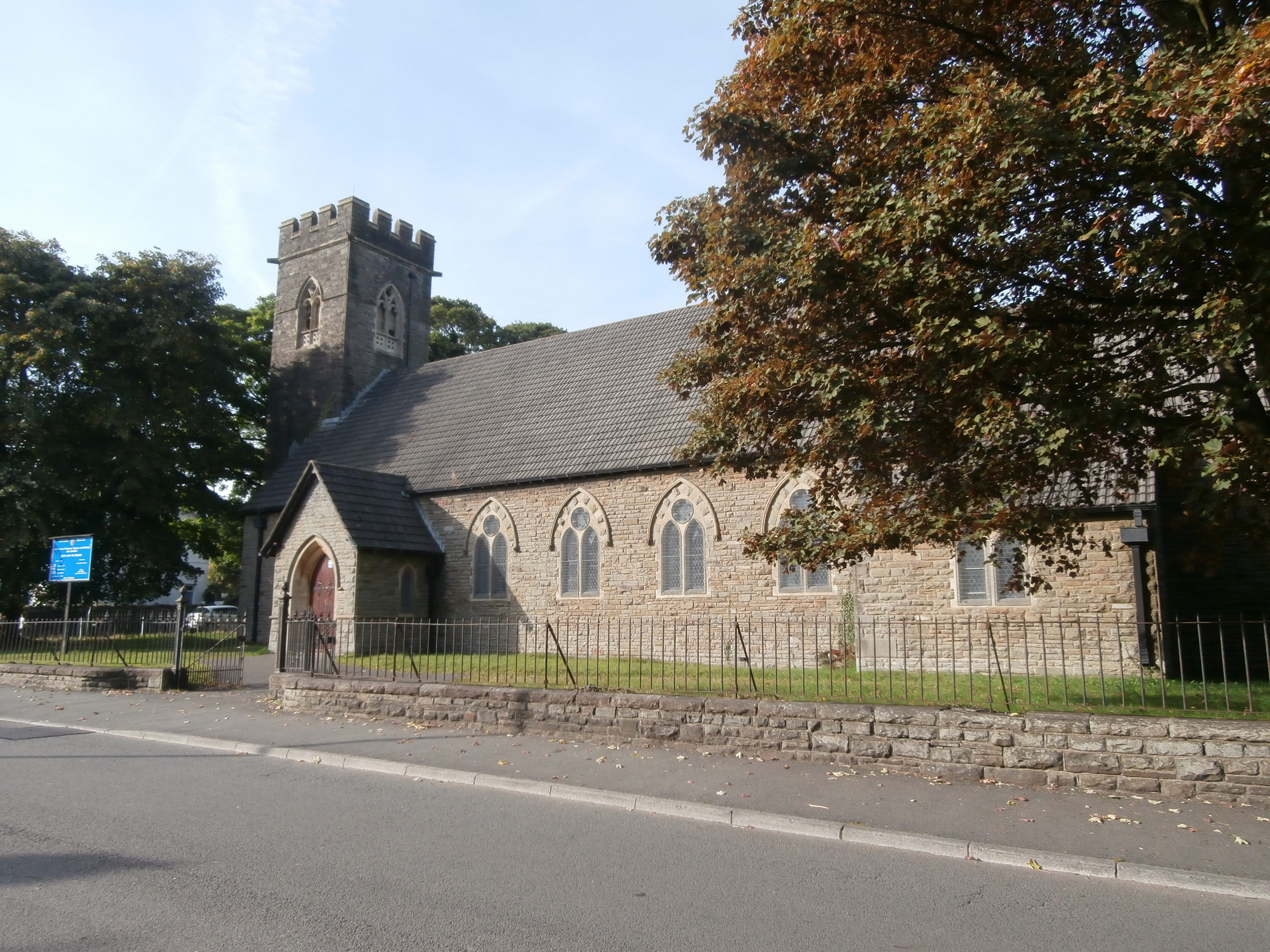
The church of St John the Baptist (Church in Wales)

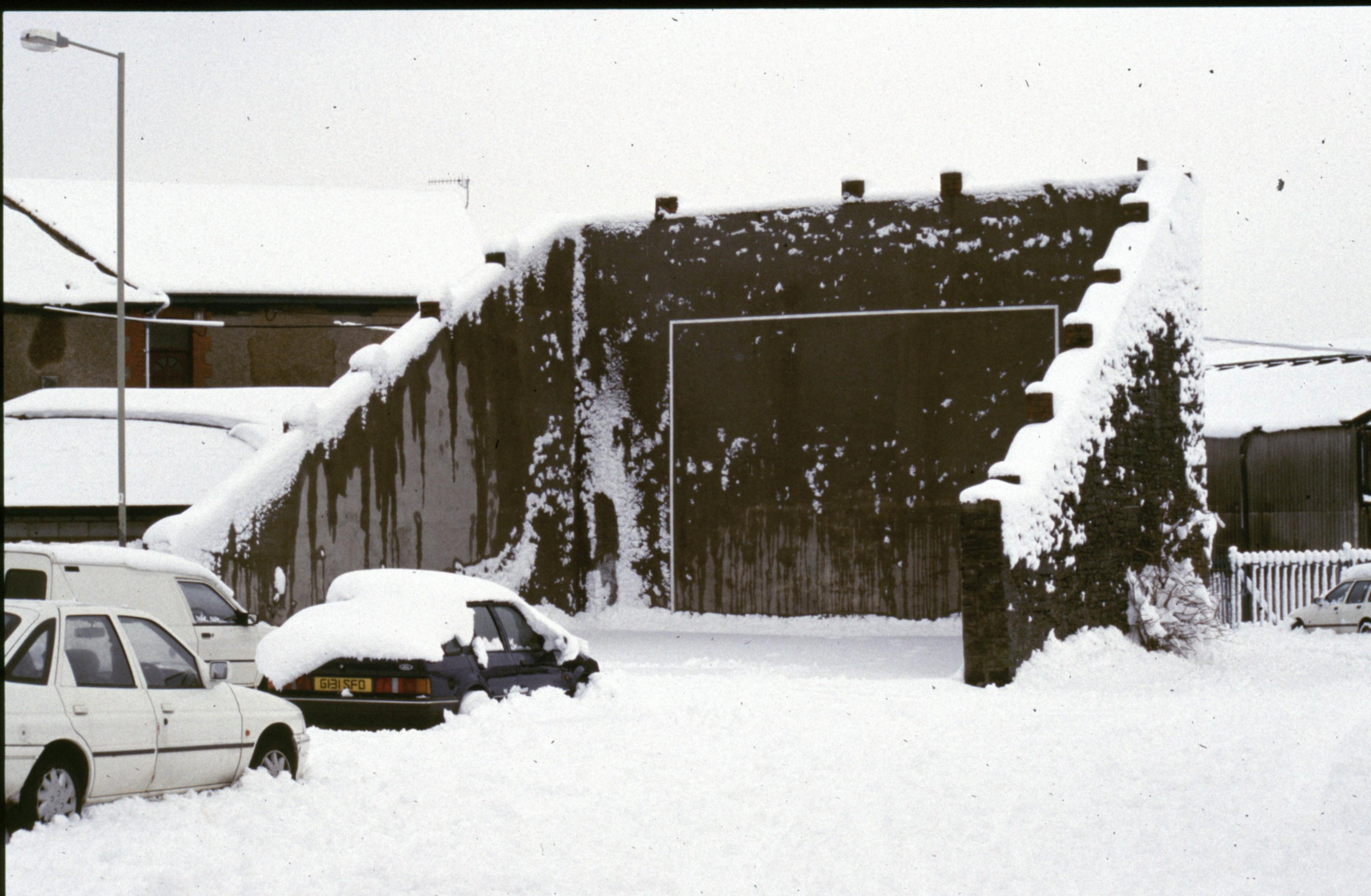
Nelson Handball court in the Winter of 1990. The court is situated in the village centre, and has been part of the village fabric for many decades.
