= Taff Merthyr Colliery Halt railway station =

Disused railway station in Trelewis, Merthyr Tydfil

Coordinates: 51.6654°N 3.2950°W

Taff Merthyr Colliery Halt

General information
- Location: Trelewis, Glamorgan; Wales
- Platforms: 2

Other information
- Status: Disused

History
- Original company: Great Western Railway
- Post-grouping: Great Western Railway

Key dates
- 1928: Opened
- 1964: Closed
Location

Taff Merthyr Colliery halt served the nearby Taff Merthyr Colliery near the village of Trelewis in the historic county of Glamorgan, Wales, from 1928 to 1964 on the Great Western Railway.

== History ==
The halt was open for use of the miners in September of 1928, two years after coal production began at the colliery in 1926. The halt was on the Taff Bargoed Joint Line between Nelson & llancaiach, to Dowlais, originally opened jointly by the Rhymney Railway and Great Western Railway. It closed on 15 June 1964. It was situated off the B4255 main road between Trelewis and Bedlinog, a plaque on the roadside at the old entrance to the colliery roughly marks the area.

Preceding station	Historical railways	Following station
Bedlinog; Line and station closed	Great Western Railway	Trelewis Platform; Line open, station closed
