= Josephine Griffin =

English film actress (1928–2005)

Josephine Griffin

Josephine Griffin (13 December 1928 – 15 September 2005) was a well-known English film actress who appeared in a string of British films in the 1950s, such as The Purple Plain (1954), The Man Who Never Was (1956) and The Spanish Gardener (1956). After retiring from acting, under her married name Josephine Filmer-Sankey, she wrote about the Bayeux Tapestry and edited the autobiography of Sir John Mandeville.

== Biography ==
Josephine Griffin was born in London on 13 December 1928, the only daughter of Ronald Griffin (son of Sir Lepel Griffin, a British colonial administrator in India).

In 1951–52 she acted in Peter Ustinov's play The Moment of Truth at the Adelphi Theatre in London, with Eric Portman and Cyril Luckham also in the cast.

She then appeared in a number of films in the 1950s. These included: The House of the Arrow (1953), The Weak and the Wicked (1954), The Purple Plain (1954, as Gregory Peck's wife), The Crowded Day (1954), an episode of the television series Fabian of the Yard (1955), Room in the House (1955), Portrait of Alison (1955; released in the USA as Postmark for Danger), The Extra Day (1956) and On Such a Night (short; 1956).

In 1955 she appeared in an episode of Strange Experiences.

She had perhaps her best roles in two other 1956 films; as Pam in The Man Who Never Was, and as Carol Burton in The Spanish Gardener.

She married in London on 11 October 1956. She made one more film, then retired from the screen.

== Husband's family ==
Her husband Patrick Hugh Filmer-Sankey was a film producer. He was the grandson of Hugh Grosvenor, 2nd Duke of Westminster, and Constance Cornwallis-West (Winston Churchill's step-aunt by marriage).

Josephine Griffin's other connection to Winston Churchill was that he was an unseen character in The Man Who Never Was; his voice was supplied by Peter Sellers.

== Literary career ==
Under her married name Josephine Filmer-Sankey, she co-wrote The Bayeux Tapestry: The Story of the Norman Conquest, 1066, with Norman Denny (published 1966). With Denny, she also edited a new version of The Travels of Sir John Mandeville (1973).

She died in London on 15 September 2005, aged 76, survived by her son William and two grandchildren, Frances and Benedict.

Her name has been attached to a pearl bracelet sold commercially.

== Filmography ==
Year	Title	Role	Notes
1953	The House of the Arrow	Ann Upcott	
1954	The Weak and the Wicked	Miriam	
1954	The Purple Plain	Mrs. Bill Forrester	
1954	The Crowded Day	Yvonne	
1955	Room in the House	Julia	
1955	Portrait of Alison	Jill Stewart	
1956	The Man Who Never Was	Pam	
1956	The Extra Day	Toni Howard	
1956	The Spanish Gardener	Carol Burton	
