= Trelewis Platform railway station =

Disused railway station in Trelewis, Merthyr Tydfil

Trelewis Platform

General information
- Location: Trelewis, Glamorgan; Wales
- Coordinates: 51.6695°N 3.2958°W
- Platforms: 2

Other information
- Status: Disused

History
- Original company: Rhymney Railway
- Pre-grouping: Rhymney Railway
- Post-grouping: Great Western Railway

Key dates
- 10 July 1911: Opened
- 15 June 1964: Closed
Location

Trelewis Platform railway station served the village of Trelewis in the historic county of Glamorgan, Wales, from 1911 to 1964 on the Taff Bargoed Joint Line of the Rhymney Railway and Great Western Railway.

== History ==
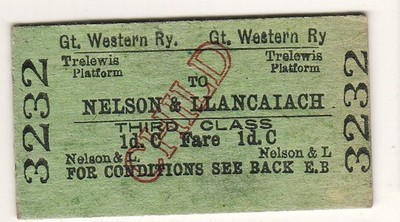
GWR child ticket, Trelewis Platform - Nelson & Llancaiach

The station was opened on 10 July 1911, jointly by the Great Western Railway and Rhymney Railway. The station was small, having a small waiting room and booking office on the up, and a small pagoda style shelter on the down. It was accessed from the top of Field Street and the road bridge from Cherry Tree Way. It closed to all traffic on 15 June 1964.

Preceding station	Historical railways	Following station
Taff Merthyr Colliery Halt; Line open, station closed	Rhymney Railway	Nelson and Llancaiach; Line open, station closed
