= Ruth (1948 film) =

- Directed by: Donald Taylor
- Written by: Percy N. Corry; Laurence Barrett
- Based on: Book of Ruth
- Produced by: Ward Richards
- Starring: Rita Birkett; Elspeth March; Peter Williams
- Cinematography: Frank Ellis
- Edited by: David Powell
- Music by: William Blezard
- Production companies: Religious Films, Ltd. G. H. W. Productions, Ltd.
- Release date: 1948
- Running time: 37 minutes
- Country: United Kingdom
- Language: English

Ruth is a British biblical short film produced by Ward Richards and directed by Donald Taylor. It was screened at the 1952 Olinda Film Festival.

== Synopsis ==
Moabite widow Ruth and her Judahite mother-in-law Naomi relocate to Naomi's home village, Bethlehem.

== Cast ==
- Rita Birkett as Ruth
- Elspeth March as Naomi
- Peter Williams as Boaz
- Jillian Palmer as Orpah
- Richard Carr as an overseer
- Arthur Lawrence as a kinsman
- Evelyn Moore as an old woman
- Raymond Jaquarello as a traveller

== Production ==
Ruth is the second of two 30-minute biblical shorts made for J. Arthur Rank. Rita Birkett, the actress cast in the role of Ruth, was discovered at the Warrington Repertory Company. Elspeth March had starred in two successful West End stage productions before she was cast in the film. March was given the role of Naomi "after several other actresses had been tested, none of whom measured up to the precise requirements of the producer." The film was shot at Gate Studios, Elstree.
