= Eynon Evans =

British actor and writer (1904–1989)

- Evans, playing Truscott in I'm All Right Jack (1959)
- Born: Evan Eynon Evans; 18 May 1904; Nelson, Glamorgan, Wales
- Died: 1989 (age 84); Merthyr Tydfil, Glamorganshire, Wales
- Occupation: Actor/Screenwriter
- Years active: 1939–1967

Evan Eynon Evans (18 May 1904 – 1989) billed as Eynon Evans and also known as E. Eynon Rees, was a Welsh writer and film actor of the 1950s, mainly known for his radio and television work. During the 1940s he appeared on the BBC radio variety show Welsh Rarebit as the comedic character Tommy Troubles, reaching an audience of 12 million.

== Career history ==
Evans was born in Nelson in Glamorgan, Wales. He became a bus driver, but switched jobs to become a full-time script writer. He came to note in the 1940s when he appeared on the wartime variety show Welsh Rarebit, which was broadcast throughout Great Britain and France. His character 'Tommy Troubles', along with his friends Willie, Llew and Jimmy became cult characters endearing themselves to the British public. At its peak the show reached 12 million people. When the radio show switched from radio to television in the early 1950s, Evans transferred with it to the screen, writing further adventures for Tommy Troubles.

In 1954 his play Wishing Well was adapted for a film treatment The Happiness of Three Women. Evans himself starred, in the Maurice Elvey directed film, as Amos the postman, while the more notable leads included Donald Houston and Petula Clark. In 1955, Evans' book Room in the House, was adapted for the screen by Alfred Shaughnessy, and again directed by Elvey, though on this occasion Evans did not feature. Evans continued working in film throughout the 1950s, including an uncredited appearance as a ticket collector in Private's Progress (1956), playing Decon in television children' drama The Buccaneers, one episode of Douglas Fairbanks, Jr., Presents (1956) and another uncredited role in The Battle of the River Plate (1956).

Along with his acting roles, Evans continued to produce feature-comedies for BBC Wales TV. Described as 'uncomplicated, if robust' by film historian David Berry, his works included The Prodigal Tenor (1957), The Bachelor Brother (1960) and Jubille Concert (1961).

In 1958 he appeared in the comedy westernThe Sheriff of Fractured Jaw, which was followed by a few one-off appearances in TV shows. In 1959 he took small roles in two notable British films, playing Mr Morgan in J. Lee Thompson's Tiger Bay and Truscott in John Boulting's I'm All Right Jack. After appearances in comedy films Friends and Neighbours (1959) and Two-Way Stretch (1960), he took a lead role in the 1960 television production of How Green Was My Valley. Evans played family patriarch Gwilym Morgan, with Welsh actress Rachel Thomas in the role of his wife.

Evans continued to take small TV roles through the early 1960s, and in 1962 he appeared in Only Two Can Play and Go to Blazes. Only Two Can Play was the third time he had appeared in a film starring Peter Sellers, the others being I'm All Right Jack and Two-Way Stretch. In 1964 he wrote and appeared in a BBC television series called Ring out an Alibi. Evans also played roles in several popular British television dramas in the late 1960s, including Danger Man, Dixon of Dock Green and Softly Softly.

== Filmography ==
- Undercover (1943) - Lieut. Banse
- The Happiness of Three Women (1954) - Amos Parry
- Private's Progress (1956) - Ticket Collector (uncredited)
- The Battle of the River Plate (1956) - Chief Engineer, Newton Beach, Prisoner on Graf Spee (uncredited)
- The Sheriff of Fractured Jaw (1958) - Mason (Manager - Jonathan Tibbs & Co.)
- Tiger Bay (1959) - Mr. Morgan
- I'm All Right Jack (1959) - Truscott
- Friends and Neighbours (1959) - Shopkeeper
- Two Way Stretch (1960) - Solicitor (uncredited)
- Only Two Can Play (1962) - Town Hall Clerk
- Go to Blazes (1962) - Mayor
