= Shadow Squad =

British TV drama series (1957–1959)

- Genre: Crime
- Starring: George Moon; Peter Williams; John Horsley
- Country of origin: United Kingdom
- Original language: English
- No. of series: 3
- No. of episodes: 179 (175 missing)

Production
- Running time: 30 minutes
- Production companies: Associated-Rediffusion (First series); Granada Television

Original release
- Network: ITV
- Release: 17 June 1957 – 24 June 1959

Shadow Squad is a British TV drama series that ran from 1957–1959 starring Peter Williams and George Moon. Three series were made, the first produced by Associated-Rediffusion and the second and third series produced by Granada Television. 179 episodes were made, of which only four survive, all four of which are from the second series. Network released the surviving four episodes on DVD in 2011, with the surviving episodes titled "Race Against Time: Parts 1 and 2", and "The Missing Cheese: Parts 1 and 2". Also released on the DVD was the sole surviving episode of the spin-off, Skyport, titled "The Spanish Girl". All five of these episodes were produced by Granada Television.

== Premise ==
Criminal cases investigated by the Shadow Squad detective agency run by former Scotland Yard sleuth Don Carter, along with his trusty Cockney sidekick Ginger Smart.

== Main cast ==
- George Moon as Ginger Smart
- Peter Williams as Don Carter
- John Horsley as Supt. Whitelaw
- Rex Garner as Vic Steele
- Kathleen Boutall as Mrs. Moggs
