= Wishing Well (play) =

1946 play

- Original language: English
- Written by: Eynon Evans
- Genre: Comedy
- Setting: Wishing Well Inn, present day

Premiere
- Date: 13 May 1946
- Place: Grand Theatre, Wolverhampton

Wishing Well is a comedy play by the British writer Eynon Evans. It was first staged at the Grand Theatre, Wolverhampton in 1946. It ran for 44 performances at the Comedy Theatre between 4 September and 11 October 1952. The West End cast included Evans, Lupino Lane, Glyn Houston, Douglas Argent and Patsy Smart. The owner of the Wishing Well inn tries to solve various people's problems.

== Film adaptation ==
In 1954, it was adapted into the film The Happiness of Three Women directed by Maurice Elvey and starring Donald Houston, Petula Clark and Patricia Cutts as well as Eynon Evans.

== Bibliography ==
- Goble, Alan. The Complete Index to Literary Sources in Film. Walter de Gruyter, 1999.
- Wearing, J.P. The London Stage 1950-1959: A Calendar of Productions, Performers, and Personnel. Rowman & Littlefield, 2014.
