= On Such a Night (1955 film) =

- Directed by: Anthony Asquith
- Screenplay by: Paul Dehn
- Produced by: Francis Edge
- Starring: David Knight; Marie Lohr; Josephine Griffin
- Cinematography: Frank North
- Edited by: Anthony Harvey
- Production company: Screen Audiences Ltd.
- Release date: 1955
- Running time: 37 minutes
- Country: United Kingdom
- Languages: English; Italian

On Such a Night is a 1955 British short semi-documentary film directed by Anthony Asquith and starring David Night, Marie Lohr and Josephine Griffin. It was written by Paul Dehn.

The film offers a snapshot of the Glyndebourne opera house in the 1950s, including extracts from Le nozze di Figaro, and a fictional first visit to the opera house by an American. According to British musicologist Rodney Milnes the film was "very discreetly aimed at potential American audiences fascinated by British eccentricities".

== Synopsis ==
An American tourist has been persuaded by to visit Alfriston but is bemused by what he witnesses at Victoria Station when people in evening dress join his train. After a confusing journey in a compartment with two men talking about a new countess, he alights at Lewes and is more baffled still when the formally dressed people get on a Southdown bus waiting there. He gets in a taxi and asks the driver to follow the bus. Arriving at the entrance of Glyndebourne, he explains to an upper-class lady he had noticed at Victoria Station, who is with her niece, that he does not have a ticket, at which they ask John Christie who sees that he gets one.

During the performance he watches Sesto Bruscantini sing "Non più andrai" and Sena Jurinac (the "new Countess") sing "Porgi, amor". The end of the second-act finale is shown, with Franco Calabrese, Monica Sinclair, Hugues Cuénod and Ian Wallace, and the very end of the opera. There is also a scene of Carl Ebert rehearsing Jurinac and Rizzieri and of the conductor Vittorio Gui and the administrator Moran Caplat, and the orchestra playing croquet. The film ends with the lady giving the American her ticket for Don Giovanni the following week so that he can come with her niece.

== Cast ==
- David Knight as David Cornell
- Marie Lohr as Lady Falconbridge
- Josephine Griffin as Virginia Ridley
- Allan Cuthbertson as 1st gentleman
- Peter Jones as 2nd gentleman

In the opera extracts:

- Sesto Bruscantini as Figaro
- Elena Rizzieri as Susanna
- Ian Wallace as Dr Bartolo
- Monica Sinclair as Marcellina
- Frances Bible as Cherubino
- Franco Calabrese as Count Almaviva
- Hugues Cuénod as Don Basilio
- Sena Jurinac as Countess Almaviva
- Gwyn Griffiths as Antonio
- Jeannette Sinclair as Barbarina
- Daniel McCoshan as Don Curzio

The Royal Philharmonic Orchestra is conducted by Vittorio Gui.

== Production ==
It was filmed at Pinewood Studios and Lewes railway station on 28 May to 12 June 1955, with the operatic excerpts on 6 June 1955.

The film is shot in Technicolor and Vista Vision.

== Release ==
After a private viewing on 25 October 1955, the first public showing was on 24 November at the Gaumont Haymarket cinema, London, on a bill with Simon and Laura (1955).

== Reception ==
The Monthly Film Bulletin wrote: "This is the simple (and rather thin) story framework adopted by Paul Dehn and Anthony Asquith for their affectionate little impression of Glyndebourne. The handling is smooth and pleasant, the opera extracts excellent, the off-stage glimpses quite intriguing, and a scene of Carl Ebert rehearsing two singers is beautifully filmed. David Knight plays the hick American with charm, and On Such a Night as a whole has a quiet, whimsical appeal."

The Daily Film Renter wrote: "Pleasantness is the word for this one – pleasant scenery, pleasant people, and pleasant music. Its impact, while by no means weighty, satisfies and leaves a happy all's-right-with-the-world after-taste. Anthony Asquith directs it effortlessly and genially and with only a few notes of condescension despite its basic motif, namely how a visiting American (David Knight) discovers for himself the true meaning of the British way of life through a visit to Glyndebourne and chance friendship with a dowager and her niece."

In Sight and Sound James Morgan commented that the “affectionate though whimsical tour of Glyndebourne”, “is handled with lightness and tact, and Asquith's facility with this kind of thing carries it smoothly through”. He also remarked on the “charming glimpse of members of the orchestra playing croquet in the interval, with the sound of their musical instruments synchronised to each swipe of the mallet” and the “beautifully sung” excerpts from rehearsal and performance of the opera.

== Home media ==
The film was released on DVD in 2010, using a print from the BFI National Archive.
