= The Happiness of Three Women =

1954 British film by Maurice Elvey

- Directed by: Maurice Elvey
- Written by: Marfy Davies; Eynon Evans
- Based on: Wishing Well by Eynon Evans
- Produced by: David Dent
- Starring: Brenda de Banzie; Donald Houston; Petula Clark; Patricia Cutts
- Cinematography: Stanley Pavey
- Edited by: Robert Jordan Hill
- Music by: Edwin Astley
- Production company: David Dent Productions
- Distributed by: Adelphi Films
- Release date: 9 December 1954
- Running time: 78 minutes
- Country: United Kingdom
- Language: English

The Happiness of Three Women is a 1954 British second feature ('B') drama film directed by Maurice Elvey and starring Brenda de Banzie, Donald Houston and Petula Clark. It was adapted from Eynon Evans's Welsh-set 1946 play Wishing Well. The film was released on the Odeon Circuit as a double bill with The Crowded Day (1954).

== Plot ==
Amos Parry is a postman who good-heartedly meddles in other peoples' lives, hoping to help them find happiness. He gets entangled with three women who arrive at the Wishing Well Inn, run by his girlfriend Jane Price – a widow, an unhappily married lady, and a rich but idle woman.

== Cast ==
- Brenda de Banzie as Jane Price
- Eynon Evans as Amos Parry
- Petula Clark as Delith
- Donald Houston as John
- Patricia Burke as Ann Murray
- Patricia Cutts as Irene Jennings
- Bill O'Connor as Peter Jennings
- Gladys Hay as Amelia Smith
- Glyn Houston as Morgan
- Emrys Leyshon as David Miles
- Hugh Pryse as the minister
- Jessie Evans as Blodwen
- John Lewis as bus driver
- Mary Jones as Mary Lewis
- Julie Milton as Nancy
- Eira Griffiths as Hannah
- Ronnie Harries

== Production ==
It was made at Walton Studios with sets designed by the art director John Stoll.

== Reception ==
The Monthly Film Bulletin wrote: "The sole virtues of this film lie in a few amusing (though never witty) lines of dialogue, and Brenda de Banzies' brave attempts with a part in which she is wholly wasted. The plot (which concerns, in fact, the happiness of four women) is artificial, the dialogue is banal, while the more farcical clements of the story combine badly with the gummy sentiment and the moments of high-flown melodrama."

Kine Weekly wrote: "Unpretentious romantic comedy drama ... The picture is, it will be observed, entitled The Happiness of Three Women, but we counted five. The error in arithmetic does not, however, rob the play of pleasing sentiment and simple humour. Eynon Evans, a newcomer, very nearly outstays his welcome as Amos, but Brenda De Banzie is more restrained as Jane, and Petula Clark, Donald Houston, Patricia Cutts, Bill O'Connor, Gladys Hay and Patricia Burke are versatile in direct support. The settings are agreeable, a Welsh choir proves an attractive embellishment."

Variety wrote: "There is a pleasant Welsh atmosphere about this modest British production with a strong local cast ... The yarn has a leisurely Welsh charm, mainly derived from the homely philosophy of the village postman who believes that he can solve other people's problems. There is also the romantic side issue of the innkeeper's paralyzed son who feels that his impending marriage to a local girl is a major mistake. Brenda de Banzie, Petula Clark, Donald Houston and Patricia Cutts head the cast in competent fashion while the author makes a promising screen debut in the role of the postman. Maurice Elvey has done a straightforward job of direction. Other credits are up to standard."

In British Sound Films: The Studio Years 1928–1959 David Quinlan rated the film as "average", writing: "Rather overcrowded amalgam of sentiment and fun."

Leslie Halliwell said: "Minor Welsh waffle which pleased naïve audiences at the time."
