= Llancaiach Colliery =

Welsh coal mine active 1811-1887

Coordinates: 51.6590°N 3.2834°W

Llancaiach Colliery was a coal mine in the South Wales Valleys, located just to the north of the village of Nelson and just to the south of Llancaiach Fawr Manor.

It was opened by Thomas Powell in 1811, and from 1841 was served by the bespoke Llancaiach Branch line of the Taff Vale Railway.

The mine closed in 1887.
