= Llancaiach Fawr =

Tudor manor house in Nelson, Caerphilly

Coordinates: 51.6613°N 3.2829°W

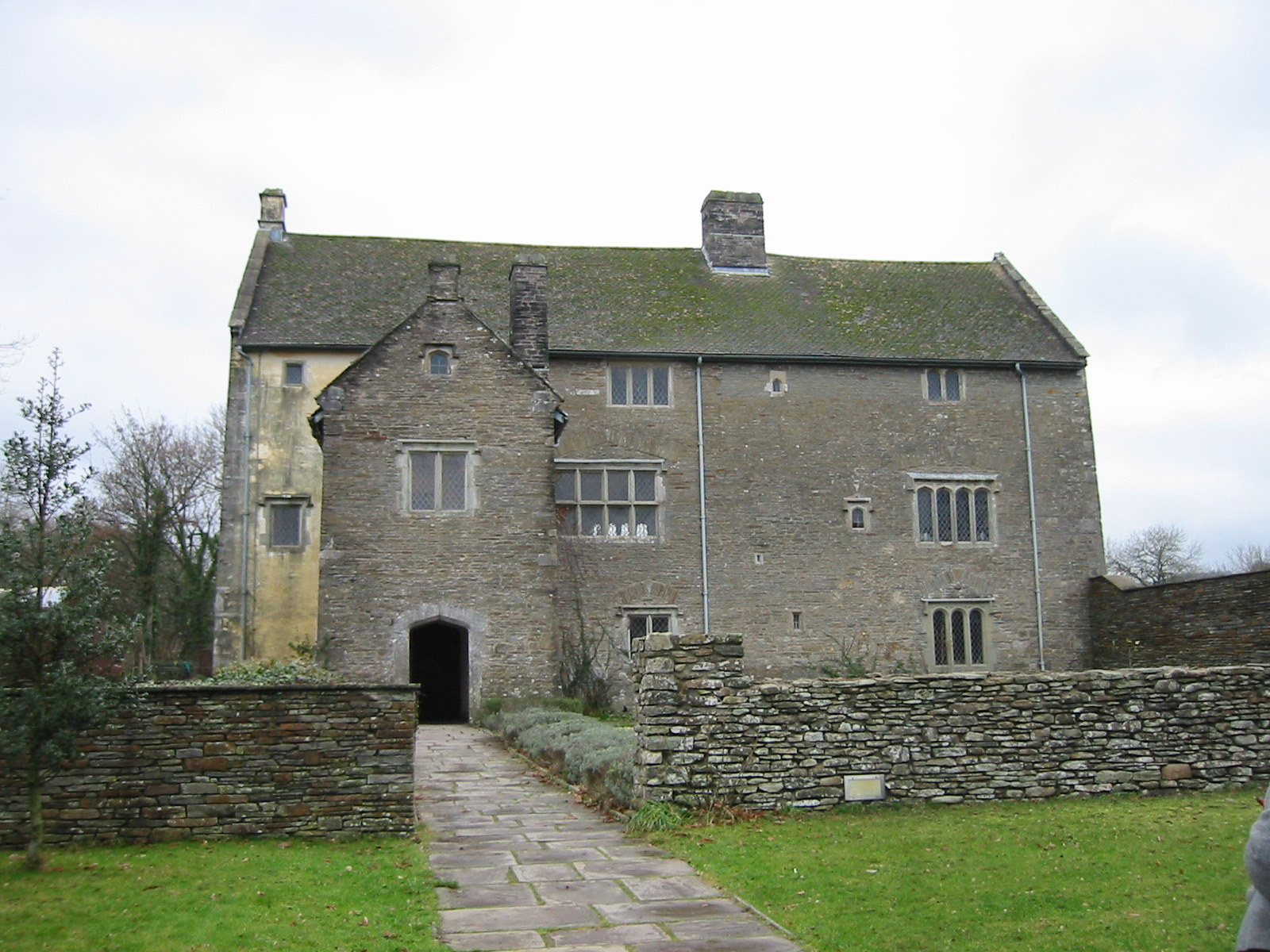
Llancaiach Fawr

Llancaiach Fawr Manor is a Tudor manor house near the village of Nelson, located just to the north of the site of the former Llancaiach Colliery in the heart of the Rhymney Valley in South Wales. The semi-fortified house was built on the site of an earlier medieval structure, either on top of the previous dwelling or possibly incorporated within the eastern end of that building. It is a Grade I listed building and is now best known as the home of Colonel Edward Prichard (died 1655), who hosted a visit by King Charles I of England in 1645.

Llancaiach Fawr Manor was at one time thought to have predated the Acts of Union between Wales and England of 1536 and was talked about in John Leland’s Itinerary of 1537. The manor house is thought to have been built in about 1530 for one Dafydd ap Richard. (Prichard being a modernised form of the patronymic "ap Rhisiart"). However, dendrochronology results (from a Time Team excavation) indicate a felling date for the roof timbers of 1548–1565, later than was originally thought.

The Manor is considered to be one of the most important gentry houses to have survived from the 16th and 17th century period. The house operated as a living history museum, but was permanently closed by Caerphilly County Borough Council in December 2024 as a result of budgetary restraints.

== The Prichard family ==
When Civil War broke out between King and Parliament in 1642, Colonel Edward Prichard of Llancaiach Fawr was appointed Commissioner of Array to the King, raising men and money for the Royalist cause in Glamorganshire. His wife, Mary, was the sister of Bussy Mansell, a zealous Parliamentarian.

By the middle of 1645 support was waning and King Charles toured South Wales in an effort to rally support. He visited Llancaiach Fawr on 5 August of that year. (A silver coin with Charles's image, dated 1645, is among artefacts found by archaeologists in the grounds of the house.) Shortly afterwards, the Prichards and many other Glamorgan gentry changed sides to support Parliament. Later in the year, Colonel Prichard was appointed Governor of Cardiff Castle. In February 1646 he staunchly held the Castle for the Parliamentarians against a siege headed by Edward Carne. He was also commended "for his constancy in that affray" after the battle of St Fagans (1648), by Colonel Horton, the Parliamentary victor.

== Construction and renovation ==
The manor house was designed to be easily defended during a turbulent period in Welsh and British history and is considered one of the finest surviving examples of a semi-fortified manor in Wales. Its first owner, Dafydd ap Richard, is known to have been lord of the manor in 1549. The original defensive design incorporated a single entrance, four-foot thick walls enclosing spiral stone staircases for access between floors and stout wooden doors with iron bolts; there may originally have been up to fourteen staircases, one for each room. When the doors were securely closed, the Manor was effectively divided in two, ensuring that the inner east wing provided a self-contained place of refuge in case of attack.

By the beginning of the Stuart dynasty the Prichard family had prospered and the house was extended in 1628 by David Prichard (the father of Colonel Edward Prichard) to demonstrate their status. The Grand Staircase now allowed easy access between floors and two of the rooms used by the family were panelled in oak. Other changes to the interior included a "4-centred arch" above the staircase. Mullioned windows were also added, with leaded glazing being a 20th-century addition. A roof of Cotswold tile, also dating from the 20th century, was replaced in the course of the 2014 refurbishment with a slate roof.

== Servants ==
Servants outnumbered the family they worked for and many of them lived in the manor. At the time of Colonel Prichard’s ownership, it was likely that 15 servants lived in, with another 15 employed as outworkers. Higher status positions, such as the housekeeper, agent and valet, would often be passed down from generation to generation within the same family. The lesser roles, such as the outworkers, would be filled from those who offered their skills and labour at the hiring fair (held on Lady Day each year). These workers would be hired and paid on a quarterly basis. The most important servant would have been the Steward. He would’ve been educated and fluent in Welsh and English with a strong knowledge of the law and good insight into the local tenantry. Many of the servants were young and unmarried and all would have had several skills for different types of work.

== The house after 1645 ==
When the house passed out of the hands of the Prichard family, it was used as a farmhouse; the Tithe Map of 1842 and the OS map of 1875 show that there was an orchard at the rear. The house was purchased by the former Rhymney Valley District Council in 1979, and was restored during the 1980s with a view to being opened to the public as a local history museum. After modern conveniences had been added, it was decided to convert it into a living history museum, and it opened as such in the early 1990s.

Since the house opened to the public, first-person conversation has been used by the costumed interpreters in the house, who take on the role of the house servants. Consequently, they communicate with visitors entirely in period English (claiming that the Master of the House disapproves of the use of Welsh, a not uncommon attitude at the time), and feign unfamiliarity with post-1645 history and technological developments.

Visitors today see the house furnished as it would have been in 1645. All the furnishings in the rooms are accurate reproductions of items from the time of the Prichards and many of the originals can be found in the St Fagans National History Museum, such as a cast-iron firescreen dating from the mid 17th century. The thematic setting for the museum is the year 1645, at the height of the English Civil War when King Charles I visited the house to persuade its owner, Colonel Edward Prichard, not to change his allegiance. Prichard did change his allegiance soon after, and this allows the house to represent the different sides of the conflict at different times in the year.

In 2013, it was announced that Caerphilly County Borough Council had been successful in obtaining £943,200 in funding from the Heritage Lottery Fund to replace the roof, install a platform lift for better accessibility, and restore the attic, previously closed to the public, as servants' quarters; the addition of the slate roof was delayed by the presence of bats (a protected species) in the attics. The project started in late 2013, and was completed in 2015. In 2015, First minister Carwyn Jones unveiled the results of the project that has restored the servants quarters to the way they were in 1645. The aim is to attract 80,000 visitors a year by 2020.

Watercolour artist Thomas Frederick Worrall lived in nearby Nelson during the early twentieth century, and painted a depiction of the rear of the building from the kitchen garden in 1911 or 1912. The painting is displayed in the reception area of the manor. The Manor closed to the public on 22 December 2024.

== Media and events ==
The building has been used in many TV and film productions, including Doctor Who; and the S4C children's series Dan Glo. In an episode of Time Team, archaeologists dug in the grounds in search of the house's predecessor. No evidence of a previous dwelling was found, but several old coins and some Bronze Age pottery were found. The Urdd Eisteddfod was held on the site in 2015.

== Reputed paranormal activity ==
The house is considered by paranormal enthusiasts to be a haunted site. Liam Garrahan, a journalist with Wales Online visited the house in 2018 and detailed four spirits said to haunt the manor, but observed nothing.
