= List of schools in Caerphilly County Borough =

This is a list of schools in Caerphilly County Borough in Wales.

== Primary schools ==
- Aberbargoed Primary School
- Abertysswg Primary School
- Abercarn Primary School
- Bedwas Primary School
- Blackwood Primary School
- Bryn Awel Primary School
- Bryn Primary School
- Cefn Fforest Primary School
- Coed Y Brain Primary School
- Crumlin High Level Primary School
- Cwmaber Primary School
- Cwmcarn Primary School
- Cwmfelinfach Primary School
- Cwm Glas Primary School
- Cwm Ifor Primary School
- Cwrt Rawlin Primary School
- Deri Primary School
- Derwendeg Primary School
- Fleur de Lys Primary School
- Fochriw Primary School
- Gilfach Fargoed Primary School
- Glyn Gaer Primary School
- Graig-y-Rhacca Primary School
- Greenhill Primary School
- Hendredenny Park Primary School
- Hendre Primary School
- Hengoed Primary School
- Idris Davies School 3-18
- Libanus Primary School
- Llancaeach Primary School
- Llanfabon Primary School
- Machen Primary School
- Maesycwmmer Primary School
- Markham Primary School
- Nant Y Parc Primary School
- Pantside Primary School
- Park Primary School
- Pengam Primary School
- Penllwyn Primary School
- Pentwynmawr Primary School
- Phillipstown Primary School
- Plasyfelin Primary School
- Pontllanfraith Primary School
- Rhiw Syr Dafydd Primary School
- Rhydri Primary School
- Risca Primary School
- St Gwladys Bargoed School
- St Helens RC Primary School
- St James' Primary School
- The Twyn School
- Tir-y-Berth Primary School
- Trinant Primary School
- Tynewydd Primary School
- Tyn-y-Wern Primary School
- Ty Sign Primary School
- Upper Rhymney Primary School
- Waunfawr Primary School
- White Rose Primary School
- Ynysddu Primary School
- Ystrad Mynach Primary School

== Welsh medium primary schools ==
- Ysgol Gymraeg Bro Allta
- Ysgol Gymraeg Cwm Derwen
- Ysgol Gymraeg Cwm Gwyddon
- Ysgol Gymraeg Trelyn
- Ysgol Gymraeg Gilfach Fargod
- Ysgol Gynradd Gymraeg Caerffili
- Ysgol Gynradd Gymraeg Y Castell
- Ysgol Bro Sannan
- Ysgol Ifor Bach
- Ysgol Penalltau
- Ysgol Y Lawnt

== Secondary schools ==
- Bedwas High School
- Blackwood Comprehensive School
- Heolddu Comprehensive School
- Idris Davies School 3-18
- Islwyn High School
- Lewis Girls' Comprehensive School
- Lewis School, Pengam
- Newbridge Comprehensive School
- Risca Community Comprehensive School
- St Cenydd Comprehensive School
- St Martin's Comprehensive School

- - -

- Oakdale Comprehensive School and Pontllanfraith Comprehensive School have both amalgamated to form Islwyn High School
- Rhymney Comprehensive School - has now amalgamated with Abertysswg Primary School, and the new name is Idris Davies School 3-18

== Welsh medium secondary schools ==
- Ysgol Gyfun Cwm Rhymni

== Special school & Alternative Provision ==
- Trinity Fields Special School

- -

- Cefn Fforrest Primary School - Speech and Language Class included.
- Coed Y Bryn Primary School - Special Resource Base attached.
- Cwm Ifor Primary School - Satellite Class attached.
- Cwmcarn Primary School - Special Resource Base attached.
- Deri Primary School - Satellite Class attached.
- Greenhill Primary School - Special Resource Base.
- Pantside Primary School - ASD Base Attached.
- Pontllanfraith Primary - ASD Base attached.
- St. James Primary School - Special Resource Base attached.
- Tir-y-Beryth Primary School - Speech and Language Class included.
- Ty-Sign Primary School - Special Resource Base attached.
- Ty-y-Wern Primary School - Special Resource Base attached.
- Ynysddu Primary School - Nuture Class Reception and Yr 1. Social Inclusion Class Yrs 3 and 4.
- Ysgol Gymraeg Cwm Derwen - Special Resource Base attached. (Welsh language.)

- -

- Islwyn High School - Special Resource Base attached.
- Risca Community Comprehensive School - Special Resource Base attached.
- St. Cenydd School - hearing impaired base and Special Resource Base attached.

- -

- The Learning Centre, Glan-Y-Nant PRU, Caerphilly

== Independent Schools ==
- ACT Schools Caerphilly age range 11-16
- Mynydd Haf Independent School
- Wycliff Independent Christian School
