= Sam Cookson =

Sam Cookson may refer to:

- Sam Cookson (English footballer) (1896–?), English footballer for Manchester City
- Sam Cookson (Welsh footballer) (1891–?), Welsh footballer for Manchester United
