= Lewis School, Pengam =

Coordinates: 51.6725°N 3.2245°W

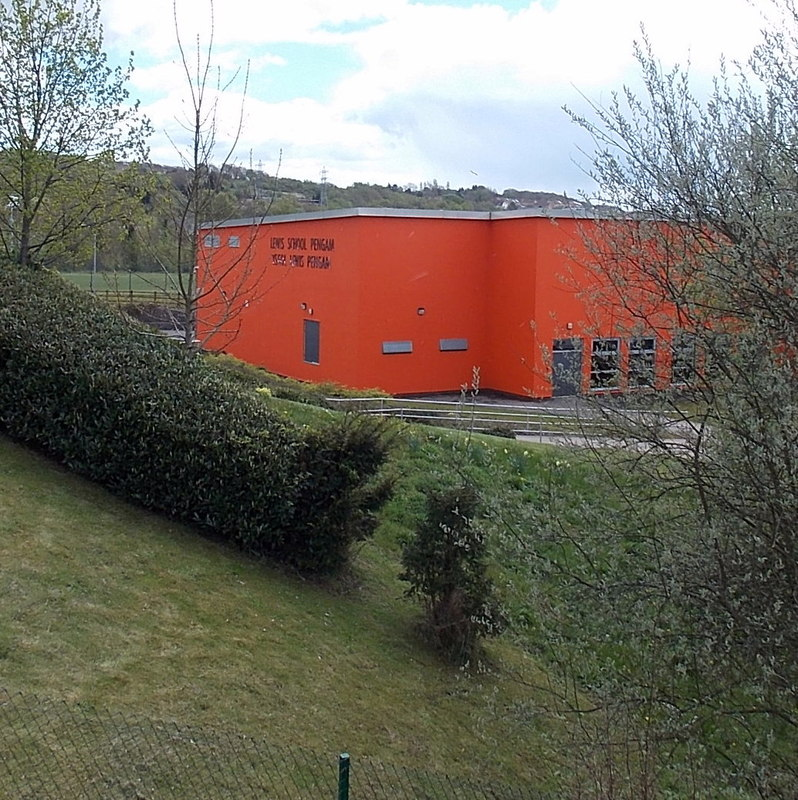
- Gilfach, Glamorgan; Wales

Information
- Type: State
- Motto: Ni Ddychwel Doe (Welsh language: "Yesterday Never Returns")
- Established: Trusteeship established 1729, school probably not inaugurated and functioning until circa 1760
- Headmaster: Chris Parry
- Enrollment: 1100 (approx.)
- Website: lsp.wales

Lewis Boys School, Pengam is a comprehensive school, founded in 1729 in the parish and village of Gelligaer and, later, moved to the nearby village of Gilfach, in the Rhymney Valley in South Wales. It was founded and funded by a legacy of Sir Edward Lewis of Gilfach Fargoed in the Parish of Gelligaer, a knight, landowner and captain of industry who died in 1728. It became comprehensive during the 1970s.

== Location ==
The building currently occupied by the school was opened in 2002, in Gilfach at the northern perimeter of one of its former Pengam sites. Before 2002, the campus was in Pengam, across two sites, with a bridge spanning the main road between them. This bridge is still used to connect the new site to a collection of sports facilities located across the road. A third site, at the former Graddfa Secondary Modern School in Ystrad Mynach, provided for around 300 younger secondary pupils between 1973 and 2002. This third site was purchased in 2003 by Ystrad Mynach College, whose Ystrad Mynach campus lies adjacent to the Graddfa site. Until circa 1848, the school was wholly located in Gelligaer.

== History ==
Lewis Boys School was established as a school for poor boys of the parish of Gelligaer, as can be seen from this extract of Sir Edward Lewis' will,

"That they in the first place out of the profits of the Wood and premises Build a School near the Church of the value of forty pounds And also every year after the Building of the said School that my said Trustees pay to a School Master yearly out of the rents and profits of the said premises the sume of ten pounds per annum and likewise that my said Trustees lay out fifteen pounds yearly for Coats and Caps for fifteen poor Boys of the said parish to be taught by the said Master to Read write and cast Accompt, And the rest of the profits for the improving that Charity for the use of the said Master and Boys",

Lewis' School was originally a school for boys founded in a time when girls rarely received an education so no distinction of gender was needed in its title which was simply Lewis' School. So from modest beginnings the school was moved and enlarged, 1848, later to become a grammar school, though always maintaining the simple title, Lewis' School, eventually extending its catchment to other parishes, Bedwellty, Mynyddislwyn and St Ilans and more and more in the late 19th century to girls of those parishes.

The school was associated with Lewis Girls Comprehensive School originally opened in Hengoed near Pengam in November 1900 but later moved to a new, larger facility in the town of Ystrad Mynach.

Both schools became comprehensive schools under subsequent educational reform. Lewis School Pengam remained an all-male school until the end of year 11, as Lewis Girls' School remained an all-female school until the end of year 11. However, both schools shared a mixed-gender 6th Form Consortium for years 12 and 13. Two other nearby schools, Heolddu Comprehensive School and Rhymney Comprehensive School, are also included in this consortium. In 2026, the schools merged as Lewis' Girls School was closed. The Ystrad Mynach site is subsequently being used as a lower school until expansion is completed on the Pengam site.

Both institutions during their times as grammar schools were renowned for consistently excellent standards of education and the high attainments of many of their pupils.

In 1986 the school was criticised by STOPP for its use of corporal punishment (caning), after an inspectors' report stated that 60 out of 360 boys in the lower school had been caned in the course of one year.

== Trivia ==
- Once described by David Lloyd George as "the Eton College of the Valleys".

== Notable former staff ==
- Alfred Evans (politician), headmaster, 1966–1968
- Alun Lewis (poet), teacher
- David Wynne (composer), teacher

== Notable old Ludovicans ==
- Paul Atherton, television and film producer
- Ray Bishop, footballer (Brighton, Cardiff and Newport County)
- Mervyn Burtch, composer
- Douglas Davies, theologian
- John Dawes, international rugby union player
- Bradley Dredge, professional golfer, European Tour winner
- Geoff Eales, jazz musician
- Iorwerth Evans, rugby player
- Jonathan Evans, politician
- Jonathan Evans, rugby player
- George Fisher, dramatist, director
- Julian Hodge, financier
- Peter Hubbard-Miles, politician
- Berwyn Jones, athlete, rugby player
- Humphrey Owen Jones, chemist and mountaineer
- Morgan Jones, politician and conscientious objector
- Thomas Jones, civil servant, academic and founder of Coleg Harlech
- Geoffrey Thomas, pastor
- Neil Kinnock, politician
- Victor Erle Nash-Williams, Welsh archaeologist
- John O'Shea, international rugby union player
- Berwyn Price, athlete
- Craig Roberts, Welsh actor
- David Rocyn-Jones, medic, former president of the Welsh Rugby Union
- Richard Vaughan, badminton player, 2000 and 2004 Olympian
- Simon Weston, Falklands War veteran, charity worker
- Phil Williams, politician, scientist
- Zephaniah Williams, chartist campaigner; one of the leaders of the Newport revolt
- Craig Haydn Roberts, is a Welsh actor and director.
