= Bargoed =

Bargoed: Welsh: Bargod
- Town
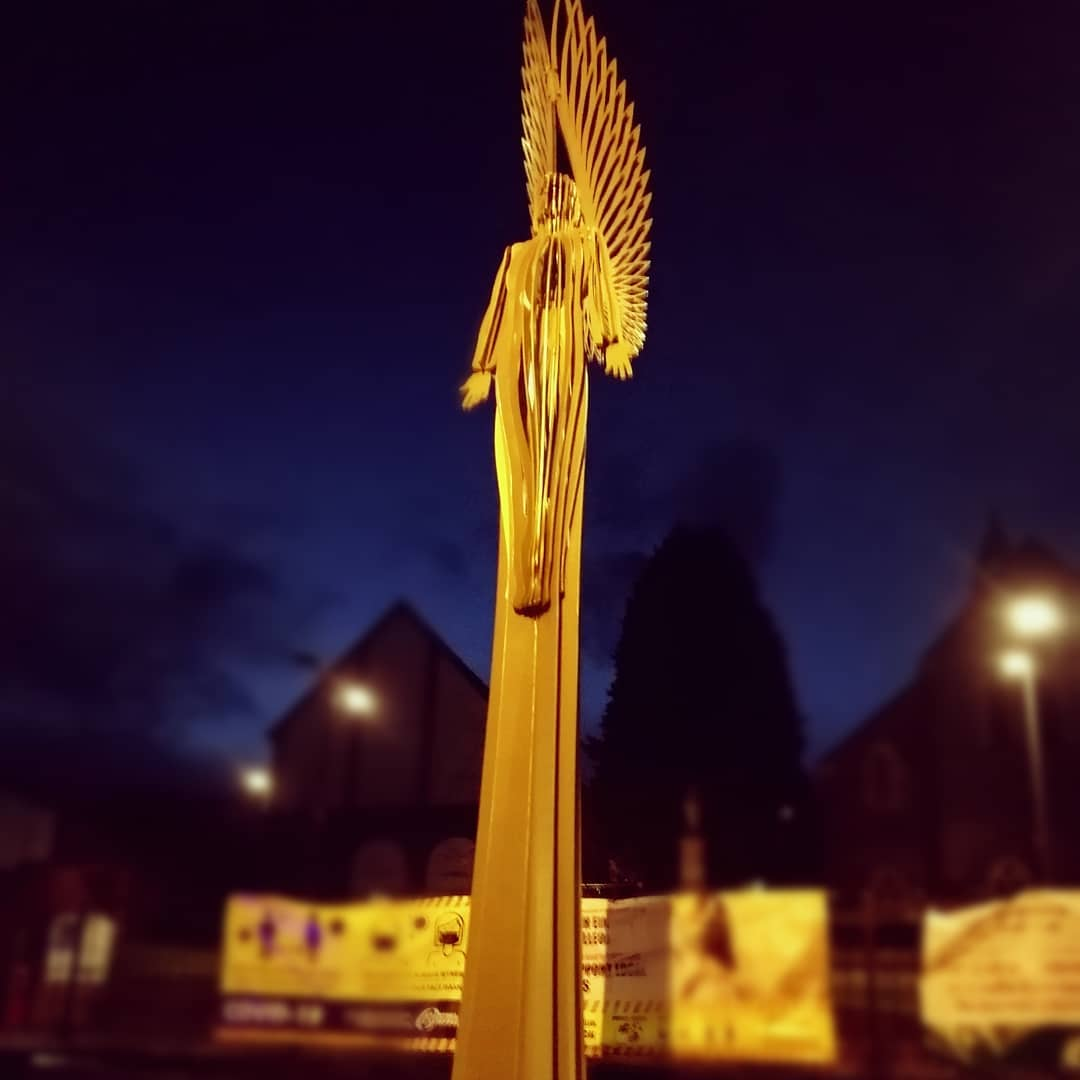
- The Angel Statue in the town centre

- Location within Caerphilly
- Population: 11,900 (2011)
- OS grid reference: ST145995
- Principal area: Caerphilly
- Preserved county: Gwent
- Country: Wales
- Sovereign state: United Kingdom
- Post town: BARGOED
- Postcode district: CF81
- Dialling code: 01443
- Police: Gwent
- Fire: South Wales
- Ambulance: Welsh
- UK Parliament: Blaenau Gwent and Rhymney
- Website: bargoedtc.org.uk
- List of places UK Wales Caerphilly 51.69°N 3.24°W Map of the community

Bargoed (Welsh: Bargod) is a town and community in the Rhymney Valley, Wales, one of the South Wales Valleys. It lies on the Rhymney River in the county borough of Caerphilly. It straddles the ancient boundary of Glamorgan and Monmouthshire, with Bargoed lying in Glamorgan and Aberbargoed in Monmouthshire. 'Greater Bargoed', as defined by the local authority Caerphilly County Borough Council, consists of the towns of Bargoed and Aberbargoed and the village of Gilfach. The combined population of these settlements is about 13,000. The town's rugby club Bargoed RFC holds the world record for the most consecutive league wins in a row and was World Rugby magazine's team of the year in 2005.

== Toponymy ==
The name of the town is derived from that of the River Bargoed, which itself is based on the Welsh word bargod "border, boundary". The change from Bargod to Bargoed is recorded from the sixteenth century onwards and was probably a hypercorrection under the influence of coed "trees, woods", perhaps reinforced by nearby place names such as Pen-y-coed, Argoed and Blackwood (Welsh: y Coed-duon). The modern pronunciation of the town's name varies depending on street, ranging from /ˈbɑːrɡɒd/ BAR-god (based on Bargod Welsh pronunciation: [ˈbarɡɔd]) and /ˈbɑːrɡɔɪd/ BAR-goyd (based on Bargoed) to the more informal /ˈbɑːrɡəd/ BAR-gəd.

== History ==
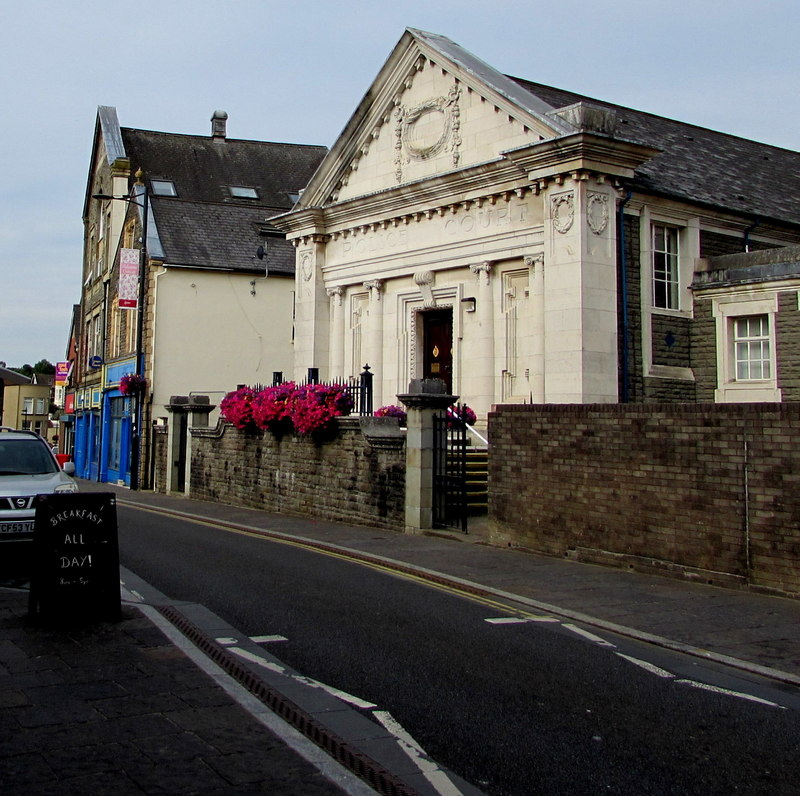
Bargoed Town Hall

Originally a market town, Bargoed grew into a substantial town following the opening of a colliery in 1903. Bargoed Town Hall was originally a courthouse, completed in 1911. By 1921 Bargoed had a population of 17,901; this has been steadily declining since that time, as the general demand for Welsh coal continued to fall. The colliery, which was the subject of a painting by L. S. Lowry, closed during the 1970s, and its former site is now a country park.

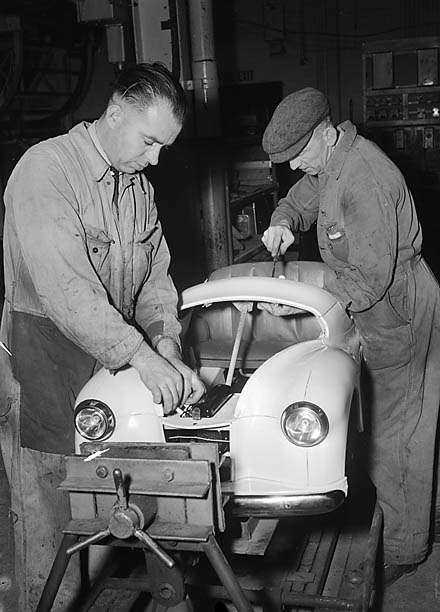
Austin Motor Company pedal cars being made at Bargoed.

The town was home to a factory built by the Austin Motor Company from 1949. This was a project by Austin chairman Leonard Lord, with government funding, to employ miners suffering from pneumoconiosis, a lung disease caused by prolonged inhalation of dust. In 1945 it was estimated that 5000 miners in the South Wales region were affected by the condition to the extent that they could not work in the coal industry. The Austin factory at Bargoed became the first factory in the world where every employee was registered as disabled. Ex-miners could work at Bargoed under full-time medical supervision and with medical facilities on-site at the factory. The factory work was understandably light, with the main product being the Austin J40 children's pedal car. The success and efficiency of the factory was such that 150 men were employed by 1953 and Austin began the manufacture of small metal pressings for its full-size cars, such as dashboard parts, car registration plates and rocker covers at Bargoed. By 1965 over 500 men, all pneumoconiosis sufferers, were working at the factory. Production of the J40 pedal cars ended in 1971 but the factory's other work kept it open. Improving conditions in the mining industry and the slow reduction in the number of mines and workers in the region meant that the factory's purpose began to become redundant during the 1980s. The numbers employed slowly dropped and new workers did not have to be pneumoconiosis sufferers. The end of production of the Austin A-Series engine in 1999, the rocker cover of which was made solely in Bargoed, meant that the factory (then under the ownership of the Rover Group) employing 45 people, of which only 11 were registered as disabled, closed.

== Governance ==
An electoral ward with the same name exists. At the 2011 census this ward had a population of 6,196.

== Redevelopment ==
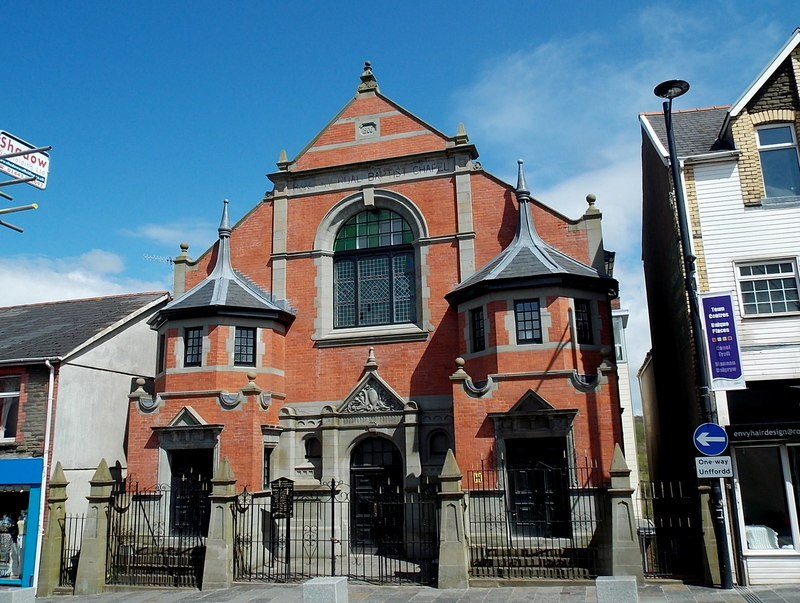
Baptist chapel converted to Public Library

The town has been undergoing a major redevelopment scheme, which included a bypass (running through the valley, with links to Bargoed town centre, Aberbargoed and Gilfach), Morrisons supermarket and petrol station, a new bus station, repaving the road though the heart of the town, a 400+ space car park, new library, 3 new offices, a relaxation area where the old bus station was on Hanbury Square, and 7 retail units. There are ongoing issues with plans for a state of the art Odeon Cinema and the site remains undeveloped (summer 2015). A redevelopment of the former Plasnewydd Hotel has created Murray's.

The Grade II* listed Hanbury Road Baptist chapel has been converted into a public library which includes a council services helpdesk, a computer suite, a coffee lounge, and a scaled-down chapel; the pipe organ (now silent), occupies its original dominant position overlooking the main ground floor area, while the erstwhile chapel gallery houses a substantial collection of reference and other books. At the rear of the library a new mini park has been created using 40 ft flower sculptures.

The sites of the former collieries of Bargoed, Gilfach, and Britannia have been landscaped as a recreational nature park with a network of paths on either side of the Rhymney river. Figures of mine workers from these three communities have become the inspiration for wooden sculptures in the park, while in Hanbury Square a group of three immense heads of colliery workers dominates the tiered piazza.

== Transport ==
The town is served by Bargoed railway station with services to Cardiff, Penarth, and Barry; Bargoed Bus Interchange is situated at the northern end of the town, with local services and routes to nearby Blackwood, Ystrad Mynach, Caerphilly, and Newport among others.

The A469 by-pass road connects with the A465 Heads of the Valleys road to the north and the A470 to the south, serving Cardiff and linking with the east-west M4 motorway.

== Education ==
Bargoed Grammar Technical School existed as the local grammar school before Heolddu Comprehensive School was formed. Some of the grammar school's buildings in Park Crescent were used from the 1980s until 2002 for the valley's first Welsh language comprehensive school, Ysgol Gyfun Cwm Rhymni, which has now moved to a new purpose-built site in Fleur-de-Lys. Primary Schools include St Gwladys Bargoed School, Park Primary School, Aberbargoed Primary School, Gilfach Fargoed Primary School and a Welsh school Ysgol Gymraeg Gilfach Fargod. Heolddu Comprehensive School serves the local area as the main secondary school.

== Sport ==
Bargoed currently has teams in football and rugby union. They are AFC Bargoed and Bargoed RFC.

There is also an 18-hole golf course, located in the town, which was opened in 1910.

== Notable people ==
- Hefin David (1977-2025), Member of the Senedd (MS), went to school in Bargoed and his office is based in Bargoed YMCA
- James Fox (born 1976), singer-songwriter and British Eurovision contestant
- Doris Hare (1905–2000), actress, born in Bargoed
- Alun Hoddinott (1929–2008), a composer of classical music, one of the first Welsh composers to receive international recognition
- Morgan Phillips (1902–1963), General Secretary of the Labour Party from 1944 to 1961, brought up in Bargoed
- John Tripp (1927–1986) Anglo-Welsh poet and short-story writer, born in Bargoed

=== Sports ===
- Nathan Cleverly (born 1987), World Champion boxer, grew up in Bargoed and went to Heolddu Comprehensive School
- Sam Cookson (born 1891), footballer, was born in Bargoed
- Bradley Dredge (born 1973), golfer, Golf World Cup winner, twice European Tour winner, is a lifetime member at Bargoed Golf Club and started his career here
- Graham Moore (1941–2016), played football for Bargoed YM (now AFC Bargoed), represented Wales 1959–1970.
- Steffanie Newell (born 1994), professional wrestler previously signed to WWE under the name Tegan Nox, born in Bargoed and attended Heolddu Comprehensive School
- Albert Powell (1908-1940), professional footballer, played in league for Swindon Town and Coventry City, was born at Bargoed
- Ivor Powell (1916–2012), former professional footballer and manager, was born in Gilfach-Bargoed on 5 July 1916
- Lauren Price (born 1994), professional boxer, Olympic Gold Medallist, attended Heolddu Comprehensive School in Bargoed and was brought up in Mc Donell Road, Bargoed
- David Probert (born 1988), British flat racing Champion Apprentice jockey 2008, attended Ysgol Gymraeg Gilfach Fargod and Ysgol Gyfun Cwm Rhymni
- Robbie Regan (born 1968) former world boxing champion grew up and trained in Bargoed, he still lives in the town
- Ray Bishop (born 1955), footballer, started his career at Bargoed AFC Youth before representing Cardiff City F.C amongst other clubs
