= Iorwerth Evans =

Wales international rugby union footballer

Iorwerth Evans Evans
- Born: 23 May 1906 Trelewis, Wales
- Died: 18 September 1985 (aged 79) Bedford, England
- School: Lewis School, Pengam
- University: Caerleon College

Rugby union career
- Position: Hooker
Amateur team(s)
Years	Team	Apps	(Points)
- Bedford Athletic RFC
–	Bedford RFC		
–	London Welsh RFC		
International career
Years	Team	Apps	(Points)
1934	Wales	2	(0)

Iorwerth Evans Evans (23 May 1906 – 18 September 1985 (aged 79)) born in Trelewis, was a Welsh rugby union footballer who played in the 1930s. He played at representative level for Wales, and at club level for Bedford Athletic RFC, Bedford RFC, and London Welsh RFC, as a Hooker. He died in Bedford.

== International honours ==
Iorwerth Evans won caps for Wales in 1934 against Scotland, and Ireland.
