= Albert Powell (footballer) =

Welsh footballer

Personal information
- Full name: Albert Elyston Edgar Powell
- Date of birth: 22 June 1908
- Place of birth: Bargoed, Wales
- Date of death: 18 October 1940 (aged 32)
- Position: Winger

Senior career*
Years	Team	Apps	(Gls)
1927	Bargoed		
1928–1929	Swindon Town	3	(0)
1929–1930	Coventry City	0	(0)
1930	Merthyr Town		
1930	Bargoed Athletic		
1932	Gilfach & Bargoed		
1933	Hereford United		
1934	Aberaman Athletic		
1934	Tredomen Works		
- * Club domestic league appearances and goals

Albert Elyston Edgar Powell (22 June 1908 – 18 October 1940) was a Welsh professional footballer who played as a winger in the Football League for Swindon Town.

== Personal life ==
Powell served as a gunner in the Royal Artillery during the Second World War and died on 18 October 1940. He was buried at Gwaelodybrithdir Cemetery, Glamorganshire.

== Career statistics ==
Appearances and goals by club, season and competition
Club	Season	Division	League		FA Cup		Total	
Club	Season	Division	Apps	Goals	Apps	Goals	Apps	Goals
Swindon Town	1928–29	Third Division South	3	0	0	0	3	0
Career total			3	0	0	0	3	0
