= Lewis Girls Comprehensive School =

Coordinates: 51°38′26″N 3°14′04″W

Lewis Girls’ School

Location
- Oakfield Street; Ystrad Mynach, Hengoed, Caerphilly, CF82 7WW; Wales

Information
- Motto: (Welsh language: HEDD (the Welsh word for 'Peace') standing for- Harmony, Excellence, Diligence and Dedication.
- Founders: Sir Edward Lewis
- Local authority: Caerphilly
- Chair of Governors: James Grashoff
- Headteacher: Lynette Denton
- Gender: Coeducational
- Age: 11 to 18
- Website: https://www.lgs.wales/

Lewis Girls' Comprehensive School was a secondary school in Wales. It stood at the border between Glamorganshire and Monmouthshire, divided by the Rhymney River which acts as the school fields' boundary. The school was established subsequent to its partner school, Lewis Boys' School, situated in Pengam. The origins of both of the schools come from the bequest of Sir Edward Lewis to set up the Boys' school, as Girls' became pupils and numbers swelled the division and separate educational provision evolved. In 1973, the school integrated with the Ystrad Mynach Secondary School for Girls to form the present comprehensive school in Ystrad Mynach, Wales. The Ystrad Mynach School, built in the late 1950s, was primarily established for female students, but begun to allow male students from local comprehensive schools to enroll in its sixth form and study subjects under Lewis Girls' teaching staff.

The school was closed and merged with Lewis School, Pengam in 2026, with the site being used as a lower school until expansion work is completed.
