= Goodwood Revival =

United Kingdom classic 1950s and 1960s car festival and races

Coordinates: 50°51′34″N 0°45′33″W

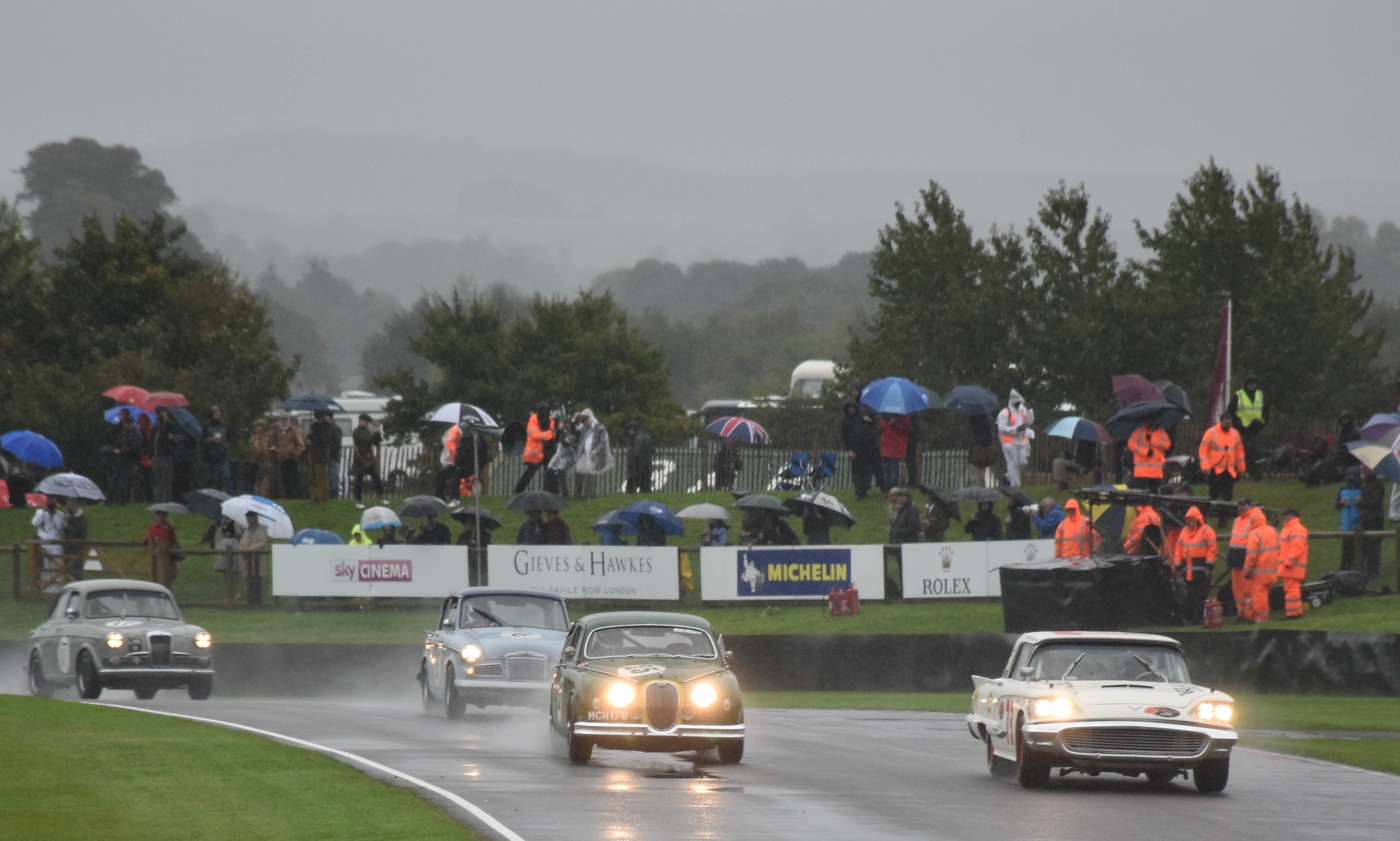
Goodwood Revival in 2017

The Goodwood Revival is a three-day festival held each September at Goodwood Circuit since 1998 for the types of racing cars and motorcycles that would have competed during the circuit's original period: 1948–1966.

== History ==
The first Revival took place 50 years after the 9th Duke of Richmond and Gordon opened the motor racing track in 1948, driving around the circuit in a Bristol 400, then Britain's state-of-the-art sporting saloon. Most people dress in period clothes. It is one of the world's most popular motor race meetings and the only United Kingdom event which recreates the 1950s and 1960s era of motorsport.

There was some opposition to the re-introduction of racing at the circuit, but a numerically strong lobby in the form of the Goodwood Supporters Association helped eventually to gain approval.

== Revival meeting ==
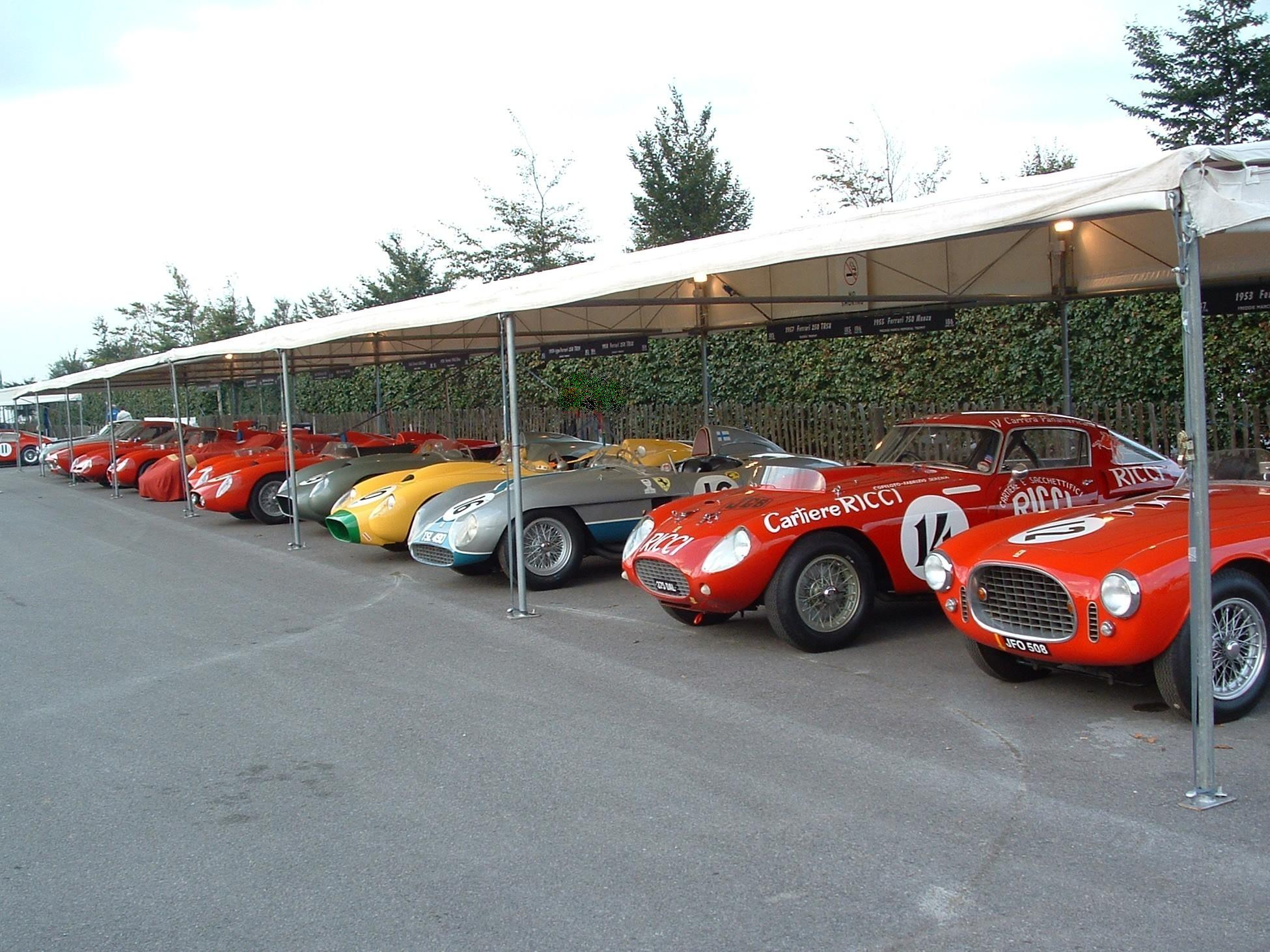
Ferrari paddock, 2004

The revival race meeting is a showcase for wheel-to-wheel racing around a classic circuit, untouched by more modern developments, and relives the glory days of Goodwood Circuit, which ranked alongside Silverstone as Britain's leading racing venue throughout its active years. Between 1948 and 1966 Goodwood hosted contemporary racing of all kinds, including Formula One, the Goodwood Nine Hours race, and the Tourist Trophy sports car race.

The meeting includes Grand Prix cars from the 1950s and 1960s, sports and GT cars, as well as historic saloon cars and little-seen Formula Juniors. Many of these important historic racing cars are driven by famous names from motor sport past and present. Famous drivers who have taken part include Sir Stirling Moss, John Surtees, Kenny Bräck, Sir Jack Brabham, Phil Hill, Derek Bell, David Coulthard, Damon Hill, Gerhard Berger, Martin Brundle, Tom Kristensen, Bobby Rahal, Johnny Herbert, Wayne Gardner, Giacomo Agostini, Jean Alesi, Barry Sheene and Peter Brock, as well as celebrities such as Chris Rea, Debbie McGee and Rowan Atkinson (as Mr. Bean in 2009).

=== Circuit ===
The circuit is unchanged from its heyday, remaining in its 1952 configuration when the chicane was added. No modern vehicles are allowed within the circuit perimeter throughout the weekend, except for modern fire and rescue vehicles. There are also theatrical sets that bring the past back to life, as well as many historic aircraft.

=== Races ===
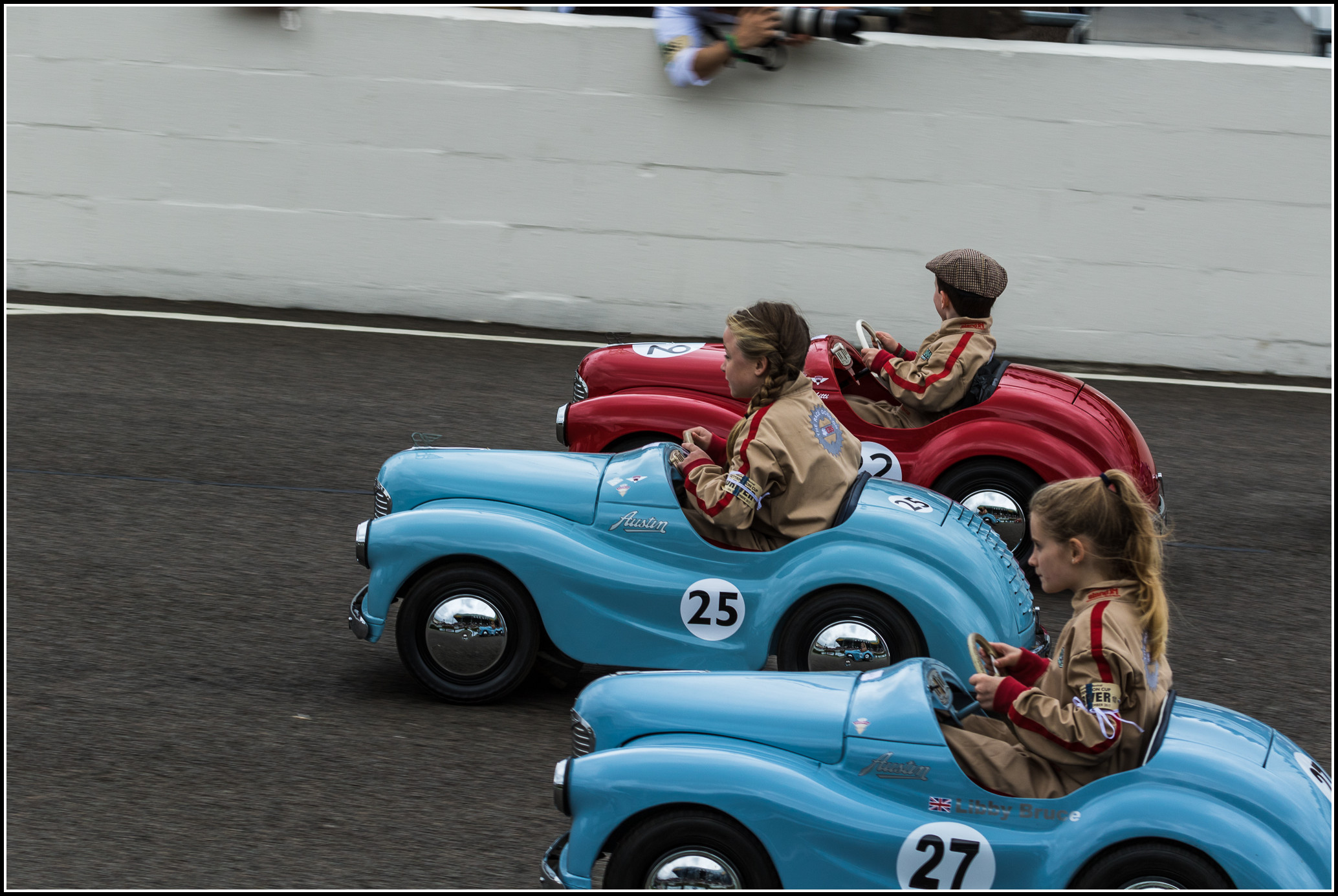
Settrington Cup, 2017

Races over the three days include:

- Stirling Moss Memorial Trophy (2016–present; formerly known as the Kinrara Trophy), a 1-hour race for GT cars that raced until 1963.
- Richmond & Gordon Trophies a 25 minute race for 2.5 litre Grand Prix cars from 1954 to 1960.
- St Mary’s Trophy, a Pro-am event made up of two 25 minute races decided on aggregate.
- Whitsun Trophy a 20 minute race for prototypes up until 1966.
- Royal Automobile Club Tourist Trophy Celebration, a one hour race for pro/ams for cars up until 1964 which raced in the RAC TT when it was held at Goodwood.
- Glover Trophy, a 20 minute race for 1.5 litre Grand Prix cars from 1961 to 1965.
- Goodwood Trophy, a 20 minute race for Grand Prix & Voiturette cars from 1930–1951.
- A pedal car race for youngsters called the Settrington Cup, featuring Austin J40 pedal cars. The name is derived from the Duke of Richmond’s subsidiary title “Lord Settrington”, traditionally held by the son of the heir to the dukedom.
