= Hefin David =

Welsh politician (1977–2025)

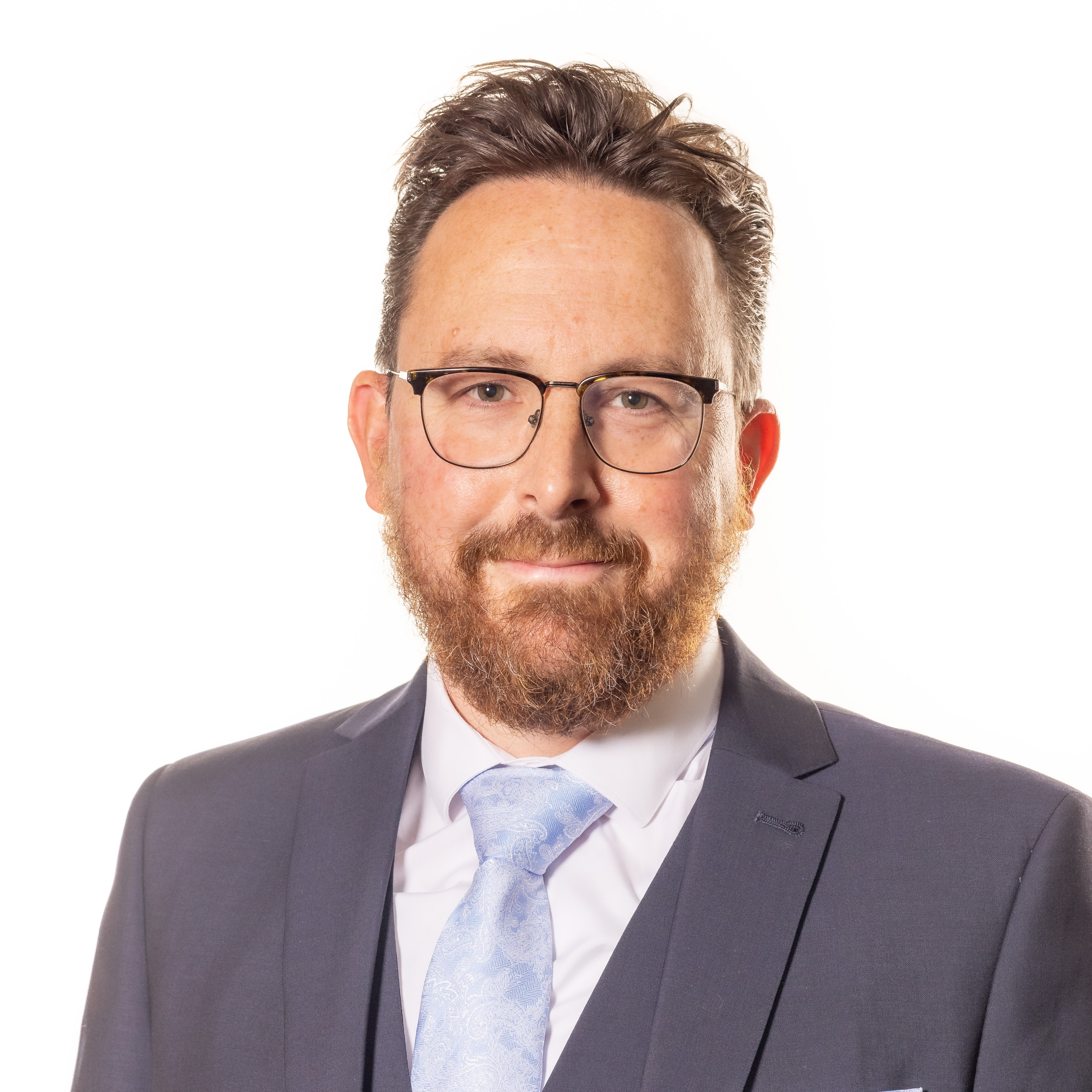
- Official portrait, 2021

Member of the Senedd for Caerphilly
- In office 5 May 2016 – 12 August 2025
- Preceded by: Jeff Cuthbert
- Succeeded by: Lindsay Whittle

Caerphilly County Borough Councillor for St Cattwg ward
- In office 15 March 2007 – 4 May 2017
- Preceded by: Keith Derrick
- Succeeded by: Ann Gair

Personal details
- Born: Hefin Wyn David; 13 August 1977 Caerphilly, Wales
- Died: 12 August 2025 (aged 47) Nelson, Caerphilly, Wales
- Party: Welsh Labour
- Domestic partner: Vikki Howells
- Children: 2

Hefin Wyn David (13 August 1977 – 12 August 2025) was a Welsh Labour politician and the Member of the Senedd (MS) for Caerphilly, where he lived.

His political interests were in small firm development and growth, employment and employability, access to further and higher education for those with additional learning needs, the development of valleys communities and supporting families with relatives that have autism.

== Early life ==
Hefin was born at Caerphilly Miners Hospital. He grew up in the village of Penpedairheol, which is close to Bargoed. He was educated at Heolddu Comprehensive School. Between 1995 and 1997 he completed his undergraduate degree at Cardiff University in Politics and Economics. He also completed his master's in European Policy at Cardiff University between 1998 and 1999. In addition to this, he completed his PGCE at the University of Wales, Newport (now the University of South Wales) in 2002 and his PhD in small business employment issues in 2013 at the University of Gloucestershire.

He was a senior lecturer in business management at the University of Wales, Newport between 2002 and 2008. He lectured HR Development and Practice at Cardiff Metropolitan University between 2008 and 2016. He also lectured in Germany, Greece, India and China.

== Political career ==
David was elected to Caerphilly County Borough Council in a by-election in March 2007 as a representative for the ward of St Cattwg. He served as councillor for the ward until he stood down before the local council elections in 2017. He was the chair of the Policy and Resources Scrutiny Committee between 2012 and 2016. During his time as chair the committee considered a number of issues in the public interest, such as alleviating the effects of the bedroom tax and reducing the use of Bed and Breakfast accommodation as emergency housing. He also helped to secure a £400,000 lottery grant from the National Lottery to demolish and re-build Tir-Y-Berth village hall.

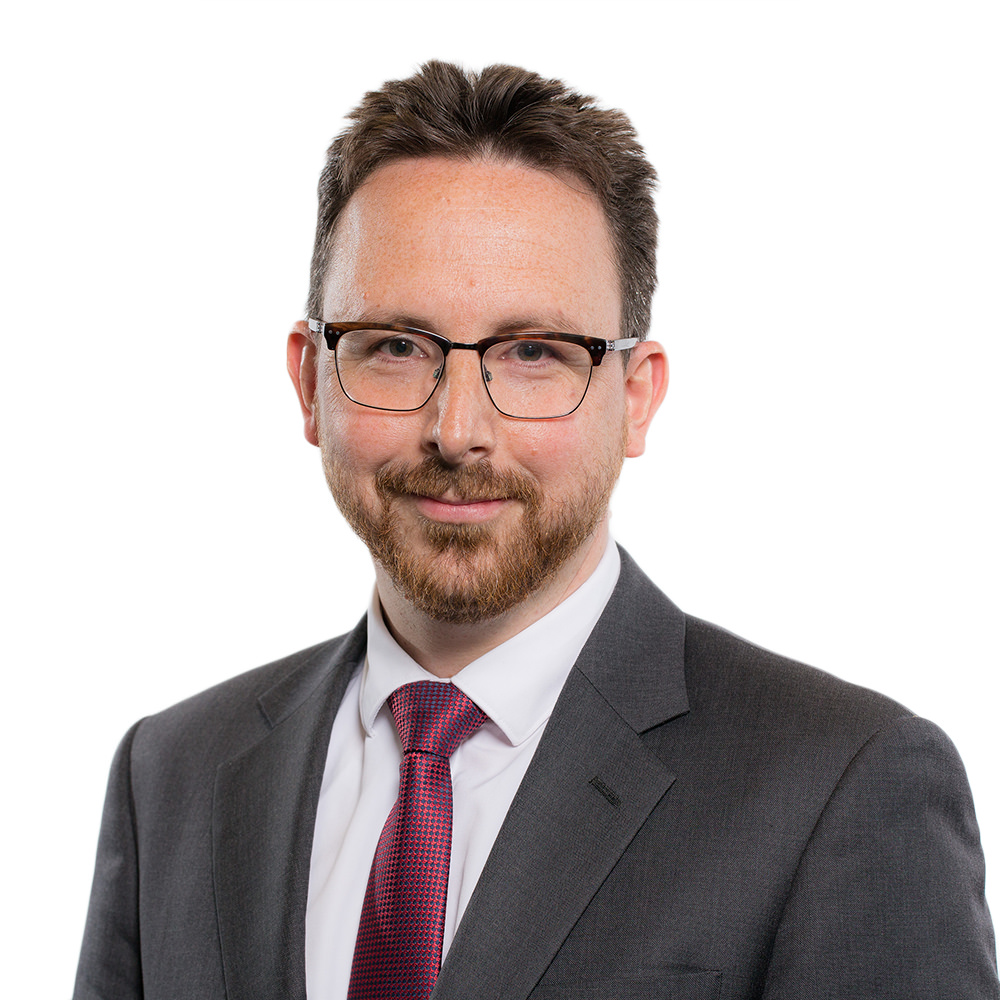
David in 2016

He was elected as a Senedd Member (MS) in 2016 to replace Jeff Cuthbert, who became Gwent Police and Crime Commissioner. In 2016 he won 35.35% of the vote before increasing his share to 45.96% in 2021. He sat on the committee for Economy, Trade and Rural Affairs and the committee for Culture, Communications, Welsh Language, Sport and International Relations. He also previously chaired the Cross Party Group on Universities and, with Rhun ap Iorwerth, was the co-chair for the Cross Party Group on Long Covid.

== Campaigns and policy ==
From his election he campaigned for freeholders who have estate management charges imposed on their properties. He called on the Welsh Government to cap estate management charges in Wales, and campaigned for stronger laws to control 'fleecehold'.

In 2022 he called on the Welsh Government to improve support services for people with neurodevelopmental diagnoses such as autism, ADHD and Tourette's.

He was commissioned by the Welsh Government to produce a piece of research that examined the experience of professionals supporting learners in the transition from education to employment. The report was published in June 2023 and is entitled 'Transitions to employment: A report for the Welsh Government'. Jeremy Miles, the former Minister for Education and the Welsh Language, said that the report produced by Hefin David "will extend our evidence base as we continue to develop our education and skills policy in the future."

== Personal life and death ==
David's partner was Vikki Howells, Member of the Senedd (MS) for Cynon Valley. He had two children, Caitlin and Holly, with his ex-wife Anna. Caitlin is autistic with learning disabilities.

He was a governor for Heolddu Comprehensive School and also a governor of Trinity Fields School and Resource Centre. In addition he was a supporter, and previously a trustee of the Caerphilly Miners' Centre.

David was found dead at his home in Nelson, Caerphilly, having died by suicide, by hanging, on 12 August 2025, a day before his 48th birthday. In a statement, Keir Starmer called him a "powerful voice for the people of Wales". On 26 August 2025, Gwent Coroner's Court said that final determination of the cause of death was pending a toxicology report and that there would be a full inquest. In January 2026, a coroner ruled that his death had been a suicide.

His death triggered the 2025 Caerphilly by-election, which was won by Plaid Cymru's Lindsay Whittle.

Senedd
Preceded by Jeff Cuthbert	Member of the Senedd for Caerphilly; 2016–2025	Succeeded by Lindsay Whittle
