= Pengam =

Village in Caerphilly, South Wales

- Location within Caerphilly
- Population: 3,848
- OS grid reference: ST158971
- Principal area: Caerphilly
- Preserved county: Gwent
- Country: Wales
- Sovereign state: United Kingdom
- Post town: BLACKWOOD
- Postcode district: NP12
- Dialling code: 01443
- Police: Gwent
- Fire: South Wales
- Ambulance: Welsh
- UK Parliament: Newport West and Islwyn
- Senedd Cymru – Welsh Parliament: Islwyn
- List of places UK Wales Caerphilly 51.66634°N 3.21885°W Map of the community

Pengam is a former coal village and community in the Rhymney Valley, Caerphilly county borough, in Wales. It is also a community, containing itself and the nearby village of Fleur de Lys, and at the 2001 census it has a population of 3,842, rising slightly to 3,848 at the 2011 Census.

Most of the village is on the east bank of the Rhymney River, in the historic county of Monmouthshire, but those parts of the village on the west bank are known as Glan-y-Nant and are in the historic county of Glamorganshire.

At the 2001 census, 3,842 people lived in Pengam, and there were about 1,561 homes. 1% of residents were from ethnic minority groups, 27.67% of people were between the ages of 20 and 39, and there were 797 people over the age of 60. 67.78% of residents owned their own homes either owned outright or with a mortgage. 24.79% of residents lived in council or housing association homes. 5.89% of residents lived in privately rented homes. 1.54% of residents lived completely rent-free. The population rose slightly to 3,848 at the 2011 Census.

The population density of Pengam is approximately 4,204 people per square mile (1623/km^{2}). The actual size of the electoral ward is 0.9 square miles (2.3 km^{2}).

The biggest employer in this area (with 29.42% of people) is the manufacturing industry.

Pengam is home to Ysgol Gyfun Cwm Rhymni, Pengam Primary School, Fleur-de-Lys Primary and Ysgol Trelyn.

== Coal and the railways ==
Two collieries previously existed in, or near, Pengam. One at the top of the Main Street (Pengam Pit), and the other was on the Aberbargoed Road (Britannia Pit).

The sinking of Pengam Colliery was begun in the late 1890s by the Rhymney Iron Company to work the Brithdir House coal seam at a depth of 312 yards. By 1908, it was employing 196 men and in 1918 the workforce numbered 518. During the late 1920s, it came under the ownership of the Powell Duffryn Associated Collieries Ltd., who employed 67 men there in 1938. The workforce numbered 195 in 1945.

As with most House Coal collieries in this area, Pengam was troubled with water inundation and heavy water pumps worked around the clock to avoid the mineworkings flooding. Production ceased in 1956 but it was kept open as an underground pumping station, to prevent the flooding of the nearby Britannia colliery. There was a landing, about halfway down in each of the Britannia shafts (North and South) from which it was possible to access Pengam pit bottom. The official entrance to Pengam colliery was adjacent to Pengam (Mon) station, on High Street previously known as Waunborfa Road.

Pengam at one time had two railway stations – one in Glamorgan and one in Monmouthshire. The line in Pengam (Mon) belonged to the Brecon and Merthyr Railway. Construction began in 1825 and it was opened in 1836, mainly to cater to the needs of the small pits and levels, and then increasingly for the collieries when they were sunk at the start of the century. It also accommodated the desire for more mobility by the rapidly growing population of the valley, when the steam locomotives pulled the passenger carriages up and down the line. The railway track from Newport to Brecon, or Tredegar, branched at Machen, the line going from there to Caerphilly and Merthyr Tydfil. The line branched behind Britannia Colliery for Brecon, or carried straight on to Tredegar where the line terminated.

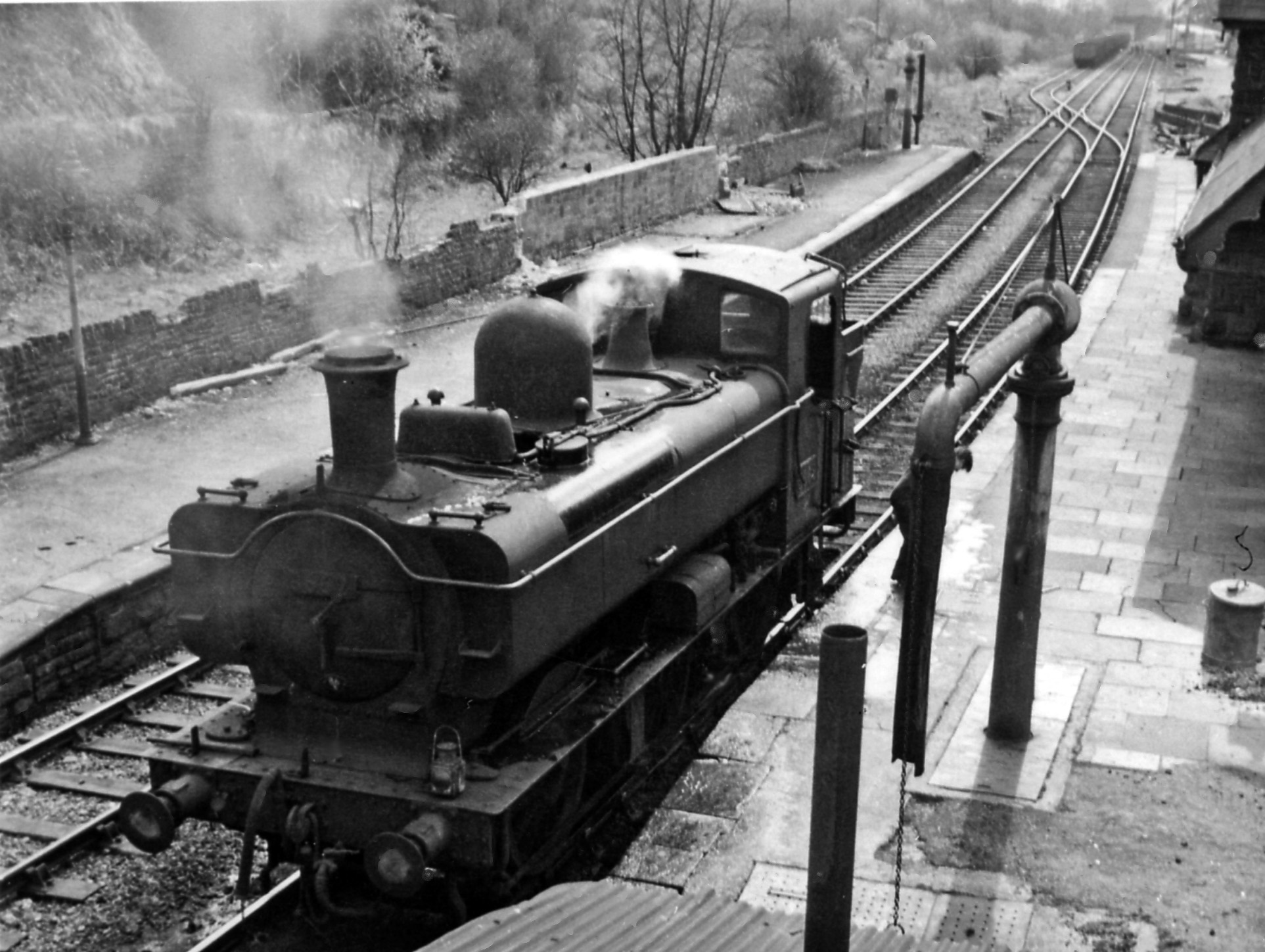
Light engine in 1965 at the station on the Brecon and Merthyr line

The locomotives hauling the coal trains along this line were pannier-tank type steam engines. The station, and stationmaster's house were directly adjacent to Pengam pit.

This closed in 1962. The other in Glamorgan was opened in 1858 by the Rhymney Railway and remains open as Pengam railway station.

Pengam was the location of the Austin Junior Car Factory set up by Leonard Lord, managing Director of the Austin Motor Company, to employ disabled Welsh miners making children's pedal cars. More than 30,000 Austin J40 pedal cars were built between 1949 and 1962. Apart from a few managers and trainers from Longbridge, the factory was considered unique in the world at the time for having a workforce that was 100% disabled – 60% of whom suffered from Complicated Pneumoconiosis.
