= Bargoed Town Hall =

Municipal Building in Bargoed, Wales

- Neuadd y Dref Bargod (Welsh)
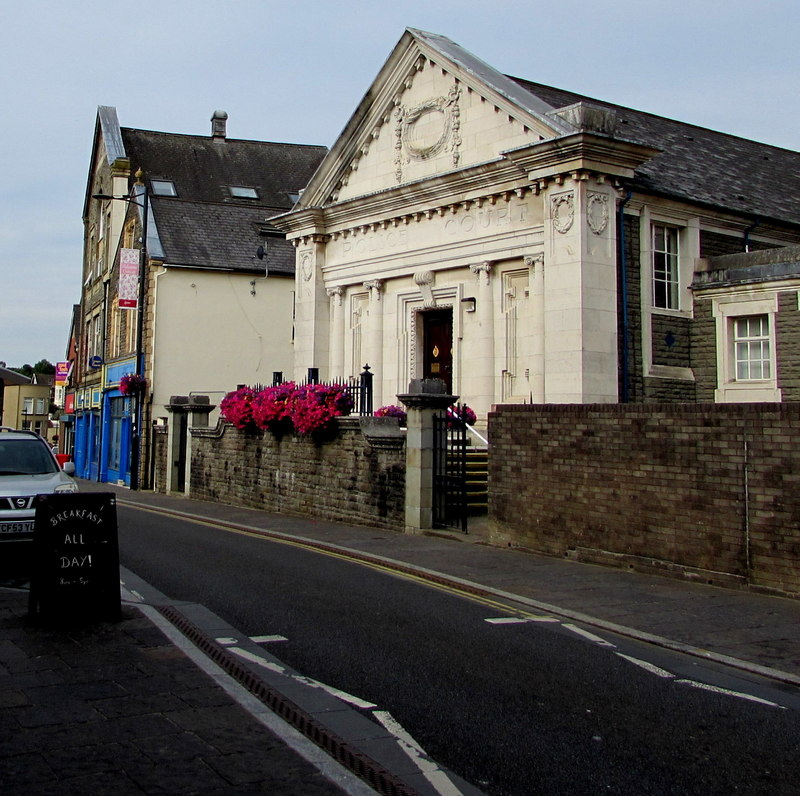
- The building in July 2018

- Shown in Caerphilly
- 51.6889°N 3.2293°W
- Location: Bargoed

History
- Built: 1911

Site notes
- Architect: George Kenshole
- Architectural style: Beaux-Arts style

Listed Building – Grade II
- Official name: Police Court and Police Station, including forecourt walls, gates & railings
- Designated: 29 April 2002
- Reference no.: 26493

Bargoed Town Hall (Welsh: Neuadd y Dref Bargod) is a municipal building located on Hanbury Road, Bargoed in the Rhymney Valley in Wales. The town hall, which is the meeting place of Bargoed Town Council, is a Grade II listed building.

== History ==
The older part of the complex is a police station constructed in 1904. A police court (later referred to as a magistrates' court) was subsequently erected to its left, the two joined by a cell block. The police court was designed by George Kenshole in the Beaux-Arts style and completed in 1911.

One of the most shocking cases before the court was a trial in 1965 when a group of 11 young people went on trial on a total of 41 charges of assault and related activity at Bargoed railway station. One of the victims had suffered a broken leg. The crime was described as "an extreme example of gangsterism in the locality".

The complex was grade II listed in 1992. The courthouse closed in 1997, and it was then occasionally used as an annexe to the police station.

In 2012, the Gwent Police and Crime Commissioner, Ian Johnston, sought other organisations who were prepared to rent the former courthouse (but not the police station) from Gwent Police. Meanwhile, Bargoed Town Council, which had been established in 1985 and had been based in a residential property known as The Settlement on Cardiff Road in Bargoed, had been seeking premises which would be more accessible for its residents. After a rental agreement had been entered into by the two parties, a programme of works was initiated to create a council chamber and an open plan office for the council within the former courthouse. The former courthouse was officially re-opened by the mayor of Bargoed, Howard Llewellyn, and the mayor of Caerphilly County Borough, David Carter, with Johnston also in attendance, on 28 June 2014.

In 2018, a painting by the artist, Olwen Hughes, depicting the Bargoed Emporium, was presented to the Gelligaer Historical Society and hung in the town hall. The emporium was a distinctive shop in the town, which had been completed in 1906.

== Architecture ==
The courthouse is single storey, and is in the Beaux-Arts style. It is built of ashlar stone, and has a slate roof. The design involves a symmetrical main frontage of three bays facing onto Hanbury Road. The central bay contains an opening with double doors, a moulded surround and a keystone, while the outer bays contain blind panels. The bays are flanked by Ionic order pilasters supporting an architrave and an entablature, inscribed "POLICE COURT", as well as a dentilled pediment containing a wreath with festoons. The police station, which is not part of the town hall, has two storeys and an attic, and is of three symmetrical bays, a lower bay to the left, and then a cell block. It is built of stone, with some chimneys of brick.
