= Fleur-de-Lis, Caerphilly =

Coordinates: 51°39′39″N 3°13′13″W

Fleur-de-Lis (also spelt Fleur-de-Lys, Welsh: Trelyn) is a village situated in the Rhymney Valley which is part of the South Wales Valleys within Caerphilly County Borough and administered as part of Caerphilly County Borough Council in Wales.

== History ==
The origin of the village's name traces back to the religious persecution of French Huguenots who, after leaving their original country of France, settled in the area and set up a spelter works and a brewery.

== Education ==
The local primary school is Ysgol Gynradd Fleur De Lys. The nearest secondary school is Ysgol Gyfun Cwm Rhymni, which is a Welsh-medium education school.
