= Ysgol Gymraeg Gilfach Fargod =

Location
- Gilfach, Caerphilly, CF81 8JG; Wales; 51°40′43″N 3°13′40″W

Information
- Type: State School
- Motto: Cenedl Heb Iaith, Cenedl Heb Galon
- Established: 1963
- Local authority: Caerphilly County Borough Council
- Language: Welsh (Cymraeg)
- Gender: Any
- Age: 3 to 11
- Medium: Welsh
- Estyn: 6762285
- Website: http://www.yggf.co.uk/

Ysgol Gymraeg Gilfach Fargod is a Welsh medium primary school located in the village of Gilfach, Bargoed in the County Borough of Caerphilly.

Established in 1963, Ysgol Gymraeg Gilfach Fargod was one of the first Welsh medium schools in the Rhymney Valley. It is a feeder school for Ysgol Gyfun Cwm Rhymni.

The school's Welsh language motto – "Cenedl Heb Iaith, Cenedl Heb Galon" – translates into English as "a nation without a language is a nation without a heart".

The school has 28 full- and part-time staff, comprising teachers, classroom assistants, nursery nurses, administrative and facilities and catering staff. The school currently has 194 pupils on its roll, with a capacity of 210 pupils.

The aging school buildings have resulted in calls for a new school to be built to replace the current premises.
