= St Martin's Comprehensive School =

Coordinates: 51°34′9″N 3°13′14″W

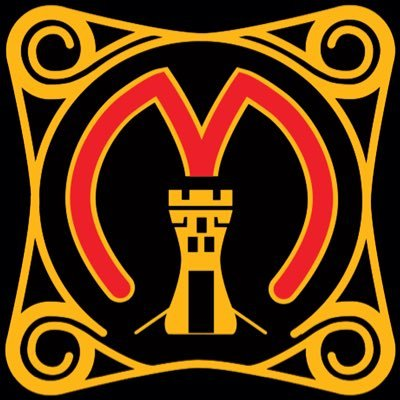

Location
- St.Martin's Road; Caerphilly, Caerphilly County Borough, CF832nj; Wales

Information
- Type: Comprehensive school
- Motto: Learning together, Achieving forever
- Local authority: Caerphilly County Borough Council
- Gender: Both
- Age: 11 to 18
- Colours: maroon, cyan
- Website: http://www.stmartins.caerphilly.sch.uk/

St Martin's Comprehensive School is a comprehensive school in the County borough of Caerphilly in Mid Glamorgan, Wales. It is located in Caerphilly town. The school website states the aim of school is that "each individual student leaves us, having succeeded to the best of their ability."

== Feeder schools ==
The majority of the students would have attended prior to starting at the school one of the following primary schools:

- Cwrt Rawlin Primary School
- Rhydri Primary
- St James Primary
- Plasyfelin Primary
- Coed-y-Brain Primary
- The Twyn School

== Notable Former Students ==
Here below are some of the former students that went to St Martins:

- Huw Anderson, born 2004, rugby union player for Dragons RFC
