= Heolddu Comprehensive School =

Location
- Mountain Road; Bargoed, Caerphilly, CF81 8XL; Wales; 51.688°N 3.245°W

Information
- Motto: Achieving Excellence Together
- Established: 1974; 52 years ago
- Local authority: Caerphilly Council
- Ofsted: Reports
- Head teacher: Nerys Davies
- Gender: coeducational
- Age range: 11–18
- Enrolment: 500
- Alumni: Hefin David Lauren Price
- Website: www.heoldducomprehensive.org.uk

Heolddu Comprehensive School is a school located in the town of Bargoed, South Wales, and serves the town of Bargoed as well as the villages of Deri, Aberbargoed, Tir-Phil, Cascade, Gilfach, New Tredegar and Brithdir in the Caerphilly LEA. The school has 700 pupils and 40 teaching staff.

== History ==
The building itself was constructed in 1974. Until 2017 the school's motto had been "opportunity for all", it was then changed to “Achieving Excellence Together”.

By 1989 the school began having classes in Japanese as a foreign language. Mike Howarth, then the headmaster, had taken Japanese classes.

== Alumni ==
- Hefin David – Member of the Senedd
- James Fox – Represented the UK in the 2004 Eurovision Song Contest.
- Lauren Price – Ex-footballer and professional kickboxer, competing at the 2014 and 2018 Commonwealth Games, Olympic Gold Champion.
- Tegan Nox – Professional wrestler formerly signed to WWE.
- David Price – Professional Golfer. Welsh Amateur Champion, Portuguese Amateur Champion and Welsh International, played on the European Tour . Studied at Heolddu and plays at Bargoed Golf Club
- Nathan Cleverly – European and World champion boxer
- Kieron Evans – Professional footballer
- Michael Coggan – Professional Baker and winner of Bake Off: The Professionals
