= Gilfach =

Coordinates: 51°40′44″N 3°13′58″W

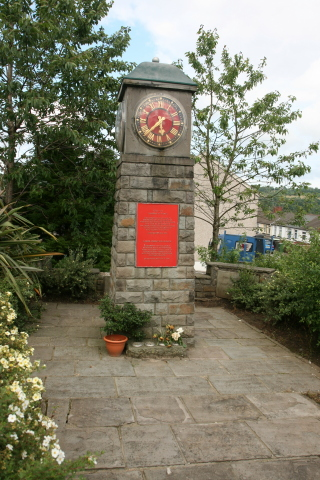
Garden of Peace at Gilfach

Gilfach is the small district that lies between Bargoed and Pengam, situated in the Caerphilly county borough, seven miles north of Caerphilly, within the historic boundaries of Glamorgan, Wales. The Bargoed ward had a population of 2,062 at the 2011 census.

The name Gilfach is derived from the Welsh words cil (nook) and bach (small).

Gilfach is the smallest of the three Electoral wards that make up Greater Bargoed (along with Bargoed and Aberbargoed).

Gilfach has many institutions, such as the Welfare Hall, Workingmen's Club, Scout Hall, and a YMCA building. There is also a bowling green and tennis courts.

As with many villages and towns through Britain, Gilfach has a War Memorial to the fallen of both world wars situated in the Garden of Peace.

There are two primary schools in Gilfach: Gilfach Fargoed Primary School, which teaches through the medium of English; and Ysgol Gymraeg Gilfach Fargod, which teaches through the medium of the Welsh language.

Gilfach has two places of worship:

- St. Margaret's parish church
- Ainon Baptist Church.

The village has two public houses the Gwerthonor Hotel now called Butters Bar and The Capel Hotel.

Gilfach has other businesses situated in the village, such as Hancox Pies, M&M Barbers, Best One convenience store and soon a tattoo shop. The Bowling club burnt down in 2022.

The village is served by Gilfach Fargoed railway station.
