= Austin J40 =

British model of pedal cars for children

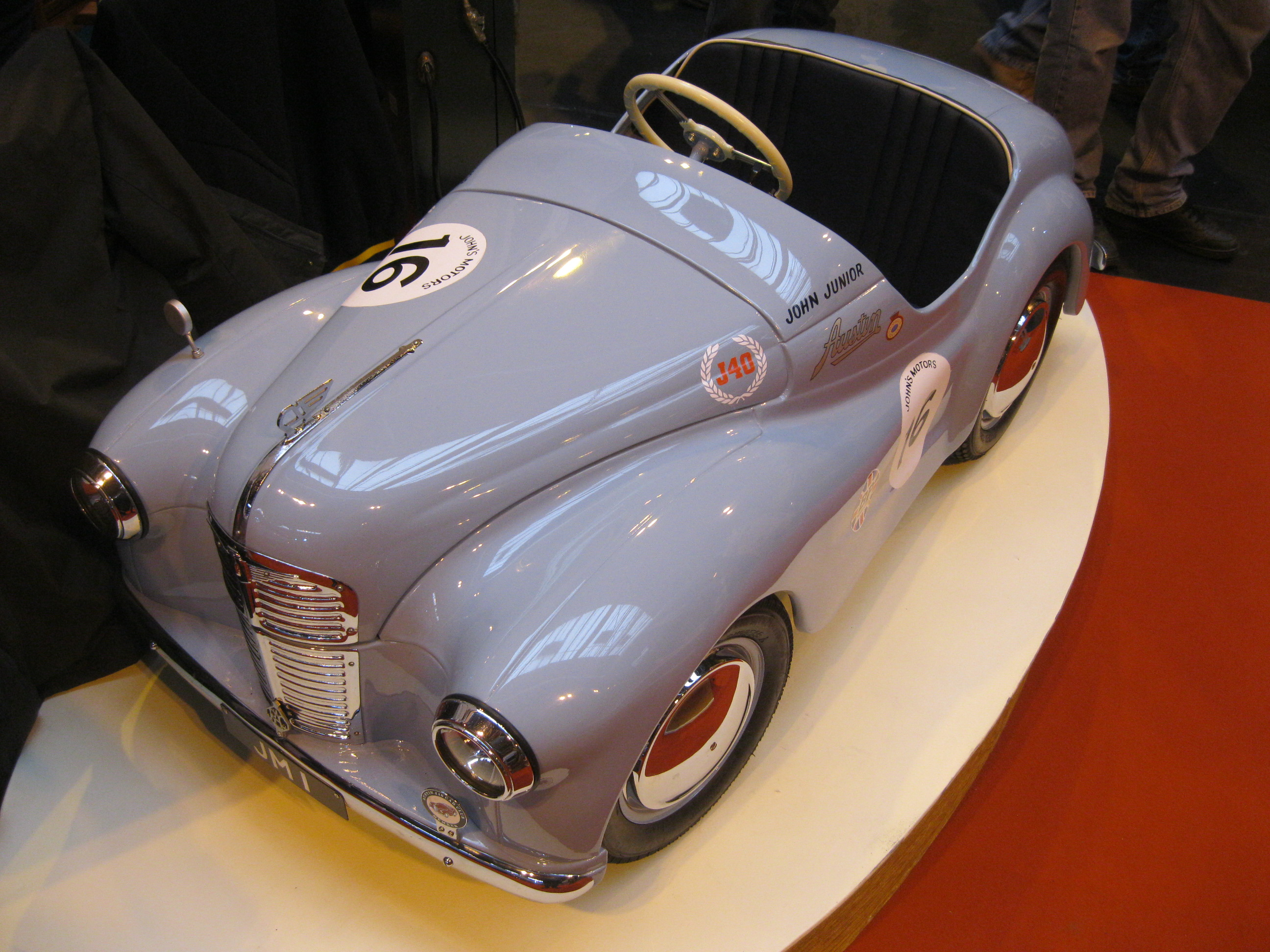
Austin J40 pedal car on display at the Classic Car show, NEC Birmingham, 15-17 November 2013

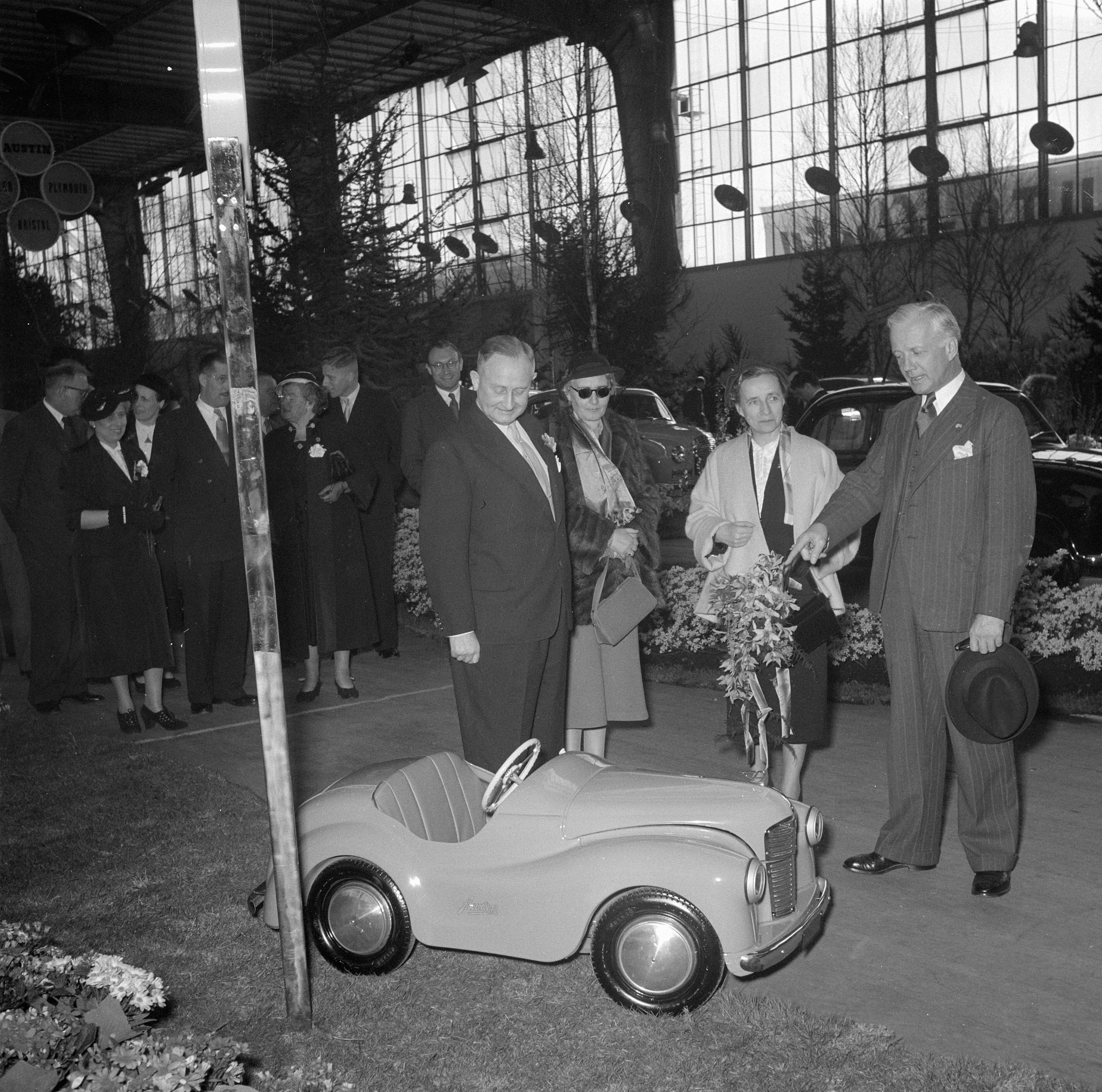
Opening of the car exhibition,1953

The Austin J40 was a luxuriously appointed children's pedal car, which was manufactured by The Austin Motor Company at the Austin Pedal Car Factory in Tir-y-Berth, Bargoed, Wales. Its place as a luxury item was heightened when Selfridges offered the J40 for sale from its famous central London store, standing out as the most spectacular of the other grand toys available for sale.

== History ==
The Austin J40 was the brainchild of Austin Chairman Leonard Lord. It developed into a social employment project in Wales. The designer of the J40 was Austin employee Jim Blaikie. Miners who had been declared unfit for work because of black lungs eligible to work at the factory that was set up for them. Some of the raw material used to make the J40 came from scrap and surplus material from the Austin factory in Longbridge. Apart from the fact that this company offered work to the ex-miners, it also offered a good training ground for future managers of the Austin Motor Company in dealing with all aspects of running a factory. The Austin Pedal Car Factory workforce grew from 50 to over 200 men. All factory floor workforce were designated 100% disabled.

The 1946 prototype, the Joy1, was based on the Austin 8, 10 12, and 16 road cars. Following the Joy2, Joy3 and Joy4 prototypes, the Pathfinder came in 1949, with a body based on the 1930s OHV Austin Seven Racer. Production of the Pathfinder began in July 1949 at the purpose built Austin Junior Car Factory, in Bargoed in South Wales, but Pathfinder production was phased out in 1950 due to the introduction of the J40. The two were buillt alongside one another for a very short time only, as factory space was needed to switch to making components for Longbridge production lines. The successor to the Pathfinder was the Austin Junior 40 Roadster (J40), which was based on the popular Austin A40 Devon and Dorset models and went into production from Autumn 1949. It featured an opening bonnet, an imitation engine with real spark plugs, battery powered headlights, a horn, a seat upholstered in imitation leather, an imitation instrument panel, detachable wheels with Dunlop tyres, an opening boot lid and a handbrake. Furthermore, many parts were chrome-plated. In 1957, an unofficial adapted lengthened version with a working petrol engine in the boot and rear-axle drive was made, in which the pedals were omitted. There was only one motorised official Austin J40 made - It was modified by Longbridge apprentices for Adrian Taber in 1974.

The J40 was initially intended as an export item to the United States, but later also to Canada and Denmark, and to many countries around the world In the Netherlands, the Austin J40 was imported by the company R.S. Stokvis.

Every year, the Settrington cup J40 race for children is held at the Goodwood Revival. The Austin J40 Pedal Car Club was founded in 1983. The cars were used on traffic park to teach road safety to children.They were adapted to be fairground rides and their cute and unique shape made them a must for advertising. A few J40 were dangerously converted with a petrol engine in the late 1950's and 1960. Up to the end of production in 1971, 32,098 J40s were manufactured.

The car was available in basic colours - red, blue, green and cream. A red one was also used as an attraction for taking children's photos, such as at Diergaarde Blijdorp in Rotterdam.

In 2022, British company Burlen Fuel Systems acquired the rights to the Austin Pedal Cars name and subsequently revealed a new Austin J40 at the Goodwood Revival later that year. The car entered production in 2023, featuring a hand-formed aluminium body, hand stitched leather seat and electronic instrument gauges, priced at £25,000.
