= Sam Cookson (English footballer, born 1891) =

English footballer

Samuel Percy Cookson (17 January 1891 – 1974) was an English footballer. His regular position was as a defender. He was born in Shrewsbury. He played for Manchester United and Bargoed Town.

He served in the Labour Corps in the First World War. He worked as a tanner and later a master tailor. He died in Shrewsbury, aged 83.
