= Ysgol Gyfun Cwm Rhymni =

Coordinates: 51.661°N 3.216°W

Location
- Ysgol Gyfun Cwm Rhymni Safle Gellihaf; Heol Gelli Haf; Blackwood, Caerphilly, NP12 3JQ; Wales

Information
- Type: Public School
- Motto: 'Tua'r Goleuni' (Towards the Light)
- Established: 1981
- Local authority: Caerphilly County Borough Council
- Staff: 100+
- Gender: Both
- Age: 11 to 18
- Enrolment: 1821 (2023)
- Houses: 4 (Cadog, Mabon, Sannan, Tudful)
- Publication: Clecs
- Welsh Government ranking: Yellow (support category)
- Estyn inspection reports: https://www.estyn.gov.wales/provider/6764103
- Website: http://www.cwmrhymni.com/

Ysgol Gyfun Cwm Rhymni is a Welsh-medium school situated in the village of Fleur-de-Lys in the Rhymney Valley. Cwm Rhymni was founded in 1981 with just over 150 pupils and has since grown to 1,684 pupils, with 1,164 at the Gellihaf campus and 520 at Y Gwyndy (September 2018).

The school's motto is “Tua'r Goleuni” (Towards the Light) and its badge is a dragon rampant. The school is traditionally represented by the colours red and black.

A new campus for Ysgol Gyfun Cwm Rhymni opened in the Caerphilly area in 2013 for years 7–11; Ysgol Gyfun Cwm Rhymni – Safle'r Gwyndy. The previous school is now called Ysgol Gyfun Cwm Rhymni – Safle Gellihaf to avoid confusion. The original Cwm Rhymni school was based in Aberbargoed (years 7–8) and Bargoed (years 9–13).

== History ==
Picture of the school from outside the front entrance

Cwm Rhymni was originally situated on two sites: a Lower school for years 7–8 in Aberbargoed and an Upper school for years 9–13 in Bargoed. By the late 1990s these buildings were in very poor condition, and after a long struggle the school was finally granted permission to build a new state-of-the-art single-site building in Fleur-de-Lys, which opened in 2002. The new building was funded through PFI. The original headmaster of Cwm Rhymni was Mr Huw Thomas, succeeded by Mr Hefin Mathias in 1995, Mr Owain ap Dafydd in 2008, and Mr Matthew Webb in April 2020.

=== 1989 fire ===
The former St Ilan school was destroyed by arson in 1989. On Wednesday 8 November 1989, Gareth Curtis (aged 16) and Paul James (aged 15) were sentenced at Cardiff to three years; the fire cost £2.2 million.

=== Headteachers ===
- 1981–1995 – Mr Huw Thomas
- 1995–2008 – Mr Hefin Mathias
- 2008–2020 – Mr Owain ap Dafydd
- 2020–present – Mr Matthew Webb

Ysgol Gyfun Cwm Rhymni has a strong reputation in sports, especially in rugby and athletics. The school has also regularly performed well in the Urdd Eisteddfod. In July 2024 the school celebrated a successful Estyn inspection.

Cwm Rhymni has a wide catchment area stretching from Rhymney to Caerphilly, reflected in the names of the three main corridors at the Gellihaf campus: Ebwy, Sirhywi and Rhymni. Before the foundation of Ysgol Gyfun Gwynllyw in 1988, the catchment area included the county of Gwent, with pupils coming from as far as Newport and Chepstow.

The school’s four houses are named after Welsh saints: Mabon (yellow), Cadog (green), Tudful (purple) and Sannan (blue). Tudful was added in the early 1990s. In 2009 a new house, Ilan, was introduced due to growing student numbers.

== Primary feeder schools ==
Ysgol Gyfun Cwm Rhymni is the only Welsh-medium comprehensive school in the Caerphilly borough and is fed by 11 primary schools:

- Ysgol Gymraeg Bro Allta (Gellihaf)
- Ysgol Gymraeg Bro Sannan (Gellihaf)
- Ysgol Gymraeg Cwm Derwen (Gellihaf)
- Ysgol Gymraeg Cwm Gwyddon (Gellihaf)
- Ysgol Gymraeg Caerffili (Gwyndy)
- Ysgol Gymraeg Gilfach Fargoed (Gellihaf)
- Ysgol Gymraeg Ifor Bach (Gwyndy)
- Ysgol Gymraeg Penalltau (Gellihaf)
- Ysgol Gymraeg Trelyn (Gellihaf)
- Ysgol Gymraeg Y Castell (Gwyndy)
- Ysgol Gymraeg Y Lawnt (Gellihaf)

== Partneriaeth 6 ==
Cwm Rhymni has a partnership with Ysgol Gymraeg Gwynllyw, Pontypool. Courses are delivered via staff travelling between schools or by conference link. The school is seeking to include Ysgol Gyfun Rhydywaun in the scheme.

== Notable former pupils ==
- Natasha Harding, professional footballer
- Sali Hughes, journalist, writer, and podcaster
- Delyth Jewell, politician
- Steffan Jones, professional cricketer
- Rhodri Lloyd, professional rugby league player
- David Probert, jockey
- Aaron Ramsey, professional football manager and player
