= Rhondda =

Urban area and district in South Wales

Coordinates: 51.615938°N 3.417521°W

- Valley region
- Map showing the Rhondda constituency within Wales
- Sovereign state: United Kingdom
- Constituent country: Wales
- County borough: Rhondda Cynon Taf
- Parliamentary constituency: Rhondda and Ogmore

Area
  - Total: 38.59 sq mi (99.94 km^{2})
- Highest elevation: 1,940 ft (590 m)

Population (2020)
  - Total: 69,506
  - Density: 1,801/sq mi (695.5/km^{2})
- Time zone: UTC+0 (Greenwich Mean Time)
  - Summer (DST): UTC+1 (British Summer Time)
- Postal code: CF postcode area
- Area code: 01443

Rhondda /ˈrɒnðə/, or the Rhondda Valley (Welsh: Cwm Rhondda [kʊm ˈr̥ɔnða]), is a former coalmining area in South Wales, historically in the county of Glamorgan. It takes its name from the River Rhondda, and embraces two valleys – the larger Rhondda Fawr valley (mawr, 'large') and the smaller Rhondda Fach valley (bach, 'small') – so that the singular "Rhondda Valley" and the plural are both commonly used. The area forms part of the South Wales Valleys. From 1897 until 1996 there was a local government district of Rhondda. The former district at its abolition comprised 16 communities. Since 1996 these 16 communities of the Rhondda have been part of Rhondda Cynon Taf County Borough. The area of the former district is still used as the Rhondda Senedd constituency and Westminster constituency, having an estimated population in 2020 of 69,506. It is most noted for its historical coalmining industry, which peaked between 1840 and 1925. The valleys produced a strong Nonconformist movement manifest in the Baptist chapels that moulded Rhondda values in the 19th and early 20th centuries. It is also known for its male voice choirs and in sport and politics.

== Etymology ==
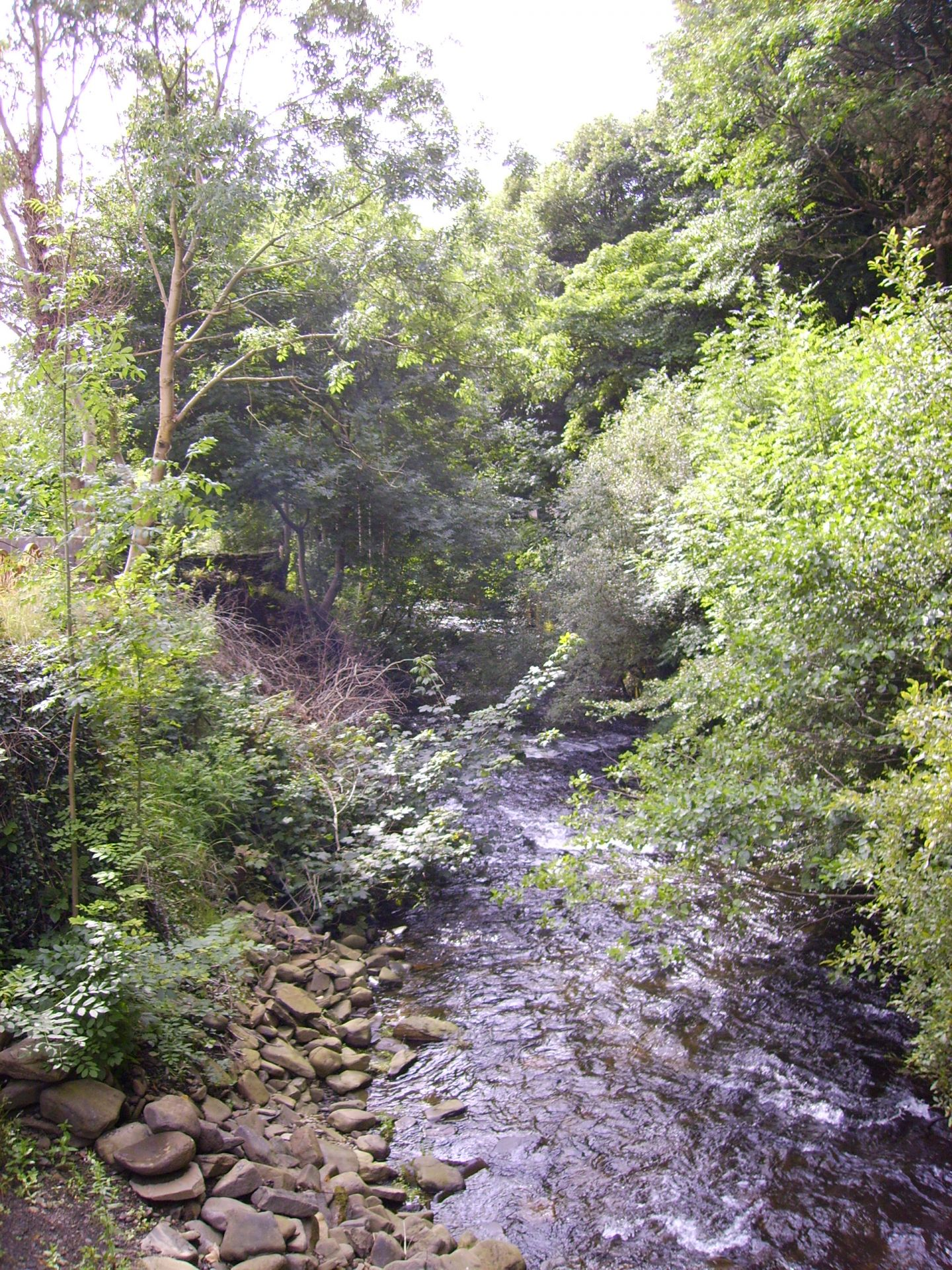
River Rhondda in the Fawr Valley near its source in Blaenrhondda

In the early Middle Ages, Glynrhondda was a commote of the cantref of Penychen in the kingdom of Morgannwg, a sparsely populated agricultural area. The spelling of the commote varied widely, as the Cardiff Records show:

- Rhoddeni (1203)
- Rotheni (1213)
- Glyn Rhoddni (1268)
- Glenrotheney (1314)
- Glynroddne (1314)
- Glynroddney (1348)
- Glynrotheney (1440)
- Glynrothnei (1567)
- Glynrhoddeney (1591)
- Glynronthey (1666)

Many sources state the meaning of Rhondda as "noisy", though this is a simplified translation without research. Sir Ifor Williams, in his work Enwau Lleoedd, suggests that the first syllable rhawdd is a form of the Welsh adrawdd or adrodd, as in 'recite, relate, recount', similar to the Old Irish rád; 'speech'. The suggestion is that the river is speaking aloud, a comparison to the English expression "a babbling brook".

With the increase in population from the mid-19th century the area was officially recognised as the Ystradyfodwg Local Government District in 1877, but was renamed in 1897 as the Rhondda Urban District after the River Rhondda.

== Early history ==
=== Prehistoric and Roman Rhondda: 8,000 BC – 410 AD ===
The Rhondda Valley is located in the upland, or Blaenau, area of Glamorgan. The landscape of the Rhondda was formed by glacial action during the last ice age, as slow-moving glaciers gouged out the deep valleys that exist today. With the retreat of the ice sheet, around 8000 BC, the valleys were further modified by stream and river action. This left the two river valleys of the Rhondda with narrow, steep-sided slopes which would dictate the layout of settlements from early to modern times.

==== Mesolithic period ====
The earliest evidence of man's presence in these upper areas of Glamorgan was found in 1963 at Craig y Llyn. A small chipped stone tool found at the site, recorded as possibly being of Creswellian type or at least from the early Mesolithic period, places human activity on the plateau above the valleys. Many other Mesolithic items have appeared in the Rhondda, mainly in the upper areas around Blaenrhondda, Blaencwm and Maerdy, and relating to hunting, fishing and foraging, which suggests seasonal nomadic activity. Though no definite Mesolithic settlements have been located, the concentration of finds at the Craig y Llyn escarpment suggests the presence of a temporary campsite in the vicinity.

==== Neolithic period ====
The first structural relic of prehistoric man was excavated in 1973 at Cefn Glas near the watershed of the Rhondda Fach river. The remains of a rectangular hut with traces of drystone wall foundations and postholes was discovered; while radiocarbon dating of charcoal found at the site dated the structure as late Neolithic.

==== Bronze Age ====
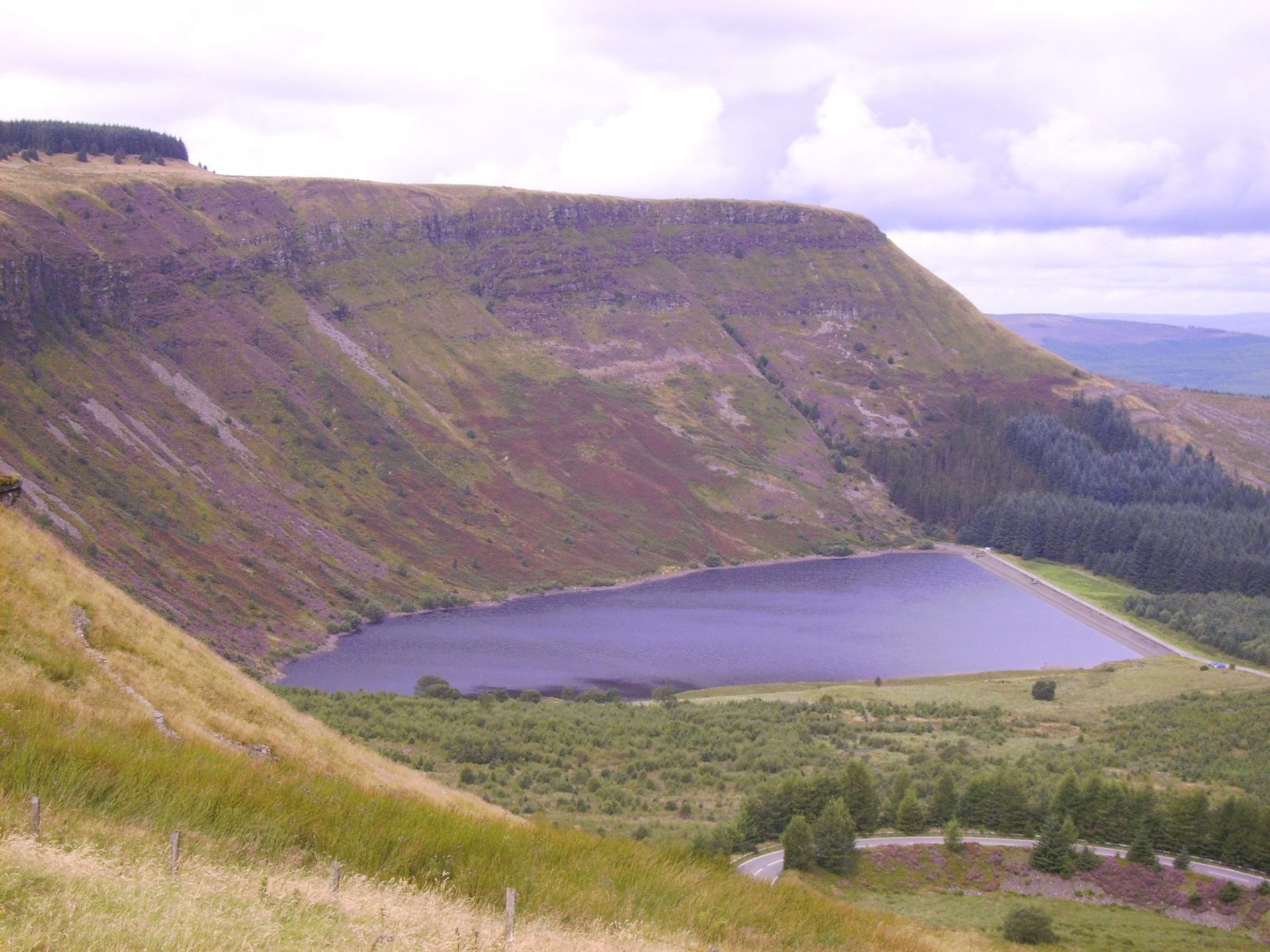
Llyn Fawr Reservoir in 2008

Although little evidence of settlement has been found in the Rhondda for the Neolithic to Bronze Age periods, several cairns and cists have appeared throughout the length of both valleys. The best example of a round-cairn was found at Crug yr Afan, near the summit of Graig Fawr, west of Cwmparc. It consisted of an earthen mound with a surrounding ditch 28 metres in circumference and over 2 metres tall (91.9 ft × 6.6 ft). Although most cairns discovered in the area are round, a ring cairn or cairn circle exists on Gelli Mountain. Known as the Rhondda Stonehenge, it consists of ten upright stones no more than 60 cm (24 in) in height, encircling a central cist. All the cairns found within the Rhondda are located on high ground, many on ridgeways, and may have been used as waypoints.

In 1912, a hoard of 24 late Bronze Age weapons and tools was discovered during construction work at the Llyn Fawr reservoir, at the source of the Rhondda Fawr. The items did not originate from the Rhondda and are thought to have been left at the site as a votive offering. Of particular interest are fragments of an iron sword, the earliest iron object to be found in Wales, and the only C-type Hallstatt sword recorded in Britain.

==== Iron Age ====
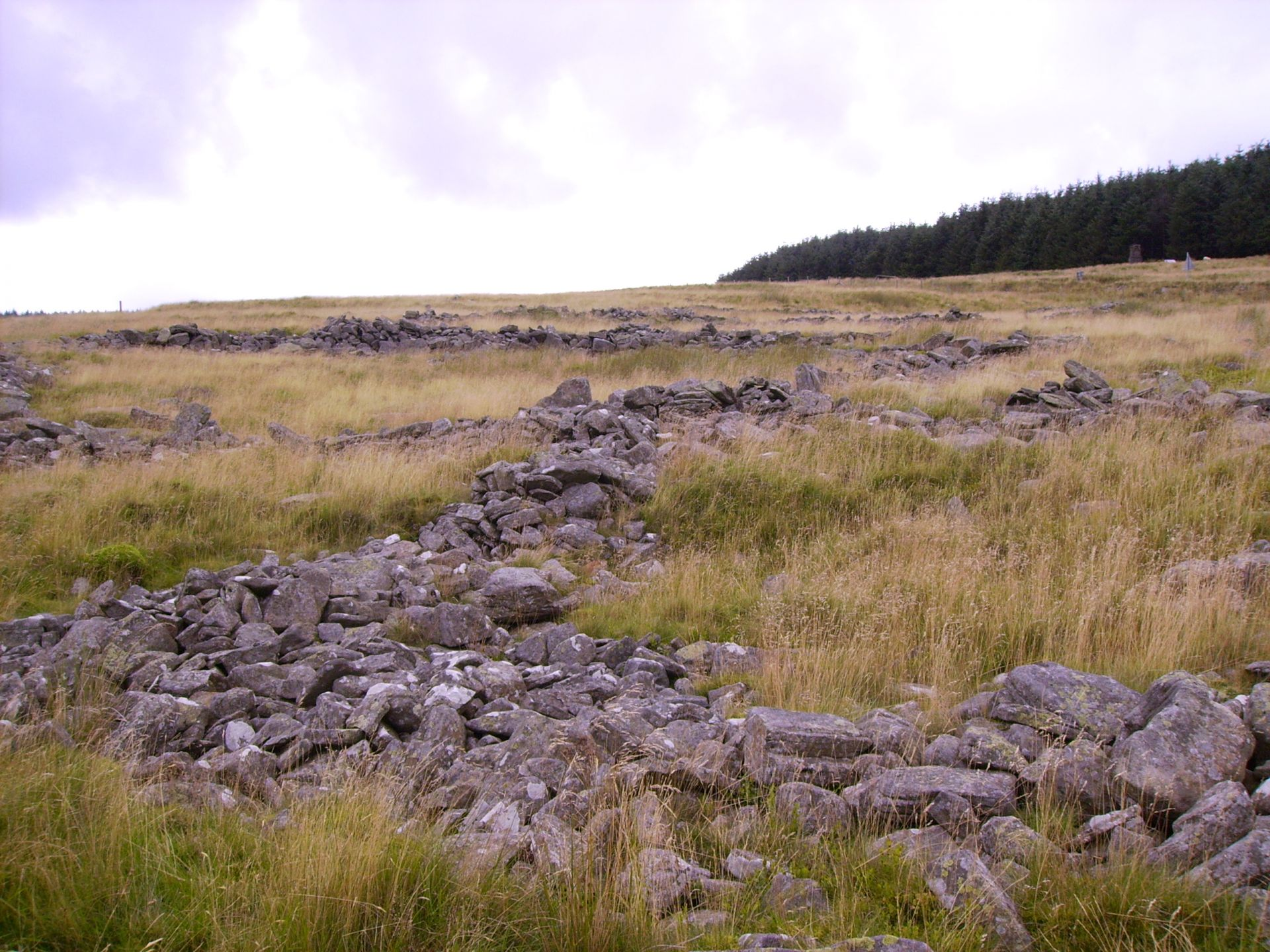
The ruins of the Hen Dre'r Mynydd settlement at the head of the Rhondda

With the exception of the Neolithic settlement at Cefn Glas, there are three certain pre-medieval settlement sites in the valley – Maendy Camp, Hen Dre'r Gelli and Hen Dre'r Mynydd. The earliest of these is Maendy Camp, a hillfort whose remains lie between Ton Pentre and Cwmparc. Although its defences would have been slight, the camp made good use of the natural slopes and rock outcrops to its north-east face. It consisted of two earthworks: an inner and outer enclosure. When the site was excavated in 1901, several archaeological finds led to the camp being misidentified as Bronze Age. These finds, mainly pottery and flint knives, were excavated from a burial cairn discovered within the outer enclosure, but the site has since been classified as from the Iron Age.

The settlement at Hen Dre'r Mynydd in Blaenrhondda was dated around the Roman period, when fragments of wheel-made Romano-British pottery were discovered. The site consists of a group of ruinous drystone roundhouses and enclosures, thought to have been a sheep-farming community.

The most certain example of a Roman site in the area is found above Blaenllechau in Ferndale. The settlement is one of a group of earthworks and indicates the presence of the Roman army during the 1st century AD. It was thought to be a military site or marching camp.

=== Medieval Rhondda: AD 410–1550 ===
The 5th century saw the withdrawal of Imperial Roman support from Britain, and succeeding centuries saw the emergence of national identity and of kingdoms. The area which would become the Rhondda lay within Glywysing, which incorporated the modern area of Glamorgan and was ruled by a dynasty founded by Glywys. This dynasty was replaced by another founded by Meurig ap Tewdrig, whose descendant Morgan ap Owain would give Glamorgan its Welsh name Morgannwg. With the coming of the Norman overlords after the 1066 Battle of Hastings, south-east Wales was divided into five cantrefi. The Rhondda lay within Penychen, a narrow strip running between modern-day Glyn Neath and the coast between Cardiff and Aberthaw. Each cantref was further divided into commotes, with Penychen made up of five such commotes, one being Glynrhondda.

Relics of the Dark Ages are rare in the Glamorgan area and secular monuments still rarer. The few sites found have been located in the Bro, or lowlands, leaving historians to believe the Blaenau were sparsely inhabited, maybe only visited seasonally by pastoralists. A few earthwork dykes are the only structural relics in the Rhondda area from this period. No carved stones or crosses exist to indicate the presence of a Christian shrine. In the Early Middle Ages, communities were split between bondmen, who lived in small villages centred on a court or llys of the local ruler to whom they paid dues, and freemen, with higher status, who lived in scattered homesteads. The most important village was the mayor's settlement or maerdref. Maerdy in the Rhondda Fach has been identified as such, mainly on the strength of the name, though the village did not survive past the Middle Ages. The largest concentration of dwellings from the period, mainly platform houses, have been found around Gelli and Ystrad in the Rhondda Fawr.

During the late 11th century, the Norman lord, Robert Fitzhamon entered Morgannwg in an attempt to gain control of the area, building many earth and timber castles in the lowlands. In the early 12th century Norman expansion continued, with castles being founded around Neath, Kenfig and Coity. In the same period Bishop Urban set up the Diocese of Llandaff under which Glynrhondda belonged to the large parish of Llantrisant.

After the death of William, Lord of Glamorgan, his extensive holdings were eventually granted to Gilbert de Clare in 1217. The subjugation of Glamorgan, begun by Fitzhamon, was completed by the powerful De Clare family. Although Gilbert de Clare had now become one of the great Marcher Lords, the territory was far from settled. Hywel ap Maredudd, lord of Meisgyn captured his cousin Morgan ap Cadwallon and annexed Glynrhondda in an attempt to reunify the commotes under a single native ruler. This conflict was unresolved by the time of De Clare's death and the area fell under royal control.

==== Settlements of medieval Rhondda ====
Little evidence exists of settlements within the Rhondda in the Norman period. Unlike the communal dwellings of the Iron Age, the remains of medieval buildings discovered in the area follow a pattern similar to modern farmsteads, with separate holdings spaced out around the hillsides. The evidence of medieval Welsh farmers comes from remains of their buildings, with the foundations of platform houses being discovered spaced out through both valleys. When the sites of several platform houses at Gelligaer Common were excavated in the 1930s, potsherds from the 13th to 14th centuries were discovered.

The Rhondda also has remains of two medieval castles. The older is Castell Nos, located at the head of the Rhondda Fach overlooking Maerdy. The only recorded evidence of Castell Nos is a mention by John Leland, who stated, "Castelle Nose is but a high stony creg in the top of an hille". The castle comprises a scarp and ditch forming a raised platform and on the north face is a ruined dry-stone building. Its location and form do not appear to be Norman and it is thought to have been built by the Welsh as a border defence, which would date it before 1247, when Richard de Clare seized Glynrhondda. The second castle is Ynysygrug, close to what is now Tonypandy town centre. Little remains of this motte-and-bailey earthwork defence, as much was destroyed when Tonypandy railway station was built in the 19th century. Ynysygrug is dated around the 12th or early 13th century and has been misidentified by several historians, notably Owen Morgan in his History of Pontypridd and Rhondda Valleys, who recorded it as a druidic sacred mound. Iolo Morganwg erroneously believed it to be the burial mound of king Rhys ap Tewdwr.

The earliest Christian monument in the Rhondda is the shrine of St Mary at Penrhys, whose holy well was mentioned by Rhisiart ap Rhys in the 15th century.

=== Post-medieval and pre-industrial Rhondda: 1550–1850 ===
In the mid-16th century the Rhondda, then known as the Vale of Rotheney, belonged to the large but sparsely inhabited parish of Ystradyfodwg, St Tyfodwg's Vale. It was divided administratively into three hamlets: the upper or Rhigos hamlet to the north, the middle or Penrhys hamlet, and the lower or Clydach hamlet. Through the post-medieval period the Rhondda was heavily wooded and its main economic staple the rearing of sheep, horses and cattle. The historian Rice Merrick, in describing the upland area of the Vale of Glamorgan, noted there "was always great breeding of cattle, horses and sheep; but in elder time therein grew but small store of corn, for in most places there the ground was not thereunto apt". The English cartographer John Speed described cattle rearing as the "best means unto wealth that the Shire doth afford". As there was no fair held in the Rhondda, the beasts were taken to neighbouring markets at Neath, Merthyr, Llantrisant, Ynysybwl and Llandaff. However, to be self-supporting, farmers in the area grew crops such as oats, corn and barley in small quantities. Crops were grown in the lower part of the Rhondda on narrow meadows adjoining riversides, though during the Napoleonic Wars scarce supplies forced cultivation of upland areas such as Carn-y-wiwer and Penrhys. Merrick described the diet of the upland inhabitants as consisting of "bread made of wheat... and ale and bear" [sic] and over 200 years later Benjamin Malkin showed how little the diet had changed when he wrote that the people still ate "oatmeal bread, with a relish of miserable cheese; and the beer, where they have any, is worse than none".

In the first half of the 17th century, rising costs of consumable goods and successive bad harvests brought economic change in Glamorgan. Those wealthy enough could seize chances created by the unsettled conditions and set about enlarging and enclosing farmlands. The enclosure of freehold lands begun in the later Middle Ages now gained momentum and farms once owned by individual farmers passed to groups of wealthy landowners. By the 19th century, most Rhondda farms and estates were owned by absentee landlords such as the Marquis of Bute, Earl of Dunraven, Crawshay Bailey of Merthyr and the De Winton family of Brecon.

==== Settlements of post-medieval Rhondda ====
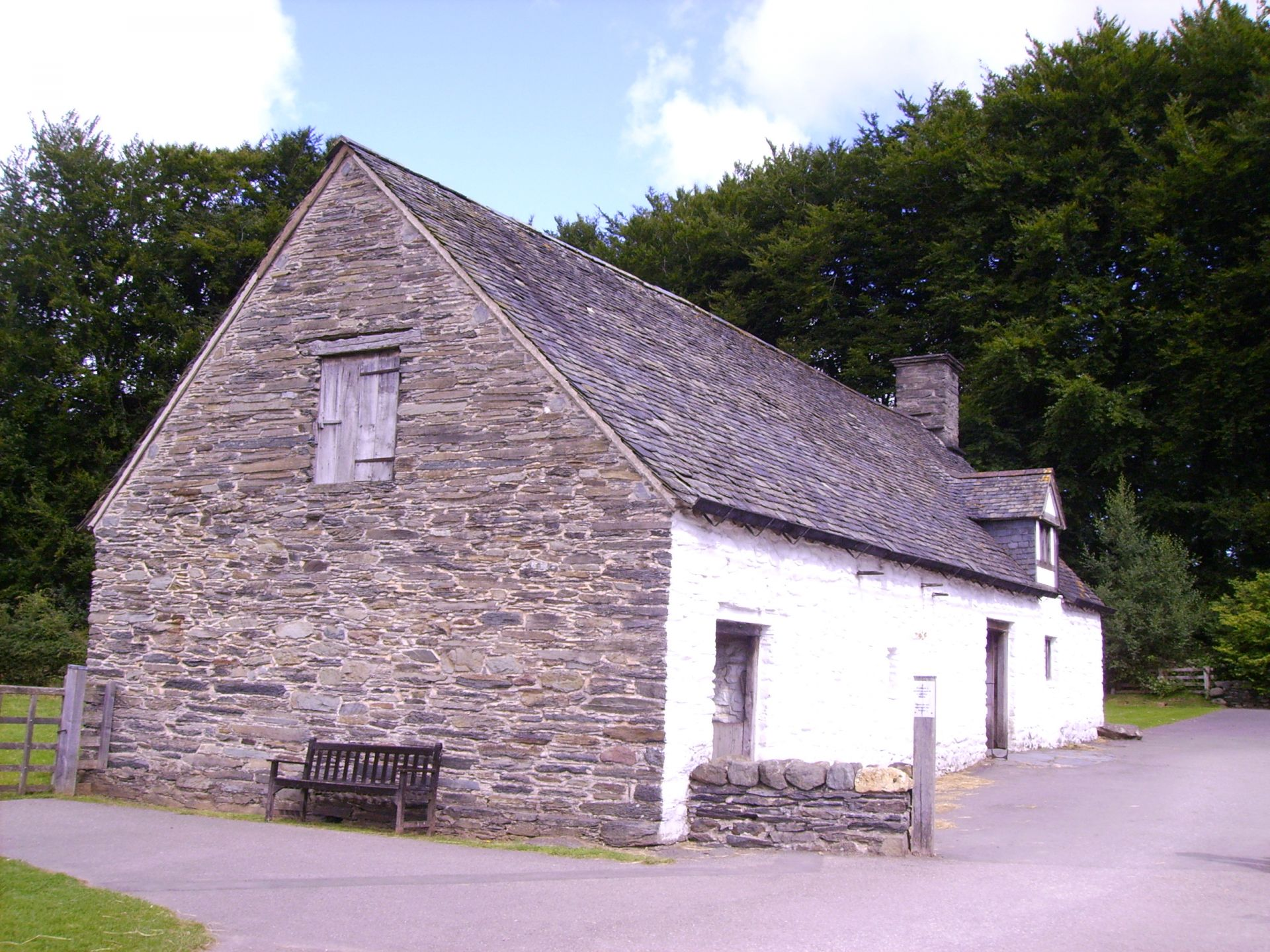
1735 Welsh (Powys) longhouse typical of those found in mediaeval Rhondda.

The Acts of Union in the mid-16th century and the English Civil War in the mid-17th century brought much rebuilding in the Kingdom of England, to which Wales was now annexed. This appears in the structures built in the Rhondda Valley. The fluctuating economy of the late Tudor period resulted in farmers taking in more land, creating higher levels of surplus goods and so producing higher profits. These were reflected in new farmhouses built in the Rhondda and for the first time an emphasis on domestic comfort apparent in the design of dwellings. Many new farm buildings were simple structures of two or three small rooms, but of a much sturdier, more permanent quality than the medieval platform houses. A popular style was the Dartmoor longhouse, which combined the house and cowshed into one building. By 1840, the Rhondda had at least 160 farms, but most were destroyed with the growth of the mining industry. Of the few survivors, those of note include Tynewydd ('New House') in Tynewydd, a 17th-century house thought to have given its name to the neighbouring village of Tynewydd and of Tyntyle in Ystrad dated around 1600.

There were few industrial buildings before 1850; those of note include a 17th-century blast furnace at Pontygwaith which gave the village its name. and a fulling mill established by Harri David in 1738, which in turn gave its name to Tonypandy. Corn mills existed sparsely throughout the valleys, as did early coal pits, two being recorded as opening in 1612 at Rhigos and Cwmparc, though they would have been open-cast, not deep mined.

== Industrial Rhondda 1850–1945 ==
=== Industrial growth (1850–1914) ===
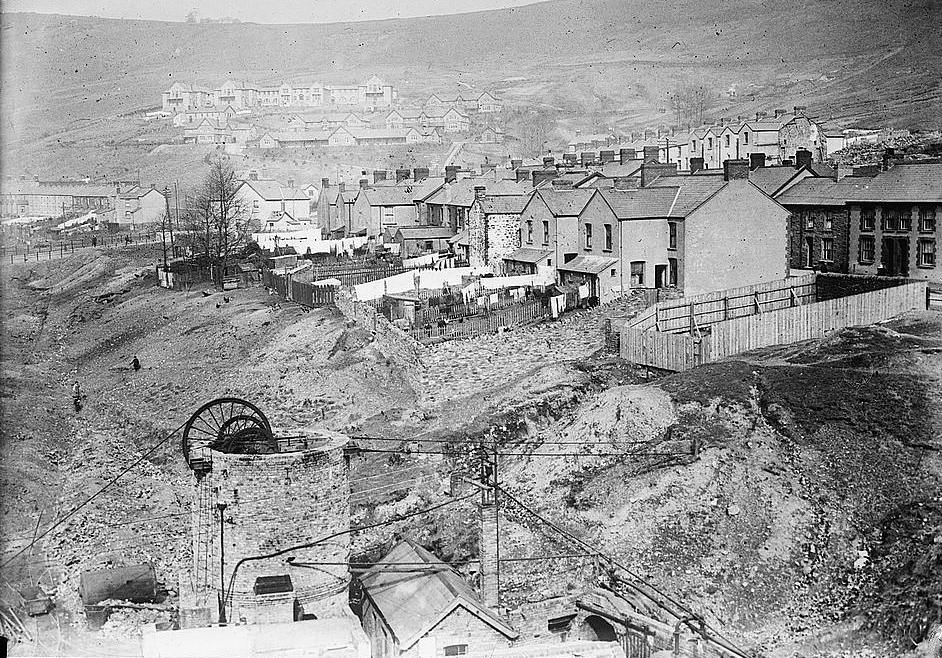
Llwynypia looking north towards Llwynypia Hospital, (c. 1912)

The South Wales coalfield is the largest continuous coalfield in Britain, extending some 113 kilometres (70 mi) from Pontypool in the east to St Brides Bay in the West, covering almost 2,600 square kilometres (1,000 sq mi). This took in most of Glamorgan and the entirety of the Rhondda within it. Although neighbouring areas such as Merthyr and Aberdare had already sunk coal mines, it was not until Walter Coffin initiated the Dinas Lower Colliery in 1812 that coal was exported from the Rhondda Valleys on any commercial scale. This was originally taken by packhorse, before the extension of Dr. Griffiths' private tramline, to Pontypridd and then by the Glamorganshire Canal to the port at Cardiff. The lack of transportation links was one of the main problems that curtailed exploitation of the Rhondda Valley coalfields, along with the belief that they lay too deep for economic working. It was therefore seen as an expensive risk. Exploration of the Rhondda was undertaken by the Bute Trustees, agents of the third Marquess of Bute, who not only owned large tracts of valley farmland but also possessed a large financial interest in the Cardiff Docks which would export the coal. The trustees sank the Bute Merthyr Colliery in October 1851, at the top of the Rhondda Fawr in what would become Treherbert. The Bute Merthyr began producing coal in 1855, as the first working steam-coal colliery in the Rhondda.

Along with the sinking of the first colliery at the head of the Rhondda, a second issue, transportation, was tackled with the extension of the Taff Vale Railway (TVR); royal assent was given in 1836. The original line was laid from Cardiff to Abercynon, and by 1841 a branch was opened to link Cardiff with Dinas via Pontypridd. This allowed easier transportation for Walter Coffin's Dinas mine, an unsurprising addition, as Coffin was a director of the TVR. In 1849 the TVR extended into the Rhondda Fach and, by 1856, the railway had reached the furthest areas of the Fach and Fawr valleys at Maerdy and Treherbert. For the first time, the Rhondda Valley was linked by a major transportation route to the rest of Wales and exploitation of its coalfields could begin.

The TVR line dominated coal transportation through the Rhondda's industrial history. Its monopoly was a bone of contention: the absence of rivals precluded colliery owners from negotiating lower haulage rates. Attempts were made to break the monopoly included the opening of the Rhondda and Swansea Bay Railway between 1885 and 1895, which linked Blaenrhondda at the head of the Rhondda Fawr to the Prince of Wales Dock. To achieve this the Rhondda Tunnel was dug through Mynydd Blaengwynfy to Blaengwynfi – at the time the longest railway tunnel in Wales.

Initially the shallower pits at Aberdare proved a bigger attraction to prospective mine owners, but once Aberdare became fully worked by the 1860s, the Rhondda saw rapid growth. During the 1860s and the 1870s, 20 Rhondda Valley collieries opened, with the leading owner in the Rhondda Fach being David Davis of Aberdare, and David Davies in the Rhondda Fawr. In 1865, the coal output from the Rhondda Valley was roughly one-quarter of that of Aberdare; ten years later the Rhondda was producing over two million tons more than the Aberdare valleys. These figures would later be dwarfed by massive excavation rates in the last quarter of the 19th century and up to the First World War. In 1913, Rhondda Valley output was 9.6 million tons.

By 1893, there were more than 75 collieries in the Rhondda Valleys. Initially most were owned by a small group of individuals, but the trend changed towards the start of the 20th century, as companies began buying up existing collieries. The widespread adoption of limited liability status began a trend towards concentration of ownership, reducing some of the economic risks involved in coal mining: unstable coal prices, inflated acquisitions, geological difficulties, and large-scale accidents. The emerging companies were formed by the individuals and families who sank the original collieries, but by the start of the 20th century they were no more than principal shareholders. The firms included the Davies's Ocean Coal Company, Archibald Hood's Glamorgan Coal Company and David Davis & Son.

=== Population growth in the industrial period ===
Year	Male	Female	Total
1801	265	277	542
1841	386	362	748
1851	493	458	951
1861	1669	1366	3035
1871	9559	7355	16914
1881	30877	24755	55632
1891	50174	38177	88351
1901	62315	51420	113735
1911	83209	69572	152781
1921	85351	77378	162729

During the early to mid-19th century, the Rhondda valleys were inhabited by small farming settlements. In 1841 the parish of Ystradyfodwg, which would later constitute most of the Rhondda Borough, recorded a population of less than a thousand. With the discovery of massive deposits of high quality, accessible coal in the mid-19th century, the valleys experienced a large influx of financial immigrants. The first came to the lower Rhondda villages of Dinas, Eirw and Cymmer. Special sinkers came from Llansamlet, while the first miners were from Penderyn, Cwmgwrach and neighbouring areas of Llantrisant and Llanharan. The 1851 Census lists apprenticed paupers from Temple Cloud in Somerset, some of the earliest English immigrants. From a mere 951 in 1851, the population of Ystradyfodwg parish grew to 16,914 in 1871. By 1901 the Rhondda Urban District had a population of 113,735. As more and more coal mines were sunk the population grew to fill the jobs needed to extract the coal. In the 1860s and 1870s the majority came from neighbouring Welsh counties, but with the improving rail transportation and cheaper transport, immigrants came from further afield. The 1890s recorded workers from the South West, places such as Gloucester and Devon, and by the 1900s people came from North Wales, the lead-mining area of Anglesey and the depressed slate-quarrying villages of Bethesda, Ffestiniog and Dinorwig. Although there are records of Scottish workers, mainly centred on Archibald Hood's Llwynypia mines, there were only small numbers of Irish, less than 1,000 by 1911. This absence is often blamed on the forcible ejection of the Irish who lived in Treherbert during three days of rioting in 1857. The population of the valleys peaked in 1924 at over 167,900 inhabitants.

The mass immigration in the period was almost entirely from other parts of Wales and from England. A notable exception was a group of Italian immigrants, originally from northern Italy round the town of Bardi. In the late 19th century, they were forced out of London by over-saturation of the market, and instead set up a network of cafés, ice cream parlours and fish & chip shops throughout South Wales. These became iconic landmarks in the villages they served and they and subsequent generations became Welsh Italians. Peculiar to the Rhondda was that shops run by Italian immigrants were known as bracchis, believed to have been named after Angelo Bracchi, who opened the first café there in the early 1890s. In the early 21st century several of the Rhondda's original bracchis were still open for business.

=== Decline of coal and economic emigration (1914–1944) ===
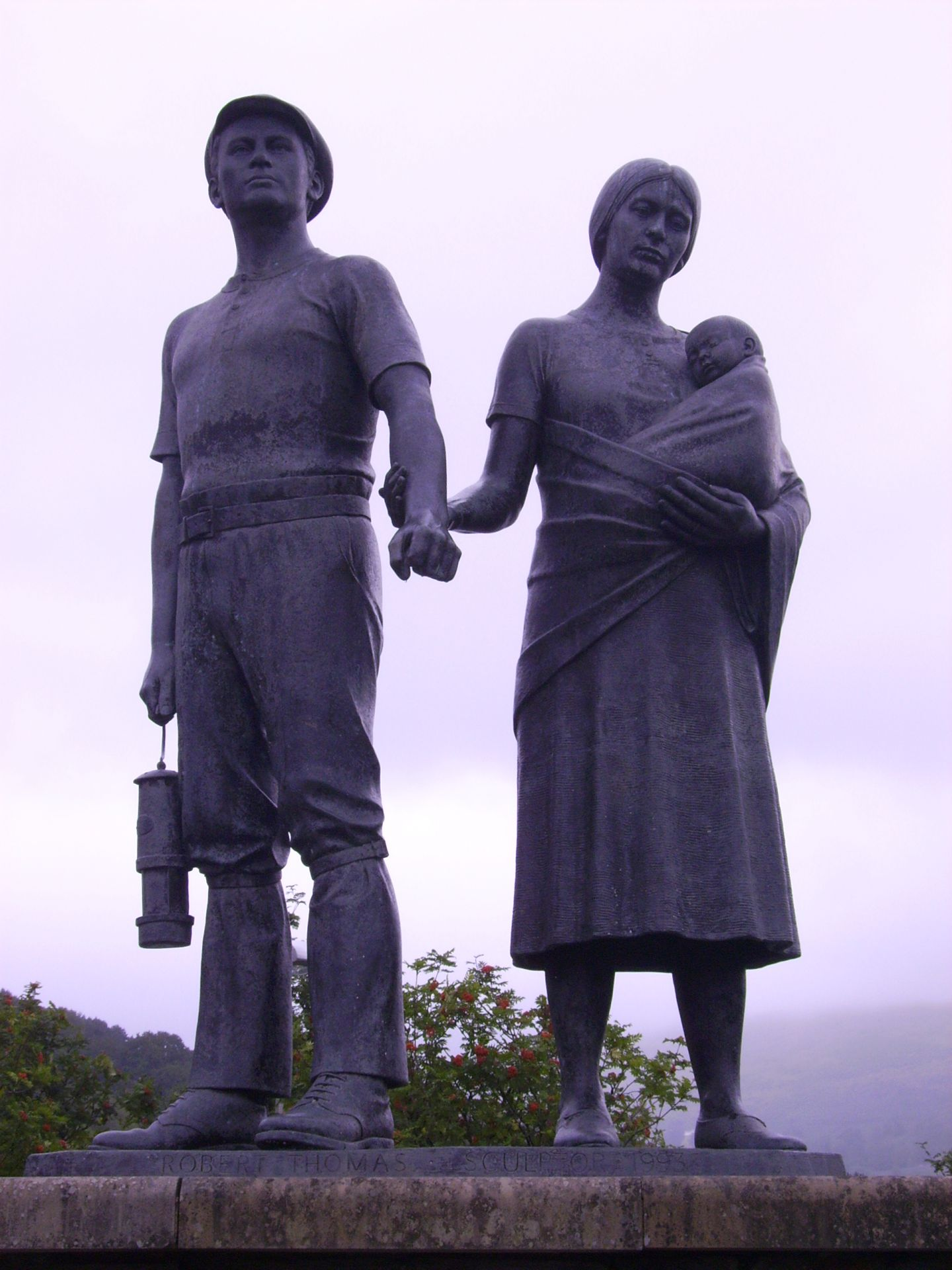
Commemorative statue to the "Mining Communities of Rhondda" Robert Thomas (1926–1999)

At the start of the First World War, the economic prospects in South Wales were good. Although production fell after the 1913 high, demand was still strong enough to push the coalfields to their limit. In February 1917 coal mining came under government control and demand increased as the war intensified, ensuring a market for sufficient supplies. After the war the picture began to change. Initially the British coal industry was buoyed by a series of fortuitous economic events, such as the American coal miners' strike, and by 1924 unemployment for miners was below the national average. But the belief that the mining industry would experience a permanent demand for coal was shattered by the Depression, when the Rhondda experienced a massive increase in unemployment. The situation worsened in 1926, when in response to coalowners reducing pay and lengthening working hours of miners, the TUC called a general strike in defence of the miners locked out following A. J. Cook's call "not a penny off the pay, not a minute on the day". The TUC called off the strike just nine days later, without resolving the miners' cut in wages. The miners disagreed and stayed on strike for a further seven months until they were starved into surrender. The Rhondda saw many schemes set up by miners to aid their plight, such as soup kitchens and fêtes and "joy" days to support them, while in Maerdy the local miners set up a rationing system. By the time the miners returned to work, there was little desire for further action, which saw a decline in the popularity of 'The Fed' and greater emphasis on solving problems by political and parliamentary means.

With the Great Depression, employment in the Rhondda Valleys continued to fall. This in turn led to a decline in public and social services, as people struggled to pay rates and rents. One outcome of the lack of funds was a fall in health provisions, which in Rhondda lead to a shortage of medical and nursing staff, a failure to provide adequate sewage works, and a rise in deaths from tuberculosis. By 1932 the long-term unemployment figure in the Rhondda was put at 63 per cent, and in Ferndale at almost 73 per cent.

With little other employment available in the Rhondda, the only solution appeared to be emigration. Between 1924 and 1939, 50,000 people left the Rhondda. During this time life was difficult for communities built solely around a singular industry, especially as most families were on a single wage.

The start of the Second World War saw a turnaround in the employment figures, and by 1944 unemployment figures in the Rhondda ranged from 1 per cent in Treorchy to 3.7 per cent at Tonypandy.

=== Mining disasters ===
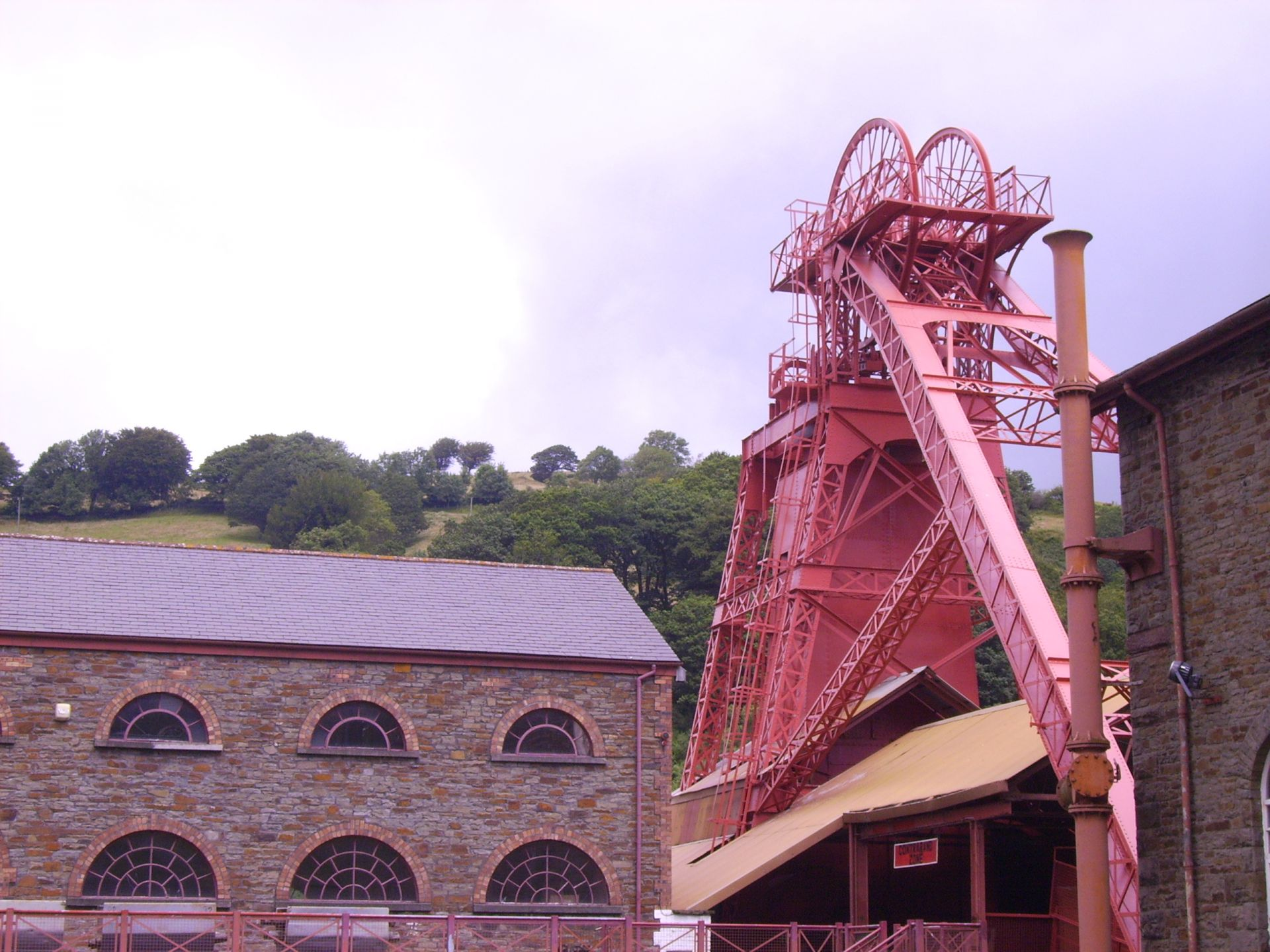
The Lewis Merthyr Colliery, now part of the Rhondda Heritage Park

The possibility of serious injury or death was an everyday risk for the mine workers of the Rhondda Valley. The most notorious form of colliery disaster was the gas explosion, caused by a buildup either of methane gas or coal dust. As mines became deeper and ventilation harder to control, the risk increased. The worst single incident in the Rhondda was the 1867 Ferndale disaster, when an explosion took 178 lives. However, the major disasters accounted for only about a fifth of the overall fatalities. The list below shows mining accidents involving the loss of five or more lives in a single incident.

Mining disasters in the Rhondda Valley 1850–1965
Colliery	Location	Date	Year	Death toll	Cause
Dinas Colliery	Dinas	1 January	1844	12	gas explosion
Cymmer Colliery	Cymmer	15 July	1856	114	gas explosion
Ferndale No. 1 Pit	Blaenllechau	8 November	1867	178	gas explosion
Ferndale No. 1 Pit	Blaenllechau	10 June	1869	53	gas explosion
Pentre Colliery	Pentre	24 February	1871	38	gas explosion
Tynewydd Colliery	Porth	11 April	1877	5	flooding
Dinas Middle Colliery	Dinas	13 January	1879	63	gas explosion
Naval Colliery	Penygraig	10 December	1880	101	gas explosion
Gelli Colliery	Gelli	21 August	1883	5	gas explosion
Naval Colliery	Penygraig	27 January	1884	14	gas explosion
Maerdy Colliery	Maerdy	23–24 December	1885	81	gas explosion
National Colliery	Wattstown	18 February	1887	39	gas explosion
Tylorstown Colliery	Tylorstown	27 January	1896	57	gas explosion
National Colliery	Wattstown	11 July	1905	120	gas explosion
Cambrian Colliery No.1	Clydach Vale	10 March	1905	34	gas explosion
Naval Colliery	Penygraig	27 August	1909	6	cage fall
Glamorgan Colliery	Llwynypia	25 January	1932	11	explosion, afterdamp
Blaenclydach Colliery	Clydach Vale	25 November	1941	7	runaway trolley
Lewis Merthyr Colliery	Trehafod	22 November	1956	9	gas explosion
Cambrian Colliery	Clydach Vale	17 May	1965	31	gas explosion

== Modern Rhondda 1945–present ==
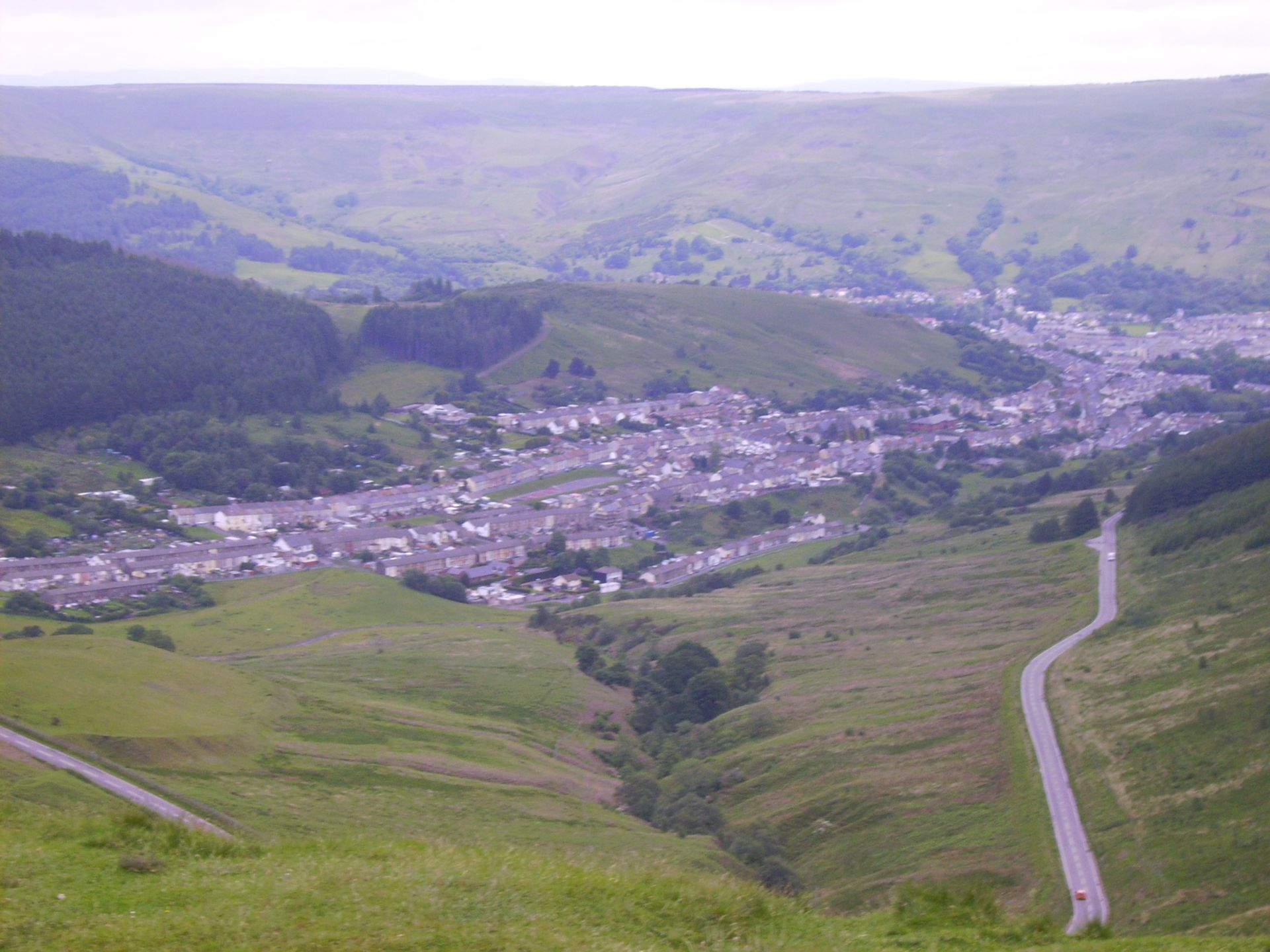
Cwmparc leading into Treorchy in the Rhondda Fawr

The coalmining industry of the Rhondda was artificially buoyed in the war years and there were expectations of a return to the pre-1939 industrial collapse after the end of the Second World War. There was a sense of salvation when the government announced the nationalisation of the British coal mines in 1947, but subsequent decades saw continual output reductions. From 15,000 miners in 1947, Rhondda had just a single pit within the valleys producing coal in 1984, located at Maerdy.

The decline in coal mining after World War II was a countrywide issue, but South Wales and Rhondda were more gravely affected than other areas. Oil had superseded coal as the fuel of choice in many industries and there was political pressure behind the oil supply. From the few industries still reliant on coal, the demand was for high quality, especially coking coal for the steel industry. By then, 50 per cent of Glamorgan coal was supplied to steelworks, with the second biggest market being domestic heating: the "smokeless" fuel of the Rhondda became once again fashionable after publication of the Clean Air Act 1956. These two markets controlled the fate of the mines in the Rhondda, and as demand fell from both, the effect was further contraction. In addition, exports to other areas of Europe such as France, Italy and the Low Countries experienced sharp decline: from 33 per cent of output around the start of the 20th century to some 5 per cent by 1980.

Other major factors in the decline of coal related to massive under-investment in the Rhondda mines over the previous decades. Most mines in the valleys had been sunk between the 1850s and 1880s, so that they were far smaller than most modern mines. The Rhondda mines were comparatively antiquated in their methods of ventilation, coal-preparation and power supply. In 1945, the British coal industry was cutting 72 per cent of its output mechanically, whereas in South Wales the figure was just 22 per cent. The only way to ensure financial survival of the mines in the valleys was massive investment by the NCB, but its "Plan for Coal" paper drawn up in 1950 was overly optimistic about future demand, which was drastically reduced after an industrial recession in 1956 and with increased availability of oil.

British and Welsh employment bodies funded and subsidised external businesses to locate replacement ventures in the valleys. The first attempt to bring in business unconnected to coal began in the 1920s, when David Jones, Town Clerk of the Rhondda Urban Council, gained government support for so doing. Arrivals included Alfred Polikoff's clothing factory, Messrs Jacob Beatus manufacturing cardboard boxes, and Electrical and Musical Industries Ltd. After the Second World War, 23 firms were set up in the Rhondda Valleys, 18 of them sponsored by the Board of Trade. Most had periods of growth followed by collapse, notably Thorn EMI in the 1970s and Burberry in the 2000s.

The Rhondda Heritage Park, a museum marking Rhondda's industrial past, lies just south of Porth in the former Lewis Merthyr Colliery at Trehafod.

== Governance ==
There is one tier of local government covering the Rhondda: Rhondda Cynon Taf County Borough Council. Although the Rhondda is divided into 16 communities, none of them have community councils.

=== Administrative history ===
Historically, Rhondda was mostly covered by the parish of Ystradyfodwg. The small village of Ystradyfodwg was centred on its parish church of St John the Baptist, with the old village being absorbed into the urban area of Ton Pentre as it grew during the industrial revolution. In 1877 most of the parish of Ystradyfodwg was made a local government district, governed by a local board, excluding only the Rhigos area of the parish, which lay to the north of the hills at the top of the Rhondda Fawr valley. The local government district was enlarged in 1879 to also cover parts of Llanwonno and Llantrisant parishes, which had the effect of bringing the Porth area within the Ystradyfodwg Local Government District.

In 1894 the local government district became the Ystradyfodwg Urban District and the parish boundaries were adjusted to match the urban district. The parish and urban district of Ystradyfodwg were both officially renamed Rhondda in 1897. Rhondda Urban District was made a municipal borough in 1955, and then reconstituted as a district within the new county of Mid Glamorgan in 1974. In 1996 Mid Glamorgan County Council was abolished and Rhondda merged with the neighbouring districts of Cynon Valley and Taff-Ely to become Rhondda Cynon Taf.

== Subdivisions and settlements ==
Rhondda Valleys
Map of the Rhondda valleys showing the main settlements. Blue markers represent Rhondda Fawr settlements, red markers represent Rhondda Fach settlements.

Rhondda is a conurbation of numerous smaller settlements along the valleys. The Royal Mail treats five of the settlements as post towns: Ferndale, Pentre, Porth, Tonypandy, and Treorchy, all of which come under the CF postcode area. The Office for National Statistics (ONS) deems most of the settlements in the Rhondda Fawr valley and lower Rhondda Fach valley to form part of the Tonypandy built-up area, with a population at the 2011 census of 62,545. The ONS separately defines a Ferndale built-up area covering much of the upper Rhondda Fach valley, with a population in 2011 of 7,338.

Until 1984, Rhondda constituted a single community. In 1984 it was divided into 16 communities:

Community	Population (2011 census)	Post town
Cwm Clydach	2,799	Tonypandy
Cymmer	4,807	Porth
Ferndale	4,178	Ferndale
Llwyn-y-pia	2,247	Tonypandy
Maerdy	3,160	Ferndale
Pentre	5,232	Pentre
Pen-y-graig	5,554	Tonypandy
Porth	5,970	Porth
Tonypandy	3,750	Tonypandy
Trealaw	4,040	Tonypandy
Trehafod	698	Pontypridd
Treherbert	5,727	Treorchy
Treorchy	7,694	Treorchy
Tylorstown	4,546	Ferndale
Ynyshir	3,320	Porth
Ystrad	5,854	Pentre

=== Rhondda Fawr ===
The larger of the two valleys, the Rhondda Fawr, extends from Porth and rises through the valley up to Blaenrhondda, near Treherbert. The settlements making up the Rhondda Fawr are:

- Blaencwm, a district of Treherbert
- Blaenrhondda, a district of Treherbert
- Cwm Clydach, a community
- Cwmparc, a district of Treorchy
- Cymmer, a district of Porth
- Dinas Rhondda, a district of Penygraig
- Edmondstown, a district of Penygraig
- Gelli, a district of Ystrad
- Glynfach, a district of Cymmer
- Llwynypia, a community
- Pentre, a community
- Penygraig, a community
- Penyrenglyn, a district of Treherbert between Treherbert and Ynyswen
- Porth, a community at the confluence of the Fawr and Fach branches of the river
- Ton Pentre, a district of Pentre
- Tonypandy, a community
- Trealaw, a community
- Trebanog, a district of Cymmer
- Trehafod, the southernmost and smallest of the Rhondda Valley communities
- Treherbert, a community
- Treorchy, the largest community in either of the valleys
- Tynewydd, a district of Treherbert
- Williamstown, a district of Penygraig
- Ynyswen, a district of Treorchy
- Ystrad, a community

=== Rhondda Fach ===
The Rhondda Fach is celebrated in the 1971 David Alexander song "If I could see the Rhondda"; the valley includes Wattstown, Ynyshir, Pontygwaith, Ferndale, Tylorstown and Maerdy. The settlements that make up the Rhondda Fach are as follows:

- Blaenllechau, a district of Ferndale
- Ferndale, a community
- Maerdy, a community
- Penrhys, a district of Tylorstown
- Pontygwaith, a district of Tylorstown
- Tylorstown, a community
- Stanleytown, a district of Tylorstown
- Wattstown, a district of Ynyshir
- Ynyshir, a community

== Religion ==
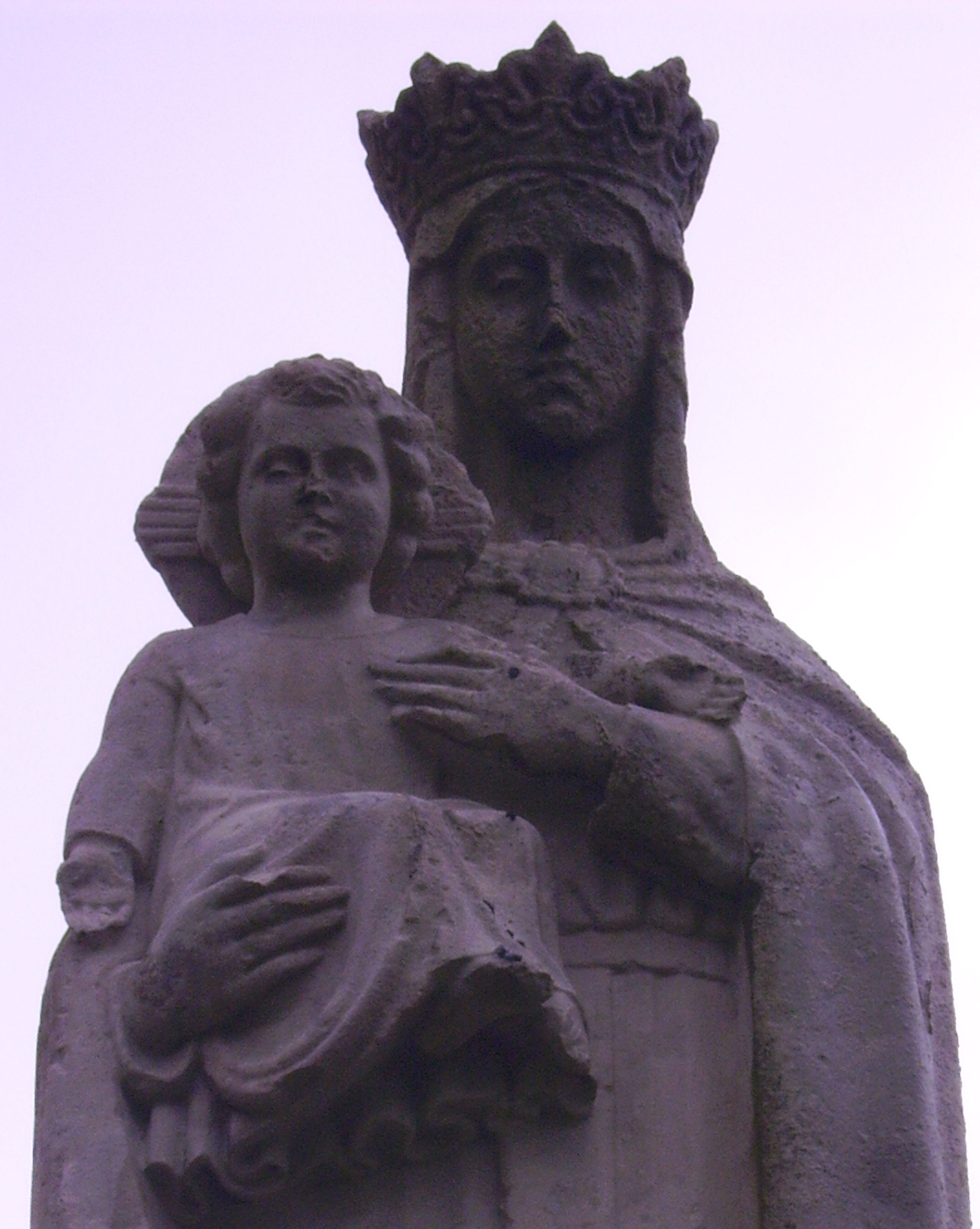
Statue to "Our Lady", the pilgrimage site at Penrhys

The commote of Glynrhondda was coterminous with the earlier parish of Ystradyfodwg, but little is known of the Celtic saint Tyfodwg, or Dyfodwg, after whom the parish is named. He is thought to have lived around AD 600. Although the parish bears his name, there are now no religious monuments or places of worship named after him within the Rhondda boundaries, although two churches outside the area are named after him: Y Tre Sant in Llantrisant and Saint Tyfodwg's in Ogmore Vale.

The earliest known religious monument is the Catholic Ffynnon Fair well in Penrhys first mentioned in the 15th century, though it may have been a place of pagan worship before. This pilgrimage site was identified as a manor belonging to the Cistercian Abbey of Llantarnam and was seen as one of the most important religious sites in Wales, due to its Marian shrine. This site was the main reason people would pass through the commote; it was even thought to be the main reason the first bridges were built over the River Rhondda.

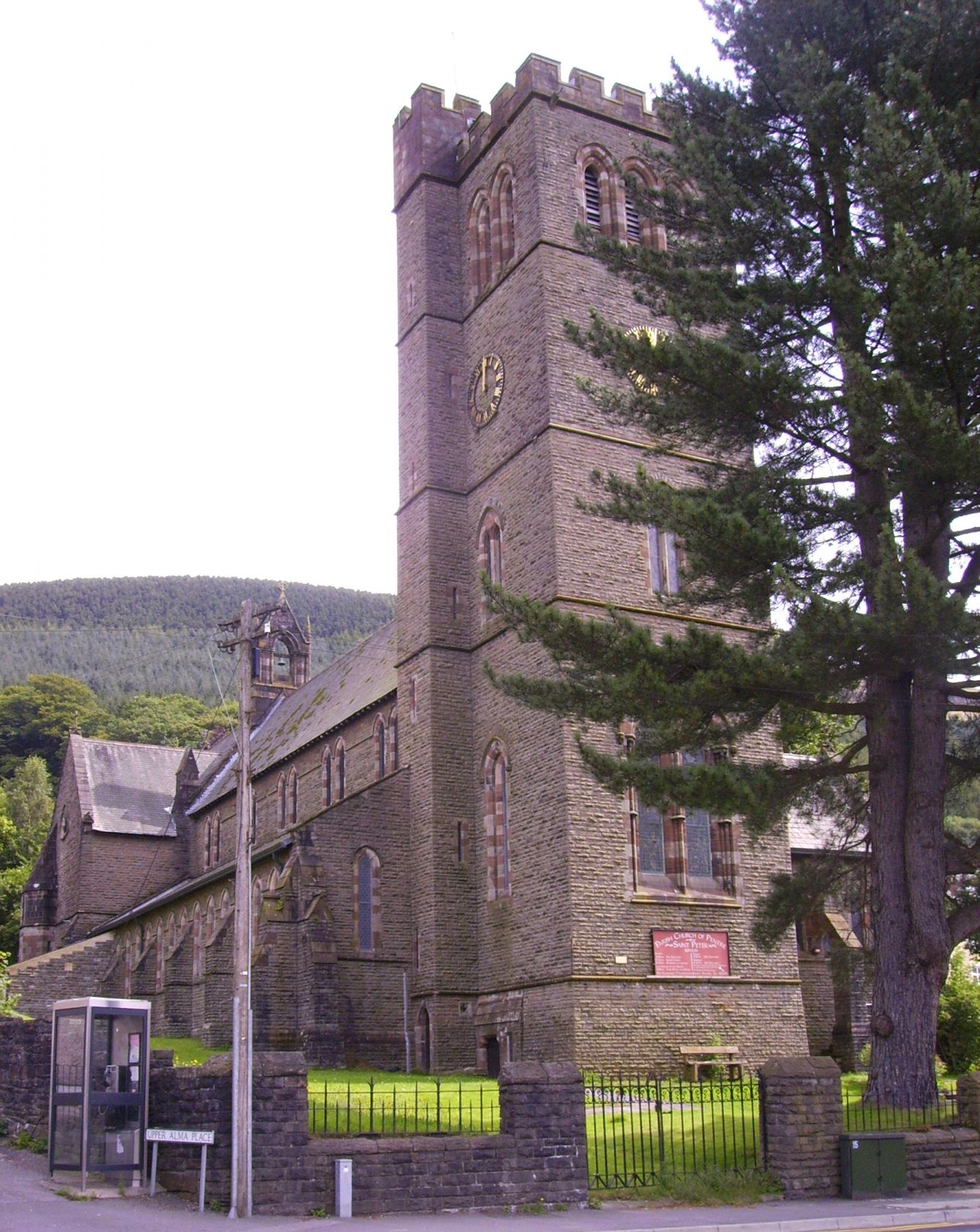
St Peter's Church, Pentre, 'The Cathedral of the Rhondda'

During the Middle Ages, the parish church of Ystradyfodwg near the bank of the River Rhondda served the parishioners of the Rhondda Fawr, while the families of the Rhondda Fach attended Llanwynno Church. The inhabitants of the lower Rhondda, in the vicinity of Porth and Dinas, needed to reach Llantrisant to hear a service.

Despite the importance of the Anglican Church to parishioners, the growing strength of Nonconformity made itself felt in the 18th century. In 1738 the Reverend Henry Davies formed the Independent Cause in Cymmer and five years later a Tŷ Cwrdd or meeting house was opened there. Although attracting families from as far away as Merthyr and the parish of Eglwysilan, there were no other Nonconformist Causes until David Williams began preaching in the Rhondda in 1784. In 1785 six people were baptised in the river near Melin-yr-Om and in 1786 Ynysfach was opened in Ystrad as "a new house for religious services". This was the first Baptist chapel in the Rhondda and later became known as Nebo, Ystrad Rhondda. Cymmer and Ynysfach chapel would be the forerunners in a new religious movement in the valley for the next 150 years. In the early 19th century there were only three places of worship in the Rhondda; the parish church (now dedicated to St John the Baptist) and the Cymmer and Ynysfach chapels. This changed rapidly after 1855 as coalmining brought an influx of population, and by 1905 there were 151 chapels in the valley.

Chapel life was central to valley life throughout the late 19th and early 20th centuries, but as with many communities throughout Britain, the post-war periods saw a decline in regular membership. To an extent the number of places of worship declined with the population, but this was exacerbated in the Rhondda by a swift decline in the number of Welsh speakers. Welsh-language chapels in particular saw a sharp drop in membership from the 1950s, and many closed in the next half-century. By 1990 the Rhondda had less than 50 places of worship and many premises had been demolished.

== Political activism ==
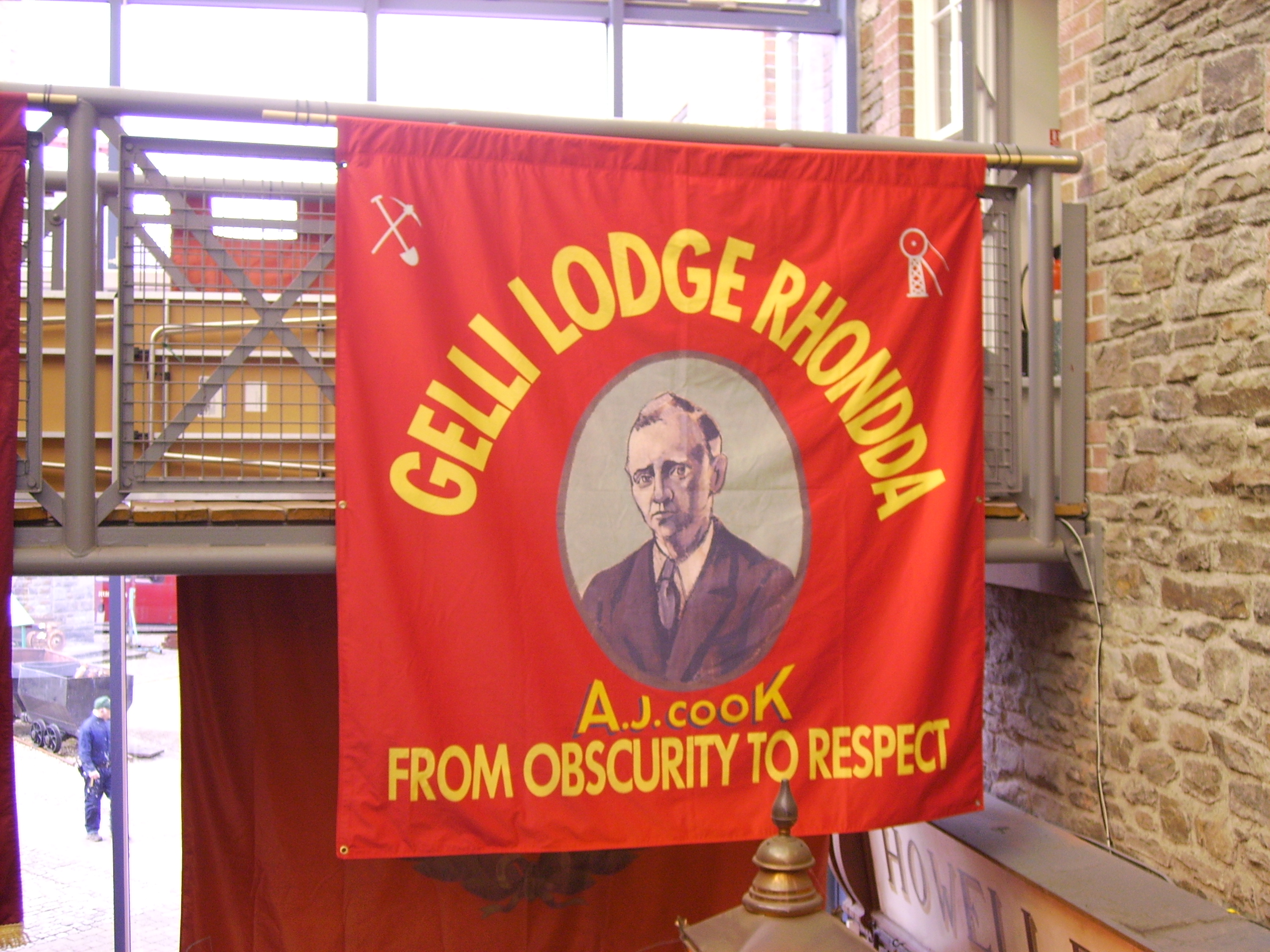
Lodge banner depicting Unionist A.J. Cook

Political activism in the Rhondda has deep links with trade unions and the socialist movement, but was initially slow to develop. In the 1870s the Amalgamated Association of Miners won support, but was destroyed by employer hostility. The Cambrian Miners' Association was more successful and the creation of the South Wales Miners' Federation after the 1898 coal strike gave South Wales miners a reputation for militancy, in which the Rhondda Valley played its part.

As part of the Redistribution of Seats Act 1885 the Rhondda was granted its first seat in Parliament, which was won by a moderate trade union leader, William Abraham, who was notably the only working-class member elected in Wales. Socialism and syndicalism grew in the 20th century and industrial struggle reached a crescendo in the 1910–1911 Tonypandy riots. A year later Tonypandy saw the publication of Noah Ablett's pamphlet "The Miners' Next Step". Tonypandy was at the centre of further public disorder, when on 11 June 1936 at Dewinton Field, a crowd gathered to confront an open-air address by Tommy Moran, propaganda officer of the British Union of Fascists. The crowd, recorded as 2,000–6,000 strong, turned violent and police had to protect Moran's Blackshirt bodyguard. Seven local people were arrested.

The Rhondda also has a strong history of communist sympathy, with the Rhondda Socialist Society being a key element in the coalition that founded the Communist Party of Great Britain. By 1936 there were seven communists on Rhondda Urban District Council and the branch was publishing its own newspaper The Vanguard. In the 1930s Maerdy became such a hotspot of communist support known as "Little Moscow" producing left-wing activists such as Merthyr born Arthur Horner and Marxist writer Lewis Jones. The Rhondda miners were also active in socialist activities outside the valleys. In the 1920s and 1930s the Rhondda and the surrounding valleys provided the principal support of some of the largest hunger marches, while in 1936 more Rhondda Federation members were serving in Spain as part of the International Brigades than the total number of volunteers from all the English coalfields.

In 1979, Rhondda councillor Annie Powell became Wales' only communist mayor.

== Culture and recreation ==
=== Role of women ===
With an economy largely dependent on a single industry, there was a scarcity of paid jobs for women in Rhondda's coalmining heyday. The Encyclopaedia of Wales notes that the image of the Welsh Mam, a wife and mother constantly at home and exalted as the queen of the household, was essentially a Rhondda creation. However the Rhondda did produce the suffragette and social reformer Elizabeth Andrews, one of nine women among a list of a hundred great Welsh heroes chosen by ballot in 2004.

=== Sport ===
Social amenities were rudimentary even before the Rhondda Urban District Council was formed in 1897. Due to the geographic layout of the valleys, land was a scarce resource, and so leisure pursuits that took up little space, time and money were sought. This resulted in activities such as greyhound racing, cockfighting, open-air handball (often attached to a public house), boxing, foot racing and rugby union.

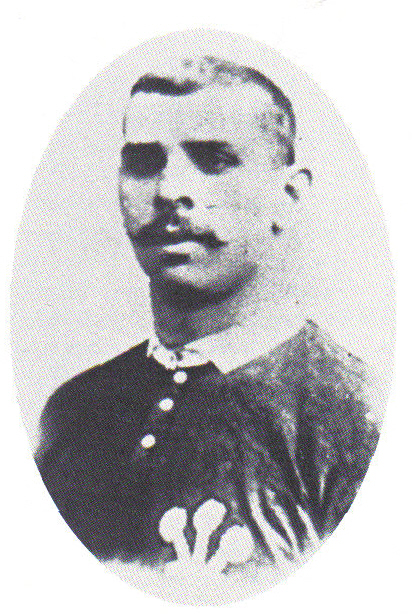
Dai 'Tarw' Jones

==== Rugby union ====
During the mid-19th century the influx of immigrants from older mining towns such as Aberdare and Merthyr brought the game of rugby with them. At Treherbert it took a five-month lockout in 1875 to see the game establish itself at the various collieries where the Amalgamated Association of Miners held their meetings. In 1877 Penygraig Rugby Football Club was formed, followed by Treherbert in 1879, Ferndale in 1882, Ystrad Rhondda in 1884, Treorchy in 1886 and Tylorstown in 1903. In the late 19th and early 20th century, the "Rhondda forward" was a key player in many Wales teams. The heavy industrial worker was a prime aggressive attack figure in early Welsh packs, typified by the likes of Treherbert's Dai 'Tarw' (bull) Jones who at 6-foot 1 inch (185.5 cm) and 16 stone (100 kg) in weight was seen as an animal of a man.

The lack of playing fields in the valleys meant many rugby teams shared grounds, travelled every week to away grounds, or even played on inappropriate sloping pitches. The valley clubs had no clubhouses, with most teams meeting and changing in the closest local public house. Many clubs built around colliery and pub teams appeared and disbanded, but many others survive to this day.

==== Football ====
Due to the dominance of rugby union, there have been few football teams of note in the history of the Rhondda Valleys. Several teams were formed around the end of the 19th century, but most folded in the Depression, including Cwmparc F.C. in 1926 and Mid-Rhondda in 1928. The area's most successful club is Ton Pentre F.C.

==== Netball ====
Netball has become increasingly popular in the Rhondda during the 21st century. A local charity, Rhondda Netball, encourages more women to take part in sports both inside and outside school.

=== Music ===
The temperance movement, absorbed into the moralistic system of the Nonconformist chapels, caused a shift in social attitudes in the mid to late-19th and early 20th century Rhondda. Alcohol was looked down on and so were the increasingly violent sports such as rugby, so that many young men sought more acceptable pastimes. Voice choirs were a natural progression from chapel society and brass bands eventually gained acceptance by the movement.

==== Male voice choirs ====
The male-voice choirs of Welsh industrial communities are believed to have derived from glee clubs. The Rhondda produced several choirs of note, including the Rhondda Glee Society, which represented Wales at the World Fair eisteddfod. The rival Treorchy Male Voice Choir also enjoyed success at eisteddfodau, and in 1895, the original choir sang before Queen Victoria. Many choirs still exist, including the Cambrian Male voice choir in Tonypandy and the Cor Meibion Morlais in Ferndale.

==== Brass bands ====
The mid-19th century brass bands had a poor relationship with the Nonconformist chapels, mainly due to the heavy social drinking that came hand in hand with being a member. This changed towards the end of the 19th century, when on becoming more respectable, many bands had actually joined the temperance movement. Two Rhondda brass bands which both started as temperance bands are the Cory Band from Ton Pentre, who started life as Ton Temperance in 1884; and the Parc and Dare Band, formerly the Cwmparc Drum and Fife Temperance Band. The oldest in Rhondda is the Lewis-Merthyr Band, formerly Cymmer Colliery Band, founded as the Cymmer Military Band in or before 1855.

As the temperance movement faded, the bands found new benefactors in the colliery owners and many took on the names of specific collieries. A memorable image of the connection between the collieries and brass bands came in 1985, when the Maerdy miners were filmed returning to work after the miners' strike, marching behind the village band.

==== Songs ====
Tom Jones, David Alexander and Paul Child have been among those who sang songs about the Rhondda as has Max Boyce who was born in Treorchy, Rhondda.

Rhondda is mentioned in the folk song The Bells of Rhymney: "Who made the mine owner?" say the black bells of Rhondda, quoting poetry from Idris Davies.

=== Culture and nationality ===
==== Language ====
For most of its history, the Rhondda valleys were an exclusively Welsh-speaking area. Only in the early 20th century did English began to supplant Welsh as the first language of social intercourse. In 1803, English historian Benjamin Heath Malkin mentioned that while travelling through Ystradyfodwg he had met only one person with whom he could talk, and then with the help of an interpreter. This experience was repeated by John George Wood, who on a visit complained of the awkwardness of understanding the particular dialects and idioms used by the native speakers, which were difficult for other Welsh speakers to understand. This dialect was once called tafodiaith gwŷr y Gloran (the dialect of Gloran men).

As industrialisation began, there was still little shift in the use of Welsh. Initial immigrants were Welsh: it was not until the 1900s that English workers began settling in any great numbers, and in any case it was not these new workers who changed the language. The erosion of Welsh had begun in the 1860s in the school classrooms. The educational philosophy accepted by schoolmasters and governmental administrators was that English was the language of scholars and Welsh a barrier to moral and commercial prosperity. In 1901, 35.4 per cent of Rhondda workers spoke only English, but by 1911 this had risen to 43.1 per cent, while Welsh-speaking monoglots had fallen from 11.4 to 4.4 per cent in the same period.

Thorough anglicization of the Rhondda Valleys took place between 1900 and 1950. Improved transport and communications facilitated the spread of cultural influences, along with dealings with outside companies with no understanding of Welsh, trade union meetings being held in English, and the coming of radio, cinema and then television and cheap English newspapers and paperback books. All these were factors in the absorption of the English language.

==== Cadwgan Circle ====
Though the population of the Rhondda was embracing English as its first language, a literary and intellectual movement formed in the Rhondda in the 1940s that would produce an influential group of Welsh language writers. The group formed during the Second World War by Egyptologist J. Gwyn Griffiths and his German wife Käthe Bosse-Griffiths was known as the Cadwgan Circle (Cylch Cadwgan) and met at the Griffiths' house in Pentre. Welsh writers who made up the movement included Pennar Davies, Rhydwen Williams, James Kitchener Davies and Gareth Alban Davies.

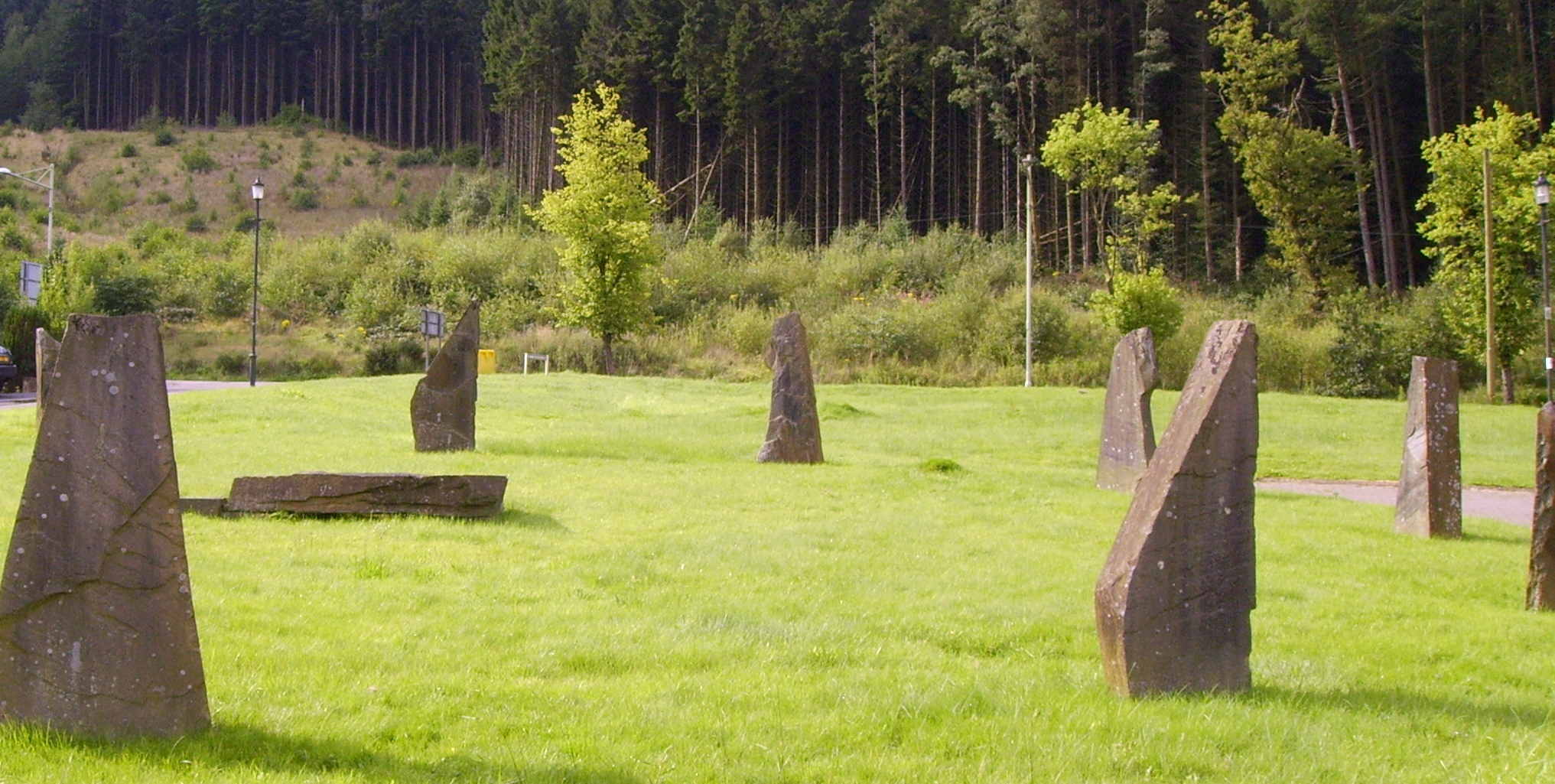
Treorchy Gorsedd Stones

==== National Eisteddfod ====
The Rhondda has hosted the National Eisteddfod on 2 occasions, in 1928 at Treorchy and in 2024 in Pontypridd. The Gorsedd stones that were placed to mark the 1928 event still stand on the Maindy hillside overlooking Treorchy and Cwmparc. In 1947 Treorchy held the Urdd National Eisteddfod for children and young adults.

==== Communal activity ====
Rhondda had a strong tradition of communal activity, exemplified by workmen's halls, miners' institutes and trade unions. Miners began to contribute to the building and running of institutes – such as the Parc and Dare Hall in Treorchy – from the 1890s onwards, and were centres of entertainment and self-improvement, with billiards halls, libraries and reading rooms.

=== Media ===
In 1884 the Rhondda Valley had a local newspaper, the Rhondda Chronicle, which became the Rhondda Gazette and General Advertiser of the Rhondda Fach and Ogmore Valleys in 1891. In 1899, the Rhondda Valley was served by the Pontypridd and Rhondda Weekly Post while the Rhondda Post was also in circulation in 1898.

The Rhondda Leader, one of the more familiar local papers, appeared in 1899 and nine years later became the Rhondda Leader, Maesteg, Garw and Ogmore Telegraph. The Porth Gazette was published from 1900 to 1944, and during that period there was a newspaper called the Rhondda Socialist. The Rhondda Gazette was in circulation from 1913 to 1919, while the Rhondda Clarion was available in the late 1930s.

The Porth Gazette and Rhondda Leader was published from 1944 to 1967. Also published in Pontypridd during that period was the Rhondda Fach Leader and Gazette. In more recent years the Rhondda Leader and Pontypridd & Llantrisant Observer combined, before the Rhondda Leader became separate once more.

In August 1952 the BBC transmitter at Wenvoe began broadcasting, allowing the Rhondda to receive television pictures for the first time. This was followed in January 1958 by commercial television from Television Wales and the West (TWW), giving Rhondda viewers a choice of two channels.

== Transport ==
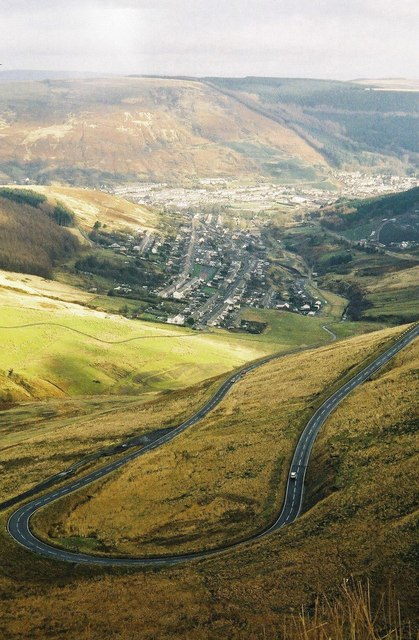
The A4061 Bwlch-y-Clawdd road was built in 1928. It connected the Rhondda to Nantymoel and Abergwynfi and made a lasting impression on the landscape to be featured in National Geographic.

The geological layout of the Rhondda Valley has led to restrictive transport links. The original road layout followed the valleys, with few links between them. In the 1920s, a major unemployment relief programme for out-of-work miners was created to build mountain roads connecting them. These had a lasting effect and transformed the valleys from being dead-end communities. In the late 20th and early 21st centuries, new road projects such as the Rhondda by-pass were created out of former railway lines.

Two main roads service the area. The A4058 runs through the Rhondda Fawr and the A4233 services the Rhondda Fach. The A4058 starts at Pontypridd runs through Porth before ending at Treorchy, where it joins the A4061 to Hirwaun. The A4233 begins outside Rhondda at Tonyrefail, heading north through Porth and through the Rhondda Fach to Maerdy, where the road links up with the A4059 at Aberdare. Two other A roads service the area; the A4119 is a relief road known as the Tonypandy Bypass; the other is the A4061, which links Treorchy to the Ogmore Vale before reaching Bridgend.

There is a single rail link to the Rhondda, the Rhondda Line, based around the old Taff Vale Railway, which serviced both the Rhondda Fach and Rhondda Fawr. The Rhondda Line runs through the Rhondda Fawr, linking Rhondda to Cardiff Central. The railway stations that once populated the Rhondda Fach were all closed under the Beeching Axe. The railway line serves 10 Rhondda stations at villages not directly linked connected through bus services.

British Rail reopened some of the closed stations, such as Ystrad Rhondda in 1986.

== Notable people ==
Due to the scarcity of inhabitants in the Rhondda prior to industrialisation, there are few residents of note before the valleys became a coal-mining area. The earliest individuals to come to the fore were linked with the coal industry and the people; physical men who found a way out of the Rhondda through sport, and charismatic orators who led the miners through unions or political and religious leaders who tended to the deeply religious chapel going public.

=== Sport ===
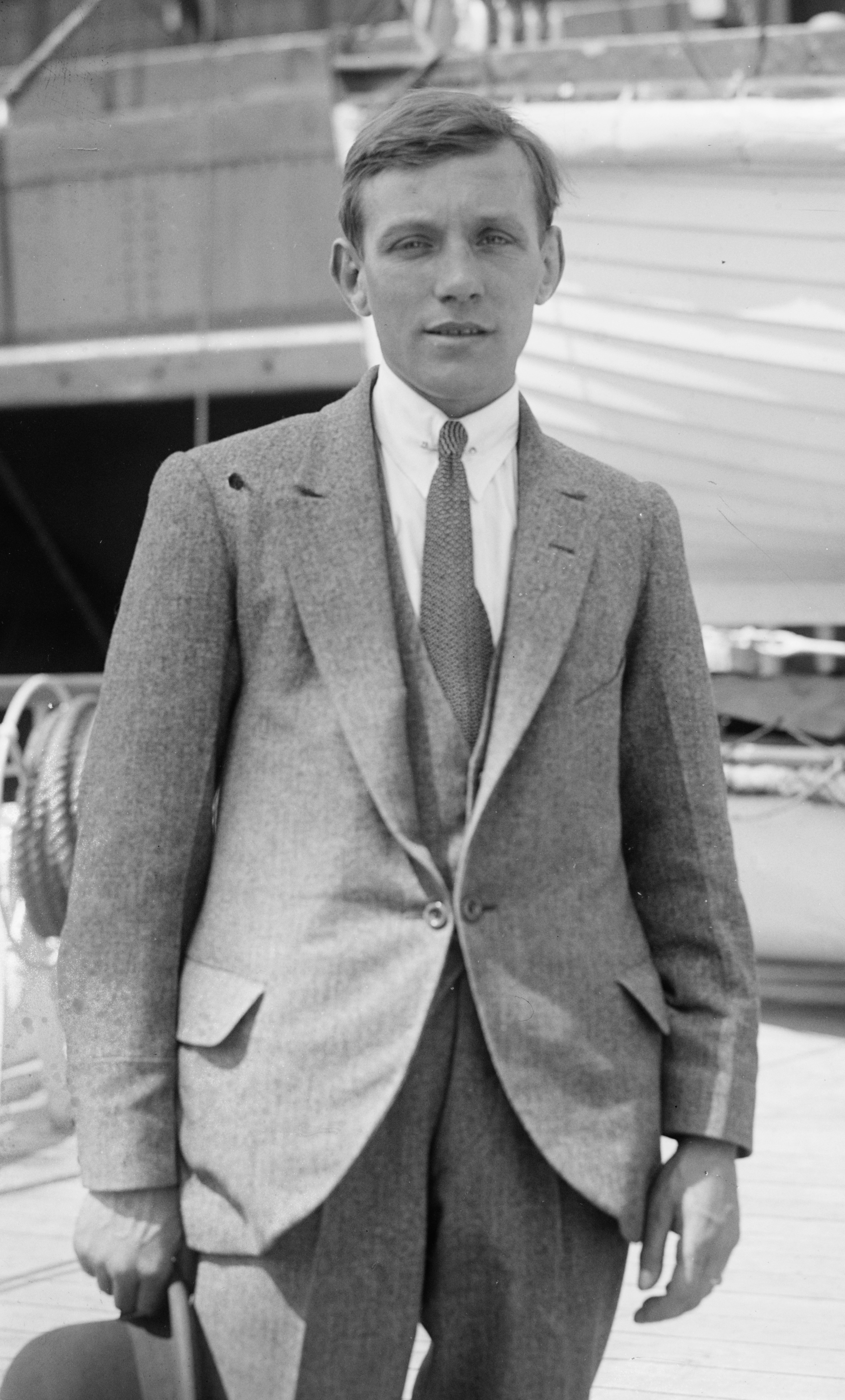
Boxer, Jimmy Wilde

The two main sports with which the Rhondda appeared to produce quality participants were rugby union and boxing. One of the first true rugby stars to come from the Rhondda was Willie Llewellyn, who not only gained 20 caps for Wales scoring 48 points but was also the first Rhondda-born member of the British Lions. Such was Llewellyn's fame that during the Tonypandy riots, his pharmacy was left unscathed by the crowds due to his past sporting duties. Many players came through the Rhondda to gain international duty, and after the split between amateur rugby union and the professional Northern League, many were also tempted to the North of England to earn a wage for their abilities. Amongst the new league players was Jack Rhapps, Aberaman-born, but living in the Rhondda when he went north, to become the world's first dual-code international rugby player.

The most famous rugby player from the Rhondda in the latter half of the 20th century is Cliff Morgan. Morgan was born in Trebanog and gained 29 caps for Wales, four for the British Lions and was one of the inaugural inductees of the International Rugby Hall of Fame. Another notable player is Billy Cleaver from Treorchy, a member of the 1950 Grand Slam winning team. Maurice Richards, born in Tynntyla Road, Ystrad Rhondda, was a Welsh international and British Lion of note, still known today for his scoring achievements playing in this code.

During the 20th century the Rhondda supplied a steady stream of championship boxers. Percy Jones was not only the first World Champion from the Rhondda, but the first Welshman to hold a World Title when he won the Flyweight belt in 1914. After Jones came the Rhondda's most notable boxer, Jimmy Wilde, also known as the "Mighty Atom", who took the IBU world flyweight title in 1916. British Champions from the valleys include Tommy Farr, who held the British and Empire heavyweight belt, and Llew Edwards, who took the British featherweight and Australian lightweight titles.

Although association football was not so popular as rugby in the Rhondda in the early 20th century, after the 1920s several notable players emerged from the area. Two of the most important came from the village of Ton Pentre; Jimmy Murphy was capped 15 times for Wales, and in 1958 managed both the Welsh national team and Manchester United. Roy Paul, also from Ton Pentre, led Manchester City to two successive FA Cup finals in 1955 and 1956 and gained 33 Welsh caps. Alan Curtis, who was best known for representing Swansea City and Cardiff City, came from the neighbouring village of Pentre, and in an 11-year international career won 35 caps for Wales, scoring six goals.

The Rhondda Valleys have produced two world-class darts players. In 1975 Alan Evans from Ferndale won the Winmau World Masters, a feat repeated in 1994 by Richie Burnett from Cwmparc. Burnett surpassed Evans when he also became BDO World Darts Champion, winning the tournament in 1995.

=== Politics ===
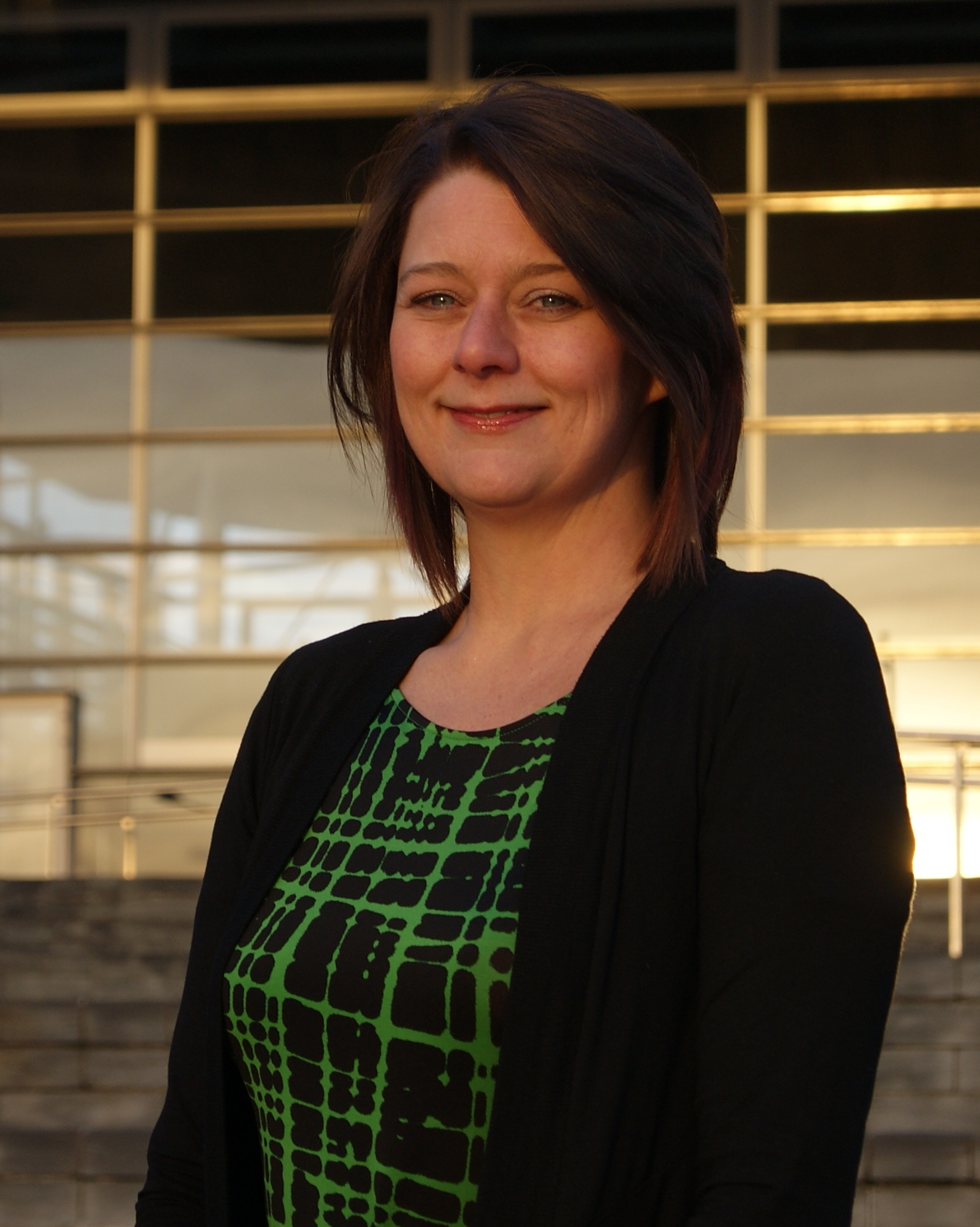
Leanne Wood, from Penygraig

D. A. Thomas, active in the area as an industrialist and Liberal politician, received the titles of Baron Rhondda in 1916 and Viscount Rhondda in 1918. Despite not being born in the Rhondda, the two most notable political figures to emerge from the area are William Abraham, known as Mabon, and George Thomas, Viscount Tonypandy. Abraham, best known as a trade unionist, was the first Member of Parliament of the Rhondda and the leader of the South Wales Miners' Federation. A strong negotiator in the early years of valley unionism, he lost ground as a moderate to more radical leaders in his later years. Thomas was born in Port Talbot, but raised in Trealaw near Tonypandy. He was a Member of Parliament for Cardiff for 38 years and Speaker of the House of Commons (1976–1983). On his retirement from politics, he received the title of Viscount Tonypandy.

Leanne Wood, the former leader of Plaid Cymru, was born in the Rhondda.

=== Film and television ===
The best-known actors born in the Rhondda have been Sir Stanley Baker and the brothers Donald and Glyn Houston. Baker was born in Ferndale and starred in films such as The Cruel Sea (1953) and Richard III (1955), though it was as actor/producer of the 1964 film Zulu that his legacy endures. The Houston brothers were born in Tonypandy, with Donald gaining the greater success as a film actor, with memorable roles in The Blue Lagoon (1949) and Ealing's Dance Hall (1950). Glyn Houston acted primarily in British B-Movies and was better known as a television actor. Actor and comedian Paul Whitehouse is from the Rhondda Valley.

=== Literature ===
Of the Cadwgan Circle, the most notable is Rhydwen Williams, winner of the Eisteddfod Crown on two occasions, who used the landscape of the industrial valleys as a basis for much of his work. Writing in English, Peter George was born in Treorchy and is best known as the Oscar-nominated screenwriter of Dr. Strangelove, based on his book Red Alert. Reflecting the lives of the residents of the Rhondda, both Gwyn Thomas and Ron Berry brought a realism to the industrial valleys missing in the more rose-tinted writings of Richard Llewellyn.

=== Visual arts ===
The area has not produced as notable a group of visual artists as it has writers, though in the 1950s a small group of students, brought together through a daily commute by train to the Cardiff College of Art, came to prominence as the Rhondda Group. Although it did not set up a school or have a manifesto, the group, which included Charles Burton, Ceri Barclay, Glyn Morgan, Thomas Hughes, Gwyn Evans, Nigel Flower, David Mainwaring, Ernest Zobole and Robert Thomas, formed an important artistic movement in 20th-century Welsh art.

The notable members of the group include Ernest Zobole, a painter from Ystrad, whose expressionist work was deeply rooted in the juxtaposition of the industrialised buildings of the valleys against the green hills that surround them. Also from the Rhondda Fawr was the sculptor Robert Thomas; born in Cwmparc, his heavy-cast statues have become icons of contemporary Wales, with many of his works publicly displayed in Cardiff.

=== Science and social science ===
In sciences and social sciences, the Rhondda has provided important academics for Wales and on the world stage. Donald Davies, born in Treorchy in 1924, was the co-inventor of packet switching, a process enabling the exchange of information between computers, a feature which enabled the Internet.

In the social sciences, the Rhondda has produced the historian John Davies, an important voice on Welsh affairs, who was one of the most recognised faces and voices of 21st-century Welsh history, and was one of the main authors of The Welsh Academy Encyclopaedia of Wales. The Rhondda has also produced J. Gwyn Griffiths, an eminent Egyptologist, who was also a member of the Cadwgan Circle. Griffiths and his wife Käthe Bosse-Griffiths were influential writers and curators in the history of Egyptian lore. It is where a cluster of three internationally distinguished social geographers spent their early lives: Michael Dear; David Hebert; and Kelvyn Jones. All three are Fellows of the Learned Society of Wales. The noted political philosopher Brad Evans, who has written many books on violence and global affairs, was also born in the valleys of South Wales. His semi-biographical book How Black was my Valley provides a peoples history of the valleys with a particular focus on the problems blighting its towns. The book offers a reworking of Richard Llewellyn's How Green was my Valley as it documents the change in the regions landscape from black back to green. As the book rephrases from Llewellyn's text, “How black was my valley, and the valley of them that are gone”.

== Bibliography ==
- Altschul, Michael (1971). "Glamorgan and Morgannwg under the Rule of the De Clare family". In Pugh, T. B. (ed.). Glamorgan County History. Vol. III: The Middle Ages. Cardiff: University of Wales Press. OCLC 4121242.
- Awdry, Christopher (1990). Encyclopaedia of British Railway Companies. Sparkford: Patrick Stephens Ltd. ISBN 1-8526-0049-7. OCLC 19514063. CN 8983.
- Carpenter, David J. (2000). Rhondda Collieries. Stroud, Gloucestershire: Tempus Publishing. ISBN 0-7524-1730-4.
- Davies, John; Jenkins, Nigel (2008). The Welsh Academy Encyclopaedia of Wales. Cardiff: University of Wales Press. ISBN 978-0-7083-1953-6.
- Davis, Paul R. (1989). Historic Rhondda. Ynyshir: Hackman. ISBN 0-9508556-3-4.
- Hopkins, K.S. (1975). Rhondda Past and Future. Ferndale: Rhondda Borough Council.
- John, Arthur H. (1980). Glamorgan County History, Volume V, Industrial Glamorgan from 1700 to 1970. Cardiff: University of Wales Press.
- Lewis, E.D. (1959). The Rhondda Valleys. London: Phoenix House.
- May, John (2003). Rhondda 1203 - 2003: The Story of the Two Valleys. Caerphilly: Castle Publications. ISBN 1-871354-09-9.
- Morgan, Prys (1988). Glamorgan County History, Volume VI, Glamorgan Society 1780 to 1980. Cardiff: University of Wales Press. ISBN 0-904730-05-0.
- Smith, David (1980). Fields of Praise, The Official History of the Welsh Rugby Union 1881-1981. Cardiff: University of Wales Press. ISBN 0-7083-0766-3.
- Smith, J. Beverley (1971). "The Kingdom of Morgannwg and the Norman Conquest of Glamorgan". In Pugh, T. B. (ed.). Glamorgan County History. Vol. III: The Middle Ages. Cardiff: University of Wales Press. OCLC 4121242.
- Stanton, Y. C. (1984). "The Old and Middle Stone Ages II. The Mesolithic period: early post-glacial hunter-gatherer communities in Glamorgan". In Savory, H. N. (ed.). Glamorgan County History. Vol. II: Early Glamorgan, prehistory and early history. Cardiff: Glamorgan County History Trust. OCLC 4121242.
- Williams, Chris (1996). Democratic Rhondda: politics and Society 1885-1951. Cardiff: University of Wales Press.
