= Marion Loeffler =

Marion Loeffler (Marion Löffler) FRHistS is a Reader in Welsh History at Cardiff University. She is an expert on Wales in British, European and Empire contexts in the eighteenth and nineteenth centuries.

== Life and education ==
Loeffler is originally from Berlin, and received her PhD from the Humbolt University of Berlin in 1994.

== Research ==
Loeffler has published research on the cultural history of Wales from the eighteenth to the twentieth centuries, concentrating on the development of political concepts in Britain and their expressions in Welsh, knowledge exchanges by cultural adaptation, and how Wales was linked into a wider scholarly community by international diplomats and scholars, and but also with the British Empire. Her project 'Knowledge Transfer and Social Networks: European Learning and the Revolution in Welsh Victorian Scholarship' (2014–2016)' was funded by the Leverhulme Trust. It explored the life, times and European connections of the historian and social reformer Thomas Stephens of Merthyr Tydfil.

Loeffler is Assistant Editor of the Dictionary of Welsh Biography, where she aims to increase the number of entries on women and written by women. She contributes regularly to media platforms such as The Conversation and the BBC. One of her heroes is the Egyptologist Käthe Bosse-Griffiths.

== Select bibliography ==
- (with B. Jenkins) Political pamphlets and sermons from Wales, 1790-1806. Wales and the French Revolution (Cardiff: University of Wales Press, 2014)
- Welsh responses to the French Revolution: press and public discourse 1789-1802 (Cardiff: University of Wales Press, 2012)
- The literary and historical legacy of Iolo Morganwg 1826-1926 (Cardiff: University of Wales Press, 2007)
- 'A Book of Mad Celts': John Wickens and the Celtic Congress of Caernarfon 1904 (Gwasg Gomer, 2000)
- English und Kymrisch in Wales: Geschichte der Sprachpolitik und Sprachsituation (Verlag Dr Kovac, 1997)
