= J. Gwyn Griffiths =

British writer and activist (1911–2004)

- Griffiths with his wife Kate on their wedding day in 1939
- Born: John Gwyn Griffiths; 7 December 1911; Porth, Wales
- Died: 15 June 2004 (aged 92); Swansea, Wales
- Occupation: Professor
- Spouse: Käthe Bosse-Griffiths
- Children: 2
- Writing career
- Literary movement: Cadwgan Circle

John Gwyn Griffiths (7 December 1911 – 15 June 2004) was a Welsh poet, egyptologist and nationalist political activist who spent the largest span of his career lecturing at Swansea University.

== Early life ==
Born in 1911 in Porth in the Rhondda Valley, Griffiths was educated at Porth Grammar school before reading Latin at University College, Cardiff, of the University of Wales (now Cardiff University), gaining a first class degree in 1932. He then graduated with a first class degree in Greek in 1933, and obtained a first class teacher's diploma in 1934. At Cardiff Griffiths was influenced by Classicist Kathleen Freeman who kindled the interest in Egyptology that would dominate his scholarly career.

Griffiths obtained an M.A. degree at Liverpool University on the influence of Ancient Egypt on Greek religion in the Mycenean period. Between 1936 and 1937 he was an archaeological assistant with the Egyptian Exploration Society at Sesebi, Lower Nubia. Having studied at Queen's College, Oxford, from 1936 to 1939 he obtained a D.Phil. degree from Oxford University on the quarrel of Horus and Seth in 1949.

At Oxford, Griffiths met Käthe Bosse-Griffiths, a German-born refugee of German and Jewish ancestry, who shared academic and literary interests with him and was a scholar in Egyptology; later she became Keeper of Archaeology at Swansea Museum. They married on 13 September 1939 and set up home in 14 St. Stephen's Avenue, Pentre, Rhondda.

Griffiths's writing was influenced by the European avant-garde movement, especially that of Dadaist Kurt Schwitters. Griffiths, along with his wife, set up a writing and intellectual circle in the Rhondda for like-minded thinkers. The group, named the Cadwgan Circle (Cylch Cadwgan), was attended by prominent Welsh language writers from the Rhondda, including Rhydwen Williams, Euros Bowen, Pennar Davies and J. Kitchener Davies.

== Academic and political career ==
Griffiths took up a teaching post (Latin) at Bala Grammar School in 1934, and then teaching at his old school in Porth in 1939. He was a conscientious objector during the Second World War. In 1946 he was appointed lecturer in Classics at University College, Swansea. From 1957 to 1958 he was a Lady Wallis Budge Research Lecturer at University College, Oxford, and in 1959 he was promoted to a senior lectureship at Swansea, becoming reader in Classics in 1965. In 1973 he was awarded a personal Chair in Classics and Egyptology at Swansea.

In 1946 he and his wife moved to the Uplands, Swansea, and in 1957 to Sketty in Swansea. In 1946 he began editing the Welsh Magazine, Y Fflam (The Flame) with Euros Bowen, mainly as a response to W. J. Gruffydd's Y Llenor (The Literary Man), a Professor of Welsh at Cardiff, whom the Cadwgan Circle saw as the antiquated voice of Welsh language politics.

During this period Griffiths became more and more associated with the national party for Wales, Plaid Genedlaethol Cymru, and from 1948 until 1952 edited the party's newspaper, Y Ddraig Goch. Griffiths also stood as a Plaid Cymru candidate in the 1959 and 1964 general elections, on both occasions for the Gower constituency, but was not elected. Griffiths was also an important figure in the promotion of Welsh language in education and law, and on several occasions was arrested in nonviolent protests.

He lectured at a wide array of universities, including Cairo (1965–66 as visiting professor), Tübingen, Bonn and All Souls College, Oxford (as visiting fellow). Griffiths wrote several major works on Egyptian religion, as well as work on Latin and Greek texts. However, he is better known in Wales for his poetry, of which he published four collections of texts, all in the Welsh language. He also wrote literary criticism, most notably I Ganol y Frwydr (Into the Thick of Battle) in 1970.

He retired in 1979, but continued writing on classical and egyptological themes. Among his output are two of his most important academic texts, his editions of Plutarch's De Iside et Osiride (1970) and Apuleius of Madaura's The Isis Book (1975), from the last book of the Golden Ass. He edited the Journal of Egyptian Archaeology between 1970 and 1978.

His later substantial books include The Origins of Osiris and his Cult (1980), Atlantis and Egypt (1991), The Divine Verdict (1991), and Triads and Trinity (1996) as well as contributing to The Cambridge History of Judaism (1999). He obtained D.Litt. (Oxford) and D.D. (Wales) degrees for his contributions to the study of the ancient world.

Griffiths had two sons with Bosse, Robat Gruffudd (born 1943) and Heini Gruffudd (born 1946).

== Works of note ==
=== Poetry ===
- Yr Efengyl Dywyll (1944)
- Cerddi Cadwgan (1953), a collection of works from members of the Cadwgan Circle
- Ffroenau'r Draig (1961)
- Cerddi Cairo (1969)
- Cerddi'r Holl Eneidiau (1981)
- Hog dy Fwyell (2007), a full collection of J. Gwyn Griffiths's poems

=== Academic work ===
- The Conflict of Horus and Seth (1960)
- Plutarch's De Iside et Osiride (1970)
- Apuleius of Madaura's The Isis Book (1975) (editor)
- The Origins of Osiris and his Cult (1980)
- The Divine Verdict: A Study of the Divine Judgement in the Ancient Religions (1990)
- Triads and Trinity (1996)
- Oxford Encyclopedia of Ancient Egypt, contributor (2001)

=== Literary criticism ===
- I Ganol y Frwydr (1970)
