= Pentre =

Village in Rhondda Cynon Taf, Wales

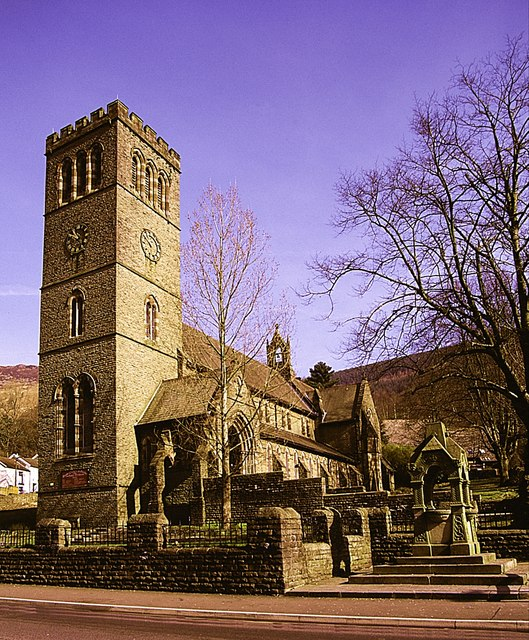
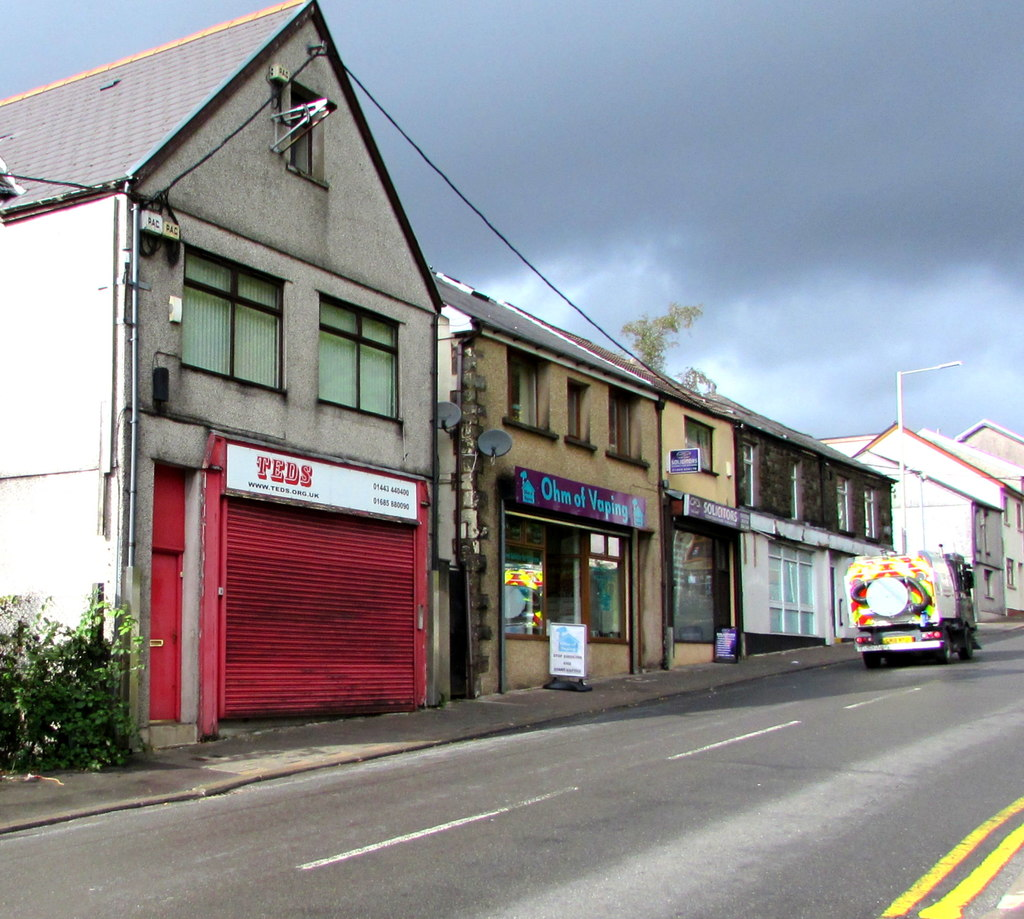
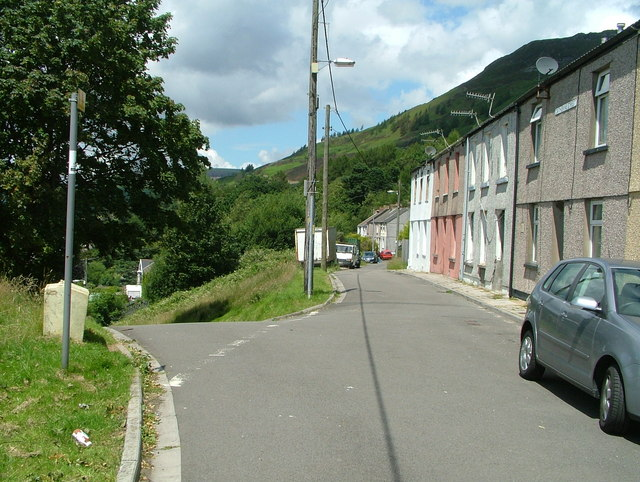
- From the top: St Peters' Church, Ystrad Road, Catherine Street

- Location within Rhondda Cynon Taf
- Population: 5,300 (2021)
- OS grid reference: SS968961
- Principal area: Rhondda Cynon Taf
- Preserved county: Mid Glamorgan
- Country: Wales
- Sovereign state: United Kingdom
- Post town: Pentre
- Postcode district: CF41
- Dialling code: 01443
- Police: South Wales
- Fire: South Wales
- Ambulance: Welsh
- UK Parliament: Rhondda and Ogmore
- Senedd Cymru – Welsh Parliament: Afan Ogwr Rhondda
- List of places UK Wales Rhondda Cynon Taf 51.654736°N 3.492269°W Community map: Map of the community

Pentre is a village, community and electoral ward near Treorchy in the Rhondda valley, within the county borough of Rhondda Cynon Taf, Wales. The community includes the neighbouring village of Ton Pentre. The area was originally farmland, but grew rapidly after coal mining began in the 1850s. Pentre Colliery was the site of a major explosion in 1871 that killed 38 men. The village later became a commercial and administrative centre for the upper Rhondda Fawr. It was also home to the Rhondda Engine Works, a manufacturer of colliery machinery. St Peter's Church, known as the "Cathedral of the Rhondda", is a Grade II* listed building.

== Toponymy ==
The name derives from the Welsh word pentref, meaning "village" or "homestead". In this instance, the name originally referred to a substantial farmstead known as Y Pentref, which pre-dated the development of the mining village.

== History ==
=== Industrial development ===
Before industrialisation, the area that became Pentre consisted of several scattered farms, including Pentre and Maendy, which were worked by tenant farmers for absentee landlords.

In 1857, Edward Curteis of Llandaff leased the mineral rights of Tir y Pentre from Griffith Llewellyn of Baglan, after which the Pentre and Church levels were opened. By early 1864, the Pentre Coal Company had opened shafts to the deeper steam-coal seams and sunk a second pit at Pentre.

Pentre Breweries was formed in 1875, and its ales were distributed to public houses throughout the South Wales Valleys.

Another major local enterprise was the Rhondda Engine Works, established by Griffith Llewellyn and William Cubitt in 1874. The works included an engine house, iron and brass foundries, a boiler shop and a smithy. It manufactured pithead frames, cages and other colliery machinery for mines throughout South Wales. By the beginning of the 20th century, the works employed more than 100 skilled workers. It was dismantled in 1915.

=== Pentre Colliery disaster ===
On 24 February 1871, an explosion at Pentre Colliery killed 38 men, including two who died during the rescue operation. The disaster left twenty widows and 70 orphaned children. It was the first recorded explosion in the Two Feet Nine Inch Seam in either the Rhondda or Aberdare valleys; the seam had not previously been regarded as particularly prone to explosions.

=== Twentieth century ===
By the early 1900s, Pentre was regarded as the principal shopping area for the upper Rhondda Fawr. The village also developed as a centre of local government.

In October 1916, a landslide at Pentre engulfed several shops and a skating rink and nearly severed road communications between the upper and lower Rhondda Fawr. The incident led the local authority to construct a second road between Ton Pentre and Cwmparc.

== Landmarks ==
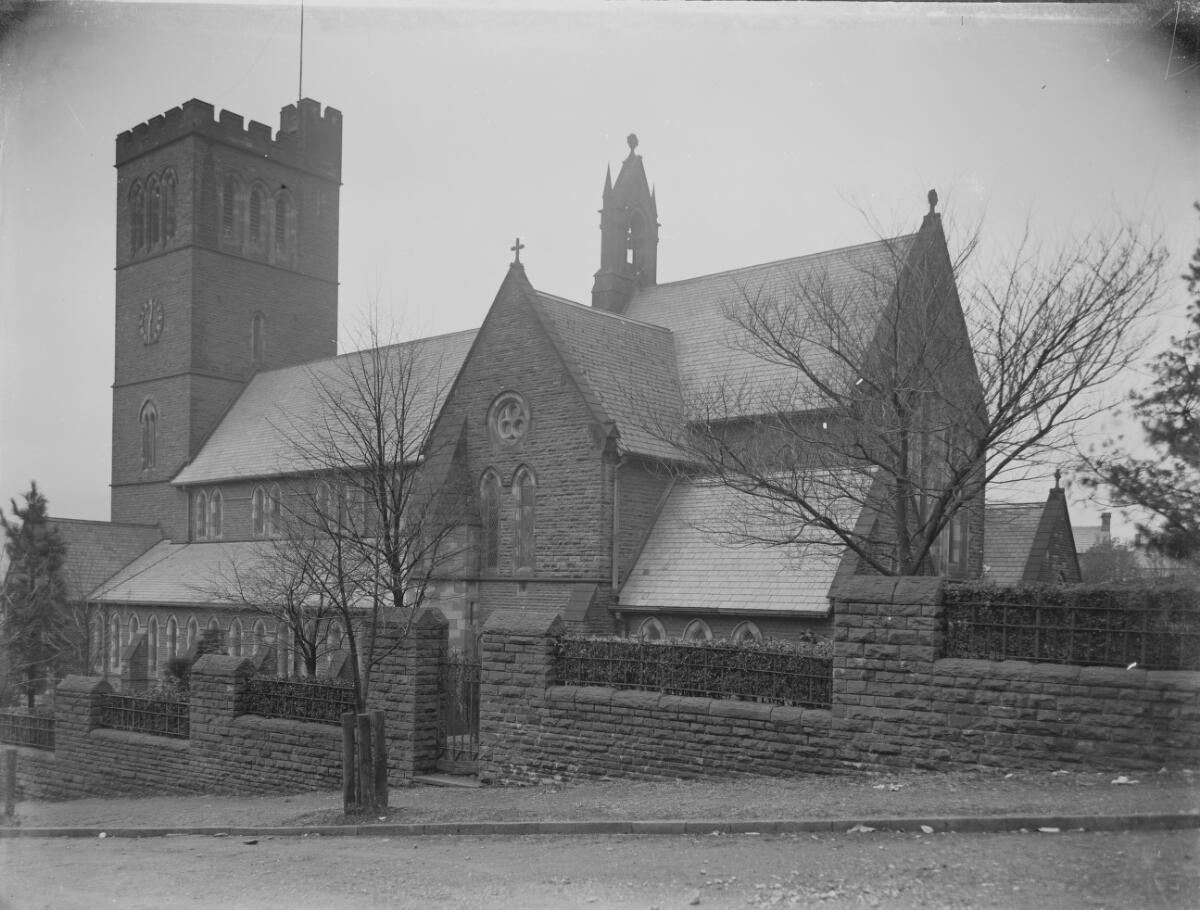
St Peter's Church

The former Rhondda Borough Council Offices in Llewellyn Street are a Grade II listed building. They were erected in 1883–84 by the Ystradyfodwg Local Board as municipal offices, at a cost of £4,000. The building subsequently housed Rhondda Urban District Council and Rhondda Borough Council. It has a symmetrical palazzo-style frontage and retains a number of late-Victorian interior features, including coloured glass, decorative tiled floors, wood panelling and an imperial staircase.

St Peter's Church was commissioned by the mine owner Griffith Llewellyn and completed after his death at the expense of his widow. Designed by F. R. Kempson and J. B. Fowler in the Early English Gothic style, it was built in 1888–89 at a cost of approximately £20,000 and was consecrated on 28 July 1890. Its interior retains polychrome stonework, original furnishings and a Father Willis organ dating from 1890. Known as the "Cathedral of the Rhondda", the church is a Grade II* listed building and an architectural landmark in the Rhondda Fawr.

== Culture ==
In 1939, the Egyptologists and writers Käthe Bosse-Griffiths and J. Gwyn Griffiths moved to Pentre. Their home became a meeting place for writers, poets and pacifists who formed Cylch Cadwgan (the Cadwgan Circle). Its members included Pennar Davies and Rhydwen Williams. The circle was associated with Christian pacifism and Welsh nationalism and sought to make Welsh-language literature more receptive to European modernist influences and contemporary social and political issues.

== Governance ==
The Pentre electoral ward is coterminous with the borders of the Pentre community and elects two county councillors to Rhondda Cynon Taf County Borough Council. Since 1995 representation has been by the Labour Party or Plaid Cymru. Two Plaid Cymru councillors were elected in May 2012 and re-elected in 2017 and 2022.

== Flooding ==
Pentre was affected by several flooding incidents during 2020. The most severe occurred during Storm Dennis on 15–16 February, when 159 residential properties and ten commercial properties were flooded internally and roads throughout the village were extensively affected. A subsequent investigation by Rhondda Cynon Taf County Borough Council identified water overflowing from ordinary watercourses and the obstruction of a culvert inlet above Pentre Road among the principal causes and pathways of the flooding.

As of July 2026, the council was developing a wider flood-alleviation scheme for Pentre, informed by the findings of the Storm Dennis investigation.

== Sport ==
As of July 2026, Ton Pentre A.F.C. compete in the Championship division of the South Wales Premier League. The club were members of the highest league in Welsh football – the League of Wales – from 1993 until 1996, and have since won the Welsh Football League First Division title six times.

== Notable people ==
- Alan Curtis (born 1954), Wales international footballer and coach, born in Pentre.
- Käthe Bosse-Griffiths (1910–1998), German-born Egyptologist and Welsh-language author, who lived in Pentre from 1939 and helped establish the Cadwgan Circle there.
- John Hedley Cule (1920–2015), physician and medical historian, born in Ton Pentre.
- J. Gwyn Griffiths (1911–2004), classical scholar, Egyptologist, poet and Welsh nationalist, whose Pentre home became the centre of the Cadwgan Circle.
- Stan Griffiths (1911–2003), footballer
- John Morgan Lloyd (1880–1960), musician and minor composer
- Jimmy Murphy (1910–1989), Wales national-team manager and Manchester United coach, born in Treharne Street, Pentre.
- Rhydwen Williams (1916–1997), Welsh-language poet, novelist and broadcaster, born in Pentre.
