= Käthe Bosse-Griffiths =

Welsh-German Egyptologist (1910–1998)

- Bosse-Griffiths with her husband J. Gwyn Griffiths in 1939
- Born: Käthe Bosse; 16 July 1910; Wittenberg, German Empire
- Died: 4 April 1998 (aged 87); Swansea, Wales
- Occupation: Curator
- Spouse: J. Gwyn Griffiths
- Children: Robat Gruffudd; Heini Gruffudd
- Writing career
- Movement: Cadwgan Circle

Käthe Bosse-Griffiths (16 July 1910 – 4 April 1998) was an eminent Egyptologist. Born in Germany, she moved to Britain as a political refugee and married a Welshman. She became a writer in the Welsh language, and made a unique contribution to Welsh literature.

== Early years ==
Käthe Bosse was born in Wittenberg in Germany in 1910, the second of four children. Her father, Paul Bosse (1881-1947), was a distinguished gynaecologist and head of Wittenberg town hospital. Her mother Käthe Bosse (née Levin, 1886-1944) was of Jewish parentage, but Bosse was brought up in the Lutheran Church. After completing secondary school in her hometown, she was admitted to the Ludwig-Maximilians-Universität München, where she gained a doctorate in Classics and Egyptology in 1935. Her thesis focused on the human figure in late Egyptian sculpture. Soon after, she started work at the Egyptology and Archaeology Department of the Berlin State Museums, but she and her father were dismissed from their posts when it emerged that her mother was Jewish.

Bosse escaped Nazi persecution and left Germany for Britain in 1936. She worked as assistant to the zoologist and classical scholar D'Arcy Wentworth Thompson. She found research work at the Petrie Museum at the University College London and later at the Ashmolean Museum in Oxford. In 1938, while at Oxford as a senior member of Somerville College, she met a fellow Egyptologist and research student, J. Gwyn Griffiths. Griffiths, a Welsh and Classics scholar was brought up in the Rhondda and graduated from University College Cardiff (now Cardiff University) where his influence in Ancient Egypt was kindled by Kathleen Freeman.

Bosse and Griffiths returned to the Rhondda and made their home in the village of Pentre, living at 14 St Stephen's Avenue. Griffiths had been appointed a teacher at Porth County School. They married in 1939 and Bosse became Käthe Bosse-Griffiths. Bosse and Griffiths had two sons, Robat Gruffudd (born 1943) and Heini Gruffudd (born 1946).

During the Second World War, Bosse-Griffiths and her husband set up the Cadwgan Circle from their home in Pentre, an avant-garde literary and intellectual group, whose members included Pennar Davies and Rhydwen Williams. Among these literary Welsh speakers, Bosse-Griffiths found a love of the Welsh language. During the same years in Germany, Bosse-Griffiths's mother died at Ravensbrück, a notoriously evil concentration camp for women. Her brothers Günther and Fritz had both been imprisoned and then served at Zöschen camp. An order for them to be killed near the end of the war was not carried out. Her sister Dorothee was imprisoned for six weeks, but released.

== Academic and literary career ==
When her husband became a lecturer at Swansea University, the couple moved to Uplands and then Sketty in Swansea. Bosse-Griffiths became a member of Swansea Museum, where she became Keeper of Archaeology, a role she undertook for 25 years, curating the collections almost to the day she died. She helped to bring Sir Henry Wellcome's Egyptian collection out of storage and into the Department of Classics at Swansea, where Bosse-Griffiths spent the next twenty years researching its 5,000 items. This Wellcome collection is now held at the Egypt Centre at Swansea University.

Bosse-Griffiths was a published author writing in Welsh on German pacifist movements in Mudiadau Heddwch yn yr Almaen (1942). Her academic work included Amarna Studies and Other Collected Papers (1955). She also published scores of articles on archaeological matters.

Bosse-Griffiths' literary output of short stories and novels included Anesmwyth Hoen (1941), Fy Chwaer Efa a Storïau Eraill (1944), Mae'r Galon wrth y Llyw (1957; reprinted with a new introduction in 2016 by Honno Welsh Women's Classics), and Cariadau (1995), and two travel books, Trem ar Rwsia a Berlin (1962), and Tywysennau o'r Aifft (1970). Her novels and short stories concentrate on Welsh women's lives and ideas which were taboo, such as abortion, adultery, and women's relationship with religion.

Bosse-Griffiths' son Heini wrote A Haven from Hitler, which told the story of her family and escape from Nazi Germany.
