= Rhydwen Williams =

- Born: Robert Rhydwenfro Williams; 29 August 1916; Pentre, Rhondda, Wales
- Died: 2 August 1997 (aged 80); Merthyr Tydfil, Wales
- Education: Swansea University; Bangor University
- Occupations: Poet, novelist, minister, television presenter
- Spouse: Margaret Davies (m. 1943)
- Children: 1
- Writing career
- Language: Welsh
- Years active: 1940s–1997
- Notable works: Cwm Hiraeth trilogy Yr Arloeswr; Yr Ffynhonnau
- Notable awards: National Eisteddfod Crown (1946, 1964)
- Movement: Welsh nationalism

Robert Rhydwenfro Williams (29 August 1916 – 2 August 1997), known professionally as Rhydwen Williams, was a Welsh poet, novelist, Baptist minister, and broadcaster. Writing primarily in his native Welsh, he was noted for modernising traditional Welsh poetic forms by applying them to the industrial landscapes and social realities of the twentieth century, while retaining the strict metres and prosody of the bardic tradition.

A two-time winner of the Crown at the National Eisteddfod of Wales, he was associated with the Cadwgan Circle of writers and intellectuals, and his semi-autobiographical trilogy Cwm Hiraeth is widely regarded as his most important work. Beyond literature, Williams was a prominent advocate of Welsh nationalism, an influential voice in religious and cultural life, and a presenter of Welsh-language television programmes during the early years of broadcasting in Wales.

== Life ==
Robert Rhydwenfro Williams was born in Pentre, a village in the Rhondda in Wales, on 29 August 1916. He was one of four children. Like most families in the area at that time, Williams' family worked in the coal mining industry but, after an economic depression struck the area, his family moved to England in search of work, settling in the village of Christleton, in 1931. Williams stayed in England for some time, about ten years, before returning to Wales in 1941. Fortunately for Williams, he found more opportunities in Wales than he did in England, where he'd worked menial jobs; he was made pastor of a Baptist chapel in Ynyshir and was able to study, although intermittently, at both Swansea University, then known as University College of Swansea, and Bangor University. During World War II, in the midst of the Liverpool Blitz, Williams served in a Quaker relief unit, having been a conscientious objector as both a pacifist and a Welsh nationalist. Additionally, for his gifted speaking voice, comparable with that of Welsh actor Richard Burton, he would often read poetry for the Welsh version of the Home Service on the BBC and found popularity as a minister, despite his anti-war pro-Wales stance.

As a member of the Cadwgan Circle, he mixed with fellow members J. Gwyn Griffiths, Pennar Davies and Gareth Alban Davies, and was especially close to J. Kitchener Davies. From this informal group of like-minded intellectuals, Williams developed a style of writing and literal ethic opposed to eisteddfodic tradition. Amongst his heroes were writers Aldous Huxley, W H Auden and George Orwell. Although Williams' poetry was not in keeping with the tradition of the National Eisteddfod, he was still embraced by it. In 1946, at Mountain Ash, he won the Crown competition for the poem Yr Arloeswr (English: The Pioneer) and again in 1964 for Yr Ffynhonnau (English: The Springs).

Leaving Ynyshir in 1946 he travelled Wales, holding pastorates at Resolven and Pont-lliw near Swansea until 1959, before spending a year at Rhyl. Williams later moved from his ministry to accept a post at Granada Television in Manchester, presenting Welsh language programmes, in which his skills as a communicator came to the fore. He wrote television scripts; one about Dietrich Bonhoeffer was the first Welsh-language television play to be broadcast on a foreign network.

Of all Williams' work, his trilogy Cwm Hiraeth is seen by many as his finest achievement; semi-autobiographical, the three books form a prose epic of life in the depression hit Rhondda through the eyes of the author's Uncle Sion, a poet and thinker.

In the 1970s, Williams and his family lived in a council house at Coed yr Haf, in Ystrad Mynach, where he continued to be an active member of the Welsh political party Plaid Cymru. He suffered a stroke in 1981, which had a negative effect on his physical health for the remainder of his life. Nonetheless, despite his health, he continued to actively write and publish new material, serving an editor of Barn, a Welsh-language current affairs magazine, from 1980 until 1985. He died in Merthyr Tydfil on 29 August 1997, at the age of 81, leaving behind his wife and son.

== Major works ==
=== Novels ===
- Y Briodas (English: The Wedding, 1969)
- Y Siol Wen (English: The White Shawl, 1970)
- Dyddiau Dyn (1973)
- The Angry Vineyard (1975)
- Amser i Wylo: Senghennydd 1913 (English: Time to Cry: Senghenydd 1913, 1986)

=== Poetry ===
- Barddoniaeth Rhydwen Williams: Y casgliad cyflawn 1941-1991 (1991)

== Bibliography ==
- Davies, John; Jenkins, Nigel (2008). The Welsh Academy Encyclopaeia of Wales. Cardiff: University of Wales Press. ISBN 978-0-7083-1953-6.
