= Meirion Pennar =

British writer and academic (1944–2010)

Dr Meirion Pennar (24 December 1944 – 9 December 2010) was a Welsh poet and academic, who translated two works of Welsh language literature.

== Early life ==
Born in Cardiff, he was the eldest of five children born to theologian and writer, Dr Pennar Davies. Brought up in Bangor, Brecon and Swansea, he graduated with an honours degree in Welsh from Swansea University, and was then a research student at Jesus College, Oxford, where he gained his D.Phil.

== Career ==
Pennar became a lecturer in Welsh in Dublin, and was then appointed lecturer in the Welsh Department, University of Wales, Lampeter from 1975. It was here that he specialised in medieval Welsh poetry and the Welsh novel in the 19th century, completing his translations of Book of Taliesin poems and The Black Book of Carmarthen, both of which remain in print. He also published two volumes of poetry, Syndod y Sêr and Pair Dadeni, and two long poems, Saga and Y Gadwyn. He resigned his position at Lampeter in 1993.

A language and political campaigner in the 1970s with the Cymdeithas yr Iaith Gymraeg (Welsh Language Society), he became a political columnist with Y Ddraig Goch, and was a parliamentary candidate for Plaid Cymru in the Swansea West constituency.

== Personal life ==
Meirion Pennar lived in Llandysul, Adpar, and Newcastle Emlyn, during which period he had a son. He returned in 2000 to Swansea to care for his ageing mother and younger brother, Geraint. He died in Swansea on 9 December 2010.

== Publications ==
- Syndod y sêr. Llyfrau'r Dryw. March 1971. ISBN 0-85339-112-2.
- Pair Dadeni. Llanerch Press. March 1978. ISBN 0-85088-458-6.
- Poems by Taliesin. Llanerch Press. December 1988. ISBN 0-947992-24-3.
- The Black Book of Carmarthen. Llanerch Press. August 1989. ISBN 0-947992-31-6.
- Peredur: Arthurian Romance from the Mabinogion. Llanerch Press. February 1991. ISBN 0-947992-54-5.
- The Battle of the Trees: Cad Goddeu. Nicholas Parry (illus.). Tern Press. 1992. ASIN B001OOX9EU.
