= Paul Child (singer) =

- Born: Paul Michael Thomas; Bridgend, Wales
- Genres: Celtic
- Occupations: Singer, musician, record producer
- Instrument: Vocals
- Years active: 1996–present
- Label: Music Wales Ltd.
- Website: www.paulchild.co.uk

Paul Child (born Paul Michael Thomas) is a Welsh folk singer who lives in Bridgend, Wales. Best known for his involvement with Welsh rugby, Child has sung the Welsh National Anthem at many of the Wales international rugby matches at the Millennium Stadium in Cardiff.

== Career ==
Child sang in a number of rock bands as a teenager and moved on to work on the circuit in Tenerife. In 1996, Child returned to Wales and continued his career.

Child self-financed the production of his first album, Wales Forever, at a cost of £2500 and it became the biggest-selling independently released album in Wales in 2000. His second album, Bread of Heaven, became the official album for the Welsh Rugby Union.

== Influences ==
Child's music has been influenced by many Welsh stars including David Alexander and Tom Jones.

== Discography ==
- Wales Forever (2000)
- Bread of Heaven (2006)
- Shine (2008)
- My Wales – The Best of Paul Child (2010)
