= St Peter's Church, Pentre =

Grade II* listed church in Wales

St Peter's Church
- "Cathedral of the Rhondda"
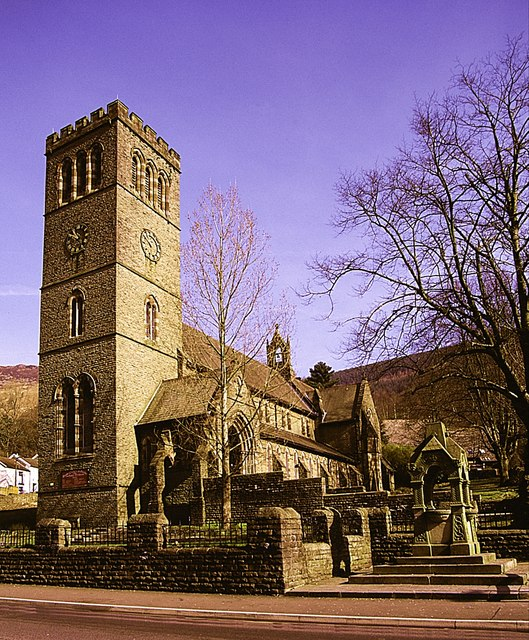

- Location within Rhondda Cynon Taf
- 51°39′18″N 3°29′28″W
- Location: Pentre
- Country: Wales
- Denomination: Church in Wales

History
- Consecrated: 28 July 1890

Architecture
- Heritage designation: Grade II*: 13126
- Designated: 12 September 1991
- Architect(s): Kempson and Fowler
- Style: Early English
- Years built: 1887–1890
- Construction cost: £20,000 (equivalent to £2,274,000 in 2025)

Specifications
- Materials: Pennant Sandstone and Welsh slate

Administration
- Parish: Ystradyfodwg

St Peter's Church is an Anglican church serving the parish of Ystradyfodwg and the village of Pentre in Rhondda Cynon Taf, Wales. It is located on Pentre Road, with the south-west end of its churchyard fronting the main thoroughfare of Llewellyn Street (A4058). It was built in the Early English style in 1887–1890 to the designs of Kempson and Fowler (Note: Sources disagree over the architect(s) of the church: The Cadw listing names F. R. Kempson and J. B. [John Bacon] Fowler, the Biographical Dictionary of Architects in Canada gives Kempson and Charles Busteed Fowler, Kelly's Directory and John Newman name only Kempson in their descriptions of the church, but elsewhere Newman associates C. B. Fowler with the partnership of Kempson & Fowler. John Betjeman credits the design to John Prichard (d. 1886) with Kempson and Fowler completing the work after his death. Prichard was the cousin of Griffith Llewellyn) and was designated as a Grade II* listed building in 1991.

== History ==
The church, known as the 'Cathedral of the Rhondda' due to its size, was commissioned by the Llewellyns of Baglan. Griffith Llewellyn was a co-founder of the Rhondda Engine Works and Madelina (née Grenfell), his wife, was responsible for the building and restoration of several churches. St. Peter's was designed by Kempson and Fowler at a cost of £20,000 (equivalent to £2,300,000 in 2025). Although Newman notes St Michael's College, Llandaff to be F. R. Kempson's most important work he describes the church at Pentre as his magnum opus. The church was built 1887–1890 and consecrated on 28 July 1890 by the Bishop of Llandaff. It was Grade II* listed in 1991.

== Architecture ==
=== Exterior ===
The church is built of coursed rock-faced masonry with a Welsh slate roof. The dressings are of banded pink and buff stone matching the polychromy of the interior. The absence of supporting buttresses helps to accentuate the height of the tall four-stage west bell-tower with its north-east stair-turret and flat battlemented top. The tower contains a clock and eight bells with the tenor weighing 26 long cwt 3 qr 10 lb (3,006 lb or 1,363 kg). There is also a bellcote over the west end of the chancel.

The church is set within a sloping churchyard with a flight of stone steps leading to the south-west gable. The churchyard is surrounded by a stone wall with iron railings. At the southern corner of the churchyard, outside of the walls, is a Grade II listed fountain which is intricately carved in a Celtic style. A sketch of the church from c. 1890 shows the vacant space into which the fountain would be placed. (Note: Cadw is most likely referring to the same image as that printed in the Architectural Record, note that it gives the architects as Kempson & Fowler.)

=== Interior ===
Contrasting Pennant Sandstone and brick have been used to create a pink and buff-coloured banded polychromy that is the predominant feature of the interior and is described by Newman as "relentless". The stained glass includes the east window by F. W. Dixon which is the most flamboyant element of the church.

The fittings within the church make use of a variety of different coloured marble. The stone pulpit (featuring scenes from life of St Peter) has colonnettes of red marble, whereas the font consists of a pink marble cylinder on grey colonnettes. The wall-to-wall reredos is of pink-veined marble with white figures under canopies in a style made popular in the 1860s by George Gilbert Scott.

The organ was built by Henry Willis & Sons in 1890 and restored by Hill, Norman & Beard in 1998.

The Dictionary of Welsh Biography notes that the flag captured at the Battle of Toski (1889) by Francis Grenfell (brother of Madelina) is in the church.
