= David Alexander (singer) =

Welsh singer and entertainer

David Alexander (1938 – 4 February 1995), born Derick Ebdon, was a Welsh singer and entertainer. He began his career singing in social clubs, eventually obtaining wider recognition. His album Reflections sold 800,000 copies in 1988.

== Early years ==
Born in Blackwood, Monmouthshire as Derick Ebdon, he left Bedwellty Grammar School at the age of 16 to support his family. He joined his father and eldest brother in the mines at Oakdale Colliery. In the years after this, he qualified as a machine engineer. It was while working at a factory in Cwmbran that he joined the Trenewydd Singers, with whom he would appear on Opportunity Knocks.

== Career ==
Alexander made his debut at a local social club, left the brake factory where he worked, and toured much of the United Kingdom, also working as an entertainer at Pontins.

David Alexander was the name given to "Ricky" Ebdon by his manager Byron Godfrey, a friend from his teens. Godfrey and his partner, Raymond John Glastonbury, had discovered and managed Tom Jones. Godfrey and Glastonbury were both from Blackwood, and were known as Myron & Byron in the music business, but Jones's contract had been bought out by Gordon Mills. Godfrey, along with Tony King (musical arranger) and Johnny Caesar (songwriter/comedian), produced Alexander's first single for EMI (Columbia), "If I could see the Rhondda one more time", in 1971, through the publishing arm of their company, Million Dollar Music Co. Ltd. It sold thousands of copies and was reissued in 1975. After a less successful single for Columbia the same year ("Dream On Dreamer"), he was released without recording an album. His next single "Taste the Wine" was released on Larry Page's Penny Farthing label in 1974 which was also released across Europe.

He released his first album So Many Ways on his own label in 1975. Initial pressings were on the North West Gramophone label but later pressings and a string of other albums, singles and EPs throughout the late 1970s, 1980s and early 1990s were released on his ACE Recordings label.

In 1980, Alexander again recorded for EMI with a single "Come Home Rhondda Boy" on Columbia and a self-titled album on their budget One-Up label. An updated version of that album was released on ACE (with eleven of the twelve original tracks and three new tracks) as Now and Then.

Alexander represented Britain at Bratislava Czechoslovakia song Festival, with Malta and Germany, amongst other countries. In 1989, he also toured Australia.

== Later years ==
In 1991, Alexander settled in Tenerife, Spain, with Penny Page, real name Beryl Critchley, Aunt of Liverpool DJ, Reminisce Festival organiser and In Demand Radio co-owner Steve Cocky. he had met her in 1976 and married in 1981.

Alexander died of a heart attack aged 56 in 1995.

== Discography ==
=== Studio albums ===
- So Many Ways (NWG 75101/ACE 10987) 1975
- All in Love is Fair (ACE 17675) 1977
- David Alexander (OU 2230) 1980 (aka Now and Then, ACE 40989)
- I Love You (ACE 17681) 1981
- Reflections (ACE 18186) 1986
- Forever and Ever (ACE) 1988
- Sign of the Times (ACE)
- One Day (ACE)
- It's Christmas (ACE 31090) 1990
- If I Never Sing Another Song (ACE) 1991
- More and More
- There You Are

=== Singles and E.P.s ===
- "If I Could See the Rhondda One More Time" (Columbia DB8754) 1971
- "Dream On Dreamer" (Columbia DB8825) 1971
- "Taste The Wine" (Penny Farthing PEN829) 1974
- So Many Ways EP (ACE 78101) 1978
- "Bennett's Mighty Men" (ACE 78201) 1978
- "The Answer to Everything" (ACE 79104) 1979
- "Come Home Rhondda Boy" (Columbia DB9078) 1980
- "I Love You" (ACE 79108) 1981
- "She Wears My Ring" (ACE 79113) 1983
- St. Teresa of the Roses EP (ACE 79114) 1984
- "The Power of Love" (ACE 79120) 1986
- "Working Man" (ACE DB19090) 1990
- "My Wales" (ACE DAR790) 1990
