= Pennar Davies =

William Thomas Pennar Davies (12 November 1911 – 29 December 1996) was a Welsh clergyman and author.

Born William Thomas Davies, in Mountain Ash, the son of a miner, he took the name "Pennar" (a stream in Mountain Ash and the root of its Welsh name Aberpennar) "as a sign of his identification with the native culture of Wales". Pennar Davies studied at University of Wales, Cardiff, at Balliol and Mansfield College, Oxford, and at Yale University. In 1943 he became a Congregational minister in Cardiff. He was subsequently professor of Church History at Bala-Bangor Theological College and Brecon Congregational Memorial College, was Principal of Brecon Congregational Memorial College from 1950 and Principal of Swansea Memorial College from 1959 until his retirement in 1979.

Davies wrote poetry under the pseudonym Davies Aberpennar. Until about 1948 he wrote in both Welsh and English, and after this almost exclusively in Welsh, which he had learnt as a young man.

A member of Plaid Cymru, he was co-opted onto its National Executive Committee (Welsh: Pwyllgor Gwaith Cenedlaethol) at Easter 1947, Literary Editor of the party's monthly newspaper, The Welsh Nationalist from March 1947 and its Editor from April 1949. During this period, the newspaper published new poetry by Idris Davies and R. S. Thomas Davies stood as a Parliamentary candidate at Llanelli in the UK general elections of 1964 and the 1966. He was a leading campaigner for Welsh language broadcasting.

Pennar Davies and his wife Rosemarie had five children. His eldest son Dr Meirion Pennar, became a leading Welsh language academic, poet and translator.

== Works ==
=== Poetry ===
- Cinio'r Cythraul (1946)
- Naw Wfft (1957)
- Yr Efrydd o Lyn Cynon (1961)
- Y Tlws yn y Lotws (1971)

=== Short stories ===
- Y Dyn a'r Llygoden Mawr (1941)
- Caregl Nwyf (1966)

=== Novels ===
- Meibion Darogan (1968)
- Mabinogi Mwys (1979)

=== Non-fiction ===
- Rhwng Chwedl a Chredo (1966)
