= Ynyshir (disambiguation) =

Ynyshir (also spelled as Ynys-hir in Welsh) is a village in Rhondda Cynon Taf, Wales.

It can also refer to:

- Ynyshir railway station, former railway station in Rhondda Cynon Taf, Wales
- Ynyshir (restaurant), restaurant in Eglwys Fach, Ceredigion, Wales
- Ynyshir Albions F.C., football club in Rhondda Cynon Taf, Wales
- Ynys-hir RSPB reserve, nature reserve in Ceredigion, Wales
- Ynyshir (electoral ward), former local electoral ward in Rhondda Cynon Taf, Wales

== See also ==
- Inisheer
