= Tylorstown railway station =

Former railway station in Wales

Tylorstown

General information
- Location: Tylorstown, Rhondda Cynon Taf; Wales
- Coordinates: 51.640559°N 3.4320456°W
- Grid reference: ST010945
- Platforms: 2

Other information
- Status: Disused

History
- Original company: Taff Vale Railway
- Post-grouping: Great Western Railway

Key dates
- 22 January 1877: Opened to goods as Tylors Town
- 24 May 1882: Opened to passengers
- 15 June 1964: Closed
Location

Tylorstown railway station served the mining community of Tylorstown in Rhondda Cynon Taf, South Wales, between 1877 and 1964.

== History & Description ==
Originally Tylors Town, the station opened in 1877. Tylorstown had a footbridge, two wooden platforms with substantial buildings and a signal box. In 1928, an additional footbridge was installed over the line near Tylorstown to enable the residents of Stanleytown to reach the centre of Tylorstown. The station was also the location of the Pontygwaith Siding, and Tylorstown Upper and Lower Sidings.

The fortunes of the Maerdy Branch declined in the mid-20th Century, and the line was eventually earmarked for closure in the Beeching Axe. The sidings at Tylorstown all closed in 1963. Passenger closure followed in 1964, and the signal box closed in 1966.

== After Closure ==
The platforms of the station were still present in 1988.

Preceding station	Disused railways	Following station
Pontygwaith Halt; Line & station closed	Taff Vale Railway; Maerdy Branch	Ferndale; Line & station closed
