= St Anne's Church, Ynyshir =

St Anne's, Ynyshir
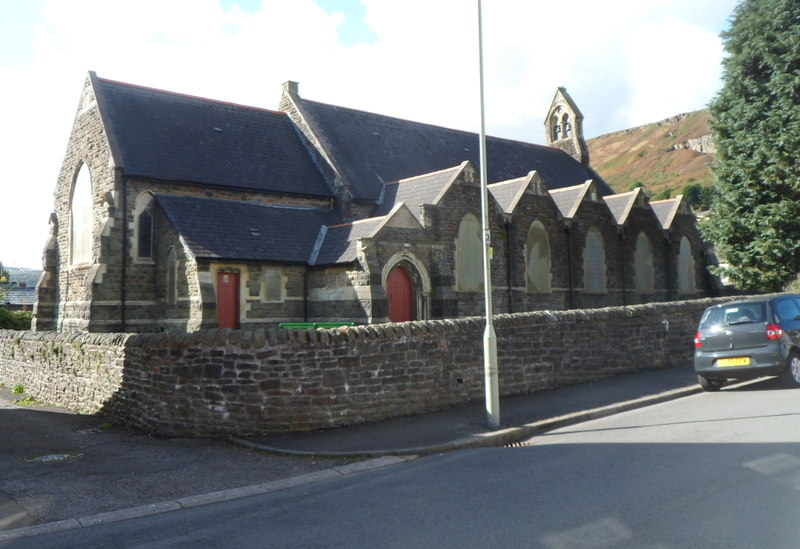
- St Anne's, Ynyshir
- 51.626445°N 3.409497°W
- Denomination: Church in Wales

History
- Status: Active
- Dedication: St Anne

Architecture
- Architect: E.M.Bruce Vaughan
- Style: Gothic Revival
- Groundbreaking: 1885
- Completed: 1886
- Closed: March 2017

Specifications
- Materials: Pennant sandstone, Bath stone

Administration
- Diocese: Diocese of Llandaff
- Archdeaconry: Morgannwg
- Deanery: Rhondda
- Parish: Ynyshir

St Anne's Church, Ynyshir is located in the Welsh village of Ynyshir in the Benefice of Tylorstown in the Rhondda Valley. It dates from the 1880s.

== History ==
The church was designed by E. M. Bruce Vaughan. It was completed in 1886, though at least one of the windows (west) dates from 1905. The organ at St Anne's, dating from 1907, was made by Harrison & Harrison

The church has a small hall which is the site of a memorial. It also acts as a polling station. St Anne's has no clerestory. The interior has a number of statues of famous preachers.

In 2014, the church hosted services to recall the centenary of the First World War. Part of the service was at the Ynyshir Cenotaph not far from the church.

St Anne's closed in March of 2017, when Fr Paul Bigmore retired.
