= Ferndale railway station =

Former railway station in Wales

Ferndale
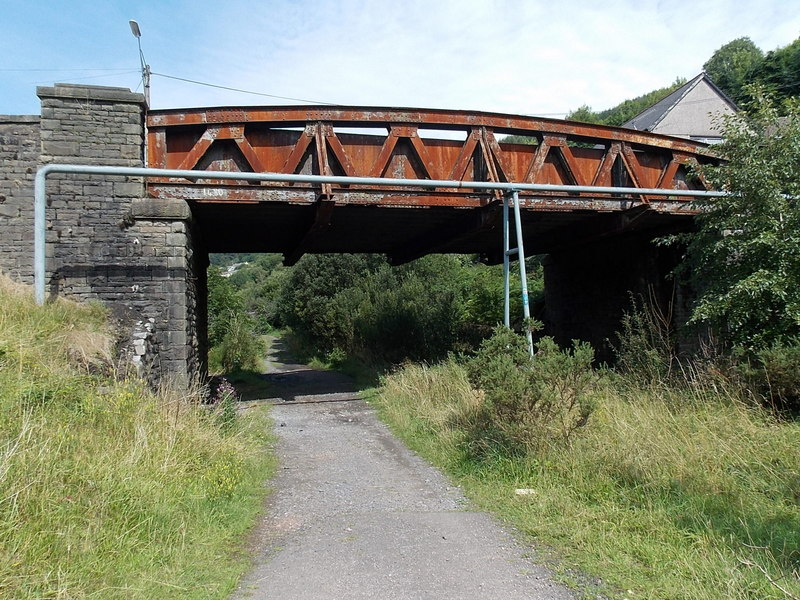
- The railway bridge in 2013

General information
- Location: Ferndale, Rhondda Cynon Taf; Wales
- Coordinates: 51.665567°N 3.4458479°W
- Grid reference: ST001973
- Platforms: 2

Other information
- Status: Disused

History
- Original company: Taff Vale Railway
- Post-grouping: Great Western Railway

Key dates
- 5 June 1876: Opened
- 7 October 1963: Closed to goods
- 15 June 1964: Closed to passengers
Location

Ferndale railway station served the Welsh mining community of Ferndale between 1876 and 1964.

== History ==
Ferndale was a large station, comprising two brick platforms with substantial buildings, sidings and a footbridge. A signal box was opened in 1920, originally named Ferndale Upper signal box, though this was latterly amended to 'Ferndale signal box' in 1952. There were also engine sheds at Ferndale, opened in 1884. The shed initially had four roads, but the Great Western Railway altered this to a two-road layout in the 1930s.

Traffic on the branch declined in the postwar years. After goods closure in 1963, the signal box closed on 14 June 1964, with passenger workings ceasing the following day. The engine shed closed in September 1964.

== After Closure ==
By 1988, the only parts of the station remaining were the two platforms and part of the stone retaining walls. The engine shed and sidings are long-gone and there is no trace of them.

Preceding station	Disused railways	Following station
Tylorstown; Line & station closed	Taff Vale Railway; Maerdy Branch	Maerdy; Line & station closed
