= Cistercian Way =

Cistercian Way can be:

- Cistercian Way (Wales), circular footpath of 650 miles (1050 km)
- Cistercian Way (England), footpath from Grange-over-Sands to Roa Island in Cumbria, 33 miles (53 km)
- Cistercian Way (Poland), bicycle track running from Poznań to the Northeast.
