= Maerdy railway station =

Former railway station in Wales

Maerdy

General information
- Location: Maerdy, Rhondda Cynon Taf; Wales
- Coordinates: 51.6761°N 3.4842°W
- Grid reference: SS975987
- Platforms: 1

Other information
- Status: Disused

History
- Original company: Taff Vale Railway
- Post-grouping: Great Western Railway

Key dates
- 18 June 1889: Opened
- 1 March 1956: Closed to goods
- 15 June 1964: Closed to passengers
Location

Maerdy railway station was a railway station in Rhondda Cynon Taf, South Wales. It served the town of Maerdy between 1889 and 1964.

== History and description ==
Maerdy was the highest railway station on the Taff Vale system, located at 900 feet at the head of the valley. Maerdy was the upper terminus of the Maerdy Branch (or Rhondda Fach branch). The station had a single platform with large brick buildings and a signal box. The sidings for Mardy Colliery also ran through the station and terminated just beyond. Maerdy also had a large carriage shed built of corrugated iron. This initially housed autotrains, and was latterly used for diesel locomotives.

== Closure and after ==
Goods traffic ended in 1956. In the later years of the line's life, there were hourly passenger workings between Maerdy and Porth, the six-mile journey taking around 20 minutes. As part of the Beeching Axe, these services were withdrawn in 1964 and the station closed. In the years after closure, traffic from the colliery continued, and a number of enthusiast specials ran over the line to Maerdy. The colliery closed in 1990 after 115 years. The platform was still intact in 1988, but after the colliery closed, the station site was completely cleared and landscaped.

Preceding station	Disused railways	Following station
Ferndale; Line & station closed	Taff Vale Railway; Maerdy Branch	Terminus
