= Maerdy =

Maerdy: Welsh: Y Maerdy
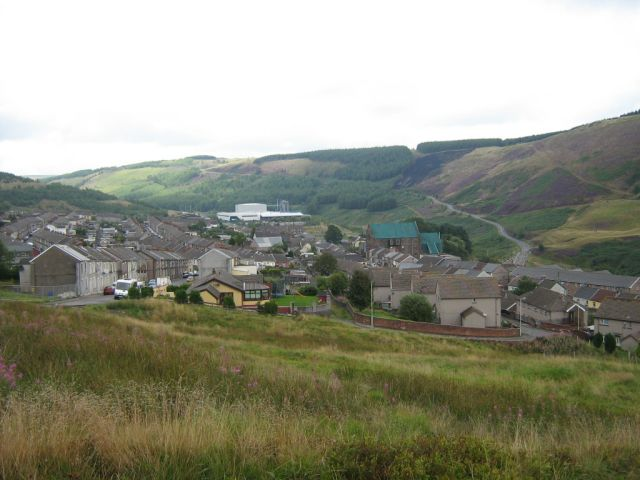
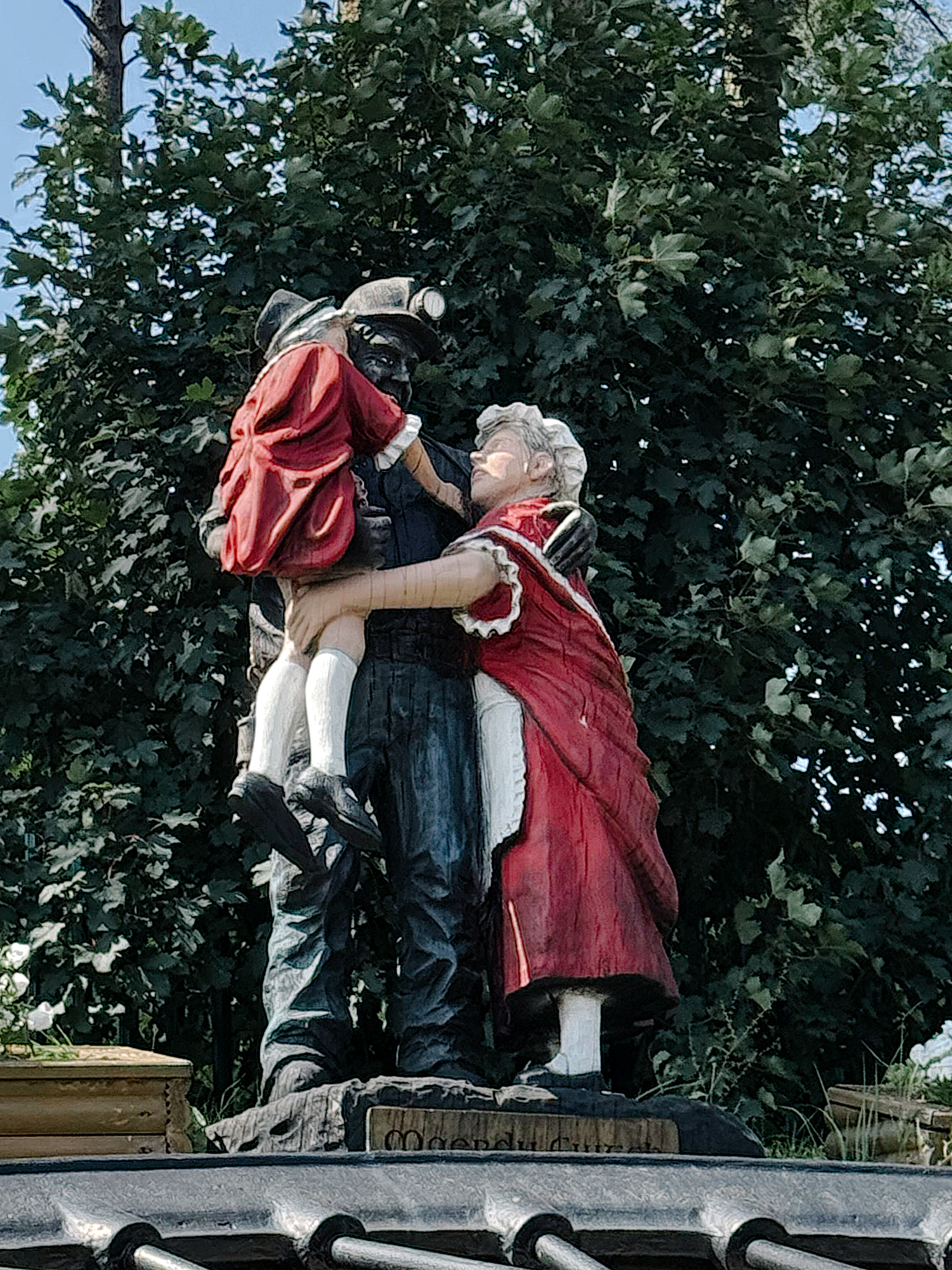
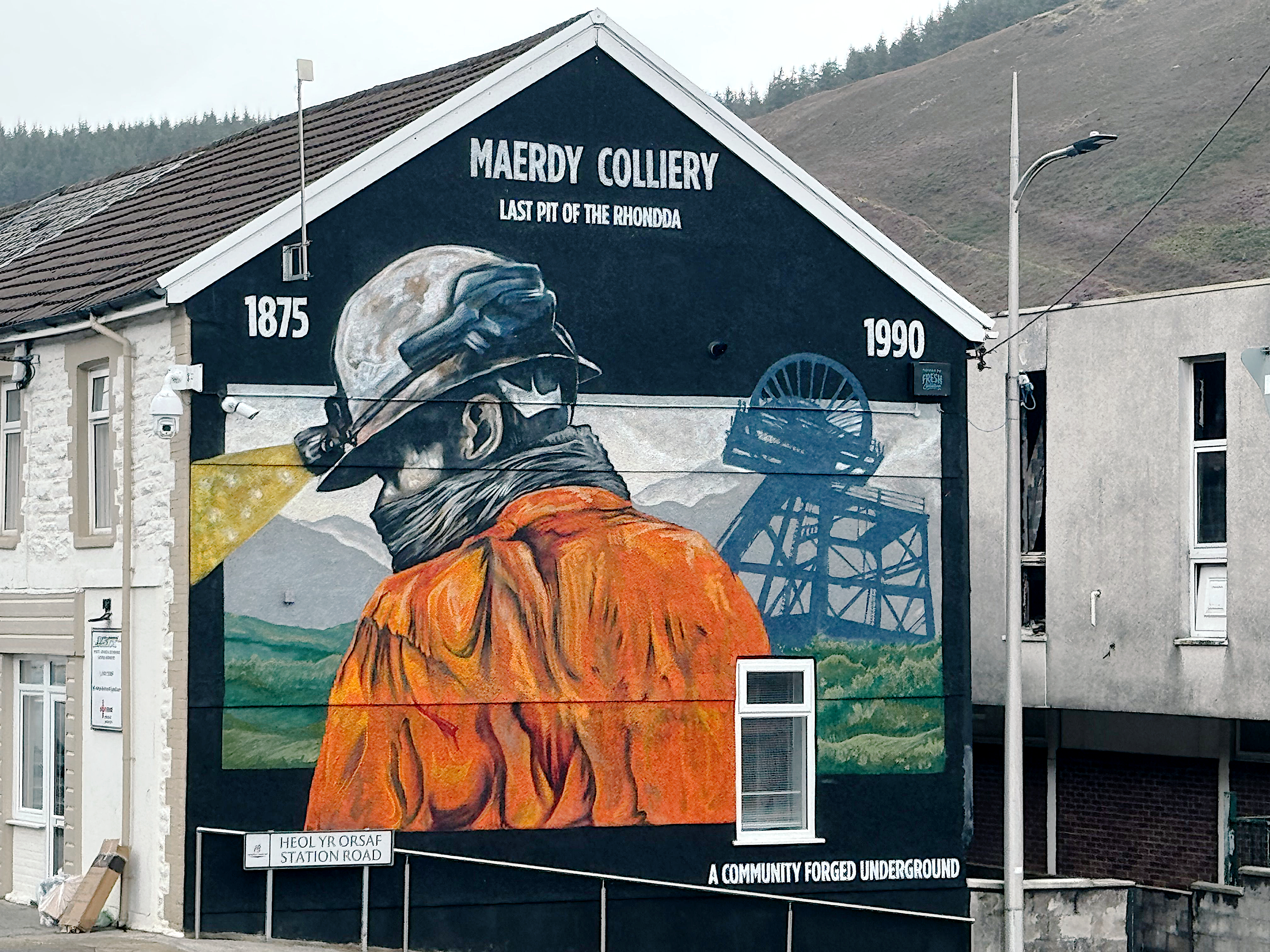
- From the top, Maerdy, the Maerdy Cwtch, the Maerdy Mural

- Location within Rhondda Cynon Taf
- Population: 3,160 (2011)
- OS grid reference: SS975981
- Principal area: Rhondda Cynon Taf
- Preserved county: Mid Glamorgan
- Country: Wales
- Sovereign state: United Kingdom
- Post town: Ferndale
- Postcode district: CF43
- Dialling code: 01443
- Police: South Wales
- Fire: South Wales
- Ambulance: Welsh
- UK Parliament: Rhondda
- Senedd Cymru – Welsh Parliament: Rhondda
- List of places UK Wales Rhondda Cynon Taf 51.672653°N 3.483313°W Community map: Map of the community

Maerdy (English: /ˈmɑːrdi/, Welsh: Y Maerdy) is a village and community (and electoral ward) in the county borough of Rhondda Cynon Taf, and within the historic county boundaries of Glamorgan, Wales, lying at the head of the Rhondda Fach Valley.

The village developed around Mardy Colliery, established in 1875, which became central to the community until its closure in 1990. Maerdy gained national prominence during the early 20th century as a centre of miners' militancy and communist politics, earning the nickname "Little Moscow" due to the radical stance of its miners' lodge. The community was home to the Maerdy Workingmen's Hall and Institute, built in 1905, which served as the social, cultural, and educational heart of the village for over a century until its demolition in 2008.

Today, with a population of 3,160, Maerdy is a post-industrial community that commemorates its mining heritage through several memorials whilst facing the challenges of economic regeneration.

== Etymology ==
The name "Maerdy" derives from Welsh maerdy, meaning "steward's house" (maer + dy). In medieval Wales, a maer was a royal or manorial steward who administered demesne lands. The local pronunciation "Mardy" reflects the Gwentian dialect form.

== History ==
=== Early settlement and coal mining development ===
The area remained largely agricultural until the late 19th century, when coal mining transformed the community. Mardy Colliery was established in 1875 by Mordecai Jones of Brecon and Wheatley Cobb, with the Abergorky seam being reached by December 1875. The colliery's development accelerated after connection to the Taff Vale Railway's Maerdy Branch in 1877, enabling coal transport to Cardiff docks.

=== The 1885 mining disaster ===
On 23 December 1885, Maerdy Colliery suffered a major explosion that killed 81 miners. The disaster occurred at approximately 2:40 pm when 750 men were underground, with 63 deaths attributed to suffocation and 18 to burns and violence. A subsequent inquiry by barrister A.G.C. Liddell criticised the practice of firing shots in the mine as "full of hazard" and highlighted inadequate safety procedures common in South Wales collieries.

=== Maerdy Workingmen's Hall and Institute ===
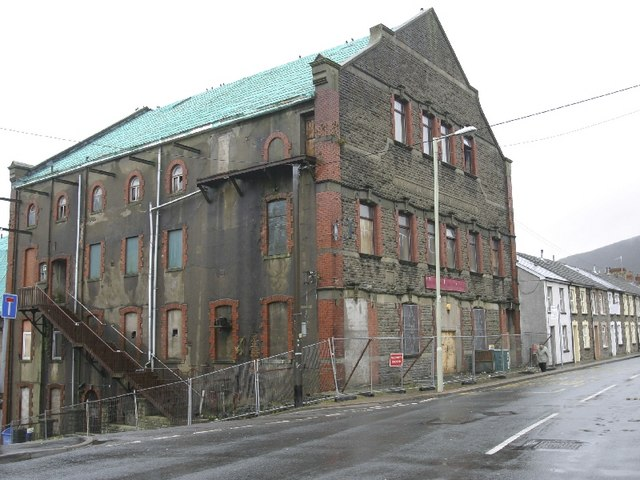
Maerdy Workingmen's Hall and Institute in its later years.

In 1905, the community completed construction of the Maerdy Workingmen's Hall and Institute, replacing an earlier Coffee Tavern from 1882. The memorial stone was laid on 13 March 1905 by Dr Sylvanus Glanville Morris. The building cost nearly £9,000 to construct and became the largest and most central building in the community.

The Institute contained extensive facilities including a large hall and balcony capable of accommodating over 1,000 people, one of the finest libraries in South Wales, a gymnasium, and separate reading rooms for men and women. The building served as the community's cultural and educational hub, hosting concerts, theatrical performances, cinema screenings, and political meetings. During severe weather when Maerdy was cut off by snow, the Hall served as a distribution centre for emergency supplies brought by rail.

The Hall was gutted by fire in 1922 but was subsequently rebuilt. By the early 2000s, the building had fallen into severe disrepair. Following a survey that estimated restoration costs would exceed £6 million, the Communities First Partnership concluded that demolition was the only viable option. The Welsh Development Agency funded the demolition, which was completed in 2008.

=== Little Moscow period ===
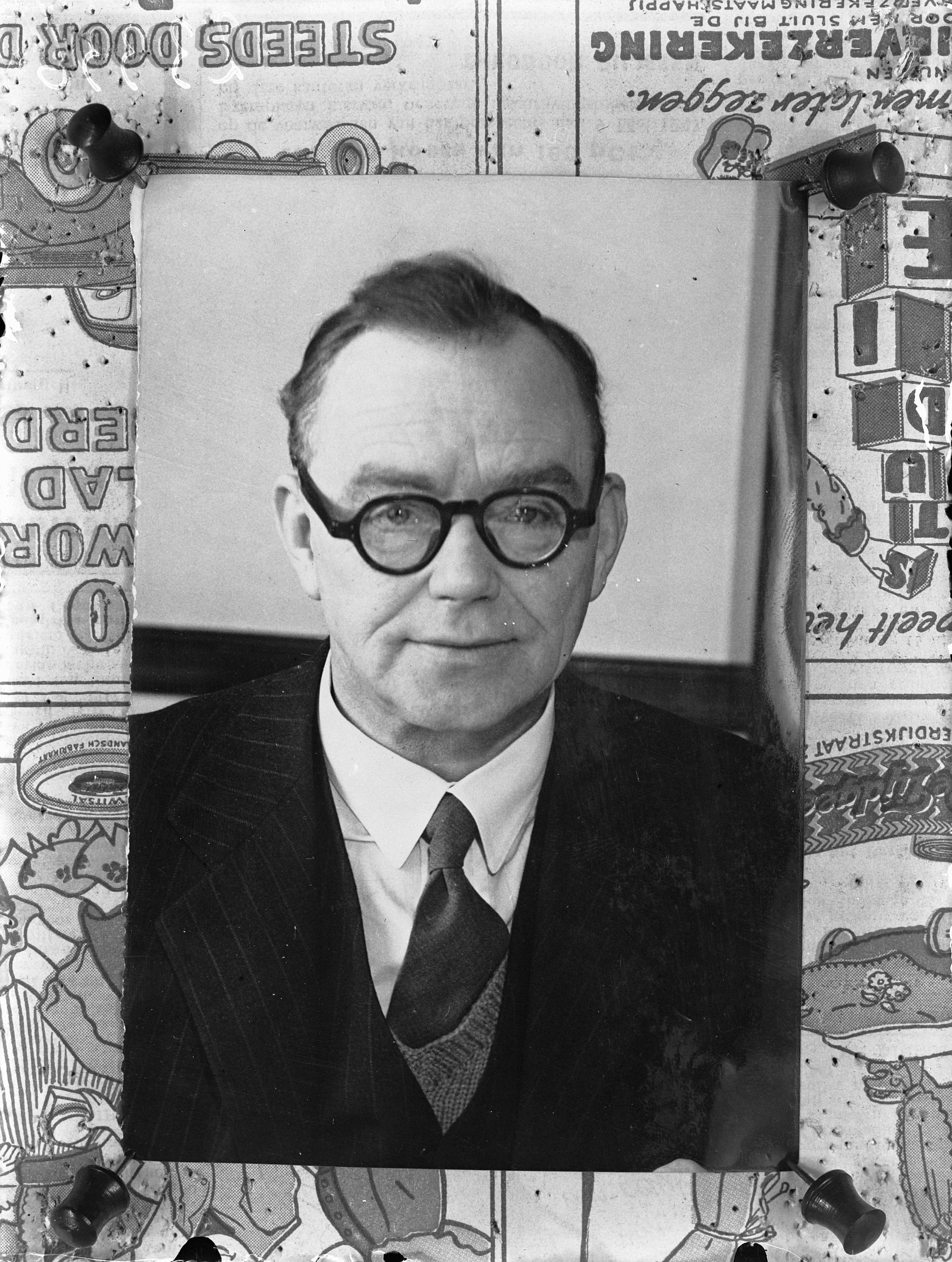
Arthur Horner helped establish the village's reputation as "Little Moscow"

Maerdy became synonymous with communist politics and miners' militancy in the early 20th century. In 1919, Arthur Horner, a prominent communist, was elected checkweighman at the colliery. Under Horner's influence, the miners' lodge developed strong ties with the Communist Party of Great Britain and earned the nickname "Little Moscow".

The lodge housed a red and gold banner, allegedly presented by A.J. Cook, the General Secretary of the Miners' Federation of Great Britain, which had been given to British miners by the working women of Krasnaya Presna, Moscow, in acknowledgement of financial support during the 1926 lockout. The banner was used on special occasions such as Communist funerals and was photographed with local Communists and a life-size portrait of Lenin.

The lodge's militancy led to its suspension from the South Wales Miners' Federation following the 1926 General Strike, and to expulsion in 1930. The term "Little Moscow" was first applied by the South Wales Daily News during this period. In 1931, Horner and 33 others were arrested and sentenced to hard labour for attempting to prevent an eviction, leading to the establishment of the Mardy Defence Committee.

=== Pit closure and memorialisation ===
Maerdy remained one of the last working mines in the South Wales valleys during the 1984-85 miners' strike, with the community maintaining solid support for the strike. The colliery finally closed in December 1990, ending over a century of coal mining in the area.

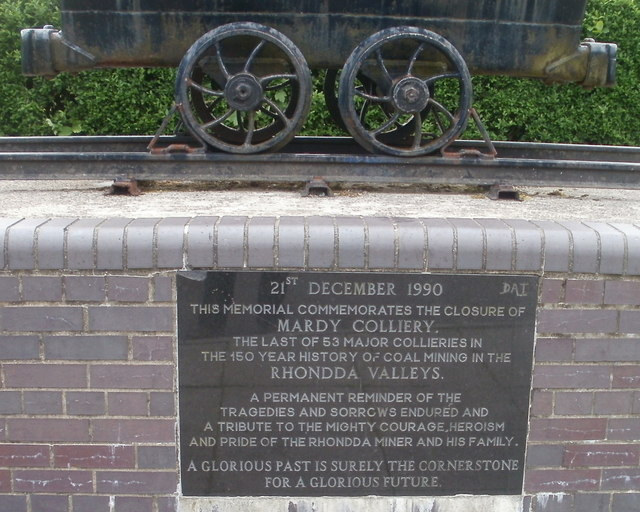
Memorial commemorating the closure of Maerdy Colliery, marking the end of coal mining in the Rhondda Valley

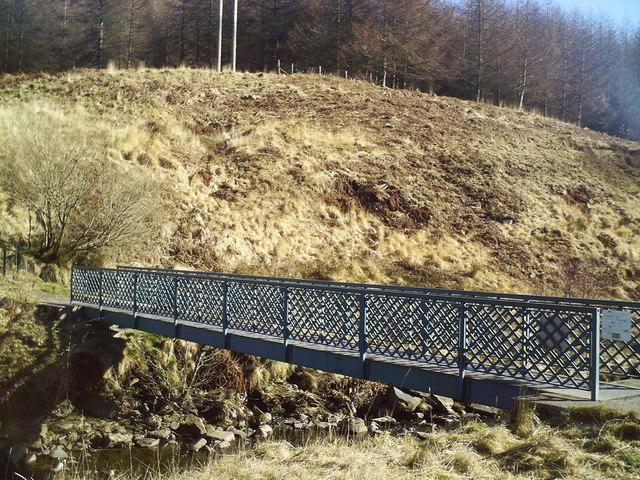
The Frank Owen Memorial Bridge

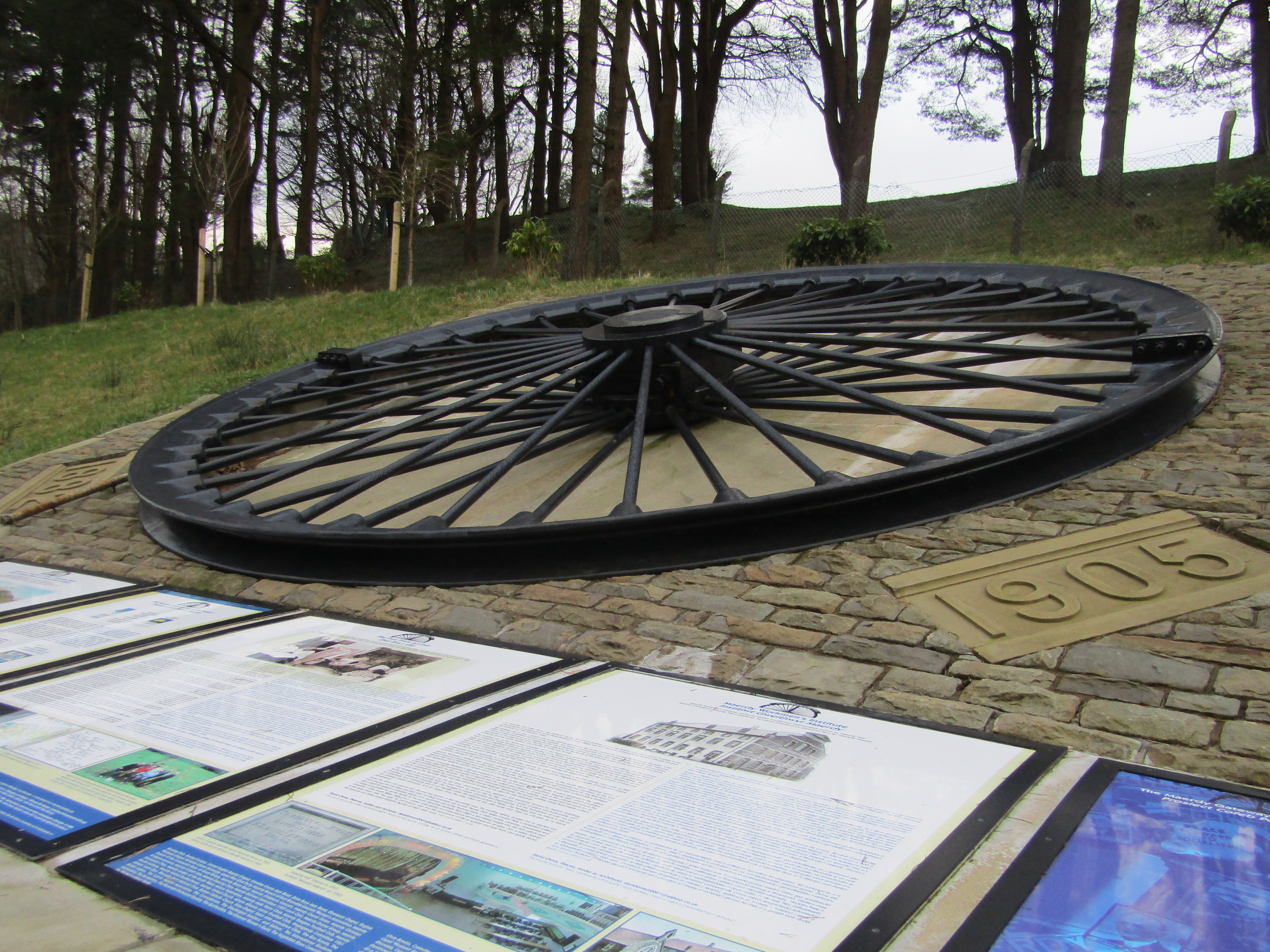
The Maerdy Gateway Miner's Memorial, commemorating the men and women who worked in Maerdy Colliery

Several memorials commemorate the area's mining heritage. Maerdy Park contains a memorial to the 1885 disaster victims, featuring a coal dram filled with coal from the colliery. War memorials honour local soldiers who died in both world wars. A bridge near the Avon factory commemorates Frank Owen of Pentre Road, who died fighting in the Spanish Civil War. In 2017, the "Maerdy Gateway" memorial was erected at the foot of the mountain road to Aberdare, featuring a pitwheel and statue of a miner holding a child, incorporating the masonry dedication stones and signage from the demolished Workingmen's Hall.

=== Maerdy today ===
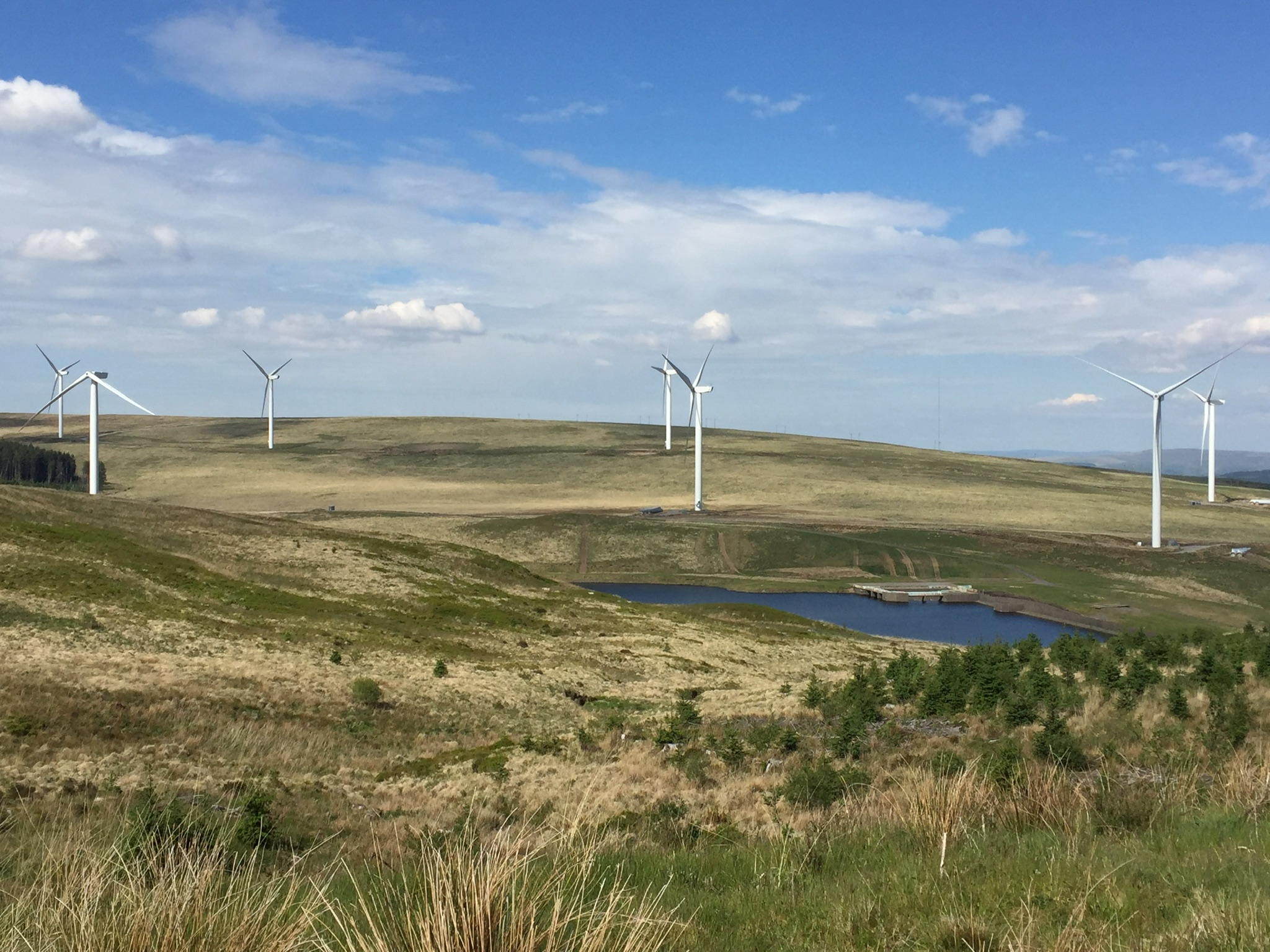
Lluest Wen Reservoir, located on the hills above Maerdy, providing water supply and electricity to the Rhondda Fach .

Today, Maerdy is a post-industrial community with a population of 3,160 as of the 2011 census. The former colliery site now houses the Avon Group factory, which manufactures rubber components for aerosol cans and vehicle gaskets and seals.

The hills surrounding Maerdy have become a significant location for renewable energy development, symbolising the area's transition from coal mining to clean energy generation. An operational 24MW wind farm with eight Siemens turbines is located on Mynydd Maerdy.

Additional wind energy projects are planned for the area. The Welsh Government has proposed the Carreg Wen wind farm as part of its renewable energy strategy, which would feature 18 turbines between Aberdare and Maerdy. These developments contribute to the Welsh Government's target of generating renewable electricity to meet 100% of Wales's needs by 2035.

The community faces contemporary challenges including high unemployment levels (19% inactivity rate), limited transport links, and below-average qualification levels, with 29% of residents over 16 having no formal qualifications.

Community facilities include Maerdy Community Primary School and Maerdy Park. The Community Archives Wales scheme operates a local archive group that preserves the area's historical photographs and documents.

== Governance ==
The Maerdy electoral ward is coterminous with the community and elects one county councillor to Rhondda Cynon Taf County Borough Council. Since 1995 representation has flipped between the Labour Party and Plaid Cymru.

However, a 2018 review of electoral arrangements by the Local Democracy and Boundary Commission for Wales would see Maerdy ward merged with neighbouring Ferndale. The proposals would take effect from the 2022 council elections.

== Transport ==
Between 1849 and 1856, the Taff Vale Railway opened the Maerdy Branch from Porth, including a station at Maerdy. Passenger services were withdrawn in 1964, and the line closed completely in August 1986 after coal from Mardy Colliery was raised through Tower Colliery.

In 2005, RCT council constructed the A4223 Porth and Lower Rhondda Fach Relief Road (Porth Bypass) follows the old railway line through Ynyshir, past Wattstown and on to Pontygwaith. The northern section forms a branch to the Taff Trail cycleway.

== Community Archives Wales ==
A group of interested residents takes part in the Maerdy Archive Group which is affiliated with the Community Archives Wales scheme to teach local residents how to upload articles of their community's history. The group has a large collection of photographs and ephemera about the development and expansion of the Maerdy area.

In 2002 the village was designated as a Communities First Area and a Partnership formed.

== Notable people ==
See Category:People from Maerdy

George Baker (1936–2024) was a Welsh international footballer who played as a forward for Plymouth Argyle and was part of the Wales squad for the 1958 FIFA World Cup.Originally a winger converted to a deep-lying centre-forward, he made 83 appearances for Plymouth Argyle between 1954 and 1959.

Frank Owen of Pentre Road was killed in action at the Battle of Brunete in July 1937 whilst fighting fascism with the International Brigades during the Spanish Civil War.

Lynn Howells (born 1950) is a Welsh rugby union coach who served as assistant coach to Graham Henry with the Wales national rugby union team during the 1999 Rugby World Cup. He coached major clubs including Pontypridd, Cardiff, and the Celtic Warriors, before serving as head coach of the Romania national rugby union team from 2012 to 2018. Originally a flanker, he helped guide Pontypridd to Cup and League Championship successes in 1996 and 1997 as assistant coach.

John Darwin Hinds (1922–1981) was a politician who became Wales's first Black, Muslim councillor in 1958 and later Wales's first Black mayor in 1975. His older sister, Elvira Gwenllian Payne (known as Gwen), was Wales's first Black female councillor. The Hinds family were significant figures in Welsh political history.

Other notable residents include footballers Lee Beach and Haydn Price, rugby league player Ken Rowlands, and former Labour and Change UK Member of Parliament Jon Owen Jones.
