= Ynyshir =

Village and community in Rhondda, Wales

Ynyshir: Welsh: Ynys-hir
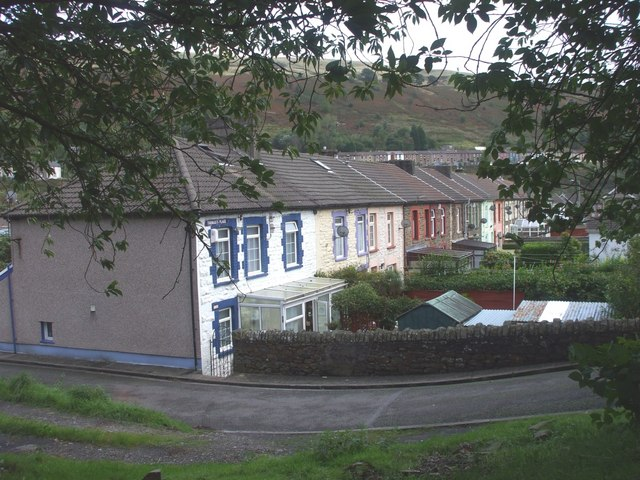

- Location within Rhondda Cynon Taf
- Population: 3,320 (2011 census)
- OS grid reference: ST025925
- Principal area: Rhondda Cynon Taf
- Preserved county: Mid Glamorgan
- Country: Wales
- Sovereign state: United Kingdom
- Post town: PORTH
- Postcode district: CF39
- Dialling code: 01443
- Police: South Wales
- Fire: South Wales
- Ambulance: Welsh
- UK Parliament: Rhondda
- List of places UK Wales Rhondda Cynon Taf 51.622844°N 3.409818°W Community map: Map of the community

Ynyshir (Welsh: [ənɪshiːr]; English pronunciation 'Un-is-heer') is a village and community located in the Rhondda Valley, within Rhondda Cynon Taf, South Wales. The name of the village means "long island" in Welsh and takes its name from a farm in the area, falling within the historic parishes of Ystradyfodwg and Llanwynno (Llanwonno). The community of Ynyshir lies between the small adjoining village of Wattstown and the larger town of neighbouring Porth.

Ynyshir has its own Bakery, doctor's surgery and a number of shops and other significant amenities, although these represent a fraction of the businesses that once fronted the main road – Ynyshir Road during the village's heyday. It is also home to local football teams Ynyshir Albions and Ynyshir and Wattstown Boys Club.

== History ==
Until the mid-19th century Ynyshir was a sparsely populated agricultural area. Then in the 1840s the first deep coal mine was sunk in the village, the first colliery to be opened in the Rhondda Fach valley, and consequently Ynyshir was also the earliest colliery settlement of the valley.

The initial development of the village began along the west bank of the Rhondda Fach river within the parish of Ystradyfodwg on the land occupied by Ynyshir farm, later followed by the development east of the river within the parish of Llanwonno on land owned by Maendy and Penrhiw farms. By 1900 much of the village which is evident today was in place.

In 1841 the Taff Vale Railway reached neighbouring Dinas and with the train came far greater commercial opportunities for prospective colliery owners, with the first section of the Rhondda Fach Branch of the Taff Vale railway being marked by the extension of the railway from Porth and Dinas to Ynyshir in 1849.

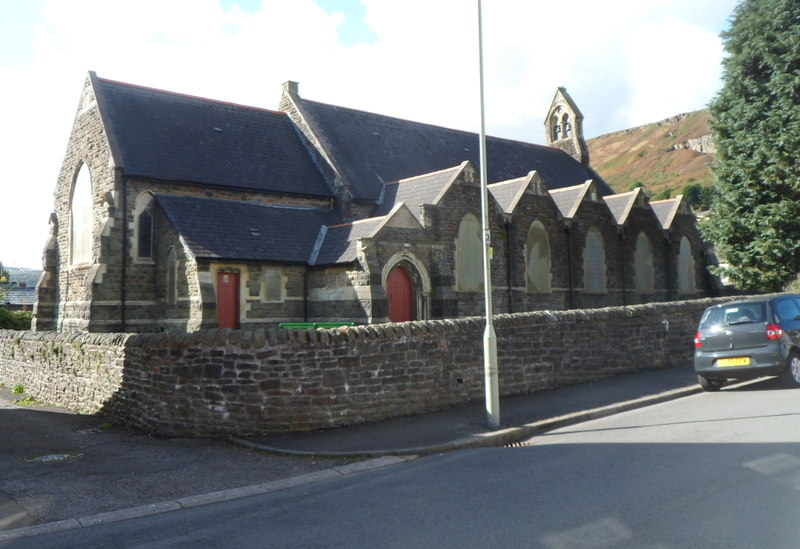
St Anne's Church

Ynyshir was home to several chapels/churches, namely Ainon Chapel (Welsh Baptist), Bethany Chapel (English Baptist), Moriah Chapel (Calvinistic Methodist), St Anne's (Church in Wales), Saron Chapel (Welsh Independent), Ynyshir Welsh Wesleyan Methodist Chapel, Bethel Chapel (Welsh Baptist), Penuel Chapel (English Independent), Tabernacle Chapel (Congregational Methodist) and Ynyshir English Wesleyan Methodist Chapel.

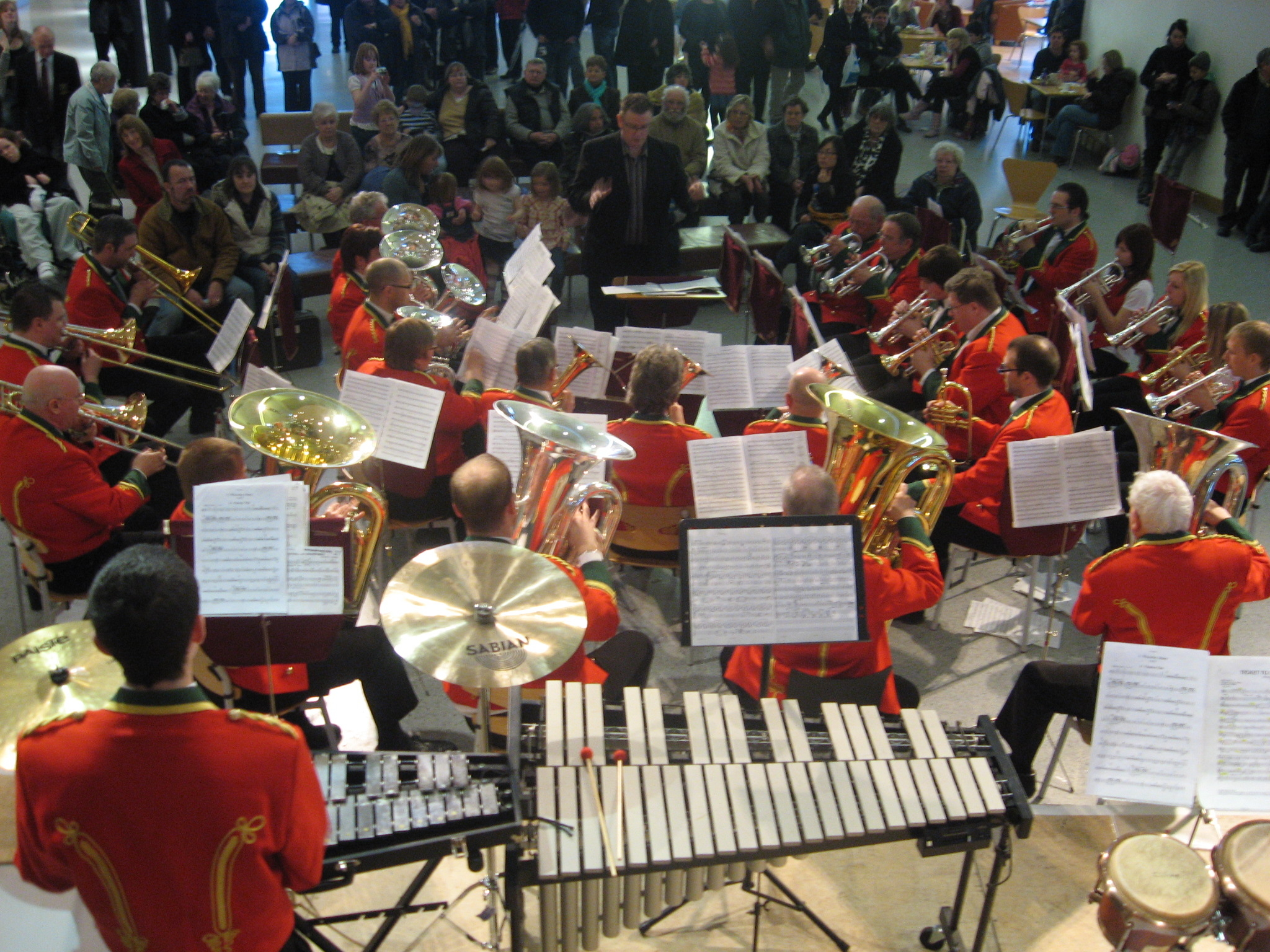
Ynyshir Welfare Band at the Millennium Centre, Cardiff

In 2009 the new modern £5.5 million Ynyshir Community Primary School located on Llanwonno Road was opened; this was to replace the previous Ynyshir Junior School and later in 2010 also replaced the old Ynyshir Infants School off Gynor Place.

== Industrialisation ==
Shepherd and Evans sank the first deep mine in Ynyshir in 1845. The mine was subsequently bought by Francis Crawshay to supply the Crawshay Ironworks in Treforest. The Ynyshir colliery would be followed by the Ynyshir Steam Colliery, Standard 1 pit in 1875 and Standard 2 pit in 1876 and then in 1904 the Lady Lewis opened, which was later connected underground to the Lewis Merthyr Consolidated Collieries (today the Rhondda Heritage Park) at Hafod (Trehafod).

In 1896, local twins the Lewis brothers invented carbonated soft-drink Lurvills Delight, the profits from which allowed 150 local mining families to emigrate to the United States. Production ceased in 1910, due a local shortage of dock leaves.

== Governance ==
An Ynyshir electoral ward existed and was coterminous with the borders of the Ynyshir community. It elected one county councillor to Rhondda Cynon Taf County Borough Council. Since 1995 representation had flipped between the Labour Party and Plaid Cymru. At the May 2017 election Plaid Cymru won the contest.

A 2018 review of electoral arrangements by the Local Democracy and Boundary Commission for Wales would see Ynyshir merged with neighbouring Tylorstown to create a new 'Tylorstown and Ynyshir' ward. The proposals would take effect from the 2022 council elections.

== Transport ==
Between 1849 and 1856, the Taff Vale Railway opened the Maerdy Branch from Porth, including a station at Ynyshir. Passenger services were withdrawn in 1964, and the line closed completely and was lifted from June 1986 after coal from Mardy Colliery was raised through Tower Colliery.

In 2005, RCT council constructed the A4223 Porth and Lower Rhondda Fach Relief Road (Porth Bypass), which follows the old Rhondda Fach branch railway line through Ynyshir, past Wattstown and on to Pontygwaith. Its construction has meant a significant decrease in traffic flows through the village.
