= Rhondda by-pass =

Road in Rhondda Cynon Taf, Wales, UK

Coordinates: 51°36′52″N 3°24′37″W

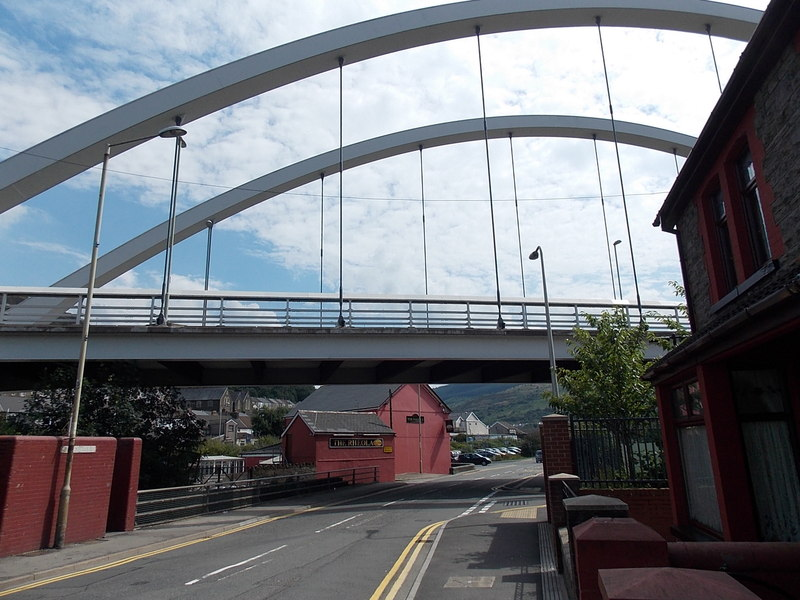
Rheola Bridge on the by-pass at Porth

The Rhondda by-pass, also known as the Porth and Lower Rhondda Fach Relief Road, is a relief road running through the Rhondda, a valley in South Wales. It is built partly on the former Maerdy Branch of the Rhondda Line and a former branch line to Cymmer Colliery.

The road runs from Trehafod at the eastern edge of the Rhondda to Pontygwaith in the Rhondda Fach via Porth. The route includes the Rheola Bridge, which crosses near the point the Rhondda Fawr and Rhondda Fach divide. It opened in December 2006, and a plaque commemorating the road was unveiled by the First Minister for Wales, Rhodri Morgan, the following year. Local residents have complained about the noise on the road, as the imposing local geography of the Rhondda means it has to pass as close as 40 feet (12 m) to residential streets.
