= Pontygwaith Halt railway station =

Former railway station in Wales

Pontygwaith Halt

General information
- Location: Pontygwaith, Rhondda Cynon Taf; Wales
- Coordinates: 51.6414°N 3.4317°W
- Grid reference: ST012939
- Platforms: 1

Other information
- Status: Disused

History
- Original company: Taff Vale Railway

Key dates
- 5 June 1905: Opened
- 1 October 1914: Closed
Location

Pontygwaith Halt railway station served the village of Pontygwaith in South Wales. It was only open for nine years.

== History and description ==
Located midway between Wattstown Platform and Tylorstown, the halt had a ground-level platform and an enclosure housing a shelter. The gates were kept locked until a train arrived and the conductor unlocked them. The halt closed in 1914.

== After closure ==
Over a century after closure, there is little to show the existence of the halt. The site is little more than an open grassed space, grazed by sheep. The road bridge remains, though is now heavily defaced with graffiti.

| Preceding station | Disused railways | Following station |
|---|---|---|
| Wattstown Platform; Line & station closed | Taff Vale Railway; Maerdy Branch | Tylorstown; Line and station closed |
