= Community Archives Wales =

Community Archives Wales (CAW) is a website of digital content created and maintained by a number of community heritage groups from across Wales. The initiative for the project came from a partnership between lead partner Culturenet Cymru, a not-for-profit enterprise arm of the National Library of Wales and Glamorgan Archives, Swansea University Archives, South Wales Miners' Library and West Glamorgan Archive Service. The original project ran from 2007 to 2008 with funding from Communities@One, an initiative of the Communities First programme in Wales.

== Purpose ==
Digital community archives are collections of material in private hands that have been digitised and interpreted by community groups, enabling the communities to present their own history in their own words.

Community Archives Wales was a 2-year pilot project to enable eleven groups within Communities First areas throughout Wales to create their own digital archives and share them on the CAW website. Funded by Communities First - the Welsh Assembly Government's flagship programme to improve the living conditions and prospects for people in the most disadvantaged communities in Wales, the project employed 4 members of staff. It started in January 2007 and the first phase ended in December 2008. The website was launched at the National Assembly for Wales in June 2008. The project was overseen by a board of peers including County Archivists and archive professionals from different regions of Wales. Since the end of this phase of the project, the community archive groups have continued to web mount images themselves onto the site, the sustainability of which was always one of the project goals. Other groups from within Wales have also provided images for the site since the beginning of 2009.

== Digital archive groups ==
Community Archives Wales is working with 11 different communities throughout Wales. They are;
Treftadaeth Brynaman Heritage
Bonymaen Communities First Group
Port Talbot History Society
Cwmaman - St Joseph's Heritage Group
Troedyrhiw Environment Forum
Ystalyfera Heritage
Machen Remembered
Maerdy Archive Group
Cymdeithas Hanes Tregaron
Nantlle and Drws y Coed History Society
Cofnodion Cwmystwyth
