= Rhydspence Inn =

Pub in Brilley, Herefordshire, England

Coordinates: 52.119°N 3.107°W

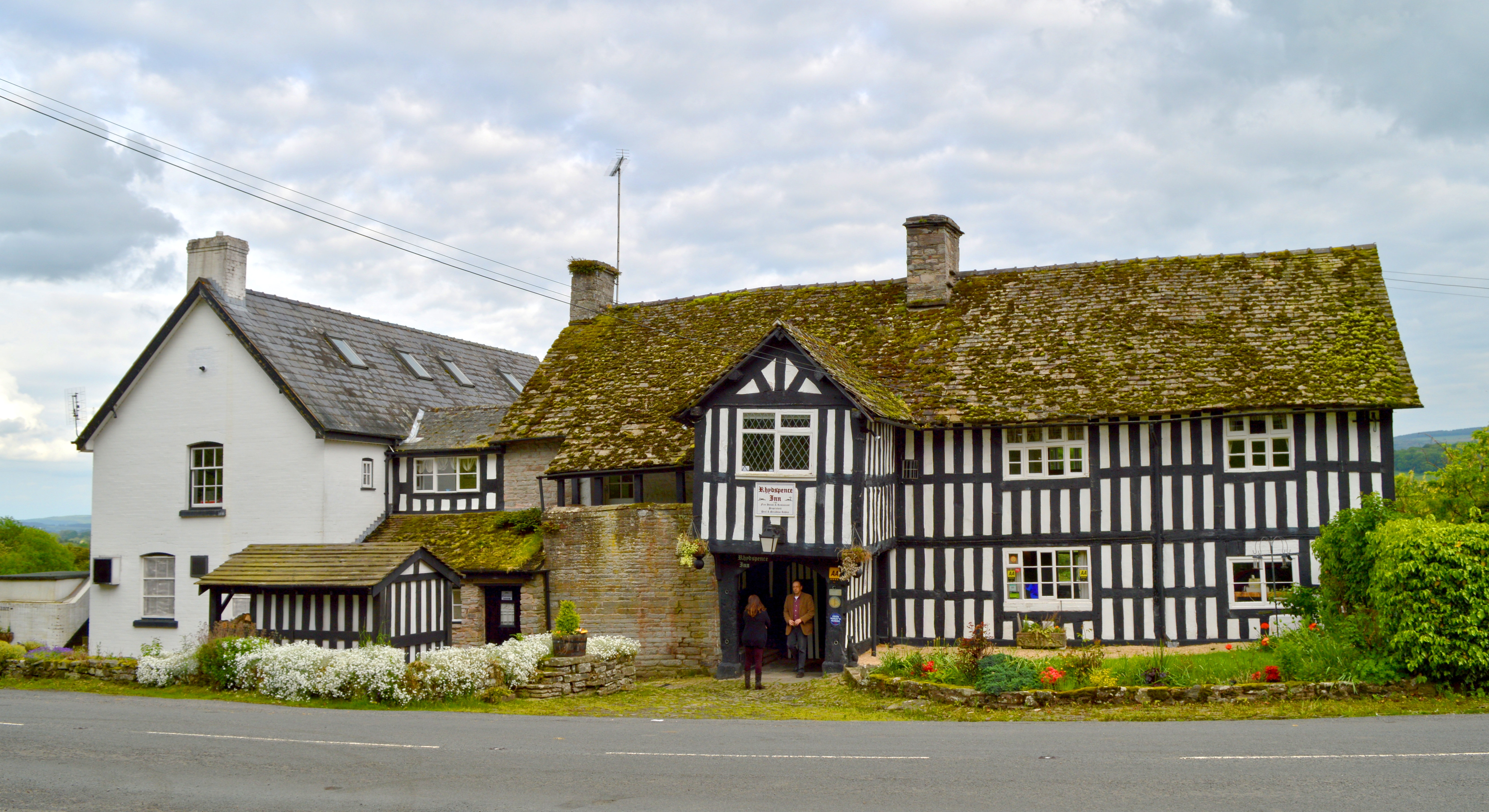
The Rhydspence Inn (2014)

The Rhydspence Inn is a 14th-century inn situated on the Wales-England border and within the Wye Valley overlooking the Welsh hills and Herefordshire countryside. According to English Heritage it was built in the 16th century with 19th and late 20th century additions. It is a former gentry house and was not built as an inn.

== History of the building ==
The proprietors' web site asserts that the Rhydspence Inn was probably always a hostelry. the building dating from 1380 with extensions built in the 17th and 20th centuries. Although no records document these claims, the style of building, size and location suggest the original inn was built for travellers and pilgrims on the medieval route from Abbey Cwmhir to Hereford Cathedral (now part of the Cistercian Way). The land between Rhydspence and Pencesty was called 'La Speys' and was attached to Abbey Cwmhir, which was located about 5 miles (8.0 km) north of Llandrindod Wells. Until well into the sixteenth century droving on any scale in the Marches was far too risky. In such a lonely and lawless area, cattle rustling was rife, often by the authorities themselves. The Land of Speis means simply land of thorn bushes, which it is. The name is still in use today. Abbey Cwmhir was always a modest house, the monks were predominately Welsh and apart from the Abbey's officers would have little occasion to leave it.

Comparison with similar buildings suggests the inn was built by the Vaughn family of Hergest; of whom the best known for his infamous deeds is Thomas, The Black Vaughn. He is said to haunt Kington church by riding his charger down the nave dressed in full armour.

The house was originally of a hall house design, being two-storey at one end and a large open hall area with central open fire, it had a thatched roof. Changes have taken place over the centuries and it is now two storeys throughout with a stone tile roof.

In 1590, two generations after the dissolution of the monasteries, the tenant was Thomas Watkins, and it is likely that at this time the ecclesiastical hostelry had become a stopover for the Welsh and Irish drovers. The Rhydspence became the main assembly point for cattle on the 'Black Ox Trail' (the origins of Lloyds Bank) with beasts coming on drovers roads from Southern Ireland, South and Mid Wales.

== Origin of the name ==
Attached to the inn were some 140 acres (0.57 km^{2}) of land and it is probable that from this time that the inn gained the name Rhydspence. Rhyd means 'River Crossing', not necessarily a bridge, in this case a ford as the inn is located near to a point where the River Wye can easily be forded, in summer at least, furthest east along the river and free from toll. Spence is possibly a corruption of 'Pence' as the land was split into penny, Halfpenny and Farthing Fields; these were let to the drovers to rest and revitalise the livestock before forming herds for the drive to the English cities and markets as far as London.

== Drovers ==
There are many stories about the Drovers, whose role existed for a period of three to four hundred years. Experiments with shoeing cattle, leather boots for sheep and bitumen on the feet of geese are often mentioned. Initially a 'herd' would have been about 12 cattle every day to London because only 12 cattle were required at Smithfield market. Similarly herds would be dispatched daily to Oxford, Gloucester, Worcester and the like. A small herd was not likely to be entirely lost to Highwaymen and no cash was carried. Hence the reference to the early origins of Lloyds Bank as monies could be transferred along the trail 'on the hoof' with minimum risk and this was the origin of today's Lloyds Banking Group in Wales (formerly The Bank of the Black Ox but now known as the Bank of the Black Horse). In later years the herds became bigger and eventually a railhead with stockyards was built in Kington and the Rhydspence was no longer needed by the cattle trade.

Today the Offa's Dyke Path, the Cistercian Way and the Wye Valley Walk pass close by the inn.

== Location ==
The Rhydspence Inn is on the English side of the Welsh Border, the stream in the garden marks the divide.

== Past owners ==
A Buskin Shirley and a William Colley were the owner and innkeeper from 1783. A ten shilling 'Licence for the Purveying of Liquor' was issued in 1830 to a John Morris, proprietor and John Watkins, owner. Sarah Ann Clark, the landlady and wife of Philip Clark was murdered in 1880. Her ghost is said to haunt the inn; allegedly she is very friendly and only appears when there are young children staying at the inn. The Rhydspence continued into the 1950s as an inn and farm when the land was sold off and the Inn progressed from an alehouse into the hotel and restaurant of today.
