= Wattstown Platform railway station =

Former railway station in Wales

Wattstown Platform

General information
- Location: Wattstown, Rhondda Cynon Taf; Wales
- Coordinates: 51.6326°N 3.4152°W
- Grid reference: ST022936
- Platforms: 1

Other information
- Status: Disused

History
- Original company: Taff Vale Railway

Key dates
- 5 June 1905: Opened
- 12 July 1920: Closed
Location

Wattstown Platform railway station was a short-lived railway station on the now-disused Maerdy Branch in South Wales.

== History and description ==
The Wattstown goods depot opened in 1885, but a passenger facility did not follow until 1905. The station was not successful, and closed after just fifteen years. Goods activities continued until 7 October 1963. No trace of the station remains, with the trackbed having been used for the construction of the A4233.

The site of the goods depot (ST019937) is now occupied by a builder's merchant.

Preceding station	Disused railways	Following station
Ynyshir; Line & station closed	Taff Vale Railway; Maerdy Branch	Pontygwaith Halt; Line and station closed
