= Pontygwaith, Rhondda Cynon Taf =

Coordinates: 51.637676°N 3.430264°W

Pontygwaith: Welsh: Pont-y-gwaith
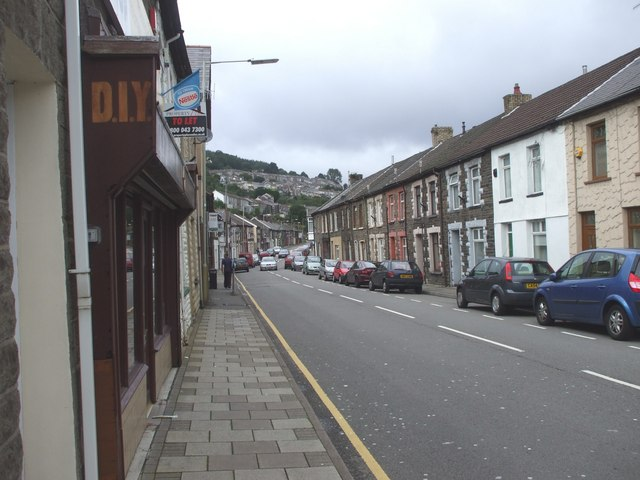

- Location within Rhondda Cynon Taf
- OS grid reference: ST011941
- Principal area: Rhondda Cynon Taf
- Preserved county: Mid Glamorgan
- Country: Wales
- Sovereign state: United Kingdom
- Post town: Ferndale
- Postcode district: CF43
- Dialling code: 01443
- Police: South Wales
- Fire: South Wales
- Ambulance: Welsh
- UK Parliament: Rhondda
- Senedd Cymru – Welsh Parliament: Rhondda

Pontygwaith (Welsh language: "Bridge of work" or "Bridge of the Ironworks") is a small village located in the Rhondda Fach valley in the county borough of Rhondda Cynon Taf, Wales, in the community of Tylorstown.

== History ==
Pontygwaith takes its name from a blast furnace built in the early 16th century, though by 1863 it was described as a shapeless ruin The location of the furnace was at the north end of what today is Furnace Road and the only documented proof of the structure is in a contract drawn up in 1614 between John Hanbury of Pontypool and Richard ap Rhys of Llantrisant for the supply of charcoal to the "furnace of Penrees" (Penrhys).

Elfed Davies, Labour Party Member of Parliament for Rhondda East 1959-74 and who went on to become elevated to the Peerage as Lord Davies of Penrhys, was born at Fenwick Street, Pontygwaith.

Pontygwaith was the birthplace of composer Mansel Thomas OBE (1909 – 1986).

== Transport ==
Between 1849 and 1856, the Taff Vale Railway opened the Maerdy Branch from Porth, including a station at Pontygwaith Halt. Passenger services were withdrawn from Pontygwaith Halt in 1914 but passenger services continued along the line until 1964. The line closed completely after the last train in August 1986 after coal from Mardy Colliery was raised through Tower Colliery. Since 2005, the southern section from Porth to Pontygwaith is now the A4223 Porth and Lower Rhondda Fach Relief Road (Porth Bypass). The upper section including the section passing Pontygwaith has become a branch of the Taff Trail cycleway.
