= Tylorstown =

Tylorstown: Welsh: Pendyrus
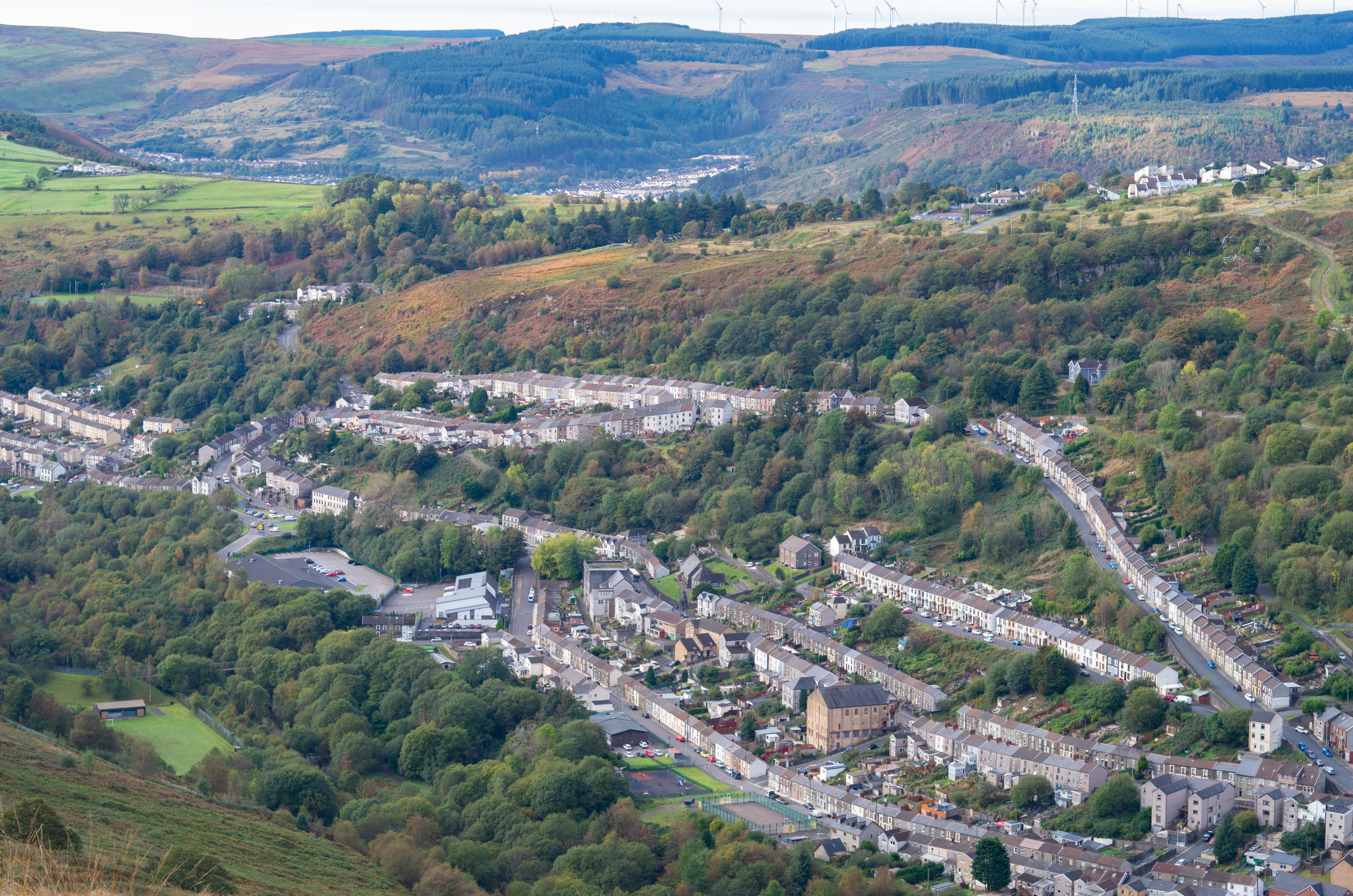

- Location within Rhondda Cynon Taf
- Population: 4,546 (2011))
- OS grid reference: SS955965
- Principal area: Rhondda Cynon Taf
- Preserved county: Mid Glamorgan
- Country: Wales
- Sovereign state: United Kingdom
- Post town: Ferndale
- Postcode district: CF43
- Dialling code: 01443
- Police: South Wales
- Fire: South Wales
- Ambulance: Welsh
- UK Parliament: Rhondda and Ogmore
- Senedd Cymru – Welsh Parliament: Rhondda
- List of places UK Wales Rhondda Cynon Taf 51.6494°N 3.4395°W Community map: Map of the community

Tylorstown (Welsh: Pendyrus) is a village and community located in the Rhondda valley, in the county borough of Rhondda Cynon Taf, Wales. It is neighboured by the villages of Blaenllechau, Ferndale, Penrhys, Pontygwaith and Stanleytown.

== History ==
By the mid-19th century, the potential wealth of the South Wales Coalfield was unapparent to many, but provided great opportunities to those with the resources and knowledge to exploit it. London geologist Alfred Tylor came to the area and purchased the mineral rights from Pendyrus Farm in 1872. Tylor soon opened Pendyrys Colliery on the site. The Colliery workers and their families were housed near the colliery on the former farmland, this area retained its name in Welsh (Pendyrus) but would come to be known as Tylor's Town in English.

In January 1896, 57 miners were killed by an underground explosion in the Tylorstown pits, newly taken over by the Ferndale Colliery; the blast was so powerful it blew the winding gear off the top of the pitshaft. Research on the causes of the fatalities in the Tylorstown disaster conducted by Prof John Scott Haldane was instrumental in the introduction of canaries to detect the presence of carbon monoxide in mines.

The last working mine in the village closed in the 1960s setting off a long period of economic decline which worsened following the 1984–85 national miners' strike which resulted in pits in nearby locations such as Maerdy closing. The local passenger train line closed in 1964 following the Beeching Axe which also limited the prospects of easy commuting to Cardiff.

In December 2006, the Rhondda by-pass, also known as the Porth relief road, opened. It terminates at neighbouring Pontygwaith due to the topography of the Rhondda Fach, which is a narrow valley with steep sides and limited flat land on the valley floor. The new road cost £98 million, included the construction or replacement of 11 bridges, including the Rheola Bridge. An engineering success, the road has done much to reduce traffic congestion and improve local economic prospects.

== Landmarks ==
The Welfare Hall was built in 1933 from red brick and stone in the French Baroque style. It is the last remaining miners' institute in the Rhondda Valley, and is now run as a community hub putting on shows, classes and a coffee shop by volunteers. In 2017 it was awarded £500,000 to renovate the building. In 2025 the National Lottery Heritage Fund granted the building £5m for the renovation & preservation of the building, with works commencing in 2026

The Holy Trinity Church, situated on a mound above the main road was built in 1882–3 by E.M. Bruce Vaughan. It features a five-light plate traceried west window and a stained glass window of Christ in Majesty made by monks of Prinknash Abbey in around 1980. There is a monument to Reverend John Rees who died in 1913.

There is also a Conservative Club, which has been renovated and adapted into the ACTS Church.

The Workingmen's Club was a large building, which had fallen into disrepair and was set alight by vandals in 2022, resulting in its demolition.

The Diamond Jubilee Hotel is located at the bottom of Penrhys Road, having been a pub, hotel and Chinese restaurant. In 2007, a raid was carried out and a £1m a year cannabis growing operation was discovered, believed to be one of the largest found in Wales at the time. As at 2024, the site remains in disrepair, following refusal of planning permission for a care home.

The cemetery, situated halfway up the hill to Penrhys features a chapel built in 1884 by W.H. Jenkins and T.R. Phillips.

The Rhondda Fach Sports Centre is located in Tylorstown, featuring a gym, squash court & various other fitness facilities. The swimming pool in the centre was removed to create a large gym & fitness space.

== Tylorstown coal tip ==
In the wake of Storm Dennis on 16 February 2020, a slip occurred at the Llanwonno coal tip on the slopes of Cefn Gwyngul east of Tylorstown. This event led to the checking of other tips to ensure no more slips could occur and led to the establishment of a joint task force, the "Coal Tip Safety Taskforce" by the Welsh and UK governments. The latter provided £2.5 million in October 2020 to clean up the site of the slip, which involved the cleaning up of 60000 tonnes of collapsed material, which started in June 2020.

== Governance ==
The Tylorstown electoral ward was coterminous with the borders of the Tylorstown community and elected two county councillors to Rhondda Cynon Taf County Borough Council. Since 1995 representation had mainly been by the Labour Party but the ward had a Plaid Cymru councillor from 1999 to 2004.

A 2018 review of electoral arrangements by the Local Democracy and Boundary Commission for Wales would see Tylorstown merged with neighbouring Ynyshir to form 'Tylorstown and Ynyshir'. The proposals would take effect from the 2022 council elections.

== Sport ==
Tylorstown has a rugby union team called Tylorstown Tigers. The club produced a British and Irish Lions rugby union player John Bevan who toured New Zealand in 1971 with the only Lions side to win a series in that country. The club also has a very successful women's side the Tigresses who won the Welsh national women's cup in season 2005 to 2006 and were runners up in the national league. The women's side has provided many internationals to the Wales women's team. The club has also supplied an international and first class rugby coach in Lyn Howells.

The village was also home to world boxing champion Jimmy Wilde, the "ghost with a hammer in his hand".

Although located close to the border with Penrhys, there is a Bowling green in Tylorstown. The Green is located in Penrhys Park, situated near Tylorstown Rugby Club, and is home to Penrhys Park Bowls Club. The team is small yet competitive. Only 2 members of the club has ever represented Wales's outdoor international team, L I Williams & Trevor Humphreys, father of Gareth Humphreys. Gareth is also very vocal of the fact that Penrhys Park is where his bowls journey began back in 1945.

== Appearances in popular culture ==
Some scenes for the Sky TV comedy Stella were filmed in Tylorstown, and an aerial view of the village appears in the title sequence. The 2019 film Denmark starring Rafe Spall features a scene in Brynhyfryd, an unusually steep street of terraced houses in Tylorstown.

== Notable people ==
See Category:People from Tylorstown

- John Williams – Australian politician, born in Tylorstown.
- John Bevan (rugby) – Welsh International Rugby Player & British Lion, born in Tylorstown.
- Jimmy Wilde - World boxing champion, grew up in Tylorstown.
- Gareth Jones – "founding father" of the English law of restitution and former Professor of Law at Cambridge University.
- Steve Jones (Welsh presenter) – TV presenter. He is best known as the presenter of Channel 4's former teen schedule T4 (Channel 4). In the United States, he is best known as the host of the first season of The X Factor USA.
- Bob Prosser – Welsh rugby union and rugby league footballer who played in the 1960s and 1970s, born in Tylorstown.
- Sybil Williams – Welsh actress, producer, nightclub owner, socialite - first wife of Richard Burton. Born in Tylorstown.
- Rob Page – former professional footballer for Wales and manager of the Wales national football team.
- Gareth Humphreys MBE – Former Welsh international bowls player, commonwealth competitor and world champion. Former Welsh bowls selector and team manager. Recipient of MBE in the 2009 Queen's Birthday Honours for Voluntary Services to Lawn Bowls. Born and raised in Tylorstown.
