= Frank Owen (International Brigades) =

Welsh miner and International Brigades volunteer (died 1937)

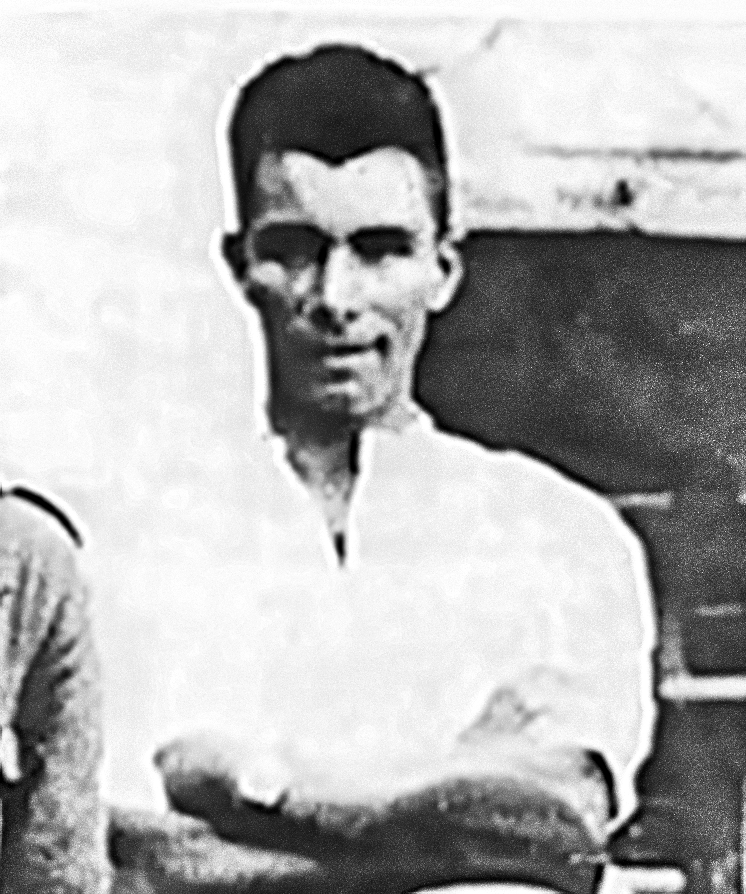
- Born: c. 1910-1915; Maerdy, Rhondda, Wales
- Died: July 1937; Brunete, Spain
- Cause of death: Killed in action during the Battle of Brunete
- Military career
- Allegiance: Spanish Republic
- Branch: International Brigades
- Unit: British Battalion
- Conflicts: Spanish Civil War; Battle of Brunete

Frank Owen (c. 1910–1915 - July 1937) was a Welsh coal miner and communist activist from Maerdy who volunteered to fight with the International Brigades during the Spanish Civil War. A resident of Pentre Road in Maerdy, Owen was killed in action during the Battle of Brunete in July 1937 whilst serving with the British Battalion of the XV International Brigade.

== Early life and background ==
Frank Owen was born in Maerdy, a village in the Rhondda Fach Valley in South Wales. Maerdy became synonymous with working class syndicalism and solidarity in the mid-twentieth century and was associated with the Communist Party of Great Britain and radical miners' leaders such as Arthur Horner, earning it the nickname "Little Moscow".

Like many young men in the area, Owen worked as a coal miner and became involved in left-wing politics. He was a member of the Communist Party of Great Britain and lived on Pentre Road in Maerdy with his family.

== Spanish Civil War service ==
When the Spanish Civil War erupted in July 1936, Owen was amongst the approximately 175-200 volunteers from Wales who enlisted in the International Brigades to fight Franco's forces. He volunteered to join the British Battalion, which was formally known as the Saklatvala Battalion but was commonly referred to by its more popular name.

Owen arrived in Spain and was assigned to the British Battalion, part of the XV International Brigade. Welsh miners made up one of the largest contingents within the British Battalion of the International Brigades, bringing with them a political tradition unique in Britain in its combination of trade union militancy, radical extra-parliamentary activity and internationalism. The British Battalion mustered 331 brigaders for the Battle of Brunete, having been reinforced by new recruits and strengthened by returnees from hospital following their devastating losses at the Battle of Jarama earlier in 1937.

=== Death during the Battle of Brunete ===
In July 1937, Owen took part in the Battle of Brunete, a major Republican offensive designed to relieve pressure on the northern front and break through Nationalist lines west of Madrid.

On 6 July, the British Battalion moved towards their objective, the heavily defended village of Villanueva de la Cañada, where they were pinned down by well-directed machine-gun fire. The village was eventually captured at midnight, but the battalion faced continued fierce resistance as they advanced towards their objective.

During the battle, Jack 'Russia' Roberts came across Frank Owen's body perched against a tree next to the riverbed whilst desperately searching for water himself.

== Legacy and commemoration ==
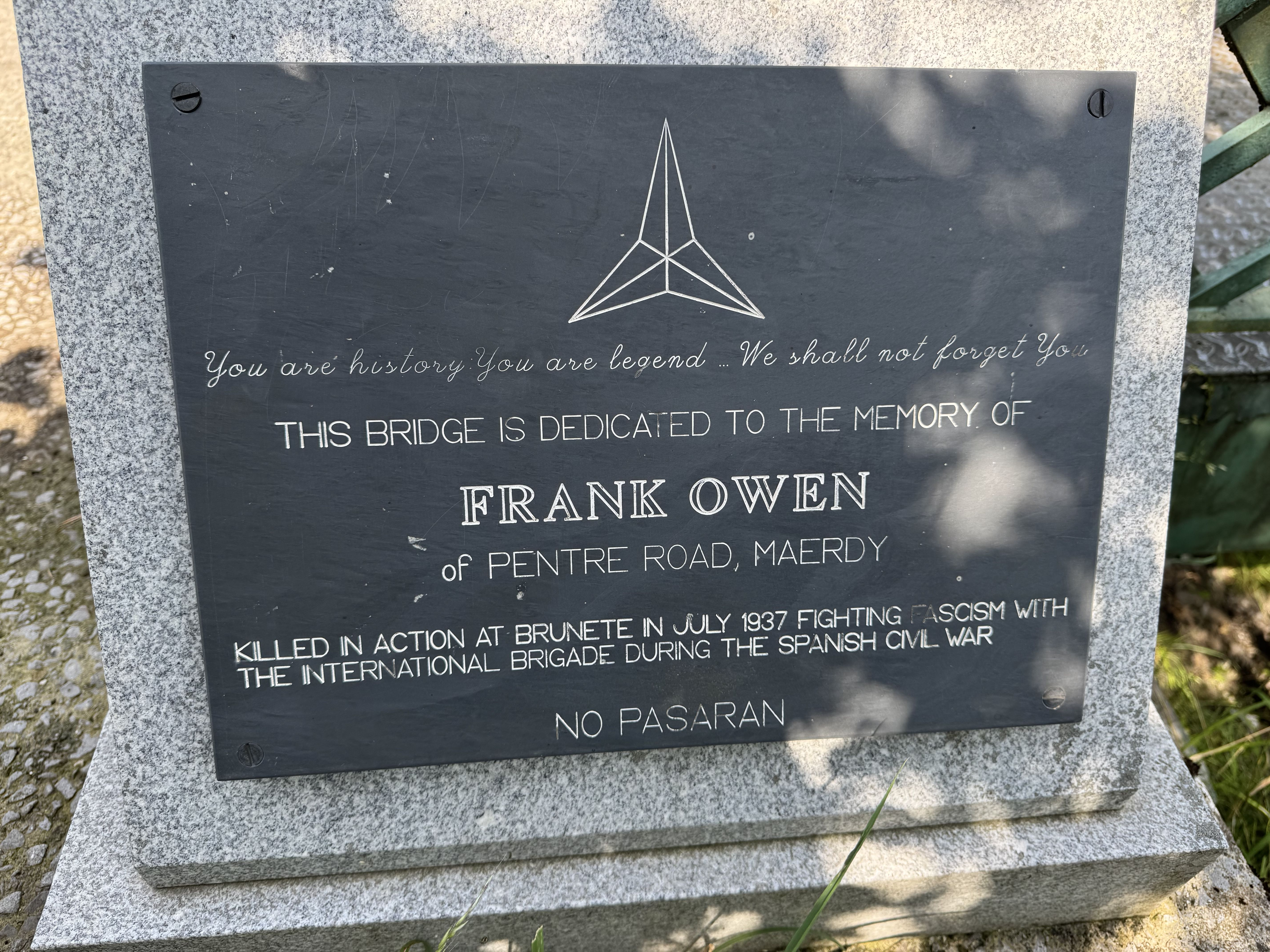
The Frank Owen memorial, commemorating Owen's sacrifice during the Spanish Civil War

A memorial bridge was constructed near the Avon factory in Maerdy dedicated to Frank Owen's memory. The memorial plaque contains the International Brigades emblem and commemorates Owen's sacrifice during the Spanish Civil War.

The original plaque was damaged by target practice and was later replaced by a slate tablet on a granite plinth in 2009. The memorial was unveiled in 2000 by Lance Rogers and rededicated in August 2009.
