= Communities First =

Government initiative in Wales

Communities First was a Welsh Government programme aimed at reducing poverty. The programme was community focused and supported the most disadvantaged people in the most deprived areas of Wales with the aim of contributing to alleviating persistent poverty.

== History ==
The original Communities First Programme was launched in 2001 as the flagship Welsh Government Programme to tackle poverty in the most disadvantaged areas in Wales. In its first decade the programme was delivered principally through over 150 local partnerships. These were concentrated mainly in the cities, valleys and coastal towns, with at least one in each of the 22 unitary authorities of Wales.

Following consultation in 2011, the then Minister for Local Government and Communities, Carl Sargeant, announced that from April 2012 the Communities First Programme would become a Community Focussed Tackling Poverty Programme. There was an increased emphasis on ensuring that the programme supported the most vulnerable people living in deprived areas.

A cabinet statement was published on the Welsh government's website on 19 April 2018 officially recognising the closure of the programme. The phasing out of the programme was carried out by proposing to local authorities ways in which the legacy funds for the project could be used.

== The programme ==
In its final instantiation it was based on fewer, larger areas than previously, each covering a population of, on average, 10-15,000 people, known as Communities First Clusters. Each cluster was focussed around areas among the 10% most deprived in Wales according to the Welsh Index of Multiple Deprivation (WIMD) 2011.

There were 52 Communities First Clusters which between them included all the communities which were eligible for inclusion in the programme.

Each Cluster was managed by a Lead Delivery Body (LDB) responsible for ensuring that the programme was well managed, that funding was used to deliver agreed outcomes and that communities were fully involved.

Each Cluster had a Community Involvement Plan to ensure that local people and community organisations played a full part in the programme and were kept fully informed of its activities. There was greater flexibility than in the past for each cluster to develop the structures that suit the area, rather than following a single standard model for all.

Each Cluster also had a delivery plan to show how its work contributes to the three strategic outcomes. A new Communities First Outcomes Framework was developed to provide a much clearer picture of what was being achieved by each Cluster and by the programme overall.

== Programme support ==
The Communities First Programme was supported by a National Support Programme with three elements.

The Training and Support service delivered advice and training courses to help the Communities First Clusters, including staff and volunteers, to meet their objectives and improve their effectiveness in tackling poverty in their communities. The service was delivered by the Wales Council for Voluntary Action (WCVA).

The Workforce Development programme ensured that there were plans in place to meet the needs of Communities First and other community development programmes in Wales in the future. This work was led by Community Development Cymru, working closely with education providers, employers and other agencies with relevant expertise.

The Media Support service worked with Clusters to help them promote their work and achievements in all forms of media, including the internet, print, and audio visual. The service also delivered national and regional Communities First conferences.
