= Penrhys =

Coordinates: 51.645966°N 3.440613°W

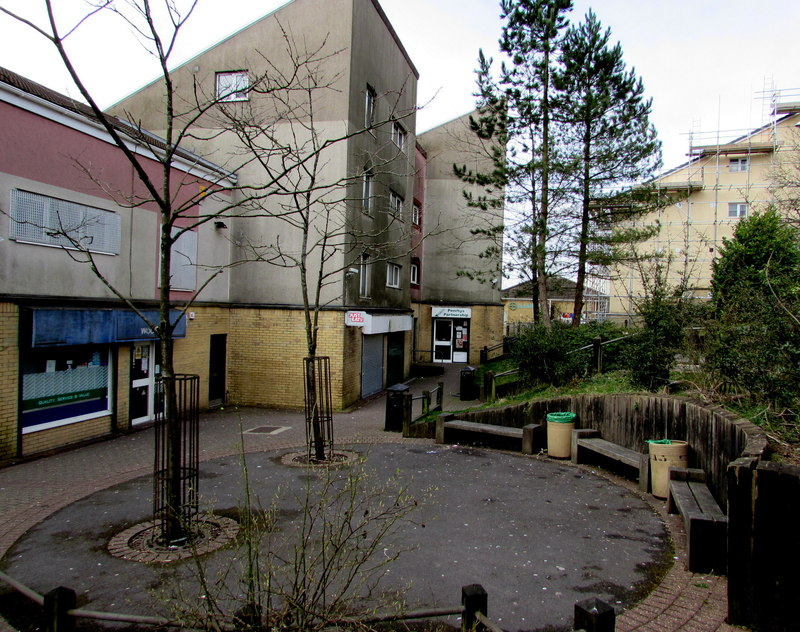
- Y Ffynon Centre

- Location within Rhondda Cynon Taf
- OS grid reference: ST004951
- Principal area: Rhondda Cynon Taf
- Preserved county: Mid Glamorgan
- Country: Wales
- Sovereign state: United Kingdom
- Post town: Ferndale
- Postcode district: CF43
- Dialling code: 01443
- Police: South Wales
- Fire: South Wales
- Ambulance: Welsh
- UK Parliament: Rhondda and Ogmore
- Senedd Cymru – Welsh Parliament: Afan Ogwr Rhondda

Penrhys is a village in the county borough of Rhondda Cynon Taf, Wales, situated on a hillside overlooking both valleys of Rhondda Fawr and Rhondda Fach. It is situated around 1,100 ft above sea level and is a district of Tylorstown. Until the late 16th century and once again since Catholic Emancipation in 1829, Penrhys has been an important Christian pilgrimage site.

The site of Penrhys has a rich religious history dating back to medieval times, though few settlements other than farmsteads can be traced to the area. Penrhys is significant for a medieval monastery, the shrine of "Our Lady" built at the holy well of Ffynnon Fair. During the early 16th century the antiquarian John Leland wrote during his visit to the area that he saw "Penrise Village, where the Pilgrimage was", suggesting that a settlement had built up in the area. In 1538 the shrine was destroyed during the English Reformation, and the area appeared to fall into decline. With the arrival of industrialisation in the Rhondda Valley during the 19th century interest in the religious history of Penrhys increased. An archaeological dig at the old chapel was carried out in 1912 and a new statue of the Virgin Mary was unveiled in 1953. In February 1927 the first burial took place at Penrhys cemetery.

== History ==
=== Early history ===
Three Bronze Age funerary sites have been identified in the locality of Penrhys, with the cemetery at Erw Beddau (English: Acre of graves), also associated with a latter battle between Iestyn ap Gwrgant and Rhys ap Tewdwr (c. 1085–88).

The community was named Pen-Rhys-ap-Tewdwr (English: Rhys ap Tewdwr's Head), and a variety of traditions record Rhys ap Tewdwr of Deheubarth as the original eponym of the later monastery and village. Since at least the 15th century, one tradition has recorded that following the battle of Hirwaun Wrgant Rhys was pursued into the Rhondda by Iestyn ap Gwrgant, King of Glamorgan and that Rhys was either beheaded at the site, or that his head was interred there. The Norman forces that assisted Iestyn are later said to have overthrown him as King of Glamorgan, and divide the lowlands of his kingdom amongst themselves.

Penrhys is often listed as one of the Monastic granges belonging to the Cistercian Llantarnam Abbey, but Penrhys is also said to have been established by Henry I of England or his son, Robert, 1st Earl of Gloucester, and the earliest documentation of the site (a land grant of 1203) refers to Penrhys as 'a manor'.

=== Centre of Pilgrimage ===
In the medieval period the area became an important pilgrimage centre, known for Ffynnon Fair (English: Mary's Well), a holy well that still exists. Its chapel, shrine and hostelry were created to accommodate the large number of pilgrims.

Penrhys was a pilgrimage site until the Dissolution of the Monasteries in the 16th century, when the shrine was dismantled and its Statue of the Virgin taken to London where it was destroyed.

=== Industrial Penrhys ===
In 1904 the mining population of Rhondda was over 110,000 and still expanding rapidly. Although a 'fever hospital' had been constructed in nearby Ystrad, the threat of smallpox had become a concern to the Medical Officer of Health, who recommended a separate containment site. In 1906 the Health Committee purchased three acres of land at Penrhys, chosen for its accessibility to both Rhondda valleys and its distance from other habitable buildings. The smallpox hospital was completed in 1907 and at first served the Rhondda and later all of South Wales. In the 1970s the building was deemed unnecessary and was burnt to the ground by the South Wales Fire Service in 1971.

In 1927 Penrhys was chosen as the starting point for 'Red Sunday in Rhondda Valley' hunger march. The march was organised by the South Wales Miners' Federation and the Rhondda District, but lost support due to opposition from the TUC. It was supported by the Communist party and the march went ahead supported by 270 marchers.

=== Modern Village ===
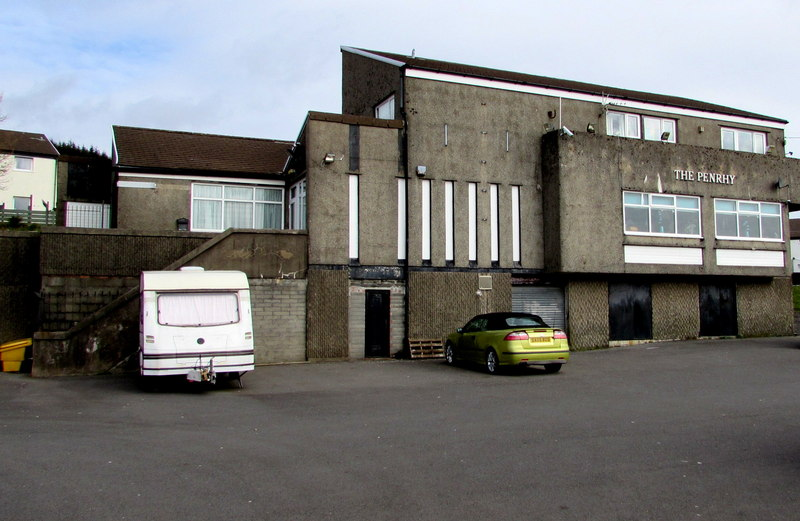
The Penrhys Public House

The village of Penrhys that exists today was first developed in 1966 as a new modern council housing development. Built between 1966 and 1969 by Alex Robertson, Peter Francis & Partners, the houses consisted of short two and three storey terraces with cement rendered concrete walls and monopitch roofs. When it was officially opened in 1968, it consisted of 951 houses, at the time the largest public sector housing venture in Wales.

One of the innovative features of Penrhys village was the district heating system; under an agreement with the National Coal Board, water was heated in a central coal-fired boiler, and a network of insulated pipes served each house with space heating and hot water for domestic use, with the cost of heating included in the rent. This was designed and built during a period of low bulk energy costs, but proved very expensive following the Oil Crisis of 1973 which increased the cost of energy. As heating cost increases had to be absorbed into the rent, the village became uneconomic for those residents who were not reliant on state benefits (which paid housing costs), and many of those in employment left the estate to move to other housing where they could have more control of heating costs.

The outflow of employed residents led to a process of social engineering (whether intentional or not) whereby those on unemployment or other state benefits were relocated into Penrhys from other council-run estates, with the initial prospect of saving on separate heating costs. As a result of the concentration of socially-impoverished residents during the 1970s and 1980s, the village gained a poor reputation and was seen by many as an undesirable location. In an attempt to rejuvenate the village, the Priority Estate Programme was undertaken in the late 1980s with all houses refurbished and environmental improvements made throughout the community. This, though, proved unsuccessful as the reputation of Penrhys was so low that new occupants could not be found; this led to newly refurbished houses being vandalised as they stood empty. This in turn fuelled the area's negative reputation.

By the 1990s the local authorities had begun a relocation programme for Penrhys, with many buildings demolished once the tenants had been relocated. By the early 21st century much of the village had been demolished, leaving around 300 buildings remaining.

== Historic buildings and religious sites ==
=== Medieval monastery ===
Many legends surround the old monastery at Penrhys, though the historicity of most has now been dismissed. It was originally believed that the monastery was Franciscan and built under the orders of Henry I; another tale states that Welsh king Rhys ap Tewdwr was beheaded by the Normans at the site. Both these tales have been disproven, though many books hold these tales as fact. The village even takes its name from one of the legends as it was originally called Pen-Rhys ap Tewdwr (the head of Rhys ap Tewdwr). Surviving documents refer to the site as a 'manor' belonging to Cistercian Abbey of Llantarnam in Gwent and the first mention of Penrhys was in a document regarding a grant of land to the abbey in 1203. The manor may have originally been an outlying sheep farm or grange, but by the 15th century had become a place of pilgrimage. The manor consisted of three large buildings, a well, chapel and hostelry; the hostelry probably created as a service and commercial undertaking to accommodate the pilgrims.

=== Ffynnon Fair ===
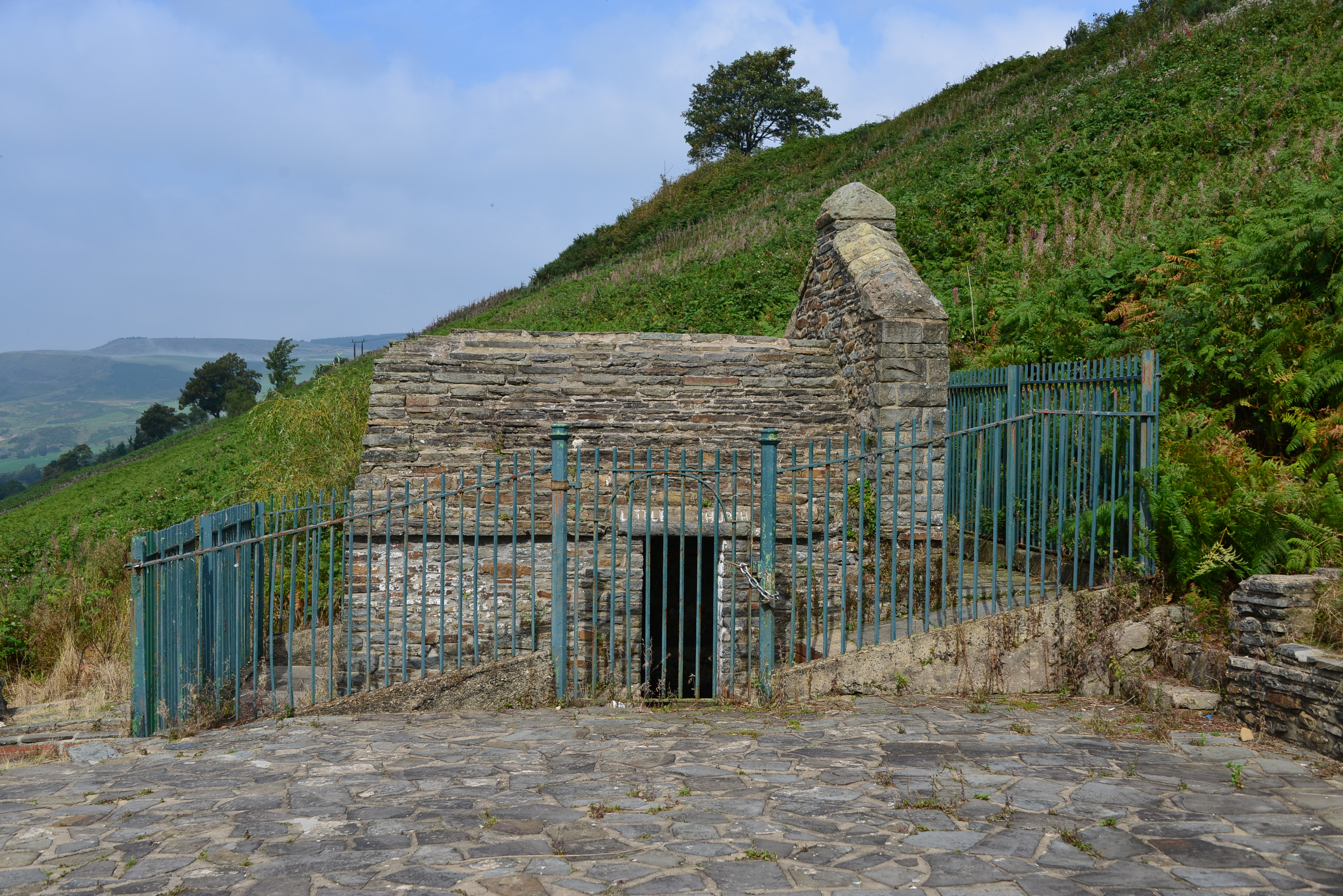
Ffynnon Fair

Ffynnon Fair (also: Ffynon Mair), St. Mary's Well, is a well which lies on the hillside overlooking the village of Llwynypia. The well has been the focus of religious activity in Penrhys and is the oldest recorded Christian site in the Rhondda. It is recognised by some historians that the site may date back further, and could be pagan in origin. The waters from the well were believed to have the ability to cure ailments, particularly rheumatism and poor eyesight, and were reported by Rhisiart ap Rhys as:

"There are rippling waters at the top of the rock
Farewell to every ailment that desires them!
White wine runs in the rill,
That can kill pain and fatigue!"

A vaulted stone building was built around the well which, although heavily restored, still exists today. The structure over the well is entirely built of local Pennant Sandstone, with one side built into the sloping hillside. The interior of the small rectangular building consists of stone benches around three walls; a cistern occupies the south wall. A niche in the north wall was said to have held a statue of Mary. The floor is paved with dressed flagstones.

=== The Shrine of Our Lady of Penrhys ===
Legend tells that a statue of the Virgin Mary appeared in the branches of an oak tree near to the holy well. The statue was said to have been incredibly beautiful and a gift from heaven. Many people tried to remove the statue from the tree but it resisted all attempts to the point where 'Eight oxen could not have drawn the Image of Penrhys from its place...' The statue would only allow itself to be retrieved once the chapel and shrine were built. The original statue survived at Penrhys until 1538 when, under Henry VIII's dissolution of the monasteries, Bishop Latimer wrote to Thomas Cromwell suggesting the destruction of the shrine. With the shrine burned during the night, the statue was taken to London where it was publicly burned with other Catholic artifacts.

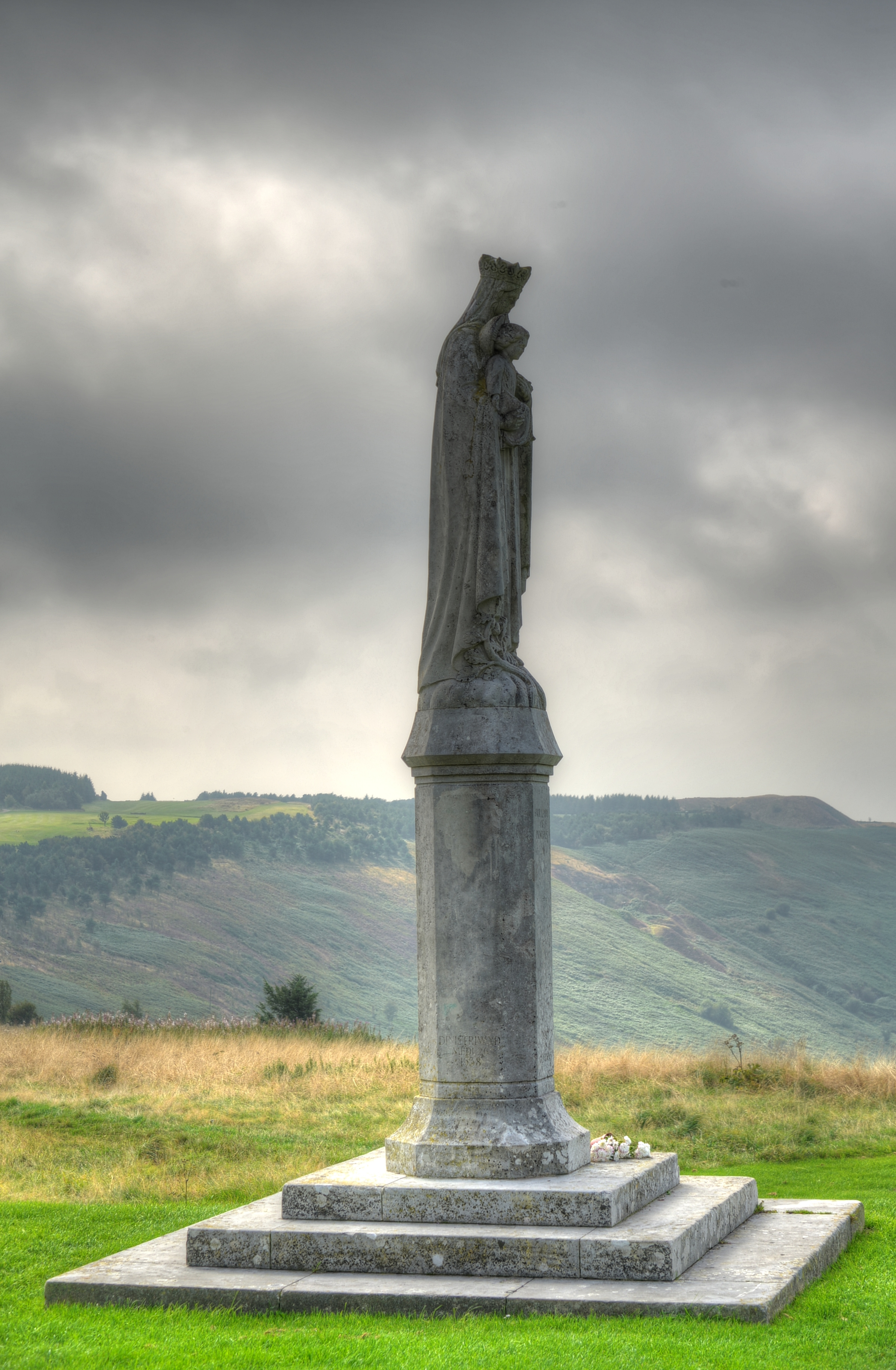
The 1953 statue

The Shrine of Our Lady was still visited throughout the following centuries with records showing devotion up until 1842; though by this date little of the original shrine survived. In the early 20th century Miss M. M. Davies of Llantrisant, a Catholic convert, supplied funds for the construction of a memorial church to be built at nearby Ferndale. She would also procure a wooden replica of the original Statue of Penrhys. In 1936, Rev P.J. Gibbons, parish priest of the church at Ferndale revived the pilgrimages and in 1939 the Rhondda Borough Council, recognising the importance of the site, took measures to restore and protect the Holy Well. On 2 July 1953 a new statue was revealed by Archbishop McGrath at the site of the old chapel. Standing on a plinth and although much larger than the original, was carved from Portland stone using the descriptions left behind in medieval Welsh poetry. More than 20,000 people attended the first pilgrimage after the erection of the new statue. Due to its religious importance, Penrhys is part of the Cistercian Way, and many people still make pious pilgrimages to the site every year.

=== Penrhys chapel ===
Penrhys chapel was originally built as part of the manor. Little remains of the building, though excavations in 1912 discovered that the chapel was made up of a nave and chancel divided by a cross-wall, with a series of buttresses on the outside of the nave. This original building was at some time destroyed or demolished and a new chapel rebuilt on the original foundations. Dressed stones and fragments of green glass discovered at the site place the chapel at no earlier than the 14th century. The site now houses the modern statue of the Virgin Mary.

== Public transport ==
Penrhys is served by the B4512 linking it to the A4058 at Ystrad Rhondda to the west and to the A4233 and Tylorstown to the east. Penrhys has no local railway station.

== Sport ==
The Penrhys golf course is situated nearby.

== Bibliography ==
- Chidgey, Rev. Paul (1982). Our Lady of Penrhys. Cardiff: The Catholic Truth Society (Welsh Province).
- Hurlock, K. (2018) Medieval Welsh Pilgrimage, c. 1100-1500. New York: Palgrave. ISBN 978-1-137-43098-4 https://doi.org/10.1057/978-1-137-43099-1
- Newman, John (1995). Glamorgan. London: Penguin Group. ISBN 0-14-071056-6.
- Slater, Rev. F. Our Lady of Penrhys, The National Shrine of Wales. South Western Printers Ltd.
