= Ynyshir railway station =

Former railway station in Wales

Ynyshir

General information
- Location: Ynyshir, Rhondda Cynon Taf; Wales
- Coordinates: 51.6269°N 3.4092°W
- Grid reference: ST025929
- Platforms: 2

Other information
- Status: Disused

History
- Original company: Taff Vale Railway
- Pre-grouping: Taff Vale Railway
- Post-grouping: Great Western Railway

Key dates
- 1885: Opened as Ynishir
- 1907: Renamed Ynyshir
- 15 June 1964: Closed
Location

Ynyshir railway station served the village of Ynyshir, in the Rhondda Fach valley in south Wales, from 1885 to 1964.

== History ==
The station was opened by the Taff Vale Railway (TVR) in 1885, on its Maerdy Branch, which ran along the Rhondda Fach valley. It was the first station up the valley from the junction at Porth. At a later date, the spelling of the station name was amended to Ynyshir.

The TVR amalgamated with the Great Western Railway (GWR) on 1 January 1922; the GWR in its turn amalgamated with other railways to form British Railways on 1 January 1948.

The station was closed by British Railways on 15 June 1964. The remains of the station were demolished around 2005 for the construction of the A4233 which now occupies the site of the railway.

Preceding station	Disused railways	Following station
Porth; Line closed, station open	Taff Vale Railway; Maerdy Branch	Wattstown Platform; Line and station closed
