= Cistercian Way (Wales) =

650-mile circular footpath in Wales

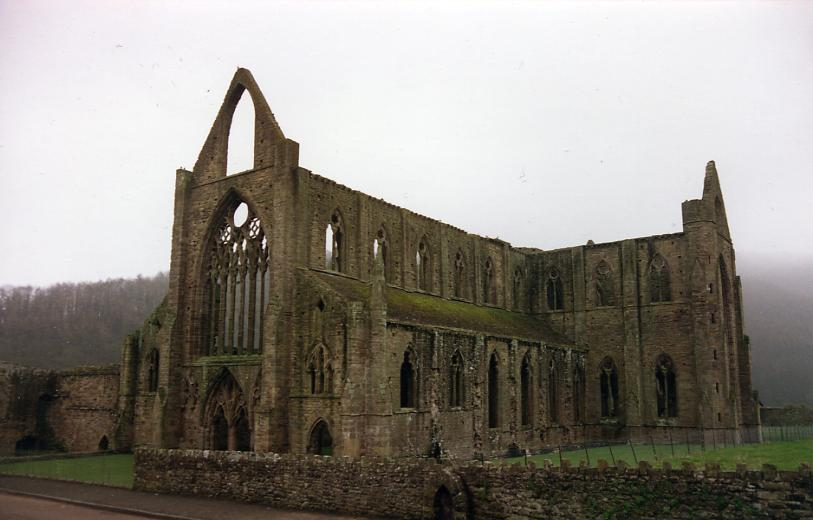
Tintern Abbey

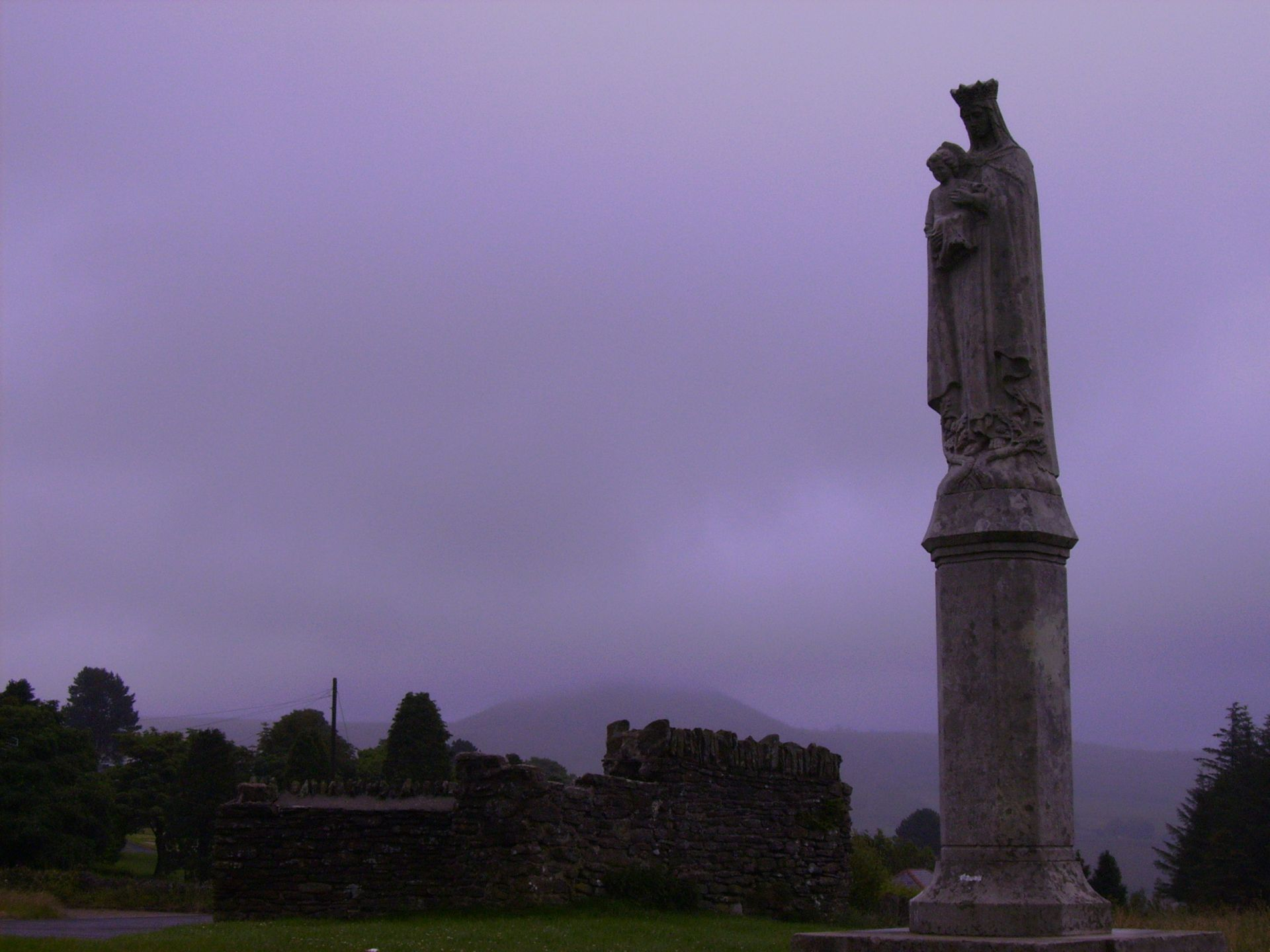
Virgin Mary, Penrhys

The Cistercian Way is a waymarked, long-distance trail which circumnavigates Wales, linking the Cistercian historic sites of Wales. It is a circular walk and can be started from any point along its route. The total length is approximately 650 miles (1,050 km).

The Cistercian Way started in May 1998 as part of the annual pilgrimage of the Society of St David and St Nicholas to Penrhys in the Rhondda as part of the celebrations of the 900th anniversary of the foundation of the Cistercian order.

Tintern Abbey, founded by Walter de Clare in 1131, was the first Abbey to be built in Wales. One section of the route follows the medieval pilgrimage route from Llantarnam Abbey, built on the site of an old Cistercian monastery and now occupied by the Sisters of St. Joseph of Annecy, to the shrine of Our Lady of Penrhys. Not far from the shrine is Ffynnon Fair (or St. Mary's Well), a holy well overlooking the village of Llwynypia and the oldest recorded Christian site in the Rhondda. The waters from the well were believed to have the ability to cure ailments. Neath Abbey was once the largest abbey in Wales.

The route includes both the coast and the hinterland of Wales, incorporating Conwy, Basingwerk Abbey, Valle Crucis and Strata Marcella abbeys, Abbeycwmhir, Grace Dieu, Tintern Abbey, Neath Abbey, Whitland, Strata Florida and Cymer Abbey.

It connects to many of Wales's other long-distance paths. The Coed Morgannwg Way and Saint Illtyd's Walk have terminus points near Margam Abbey. At Tenby one can take a boat over to the current Cistercian monastery on Caldey Island and access the Pembrokeshire Coast Path. The Monks' Trod in Mid Wales links Strata Florida Abbey in Ceredigion to Cwmhir Abbey to the east.
