= Pontygwaith =

Coordinates: 51.6695°N 3.3313°W

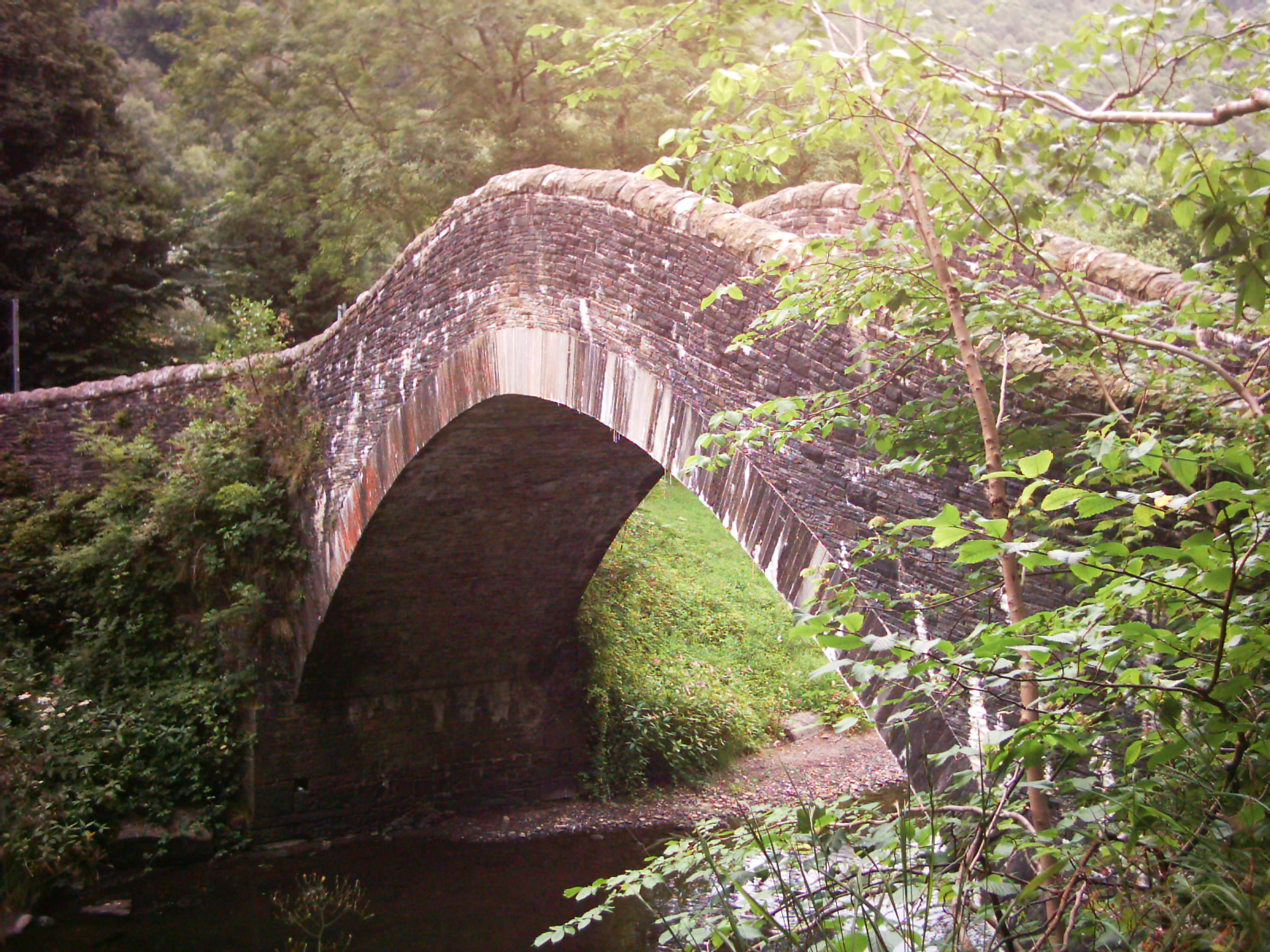
The bridge at Pontygwaith

Pontygwaith (Welsh,"Bridge to work" or "Bridge of the Ironworks") is a village in the Taff Valley, 9 km (6 miles) south of Merthyr Tydfil in Wales.

A Sussex Ironmaster named Anthony Morley set up a small ironworks here in 1583.

On 21 February 1804 Richard Trevithick ran the first ever steam locomotive along tracks, now known as the Merthyr Tramroad, carrying both iron ore and passengers, from Penydarren near Merthyr Tydfil, via Pontygwaith, south to Abercynon.

There is little of the original village remaining today, which was inhabited and existed until approx 1977 as a terrace of ten houses and a farm. The site of the original village is accessible from the Taff Trail National cycle route 8. This leads down a heavily tree lined slope to the area that was the original village site.

The bridge over the River Taff at Pontygwaith is a Grade II listed structure. and was featured in the Beauty and the Beast episode of the BBC's Merlin, where a girl has a picnic with a troll beneath the bridge.

Pontygwaith today lacks many dwellings, but one notable exception is Pontygwaith Farm, located on the hill near the bridge, which offers tea room facilities. The gardens have occasionally been opened, for charity days, by the owners.

The National Cycle Network route 477 Taith Trevithick Trail heads up the east side of the valley from Pontygwaith to Trevithick's Tunnel - just south of Merthyr Tydfil, old stone sleepers can still be seen all around these trails on the east side of the valley where the famous tramroad ran. Cycle route 8 (the Taff Trail) passes through the village.
