= Maerdy Branch =

Railway branch line in Wales

The Maerdy Branch was a railway branch line in South Wales. Financed and operated by the Taff Vale Railway, on amalgamation it became part of the Great Western Railway in 1923. Designed and mainly operated as a coal mining freight railway, its creation and demise was wholly defined by the South Wales Coalfield.

== Design ==
The branch was wholly designed, being developed by integrating a series of private industrial track railways with the extension of the Taff Vale Railway from the south at Pontypridd. In 1840, the TVR bought the private Ferndale to Maerdy colliery track and then extended it to Porth in 1849.

== Operations ==
Passenger operations began in 1875, serving interim stations from Porth at Ynyshir (opened 1876), Pontygwaith, Tylorstown, and Ferndale. Though the line had opened up to Maerdy the same year (with the sinking & commissioning of Maerdy Colliery), it was not until 1889 that the passenger service was extended there from Ferndale. Passenger traffic was neither heavy nor a major contribution to line finances, and so in 1900 the GWR introduced steam rail motors. Ten or eleven return trips each weekday was the standard service frequency for the branch for most of its life.

== Closure ==
The last passenger train ran on 13 June 1964 as a result of the Beeching cuts, leaving only the freight service to Maerdy Colliery. As a result, the line was reduced to single track working. The line was placed into maintenance only upkeep from June 1986 and subsequently closed completely in August that year, after the coal mined at Maerdy was raised at Tower Colliery.

== Present day ==
The track was lifted in 1996, with the trackbed and most of the bridges left in situ. This formed the canal section of the Taff Trail cycle route.

In 2004, Rhondda Cynon Taff council came to an arrange with Network Rail to buy the trackbed from just north of Maerdy Junction to Margaret Street, Pontygwaith and convert it into a relief road for Ynyshir. Construction work started in May 2005, removing the remains of Ynyshir station, the bridges at Llanwonno road and Station street, and the replacement of the Rhondda Fach bridge at Ynyshir and the Ynyshir road bridge. Today the A4233 Porth and Lower Rhondda Fach Relief Road (Porth Bypass), has meant a significant decrease in traffic flows through the main street, Ynyshir Road.

=== Preservation ===
In April 2019, a local group of enthusiasts looking to improve the local economic outlook by bringing tourists to the area, proposed reinstating the 3 miles of track north of Tylorstown to Maerdy. The proposal includes reinstatement of some stations and former industrial buildings.
