= 1894 Aberdare Urban District Council election =

1894 Welsh local government election

The first election to the Aberdare Urban District Council was held in December 1894. It was followed by the 1896 election.

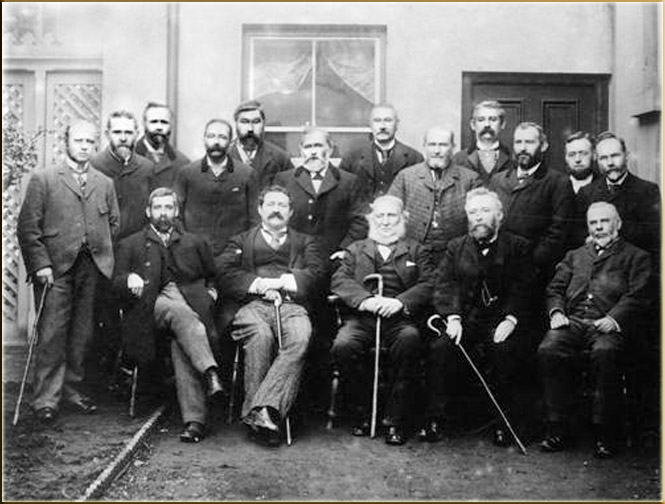
Members of the first Aberdare Urban District Council, 1894

There were five wards, namely Aberaman (also known as No. 5 Ward), Blaengwawr (also known as No. 4 Ward), Gadlys (also known as No. 2 Ward), Llwydcoed (also known as No. 1 Ward), and the Town Ward (also known as No. 3 Ward). Three members were elected from each ward making a total of fifteen members on the authority. In subsequent elections a third of the council would be elected each year. Therefore, the members returned at the head of the poll would serve until 1898, those in second place until 1897 and those in third place until 1896. Rhys Hopkin Rhys, chair of the previous Local Board of Health became the first chairman of the Urban District Council.

== Aberaman Ward ==
Aberaman Ward
Party	Candidate	Votes	%	±%
	Edmund Mills Hann	697		
	Rev Thomas Humphreys	645		
	Thomas Rees	428		
Lib-Lab	Phillip Daniel Rees	368		

== Blaengwawr Ward ==
Blaengwawr Ward 1894
Party	Candidate	Votes	%	±%
	Morgan John	767		
	David Price Davies	600		
	John Howell	549		
	John Simon	422		

== Gadlys Ward ==
Gadlys Ward
Party	Candidate	Votes	%	±%
	William Thomas	721		
	Rev Benjamin Evans	503		
	Griffith George	458		
	John David Rees	419		
	David Davies	334		
	Daniel Tudor Williams	311		
	William Walker	302		
	Evan Hopkins	198		
	John Thomas	134		

== Llwydcoed Ward ==
Llwydcoed Ward
Party	Candidate	Votes	%	±%
	Rees Hopkin Rhys	684		
	Rees Llewellyn	640		
	Owen Harris	623		
	John William Evans	525		
Labour	David Morgan	198		

== Town Ward ==
Town Ward
Party	Candidate	Votes	%	±%
	Edward Morgan	837		
	David Williams	639		
	Thomas Thomas	618		
	David Davies	493		
	Joseph Price	474		
