= 1910 Glamorgan County Council election =

1910 Welsh local government election

All 68 seats to Glamorgan County Council 35 seats needed for a majority
	First party	Second party	Third party
Party	Liberal	Conservative	Liberal Unionist
Last election	53/66	13/66	1/68
Seats before	53/66	13/66	1/68
Seats won	51/66	15/66	1/68
Councillors	37	12	1
Aldermen	14	3	0
Seats +/–	▼2	▲2	▼0
	Fourth party
Party	Independent
Last election	1/68
Seats before	1/68
Seats won	1/68
Councillors	1
Aldermen	0
Seats +/–	▼o
Council control after election
Liberal
Liberal Party

The 1910 Glamorgan County Council election was the eighth contest for seats on this local authority in south Wales. It was preceded by the 1907 election and followed by the 1913 election.

== Overview of the result ==
As in most parts of Wales, the Liberal Party was once again triumphant and won a majority of the seats. The Conservatives made a further advance in the western part of the county where they also held on in a number of industrial wards where the influence of paternalism remained strong. A more striking factor was the advance of Labour candidates in several areas and there were also a number of Liberal members who were returned under a 'progressive' banner with support from the labour movement.

== Boundary changes ==
There were a number of boundary changes following the secession of Merthyr Tydfil from Glamorgan to create a new County Borough. Eight new wards were created. These included those in the Barry Urban District (Cadoxton), Caerphilly (Aber Valley), Gelligaer Urban District (Hengoed), Maesteg, Mountain Ash Urban District,

== Candidates ==
There were a number of unopposed returns and candidates identified as Liberals contested almost all seats. There were a significant number of Conseratives and relatively few Labour candidates. The political affiliation of some candidates was not noted. (Note: The Western Mail noted that it was difficult to analyse the political complexion of the outgoing council due to a number of members having stood as Independents in 1907.)

All eleven retiring aldermen were Liberals, or Lib-Lab members as the Conservatives and their allies had been denied any seats on the aldermanic bench since 1901.

== Outcome ==
Most seats were contested. In the western part of the county, industrialists standing as Conservatives continued to hold their found in some wards.

=== Aberdare, Mountain Ash and Merthyr districts ===
There were only two contested elections in the Aberdare district, and both were again more personal than political.

=== Bridgend and Maesteg districts ===
There were a number of contested elections in this area.

=== Swansea, Pontardawe and Port Talbot districts ===
In these areas the Conservatives again performed well, mainly at the expense of the Liberals.

== Results by ward ==
=== Aber Valley ===
Aber Valley 1910
Party	Candidate	Votes	%	±%
Labour	Hubert Jenkins	Unopposed		
Labour win (new seat)				

=== Aberaman ===
Aberaman 1910
Party	Candidate	Votes	%	±%
Liberal	Thomas Luther Davies*	Unopposed		
Liberal hold		Swing		

=== Aberavon ===
J.M. Smith held on to the seat he had held since 1889, increasing his majority over Labour. The result was said to have been greeted by a large crowd.

Aberavon 1910
Party	Candidate	Votes	%	±%
Independent	John Morgan Smith*	729		
Labour	Josiah Charles	337		
Majority		392		
Independent hold		Swing		

=== Abercynon ===
Boundary Change. The Labour candidate had entered the fray at the last moment causing a three-cornered contest in this new ward.

Abercynon 1910
Party	Candidate	Votes	%	±%
Liberal	Dr Isaac Llewelyn Morris*	709		
Liberal	James Evans	508		
Labour	W.H. May	461		
Majority		201		
Liberal hold		Swing		

=== Aberdare Town ===
Aberdare Town 1910
Party	Candidate	Votes	%	±%
Liberal	David Hughes*	Unopposed		
Liberal hold		Swing		

=== Bargoed ===
Bargoed 1910
Party	Candidate	Votes	%	±%
Liberal	Rev D.L. Evans	729		
Labour	Walter Lewis	611		
Majority		118		
Liberal gain from Independent		Swing		

=== Barry ===
Barry 1910
Party	Candidate	Votes	%	±%
Liberal	Rev D.H. Williams**	Unopposed		
Liberal hold		Swing		

=== Barry Dock ===
Barry Dock 1910
Party	Candidate	Votes	%	±%
Liberal	James Jones*	888		
Conservative	F.T. Moesford	311		
Majority		577		
Liberal win (new seat)				

=== Blaengwawr ===
In a contest between two Liberals, John Howell, first elected in 1895, was defeated by Gwilym Treharne who had opposed him on several occasions in the past.

Blaengwawr 1910
Party	Candidate	Votes	%	±%
Liberal	Gwilym Alexander Treharne	696		
Liberal	John Howell*	624		
Majority		72		
Liberal hold		Swing		

=== Bridgend ===
Randall was again returned unopposed, with the Liberals deciding not to oppose him.

Bridgend 1910
Party	Candidate	Votes	%	±%
Conservative	John Morgan Randall*	Unopposed		
Conservative hold		Swing		

=== Briton Ferry ===
Briton Ferry 1910
Party	Candidate	Votes	%	±%
Liberal	Thomas Gwynne*	Unopposed		
Liberal hold		Swing		

=== Cadoxton ===
Cadoxton 1904
Party	Candidate	Votes	%	±%
Liberal	Gwyn Morris	729		
Liberal	P.J. O' Donnell*	492		
Majority		237		
Liberal hold		Swing		

=== Caerphilly ===
Boundary Change. The previous Caerphilly division was divided.

Caerphilly 1910
Party	Candidate	Votes	%	±%
Liberal	Joseph Howells	778		
Independent Liberal	Josiah Morgan	641		
Majority		137		
Liberal win (new seat)				

=== Cilfynydd ===
Cilfynydd 1910
Party	Candidate	Votes	%	±%
Liberal	Philip Jones	Unopposed		
Liberal hold		Swing		

=== Coedffranc ===
Coedffranc 1910
Party	Candidate	Votes	%	±%
Liberal	William Howell*	Unopposed		
Liberal hold		Swing		

=== Coity ===
Coity 1910
Party	Candidate	Votes	%	±%
Liberal	William Evans*	571		
Liberal	Rev H. Eynon Lewis	286		
Liberal hold		Swing		

=== Cowbridge ===
The sitting member, a timber merchant at Pendoylan, who had captured the seat three years previously, was now returned unopposed.

Cowbridge 1907
Party	Candidate	Votes	%	±%
Liberal	Thomas William David*	unopposed		
Liberal hold		Swing		

=== Cwmavon ===
Henry Davies held on to the seat he won in 1907.

Cwmavon 1910
Party	Candidate	Votes	%	±%
Labour	Henry Davies*	747		
Liberal	Moses Thomas	433		
Majority		314		
Labour hold		Swing		

=== Cymmer ===
Cymmer 1910
Party	Candidate	Votes	%	±%
Labour	David Watts-Morgan*	Unopposed		
Labour hold		Swing		

=== Dinas Powys ===
The sitting member had held the seat for many years and was again returned.

Dinas Powys 1910
Party	Candidate	Votes	%	±%
Conservative	Oliver Henry Jones*	527		
Liberal	D.R. Morgan	405		
Majority		122		
Conservative hold		Swing		

=== Dulais Valley ===
Dulais Valley 1910
Party	Candidate	Votes	%	±%
Liberal	Daniel Daniels	679		
Liberal	Ll.D. Howell*	378		
Labour	George Jones	185		
Liberal hold		Swing		

=== Ferndale ===
Ferndale 1910
Party	Candidate	Votes	%	±%
Liberal	Thomas Samuel*	Unopposed		
Liberal hold		Swing		

=== Gadlys ===
Following the recent death of Griffith George, a fellow Liberal was elected in his place. There was no Labour candidate.

Gadlys 1910
Party	Candidate	Votes	%	±%
Liberal	T. Walter Williams	838		
Liberal	William Thomas Harris	136		
Majority		702		
Liberal hold		Swing		

=== Garw Valley ===
Garw Valley 1910
Party	Candidate	Votes	%	±%
Liberal	Rev. William Saunders	Unopposed		
Liberal hold		Swing		

=== Gelligaer ===
Gelligaer 1904
Party	Candidate	Votes	%	±%
Liberal	Evan Thomas	739		
Conservative	D.S. Jones*	494		
Majority		245		
Liberal gain from Conservative		Swing		

=== Glyncorrwg ===
Glyncorrwg 1910
Party	Candidate	Votes	%	±%
Labour	William Jenkins*	Unopposed		
Labour hold		Swing		

=== Gower ===
Gower 1910
Party	Candidate	Votes	%	±%
Independent	George E. Gordon*	561		
Labour	W.H. Davies	496		

=== Hengoed ===
In this new ward, long-serving alderman David Prosser was defeated.

Hengoed 1910
Party	Candidate	Votes	%	±%
Independent	W.D. Lloyd	616		
Liberal	David Prosser**	315		

=== Kibbor ===
Henry Lewis again returned after many years.

Kibbor 1910
Party	Candidate	Votes	%	±%
Conservative	Henry Lewis*	1,035		
Liberal	D. Morgan Rees	379		
Majority		656		
Conservative hold		Swing		

=== Llandaff ===
Robert Forrest held the seat comfortably.

Llandaff 1910
Party	Candidate	Votes	%	±%
Conservative	Robert Forrest*	969		
Liberal	William Evans	544		

=== Llandeilo Talybont ===
First elected in 1889, Rees Harries was again returned by a substantial majority.

Llandeilo Talybont 1910
Party	Candidate	Votes	%	±%
Liberal	Rees Harries**	764		
Liberal	J.R. Watkins	218		
Majority		546		
Liberal hold		Swing		

=== Llansamlet ===
Llansamlet 1910
Party	Candidate	Votes	%	±%
Liberal	John Jordan*	Unopposed		
Liberal hold		Swing		

=== Llantrisant ===
Llantrisant 1907
Party	Candidate	Votes	%	±%
Liberal	J. Blandy Jenkins*	unopposed		

=== Llwydcoed ===
Llwydcoed 1910
Party	Candidate	Votes	%	±%
Conservative	Rees Llewellyn*	Unopposed		
Conservative hold		Swing		

=== Llwynypia and Clydach ===
Llwynypia and Clydach 1910
Party	Candidate	Votes	%	±%
Liberal	James Evans*	Unopposed		
Liberal hold		Swing		

=== Loughor and Penderry ===
John Glasbrook was elected unopposed following the retirement of Sir John Llewelyn.

Loughor and Penderry 1910
Party	Candidate	Votes	%	±%
Conservative	John Glasbrook	Unopposed		
Conservative hold		Swing		

=== Maesteg, Caerau and Nantyffyllon ===
Vernon Hartshorn, miners agent was returned by a huge majority

Maesteg, Caerau and Nantyffyllon 1910
Party	Candidate	Votes	%	±%
Labour	Vernon Hartshorn	933		
Liberal	John Roderick	171		

=== Maesteg, East and West ===
This was a repeat of the contest three years previously with the same result.

Maesteg East and West 1910
Party	Candidate	Votes	%	±%
Liberal	Evan E. Davies	1,067		
	J.P. Gibbon	776		

=== Margam ===
Following the retirement of the Liberal member, the son of the former Independent councillor, defeated in 1904, won a narrow victory over Labour.

Margam 1910
Party	Candidate	Votes	%	±%
Independent	Llewelyn David	973		
Labour	Rees Llewellyn	941		
Majority		32		
Independent gain from Liberal		Swing		

=== Morriston ===
Morriston 1910
Party	Candidate	Votes	%	±%
	William John Percy Player	Unopposed		
		Swing		

=== Mountain Ash ===
Mountain Ash 1910
Party	Candidate	Votes	%	±%
Liberal	William Jones*	Unopposed		
Liberal hold		Swing		

=== Neath (North) ===
Neath (North) 1910
Party	Candidate	Votes	%	±%
Liberal	Hopkin Morgan*	Unopposed		
Liberal hold		Swing		

=== Neath (South) ===
Neath (South) 1910
Party	Candidate	Votes	%	±%
Liberal	Frederick William Gibbins*	Unopposed		
Liberal hold				

=== Newcastle ===
Newcastle 1910
Party	Candidate	Votes	%	±%
Liberal	T.J. Hughes**	Unopposed		
Liberal hold		Swing		

=== Ogmore ===
The ward was renamed Porthcawl. In a close contest a prominent Liberal defeated the former Conservative councillor.

Ogmore 1907
Party	Candidate	Votes	%	±%
Liberal	Rev W.J. Phillips	573		
Conservative	J.D.I. Nicholl	502		
Liberal hold		Swing		

=== Ogmore Valley ===
Ogmore Valley 1910
Party	Candidate	Votes	%	±%
Liberal	William Llewellyn**'	Unopposed		
Liberal hold		Swing		

=== Oystermouth ===
Oystermouth 1910
Party	Candidate	Votes	%	±%
Conservative	T.W. James*	Unopposed		
Conservative hold		Swing		

=== Penarth North ===
Penarth North 1904
Party	Candidate	Votes	%	±%
Conservative	Rev E.S. Roberts	387		
Liberal	Jenkin Llewellyn	385		
Majority		2		
Conservative hold		Swing		

=== Penarth South ===
Penarth South
Party	Candidate	Votes	%	±%
	Frederick Henry Jotham	unopposed		

=== Penrhiwceiber ===
Penrhiwceiber 1910
Party	Candidate	Votes	%	±%
Liberal	Dr. Ben Phillips Jones	unopposed		
Liberal hold		Swing		

=== Pentre ===
Pentre 1910
Party	Candidate	Votes	%	±%
Liberal	E.T. Davies	996		
Liberal	J.B. Price	476		
Liberal hold		Swing		

=== Pontardawe ===
Pontardawe 1907
Party	Candidate	Votes	%	±%
Conservative	Frank W. Gilbertson*	922		
Labour	Johnny James	710		
Majority		212		
Conservative hold		Swing		

=== Pontlottyn ===
Pontlottyn 1910
Party	Candidate	Votes	%	±%
Liberal	William Williams	563		
Liberal	J. E. Jones	372		
Majority		200		
Liberal hold		Swing		

=== Pontypridd ===
Pontypridd 1910
Party	Candidate	Votes	%	±%
Labour	E.H. Fleming*	Unopposed		
Labour hold		Swing		

=== Penygraig ===
Penygraig 1910
Party	Candidate	Votes	%	±%
Liberal	Dr T.R. Llewellyn*	Unopposed		
Liberal hold		Swing		

=== Porth ===
Porth and Penygraig 1910
Party	Candidate	Votes	%	±%
Liberal	William Evans	920		
Labour	John Hughes	411		
Majority		509		
Liberal hold		Swing		

=== Resolven ===
Resolven 1901
Party	Candidate	Votes	%	±%
Liberal	Daniel Evans**	unopposed		
Liberal hold		Swing		

=== Sketty ===
Sketty 1910
Party	Candidate	Votes	%	±%
Liberal	Rev John Davies	355		
Labour	Thomas Hopkins	300		
Liberal hold		Swing		

=== Swansea Valley ===
Swansea Valley 1904
Party	Candidate	Votes	%	±%
Liberal	E. Lewis*	825		
Liberal	Dr J. Jones	364		
Majority		461		
Liberal hold		Swing		

=== Treforest ===
Treforest 1910
Party	Candidate	Votes	%	±%
Liberal	W. Spickett*	Unopposed		
Liberal hold		Swing		

=== Treherbert ===
Treherbert 1910
Party	Candidate	Votes	%	±%
Liberal	Enoch Davies*	Unopposed		
Liberal hold		Swing		

=== Treorchy ===
Treorchy 1910
Party	Candidate	Votes	%	±%
Liberal	Thomas Jones*	Unopposed		
Liberal hold		Swing		

=== Trealaw and Tonypandy ===
Tonypandy 1910
Party	Candidate	Votes	%	±%
Liberal	D.W. Davies*	Unopposed		
Liberal hold		Swing		

=== Tylorstown ===
Tylorstown 1910
Party	Candidate	Votes	%	±%
Liberal	Dr T.H. Morris*	Unopposed		
Liberal hold		Swing		

=== Ynyshir ===
Ynyshir 1910
Party	Candidate	Votes	%	±%
Liberal	W.H. Mathias**	Unopposed		
Liberal hold		Swing		

=== Ystalyfera ===
Ystalyfera 1910
Party	Candidate	Votes	%	±%
Labour	John Griffiths	528		
Liberal	Edgar Rees	308		
Liberal	D.W. Davies	38		
Majority		220		
Labour hold		Swing		

=== Ystrad ===
Clifford Cory, the member since 1892, was once again returned unopposed.

Ystrad 1904
Party	Candidate	Votes	%	±%
Liberal	Clifford John Cory*	unopposed		
Liberal hold		Swing		

== Election of Aldermen ==
In addition to the 66 councillors the council consisted of 22 county aldermen. Boundary changes following the secession of Merthyr kept the number of councillors at 66 through the creation of additional wards. The number of aldermen therefore remained unchanged. Aldermen were elected by the council, and served a six-year term. Following the 1910 election, there were twelve Aldermanic vacancies rather than eleven owing to the resignation of John Davies, an alderman elected for a Merthyr ward.

The following aldermen were appointed by the newly elected council.

elected for six years Thomas, W. M. David G. h- Fleming, Rhys 11 airies, Dd. Hughes G. J. Hughes, W. Jones, J. Jordan, Rhys Llew- ellyn, W. Llewellyn, W. H. Matthews, W. M. Williams, and Rev. D. H. Williams.

elected for three years

== By-Elections ==
=== Aberdare Town by-election ===
William Thomas, High Constable of Miskin Higher, who had been nominated at the initial election but agreed to withdraw to prevent a split in the Liberal ranks was now returned unopposed.

Aberdare Town by-election 1910
Party	Candidate	Votes	%	±%
Liberal	William Thomas	unopposed		
Liberal hold		Swing		

=== Llwydcoed by-election ===
Harris, elected when Llewellyn was initially made an alderman, was again returned.

Llwydcoed by-election 1910
Party	Candidate	Votes	%	±%
Liberal	M.J. Harris*	unopposed		

== Bibliography ==
- Williams, Chris (1996). Democratic Rhondda: Politics and society 1885-1951. Cardiff: University of Wales Press.
