= 1904 Aberdare Urban District Council election =

1904 Welsh local government election

The Aberdare Urban District Council was established in 1894 and covered the parish of Aberdare. Its responsibilities included public health, sanitation, roads and public works generally.

There were five wards, namely Aberaman (also known as No. 5 Ward), Blaengwawr (also known as No. 4 Ward), Gadlys (also known as No. 2 Ward), Llwydcoed (also known as No. 1 Ward), and the Town Ward (also known as No. 3 Ward). Originally, one member was elected from each ward on an annual basis, but from 1904 an additional member was granted to each ward resulting in the election of ten members, out of a total of twenty, every three years. At the intervening election, one member continued to be elected.

An election was held in April 1904. It was preceded by the 1903 election and followed by the 1905 election. The term of office of members elected at the 1901 election came to an end and those elected were to serve until 1907.

In line with an increase in the population a number of additional seats had been granted by the County Council.

(*) denotes sitting member

== Results by ward ==
=== Aberaman Ward (two seats) ===
Aberaman Ward
Party	Candidate	Votes	%	±%
	Edmund Mills Hann*	1,156		
Labour	Charles B. Stanton	796		
	Morgan Powell	565		

=== Blaengwawr Ward (two seats) ===
Blaengwawr Ward 1904
Party	Candidate	Votes	%	±%
Labour	David Davies	unopposed		
Labour	Edmund Stonelake	unopposed		

=== Gadlys Ward ===
Gadlys Ward 1904
Party	Candidate	Votes	%	±%
	Rev J. Morgan Jones	688		
	William Thomas	487		
	W. Harper	480		
	A.S. Pleace	290		

=== Llwydcoed Ward (two seats) ===
Llwydcoed Ward
Party	Candidate	Votes	%	±%
	Rees Llewellyn*	872		
	T. Walter Williams	866		
	William Williams	238		
	Joseph Morgan	177		
	James Berry	125		

=== Town Ward (two seats) ===
Town Ward
Party	Candidate	Votes	%	±%
	Edward Morgan*	933		
	David Price Davies	932		
	David Phillips	380		

== Bibliography ==
- Jones, Ieuan Gwynedd (1981). Explorations & Explanations. Essays in the Social History of Victorian Wales. Llandysul: Gomer. ISBN 0 85088 644 9.
- Jones, Ieuan Gwynedd (1987). Communities. Essays in the Social History of Victorian Wales. Llandysul: Gomer. ISBN 0 86383 223 7.
- Morgan, Kenneth O (1991). Wales in British Politics 1868-1922. Cardiff: University of Wales Press. ISBN 0708311245.
- Parry, Jon (1989). "Labour Leaders and Local Politics 1888-1902: The Example of Aberdare". Welsh History Review. 14 (3): 399–416.
