= 1896 Aberdare Urban District Council election =

1896 Welsh local government election

The Aberdare Urban District Council was established in 1894 and covered the parish of Aberdare. Its responsibilities included public health, sanitation, roads and public works generally.

There were five wards, namely Aberaman (also known as No. 5 Ward), Blaengwawr (also known as No. 4 Ward), Gadlys (also known as No. 2 Ward), Llwydcoed (also known as No. 1 Ward), and the Town Ward (also known as No. 3 Ward). At this time, one member was elected from each ward on an annual basis.

In contrast to the inaugural contest, the election of 1896 created little excitement, with three of the five seats being uncontested. Of the two contested sets, it was the Gadlys Ward that attracted most coverage in the local press. The election provides evidence of the way in which the nonconformist middle-classes of Aberdare, closely allied to the Liberal Party were increasingly dominating the public life of what was an important political centre in Wales. At this time, also the working classes were beginning to become organised through the miners' union and, to a lesser extent, the Independent Labour Party.

The election is interesting and relevant because it demonstrates the nature of social interaction between the middle- and working-classes in the industrial south Wales of the 1890s. It was a time of industrial disputes and conflicts but also of concern about lack of educational opportunities for working-class children and the state of housing. It would appear that the miners and other workmen, once a set of middle-class councillors had been elected, were willing to allow those members to represent the community.

(*) denotes sitting member

== Aberaman Ward ==
Thomas Rees, landlord of the Swan Inn, Aberaman, had run unsuccessfully for the county council the previous year but had been defeated by the sitting member, Thomas Davies of Abercwmboi. He narrowly held his seat against another Liberal candidate.

Aberaman Ward
Party	Candidate	Votes	%	±%
Liberal	Thomas Rees*	583		
Liberal	Dr D. Davies Jones	561		

== Blaengwawr Ward ==
Blaengwawr Ward 1896
Party	Candidate	Votes	%	±%
	John Howell*	unopposed		

== Gadlys Ward ==
Griffith George held on against an unsuccessful candidate at the previous election.

Gadlys Ward
Party	Candidate	Votes	%	±%
Liberal	Griffith George*	636		
Liberal	Daniel Tudor Williams	555		

== Llwydcoed Ward ==
Llwydcoed Ward
Party	Candidate	Votes	%	±%
	Owen Harries*	unopposed		

== Town Ward ==
Thomas Thomas, the sitting member and a former county councillor was said to have been removed as candidate by the Liberal and Labour Association in favour of Lewis Noah Williams, a prominent local businessman and son of William Williams (Carw Coch). John William Evans, who had ousted Thomas from the seat at the 1895 election was also nominated but also withdrew before the poll.

Town Ward
Party	Candidate	Votes	%	±%
	Lewis Noah Williams	unopposed		

== Bibliography ==
- Jones, Ieuan Gwynedd (1981). Explorations & Explanations. Essays in the Social History of Victorian Wales. Llandysul: Gomer. ISBN 0-85088-644-9.
- Jones, Ieuan Gwynedd (1987). Communities. Essays in the Social History of Victorian Wales. Llandysul: Gomer. ISBN 0-86383-223-7.
- Morgan, Kenneth O (1991). Wales in British Politics 1868-1922. Cardiff: University of Wales Press. ISBN 0708311245.
- Parry, Jon (1989). "Labour Leaders and Local Politics 1888-1902: The Example of Aberdare". Welsh History Review. 14 (3): 399–416.
