= 1900 Aberdare Urban District Council election =

1900 Welsh local government election

The Aberdare Urban District Council was established in 1894 and covered the parish of Aberdare. Its responsibilities included public health, sanitation, roads and public works generally.

There were five wards, namely Aberaman (also known as No. 5 Ward), Blaengwawr (also known as No. 4 Ward), Gadlys (also known as No. 2 Ward), Llwydcoed (also known as No. 1 Ward), and the Town Ward (also known as No. 3 Ward). At this time, one member was elected from each ward on an annual basis.

An election was held in April 1900. It was preceded by the 1899 election and followed by the 1901 election. The term of office of members elected at the 1897 election came to an end and those elected were to serve until 1903.

(*) denotes sitting member

== Results by ward ==
=== Aberaman Ward ===
Aberaman Ward 1900
Party	Candidate	Votes	%	±%
	Rev Thomas Humphreys*	unopposed		

=== Blaengwawr Ward ===
Blaengwawr Ward 1900
Party	Candidate	Votes	%	±%
	David Price Davies*	unopposed		

=== Gadlys Ward ===
Gadlys Ward 1900
Party	Candidate	Votes	%	±%
	Rev Benjamin Evans*	685		
	David Morgan*	454		

=== Llwydcoed Ward (two seats) ===
Two members were elected owing to the vacant seat following the death of Rees Hopkin Rhys.

Llwydcoed Ward 1900
Party	Candidate	Votes	%	±%
	John William Evans	734		
	Rees Llewellyn*	717		
	Thomas Lewis	427		

=== Town Ward ===
Hodges died in 1902 before the completion of his term.

Town Ward
Party	Candidate	Votes	%	±%
	William Hodges	820		
	J. Howells	410		

== Bibliography ==
- Jones, Ieuan Gwynedd (1981). Explorations & Explanations. Essays in the Social History of Victorian Wales. Llandysul: Gomer. ISBN 0 85088 644 9.
- Jones, Ieuan Gwynedd (1987). Communities. Essays in the Social History of Victorian Wales. Llandysul: Gomer. ISBN 0 86383 223 7.
- Morgan, Kenneth O (1991). Wales in British Politics 1868-1922. Cardiff: University of Wales Press. ISBN 0708311245.
- Parry, Jon (1989). "Labour Leaders and Local Politics 1888-1902: The Example of Aberdare". Welsh History Review. 14 (3): 399–416.
