= 1913 Glamorgan County Council election =

1913 Welsh local government election

The 1913 Glamorgan County Council election was the ninth contest for seats on this local authority in south Wales. It was preceded by the 1910 election and followed, due to the First World War, by the 1919 election.

== Overview of the result ==
As in most parts of Wales, the Liberal Party was once again triumphant and won a majority of the seats. The Conservatives made some impact, as did the Labour Party, although in case of the latter there was no sign of a breakthrough.

== Boundary Changes ==
There were no boundary changes at this election.

== Contested Elections ==
49 of the 66 councilors were returned unopposed. Only a small number of those seats that were contested changed hands. In many areas, contests between Liberal and Labour candidates were avoided and the Progressive label widely adopted. The Conservatives gained two seats at Llandeilo Talybont and Llansamlet while Labour lost at both Cwmavon and Ystalyfera. This was counterbalanced by a Labour victory at Pontardawe.

=== Aberdare and Mountain Ash ===
All eight members were returned unopposed in the Aberdare Valley and no Labour candidates entered the fray.

=== Bridgend and Maesteg districts ===
There were a number of contested elections in this area.

=== Swansea, Pontardawe and Port Talbot districts ===
In these areas the Conservatives again performed well, mainly at the expense of the Liberals.

== Division results ==
=== Aberaman ===
Aberaman 1913
Party	Candidate	Votes	%	±%
Liberal	Thomas Luther Davies*	unopposed		
Liberal hold		Swing		

=== Aberavon ===
Aberavon 1913
Party	Candidate	Votes	%	±%
Independent	John Morgan Smith**	unopposed		
Independent hold		Swing		

=== Abercynon ===
Abercynon 1913
Party	Candidate	Votes	%	±%
Liberal	Dr I. Llewelyn Morris	unopposed		
Liberal hold		Swing		

=== Aberdare Town ===
Aberdare Town 1913
Party	Candidate	Votes	%	±%
Liberal	David Hughes**	unopposed		
Liberal hold		Swing		

=== Bargoed ===
Bargoed 1910
Party	Candidate	Votes	%	±%
Liberal	Rev D. Leyshon Evans	729	54.4	
Labour	Walter Lewis	611	45.6	
Majority		118		
Liberal gain from Independent		Swing		

=== Barry ===
Barry 1904
Party	Candidate	Votes	%	±%
Liberal	Rev D.H. Williams	899		
Conservative	F.P. Jones-Lloyd	629		
Majority		270		
Liberal hold		Swing		

=== Barry Dock ===
Barry Dock 1913
Party	Candidate	Votes	%	±%
Liberal	James Jones*	595		
Liberal	Eliza Benjamin Smith Jones	265		
Majority		230		
Liberal hold		Swing		

=== Blaengwawr ===
Blaengwawr 1913
Party	Candidate	Votes	%	±%
Liberal	Gwilym Alexander Treharne*	unopposed		
Liberal hold		Swing		

=== Bridgend ===
Randall was again returned unopposed, with the Liberals deciding not to oppose him.

Bridgend 1910
Party	Candidate	Votes	%	±%
Conservative	John Morgan Randall*	unopposed		
Conservative hold		Swing		

=== Briton Ferry ===
Briton Ferry 1913
Party	Candidate	Votes	%	±%
Liberal	Thomas Gwynn*	unopposed		
Liberal hold		Swing		

=== Cadoxton ===
Cadoxton 1904
Party	Candidate	Votes	%	±%
Liberal	Gwyn Morris	729		
Liberal	P.J. O' Donnell*	492		
Majority		237		
Liberal hold		Swing		

=== Caerphilly ===
Boundary Change. The previous Caerphilly division was divided.

Caerphilly 1910
Party	Candidate	Votes	%	±%
Liberal	Joseph Howells	778		
Independent Liberal	Josiah Morgan	641		
Majority		137		
Liberal win (new seat)				

=== Cilfynydd ===
Cilfynydd 1901
Party	Candidate	Votes	%	±%
Liberal	W.R. Davies*	unopposed		
Liberal hold		Swing		

=== Coedffranc ===
Coedffranc 1913
Party	Candidate	Votes	%	±%
Liberal	William Howell*	unopposed		
Liberal gain from Conservative		Swing		

=== Coity ===
Coity 1910
Party	Candidate	Votes	%	±%
Liberal	William Evans*	571		
Liberal	Rev H. Eynon Lewis	286		
Liberal hold		Swing		

=== Cowbridge ===
Cowbridge 1913
Party	Candidate	Votes	%	±%
Conservative	Colonel Homfray*	unopposed		
Conservative hold		Swing		

=== Cwmavon ===
Cwmavon 1913
Party	Candidate	Votes	%	±%
Independent	Percy Jacobs	673		
Labour	Henry Davies*	747		
Majority		82		
Independent gain from Labour		Swing		

=== Cymmer ===
Cymmer 1901
Party	Candidate	Votes	%	±%
Liberal	Morgan Williams*	unopposed		
Liberal hold		Swing		

=== Dinas Powys ===
Dinas Powys 1913
Party	Candidate	Votes	%	±%
Conservative	Oliver Henry Jones*	654		
Liberal	David Richard Morgan	364		
Majority		290		
Conservative hold		Swing		

=== Dulais Valley ===
Dulais Valley 1913
Party	Candidate	Votes	%	±%
Liberal	Daniel Daniels*	932		
Labour	George Jones	320		
Liberal hold		Swing		

=== Ferndale ===
Ferndale 1904
Party	Candidate	Votes	%	±%
Liberal	Thomas Samuel*	1,224		
Conservative	E. Nelmes	546		
Majority		678		
Liberal hold		Swing		

=== Gadlys ===
Gadlys 1913
Party	Candidate	Votes	%	±%
Liberal	T. Walter Williams*	unopposed		
Liberal hold		Swing		

=== Garw Valley ===
Garw Valley 1913
Party	Candidate	Votes	%	±%
Liberal	John Thomas*	Unopposed	N/A	N/A

=== Gelligaer ===
Gelligaer 1904
Party	Candidate	Votes	%	±%
Liberal	Evan Thomas	739		
Conservative	D.S. Jones*	494		
Majority		245		
Liberal gain from Conservative		Swing		

=== Glyncorrwg ===
Glyncorrwg 1913
Party	Candidate	Votes	%	±%
Labour	William Jenkins*	unopposed		

=== Gower ===
Gower 1913
Party	Candidate	Votes	%	±%
Independent	George E. Gordon*	608		
Labour	W.H. Davies	386		

=== Hengoed ===
In this new ward, long-serving alderman David Prosser was defeated.

Hengoed 1910
Party	Candidate	Votes	%	±%
Independent	W.D. Lloyd	616		
Liberal	David Prosser**	315		

=== Kibbor ===
Henry Lewis again returned after many years.

Kibbor 1910
Party	Candidate	Votes	%	±%
Conservative	Henry Lewis*	1,035		
Liberal	D. Morgan Rees	379		
Majority		656		
Conservative hold		Swing		

=== Llandaff ===
Robert Forrest held the seat comfortably.

Llandaff 1910
Party	Candidate	Votes	%	±%
Conservative	Robert Forrest*	969		
Liberal	William Evans	544		

=== Llandeilo Talybont ===
Llandeilo Talybont 1913
Party	Candidate	Votes	%	±%
Conservative	E.M. Clason Dahne	705		
Liberal	Thomas Williams*	513		
Majority		192		
Conservative gain from Liberal		Swing		

=== Llansamlet ===
Llansamlet 1913
Party	Candidate	Votes	%	±%
Conservative	A.T. Williams	767		
Liberal	J.W. Johnson*	361		
Conservative gain from Liberal		Swing		

=== Llantrisant ===
Llantrisant 1913
Party	Candidate	Votes	%	±%
Liberal	J. Blandy Jenkins*	unopposed		

=== Llwydcoed ===
Llwydcoed 1913
Party	Candidate	Votes	%	±%
Liberal	Thomas Lewis	unopposed		

=== Llwynypia and Clydach ===
James Evans, grocer, elected following Richard Lewis's election as alderman in 1901, was returned unopposed.

Llwynypia and Clydach 1904
Party	Candidate	Votes	%	±%
Liberal	James Evans*	unopposed		

=== Loughor and Penderry ===
Loughor and Penderry 1913
Party	Candidate	Votes	%	±%
Conservative	John Glasbrook*	1,145		
Labour	William Lloyd	202		
Conservative hold		Swing		

=== Maesteg, Caerau and Nantyffyllon ===
Maesteg, Caerau and Nantyffyllon 1913
Party	Candidate	Votes	%	±%
Labour	John Evans	822		
Liberal	Rev B. Thomas	438		

=== Maesteg, East and West ===
This was a repeat of the contest three years previously with the same result.

Maesteg East and West 1910
Party	Candidate	Votes	%	±%
Liberal	Evan E. Davies	1,067		
	J.P. Gibbon	776		

=== Margam ===
Having run as an Independent in 1910, narrowly defeating the Labour candidate, the sitting member was returned as a Conservative.

Margam 1913
Party	Candidate	Votes	%	±%
Conservative	Llewelyn David*	unopposed		
Conservative gain from Independent		Swing		

=== Merthyr Vale ===
Merthyr Vale 1904
Party	Candidate	Votes	%	±%
Liberal	David Prosser*	880		
Liberal	Rowland Evans	729		
Majority		151		
Liberal hold		Swing		

=== Morriston ===
Morriston 1910
Party	Candidate	Votes	%	±%
	William John Percy Player	unopposed		
		Swing		

=== Mountain Ash ===
Mountain Ash 1913
Party	Candidate	Votes	%	±%
Liberal	Lord Aberdare	unopposed		
Liberal hold		Swing		

=== Neath (North) ===
Neath (North) 1913
Party	Candidate	Votes	%	±%
Liberal	Hopkin Morgan*	unopposed		
Liberal hold		Swing		

=== Neath (South) ===
Neath (South) 1913
Party	Candidate	Votes	%	±%
Liberal	Frederick William Gibbins*	Unopposed	N/A	N/A
Liberal hold				

=== Newcastle ===
T.J. Hughes, vice-chairman of the county council was returned unopposed.

Newcastle 1910
Party	Candidate	Votes	%	±%
Liberal	T.J. Hughes**	unopposed		
Liberal hold		Swing		

=== Ogmore ===
The ward was renamed Porthcawl. In a close contest a prominent Liberal defeated the former Conservative councillor.

Ogmore 1907
Party	Candidate	Votes	%	±%
Liberal	Rev W.J. Phillips	573		
Conservative	J.D.I. Nicholl	502		
Liberal hold		Swing		

=== Ogmore Valley ===
Alderman William Llewellyn was again returned unopposed.

Ogmore Valley 1910
Party	Candidate	Votes	%	±%
Liberal	William Llewellyn**	unopposed		
Liberal hold		Swing		

=== Oystermouth ===
Oystermouth 1913
Party	Candidate	Votes	%	±%
Conservative	T.W. James*	unopposed		
Conservative hold		Swing		

=== Penarth North ===
Penarth North 1904
Party	Candidate	Votes	%	±%
Conservative	Rev E.S. Roberts	387		
Liberal	Jenkin Llewellyn	385		
Majority		2		
Conservative hold		Swing		

=== Penarth South ===
Penarth South
Party	Candidate	Votes	%	±%
	Frederick Henry Jotham	unopposed		

=== Penrhiwceiber ===
Penrhiwceiber 1913
Party	Candidate	Votes	%	±%
Liberal	Dr. Ben Phillips Jones	unopposed		
Liberal hold		Swing		

=== Pentre ===
E.T. Davies, auctioneer, had been elected at a by-election following Elias Henry Davies's appointment as alderman in 1902. He was now returned unopposed.

Pentre 1910
Party	Candidate	Votes	%	±%
Liberal	E.T. Davies	996		
Liberal	J.B. Price	476		
Liberal hold		Swing		

=== Pontardawe ===
Pontardawe 1913
Party	Candidate	Votes	%	±%
Labour	David Daniel Davies	811		
Independent	L.W. Francis	376		
Liberal	Thomas Howells	153		
Majority		435		
Labour gain from Conservative		Swing		

=== Porthcawl ===
Porthcawl 1913
Party	Candidate	Votes	%	±%
Liberal	Rev W.J. Phillips*	634		
Conservative	J.C. Coath	374		

=== Pontlottyn ===
Pontlottyn 1910
Party	Candidate	Votes	%	±%
Liberal	William Williams	563		
Liberal	J. E. Jones	372		
Majority		191		
Liberal hold		Swing		

=== Pontypridd ===
Pontypridd 1913
Party	Candidate	Votes	%	±%
Labour	Fleming	602		
Liberal	James Roberts*	398		
Conservative	H.M. Gregory	383		
Majority		204		
Labour gain from Liberal		Swing		

=== Penygraig ===
Penygraig appears to be a new ward.

Penygraig 1904
Party	Candidate	Votes	%	±%
Liberal	Rees Lloyd	unopposed		
Liberal hold		Swing		

=== Porth ===
Porth and Penygraig 1904
Party	Candidate	Votes	%	±%
Liberal	William Evans	920		
Labour	John Hughes	411		
Majority		509		
Liberal hold		Swing		

=== Resolven ===
Resolven 1901
Party	Candidate	Votes	%	±%
Liberal	Daniel Evans**	unopposed		
Liberal hold		Swing		

=== Sketty ===
Sketty 1913
Party	Candidate	Votes	%	±%
Liberal	Rev John Davies*	505		
Labour	William John Morgan	283		
Liberal hold		Swing		

=== Swansea Valley ===
Swansea Valley 1913
Party	Candidate	Votes	%	±%
Labour	D.T. Williams*	1,047		
Liberal	J. Arnold	407		
Majority		640		
Liberal hold		Swing		

=== Trealaw ===
Trealaw 1913
Party	Candidate	Votes	%	±%
Liberal	D.C. Evans	587		
Labour	William John	47		
Majority		540		
Independent gain from Liberal		Swing		

=== Treforest ===
Treforest 1913
Party	Candidate	Votes	%	±%
Independent	David Williams	1,240		
Liberal	William Spickett*	595		
Majority		645		
Independent gain from Liberal		Swing		

=== Treherbert ===
Enoch Davies, returned in 1901 following William Morgan's re-election as alderman, was elected unopposed.

Treherbert 1904
Party	Candidate	Votes	%	±%
Liberal	Enoch Davies*	unopposed		
Liberal hold		Swing		

=== Treorchy ===
Thomas Jones, Co-operative stores manager, was returned unopposed.

Treorchy 1904
Party	Candidate	Votes	%	±%
Liberal	Thomas Jones*	unopposed		
Liberal hold		Swing		

=== Trealaw and Tonypandy ===
D.W. Davies, the member since 1898, was returned unopposed for the second successive election.

Tonypandy 1904
Party	Candidate	Votes	%	±%
Liberal	D.W. Davies*	unopposed		
Liberal hold		Swing		

=== Tylorstown and Ynyshir ===
Sitting councillor Dr T.H. Morris stood down to allow Alderman W.H. Mathias to be returned unopposed.

Tylorstown and Ynyshir 1904
Party	Candidate	Votes	%	±%
Liberal	W.H. Mathias**	unopposed		
Liberal hold		Swing		

=== Vale of Neath ===
Vale of Neath 1913
Party	Candidate	Votes	%	±%
Conservative	Col. J. Edwards-Vaughan	960		
Liberal	Dr Pritchard	926		
Majority		34		
Conservative hold		Swing		

=== Ystalyfera ===
Ystalyfera 1913
Party	Candidate	Votes	%	±%
Liberal	D.W. Davies	636		
Labour	John Griffiths*	480		
Majority		156		
Liberal gain from Labour		Swing		

=== Ystrad ===
Clifford Cory, the member since 1892, was once again returned unopposed.

Ystrad 1904
Party	Candidate	Votes	%	±%
Liberal	Clifford John Cory*	unopposed		
Liberal hold		Swing		

== Election of Aldermen ==
In addition to the 66 councillors the council consisted of 22 county aldermen. Boundary changes following the secession of Merthyr kept the number of councillors at 66 through the creation of additional wards. The number of aldermen therefore remained unchanged. Aldermen were elected by the council, and served a six-year term. Following the 1910 election, there were twelve Aldermanic vacancies rather than eleven owing to the resignation of John Davies, an alderman elected for a Merthyr ward.

The following aldermen were appointed by the newly elected council.

elected for six years Thomas, W. M. David G. h- Fleming, Rhys 11 airies, Dd. Hughes G. J. Hughes, W. Jones, J. Jordan, Rhys Llew- ellyn, W. Llewellyn, W. H. Matthews, W. M. Williams, and Rev. D. H. Williams.

elected for three years

== By-Elections ==
The following by-elections were held following the election of aldermen.

== Bibliography ==
- Williams, Chris (1996). Democratic Rhondda: Politics and society 1885-1951. Cardiff: University of Wales Press.
