= 1905 Aberdare Urban District Council election =

1906 Welsh local government election

The Aberdare Urban District Council was established in 1894 and covered the parish of Aberdare. Its responsibilities included public health, sanitation, roads and public works generally.

There were five wards, namely Aberaman (also known as No. 5 Ward), Blaengwawr (also known as No. 4 Ward), Gadlys (also known as No. 2 Ward), Llwydcoed (also known as No. 1 Ward), and the Town Ward (also known as No. 3 Ward). Originally, one member was elected from each ward on an annual basis, but from 1904 an additional member was granted to each ward resulting in the election of ten members, out of a total of twenty, every three years. At the intervening election, one member continued to be elected.

An election was held in April 1905. It was preceded by the 1904 election and followed by the 1906 election. The term of office of members elected at the 1902 election came to an end and those elected were to serve until 1908. There were contested elections in three of the five wards. In both the Gadlys and Town wards the sitting members were returned unopposed after the Trades and Labour Council resolved not to run candidates.

(*) denotes sitting member

== Results by ward ==
=== Aberaman Ward ===
Aberaman Ward 1905
Party	Candidate	Votes	%	±%
Labour	John Davies	862		
	Morgan Powell	601		
	John Evans	20		
Majority		261		
		Swing		

=== Blaengwawr Ward ===
Having come within 71 votes of Howell at the 1904 county election, Treharne's supporters had been hopeful of success.

Blaengwawr Ward 1905
Party	Candidate	Votes	%	±%
	John Howell*	845		
	G.A. Treharne	624		

=== Gadlys Ward ===
Gadlys Ward 1905
Party	Candidate	Votes	%	±%
	W.T. Morgan*	874		
		Swing		

=== Llwydcoed Ward ===
Llwydcoed Ward 1905
Party	Candidate	Votes	%	±%
	M.J. Harries	852		
Labour	John Teague	424		

=== Town Ward ===
Town Ward 1905
Party	Candidate	Votes	%	±%
	Lewis Noah Williams*	unopposed		
		Swing		

== Bibliography ==
- Jones, Ieuan Gwynedd (1981). Explorations & Explanations. Essays in the Social History of Victorian Wales. Llandysul: Gomer. ISBN 0 85088 644 9.
- Jones, Ieuan Gwynedd (1987). Communities. Essays in the Social History of Victorian Wales. Llandysul: Gomer. ISBN 0 86383 223 7.
