= 1904 Glamorgan County Council election =

1904 Welsh local government election

The 1904 Glamorgan County Council election was the sixth contest for seats on this authority in south Wales. It was preceded by the 1901 election and followed by the 1907 election. Glamorgan was by far the largest county in Wales in terms of population. Glamorgan County Council had been established by the Local Government Act 1888, the first elections being held in early 1889.

== Overview of the result ==
As in most parts of Wales, the Liberal Party was once again triumphant and won a majority of the seats. In 1904 the majority of the seats were uncontested, in contrast to the position at previous elections.

Results are drawn from a number of sources. They include a number of newspapers.

== Boundary changes ==
There were no boundary changes at this election.

== Retiring aldermen ==
Eight of the eleven retiring aldermen were Liberals.

== Contested elections ==
In the Rhondda district, the local paper stated that 'no truer manifestation of good faith and respect for the retiring County Councillors could have been shown than that eight of them were returned unopposed.' There were only two contested elections in the valley.

== Results by ward ==
=== Aberaman ===
Aberaman 1904
Party	Candidate	Votes	%	±%
Liberal	Thomas Luther Davies	unopposed		
Liberal hold		Swing		

=== Aberavon ===
John Morgan Smith held on to the seat he had held since 1889 by a mere two votes. At previously elections he had described himself both as a Conservative and Independent and had been returned unopposed on several occasions.

Aberavon 1904
Party	Candidate	Votes	%	±%
Independent	John Morgan Smith*	538		
Liberal	Frank B. Smith	536		
Majority		2		
Independent hold		Swing		

=== Aberdare Town ===
Retiring alderman J.W. Evans was returned unopposed. Retiring councillor David Hughes did not stand.

Aberdare Town 1904
Party	Candidate	Votes	%	±%
Liberal	John William Evans**	Unopposed	N/A	N/A
Liberal hold				

=== Barry ===
J.C. Meggitt stood down after fifteen years.

Barry 1904
Party	Candidate	Votes	%	±%
Liberal	Rev D.H. Williams	899		
Conservative	F.P. Jones-Lloyd	629		
Majority		270		
Liberal hold		Swing		

=== Blaengwawr ===
Blaengwawr 1904
Party	Candidate	Votes	%	±%
Liberal	John Howell*	610		
Liberal	Gwilym Alexander Treharne	539		
Majority		71		
Liberal hold		Swing		

=== Cadoxton ===
This was a contest in which the controversy over the education rate featured and the sitting member, a Roman Catholic, was defeated by the clerk of the former School Board.

Cadoxton 1904
Party	Candidate	Votes	%	±%
Liberal	Gwyn Morris	729		
Liberal	P.J. O' Donnell*	492		
Majority		237		
Liberal hold		Swing		

=== Bridgend ===
Bridgend 1904
Party	Candidate	Votes	%	±%
Conservative	John Morgan Randall*	558		
Liberal	W. House	479		
Majority		99		
Conservative hold		Swing		

=== Briton Ferry ===
Jenkin Hill recaptured the seat he lost three years previously.

Briton Ferry 1901
Party	Candidate	Votes	%	±%
Liberal	Jenkin Hill*	unopposed		
Liberal hold		Swing		

=== Caeharris ===
After fifteen years, Edward P. Martin, managing director of Guest, Keen and Nettlefolds decided not to seek re-election but was replaced as candidate by Henry W. Martin, general manager of the company. A 'large deputation of tradespeople and workmen' was reported to have pressed him to stand.

Caeharris 1904
Party	Candidate	Votes	%	±%
Unionist	Henry W. Martin	unopposed		

=== Caerphilly ===
Caerphilly 1904
Party	Candidate	Votes	%	±%
Liberal	John Edward Evans	1,391		
Conservative	H.E. Morgan Lindsay*	982		
Majority		409		
Liberal hold		Swing		

=== Cilfynydd ===
Cilfynydd 1901
Party	Candidate	Votes	%	±%
Liberal	W.R. Davies*	unopposed		
Liberal hold		Swing		

=== Coedffranc ===
Coedffranc 1901
Party	Candidate	Votes	%	±%
Liberal	William Howell	unopposed		
Liberal gain from Conservative		Swing		

=== Coity ===
Coity 1898
Party	Candidate	Votes	%	±%
Liberal	William Howell*	unopposed		
Liberal hold		Swing		

=== Cowbridge ===
Cowbridge 1904
Party	Candidate	Votes	%	±%
Liberal	T.W. David	639		
Conservative	Colonel Homfray	446		
Majority		93		
Liberal gain from Conservative		Swing		

=== Cwmavon ===
Two Liberals, a sitting alderman and sitting councillor, opposed each other.

Cwmavon
Party	Candidate	Votes	%	±%
Liberal	Herbert Evans*	unopposed		
Liberal hold		Swing		

=== Cyfarthfa ===
Thomas Thomas recaptured the seat he lost three years previously.

Cyfarthfa 1898
Party	Candidate	Votes	%	±%
Lib-Lab	Thomas Thomas*	515		
Liberal	Thomas Davies	266		
Majority				
Lib-Lab gain from Liberal		Swing		

=== Cymmer ===
Cymmer 1901
Party	Candidate	Votes	%	±%
Liberal	Morgan Williams*	unopposed		
Liberal hold		Swing		

=== Dinas Powys ===
Dinas Powys
Party	Candidate	Votes	%	±%
Conservative	Oliver Henry Jones*	unopposed		
Conservative hold		Swing		

=== Dowlais ===
Dowlais 1904
Party	Candidate	Votes	%	±%
Lib-Lab	John Davies* (Note: The results in the local press incorrectly refer to Davies as an Unionist. He is described as a 'Radical' in a list of nominations in the same paper the previous week.)	410		
Liberal	D. Jenkins	397		
Majority		13		
Lib-Lab hold		Swing		

=== Dulais Valley ===
Dulais Valley
Party	Candidate	Votes	%	±%
Conservative	Evan Evans Bevan*	unopposed		
Conservative hold		Swing		

=== Ferndale ===
Ferndale 1904
Party	Candidate	Votes	%	±%
Liberal	Thomas Samuel*	1,224		
Conservative	E. Nelmes	546		
Majority		678		
Liberal hold		Swing		

=== Gadlys ===
Griffith George, who had previously served on the Aberdare School Board and Aberdare Urban District Council had been invited to contest the seat three years previously but had declined. Parker then stood and came within 41 votes of victory. There was some criticism of George for opposing Parker at this election but he held on to win by 96 votes.

Gadlys 1904
Party	Candidate	Votes	%	±%
Liberal	Griffith George	497		
Labour	Evan Parker	401		
Majority		96		
Liberal hold		Swing		

=== Garw Valley ===
Garw Valley
Party	Candidate	Votes	%	±%
Liberal	John Thomas*	unopposed		

=== Gellifaelog ===
Gellifaelog
Party	Candidate	Votes	%	±%
Liberal	Evan Lewis*	unopposed		

=== Gelligaer ===
Gelligaer 1904
Party	Candidate	Votes	%	±%
Liberal	Evan Thomas	739		
Conservative	D.S. Jones*	494		
Majority		245		
Liberal gain from Conservative		Swing		

=== Gower ===
Gower 1901
Party	Candidate	Votes	%	±%
	George E. Gordon*	unopposed		

=== Kibbor ===
Kibbor 1904
Party	Candidate	Votes	%	±%
Conservative	Henry Lewis*	757		
Liberal	Eli Rees	517		
Majority		240		
Conservative hold		Swing		

=== Llandaff ===
Llandaff
Party	Candidate	Votes	%	±%
Conservative	Robert Forrest*	unopposed		

=== Llandeilo Talybont ===
Llandeilo Talybont 1898
Party	Candidate	Votes	%	±%
Liberal	Rees Harries*	unopposed		

=== Llansamlet ===
Llansamlet 1901
Party	Candidate	Votes	%	±%
Conservative	John Jordan*	unopposed		

=== Llantrisant ===
Llantrisant
Party	Candidate	Votes	%	±%
Liberal	J. Blandy Jenkins*	unopposed		

=== Llwydcoed ===
Rees Llewellyn was again returned unopposed.

Llwydcoed 1904
Party	Candidate	Votes	%	±%
Liberal	Rees Llewellyn*	unopposed		

=== Llwynypia and Clydach ===
James Evans, grocer, elected following Richard Lewis's election as alderman in 1901, was returned unopposed.

Llwynypia and Clydach 1904
Party	Candidate	Votes	%	±%
Liberal	James Evans*	unopposed		

=== Lougher and Penderry ===
Loughor and Penderry 1901
Party	Candidate	Votes	%	±%
Conservative	Sir J.T.D. Llewellyn**	unopposed		

=== Maesteg ===
The same two candidates had faced each other in 1895. On that occasion, Barrow had won and was elected as alderman for a three-year period. Jenkin Jones was then returned at a by-election.

Maesteg
Party	Candidate	Votes	%	±%
Liberal	Jenkin Jones*	972		
Liberal	James Barrow**	842		

=== Margam ===
Margam 1904
Party	Candidate	Votes	%	±%
Liberal	Edward T. Evans	770		
Conservative	D.R. David*	716		
Majority		54		
Liberal hold		Swing		

=== Merthyr Town ===
Merthyr Town 1904
Party	Candidate	Votes	%	±%
Liberal	D.D. Jones	663		
Conservative	Dan Thomas	297		
Majority		366		
Liberal hold		Swing		

=== Merthyr Vale ===
Merthyr Vale 1904
Party	Candidate	Votes	%	±%
Liberal	David Prosser*	880		
Liberal	Rowland Evans	729		
Majority		151		
Liberal hold		Swing		

=== Morriston ===
Morriston 1901
Party	Candidate	Votes	%	±%
Liberal	William John Percy Player	unopposed		
Liberal hold		Swing		

=== Mountain Ash ===
Mountain Ash
Party	Candidate	Votes	%	±%
Liberal	Thomas Morris	549		
Liberal	Samuel Evans	459		
Liberal	John Lewis	316		
Majority		90		
Liberal hold		Swing		

=== Neath (North) ===
Neath (North) 1898
Party	Candidate	Votes	%	±%
Unionist	Hopkin Morgan	unopposed		
Unionist hold		Swing		

=== Neath (South) ===
At the previous election, Trick had stood as a Conservative.

Neath (South) 1898
Party	Candidate	Votes	%	±%
Independent	W.B. Trick	unopposed		
Independent gain from Liberal		Swing		

=== Newcastle ===
T.J. Hughes, first elected in 1889, had served as an alderman since 1898.

Newcastle 1904
Party	Candidate	Votes	%	±%
Liberal	Thomas J. Hughes**	841		
Conservative	Lynch Blosse	371		
Majority		470		
Liberal hold		Swing		

=== Ogmore ===
Ogmore 1904
Party	Candidate	Votes	%	±%
Liberal	G. Sibbering Jones	521		
Conservative	J.D.I Nicholl	384		
Majority		137		
Liberal hold		Swing		

=== Ogmore Valley ===
Ogmore Valley 1898
Party	Candidate	Votes	%	±%
Liberal	William Llewellyn*	unopposed		
Liberal hold		Swing		

=== Oystermouth ===
Oystermouth 1901
Party	Candidate	Votes	%	±%
	T.W. James	unopposed		
		Swing		

=== Penarth North ===
Penarth North 1904
Party	Candidate	Votes	%	±%
Conservative	Rev E.S. Roberts	387		
Liberal	Jenkin Llewellyn	385		
Majority		2		
Conservative hold		Swing		

=== Penarth South ===
Penarth South
Party	Candidate	Votes	%	±%
	Frederick Henry Jotham	unopposed		

=== Penrhiwceiber ===
Penrhiwceiber
Party	Candidate	Votes	%	±%
Liberal	Dr. R. W. Jones	unopposed		
Liberal hold		Swing		

=== Pentre ===
E.T. Davies, auctioneer, had been elected at a by-election following Elias Henry Davies's appointment as alderman in 1902. He was now returned unopposed.

Pentre 1904
Party	Candidate	Votes	%	±%
Liberal	E.T. Davies	unopposed		
Liberal hold		Swing		

=== Penydarren ===
Penydarren
Party	Candidate	Votes	%	±%
Liberal	David Davies*	516		
Conservative	T.E. Morgan	270		
Majority		146		

=== Pontardawe ===
Pontardawe 1904
Party	Candidate	Votes	%	±%
Conservative	Frank W. Gilbertson*	658		
Liberal	Rev B.D. Davies	657		
Majority		1		
Conservative hold		Swing		

=== Plymouth ===
Plymouth
Party	Candidate	Votes	%	±%
Liberal	Henry W. Lewis*	603		
Conservative	A. Daniel	440		

=== Pontlottyn ===
Pontlottyn 1904
Party	Candidate	Votes	%	±%
Liberal	D.B. Owen	572		
Liberal	John Griffiths	372		
Majority		200		
Liberal hold		Swing		

=== Pontypridd ===
The seat was now known as Pontypridd and Rhondda

Pontypridd 1904
Party	Candidate	Votes	%	±%
Labour	Fleming	602		
Liberal	James Roberts*	398		
Conservative	H.M. Gregory	383		
Majority		204		
Labour gain from Liberal		Swing		

=== Penygraig ===
Penygraig appears to be a new ward.

Penygraig 1904
Party	Candidate	Votes	%	±%
Liberal	Rees Lloyd	unopposed		
Liberal hold		Swing		

=== Porth ===
Porth and Penygraig 1904
Party	Candidate	Votes	%	±%
Lib-Lab	D. Watts Morgan	967		
Liberal	W.T. Davies	862		
Majority		105		
Liberal hold		Swing		

=== Resolven ===
Resolven 1901
Party	Candidate	Votes	%	±%
Liberal	Daniel Evans**	unopposed		
Liberal hold		Swing		

=== Sketty ===
John Davies had been defeated in the two previous elections but was now returned unopposed.

Sketty 1901
Party	Candidate	Votes	%	±%
Liberal	Rev John Davies	unopposed		
Liberal gain from Conservative		Swing		

=== Swansea Valley ===
Swansea Valley 1904
Party	Candidate	Votes	%	±%
Liberal	E. Lewis*	825		
Liberal	Dr J. Jones	364		
Majority		461		
Liberal hold		Swing		

=== Treforest ===
James Roberts had won the seat at a by-election following the death of the previous member, David Leyshon

Treforest 1898
Party	Candidate	Votes	%	±%
Independent	Samuel Evans	671		
Liberal	James Roberts*	614		
Majority		57		

=== Treherbert ===
Enoch Davies, returned in 1901 following William Morgan's re-election as alderman, was elected unopposed.

Treherbert 1904
Party	Candidate	Votes	%	±%
Liberal	Enoch Davies*	unopposed		
Liberal hold		Swing		

=== Treorchy ===
Thomas Jones, Co-operative stores manager, was returned unopposed.

Treorchy 1904
Party	Candidate	Votes	%	±%
Liberal	Thomas Jones*	unopposed		
Liberal hold		Swing		

=== Trealaw and Tonypandy ===
D.W. Davies, the member since 1898, was returned unopposed for the second successive election.

Tonypandy 1904
Party	Candidate	Votes	%	±%
Liberal	D.W. Davies*	unopposed		
Liberal hold		Swing		

=== Tylorstown and Ynyshir ===
Sitting councillor Dr T.H. Morris stood down to allow Alderman W.H. Mathias to be returned unopposed.

Tylorstown and Ynyshir 1904
Party	Candidate	Votes	%	±%
Liberal	W.H. Mathias**	unopposed		
Liberal hold		Swing		

=== Ystalyfera ===
Ystalyfera 1904
Party	Candidate	Votes	%	±%
Liberal	James Williams	303		
Liberal	John Williams	298		
Labour	David John Rees	172		
Majority		5		
Liberal hold		Swing		

=== Ystrad ===
Clifford Cory, the member since 1892, was once again returned unopposed.

Ystrad 1904
Party	Candidate	Votes	%	±%
Liberal	Clifford John Cory*	unopposed		
Liberal hold		Swing		

== Election of aldermen ==
In addition to the 66 councillors the council consisted of 22 county aldermen. Aldermen were elected by the council, and served a six-year term. Following the 1904 election, there were eleven Aldermanic vacancies.

The following aldermen were appointed by the newly elected council.

elected for six years

== Bibliography ==
- Parry, Jon (1989). "Labour Leaders and Local Politics 1888-1902: The Example of Aberdare". Welsh History Review. 14 (3): 399–416.
- Williams, Chris (1996). Democratic Rhondda: Politics and society 1885-1951. Cardiff: University of Wales Press.
