= 1901 Aberdare Urban District Council election =

1901 Welsh local government election

The Aberdare Urban District Council was established in 1894 and covered the parish of Aberdare. Its responsibilities included public health, sanitation, roads and public works generally.

There were five wards, namely Aberaman (also known as No. 5 Ward), Blaengwawr (also known as No. 4 Ward), Gadlys (also known as No. 2 Ward), Llwydcoed (also known as No. 1 Ward), and the Town Ward (also known as No. 3 Ward). At this time, one member was elected from each ward on an annual basis.

An election was held in April 1901. It was preceded by the 1900 election and followed by the 1902 election. The term of office of members elected at the 1898 election came to an end and those elected were to serve until 1904.

Labour candidates fought this election but, following the declaration of the result and the defeat of these candidates, Charles Stanton delivered a fiery speech condemning the working classes for their reluctance to support labour candidates.

(*) denotes sitting member

== Results by ward ==
=== Aberaman Ward ===
Aberaman Ward
Party	Candidate	Votes	%	±%
	Edmund Mills Hann*	1,025		
	T.R. Edwards	411		

=== Blaengwawr Ward ===
Blaengwawr Ward
Party	Candidate	Votes	%	±%
	Morgan John*	488		
	Gwilym Treharne	379		
	T. Meredith	210		
	W. Little	115		

=== Gadlys Ward ===
Gadlys Ward
Party	Candidate	Votes	%	±%
	William Thomas	unopposed		

=== Llwydcoed Ward ===
Llwydcoed Ward
Party	Candidate	Votes	%	±%
	Rees Llewellyn*	825		
	W. Williams	291		

=== Town Ward ===
Town Ward
Party	Candidate	Votes	%	±%
	Edward Morgan	unopposed		

== Bibliography ==
- Jones, Ieuan Gwynedd (1981). Explorations & Explanations. Essays in the Social History of Victorian Wales. Llandysul: Gomer. ISBN 0 85088 644 9.
- Jones, Ieuan Gwynedd (1987). Communities. Essays in the Social History of Victorian Wales. Llandysul: Gomer. ISBN 0 86383 223 7.
- Morgan, Kenneth O (1991). Wales in British Politics 1868-1922. Cardiff: University of Wales Press. ISBN 0708311245.
- Parry, Jon (1989). "Labour Leaders and Local Politics 1888-1902: The Example of Aberdare". Welsh History Review. 14 (3): 399–416.
