= 1903 Aberdare Urban District Council election =

1903 Welsh local government election

The Aberdare Urban District Council was established in 1894 and covered the parish of Aberdare. Its responsibilities included public health, sanitation, roads and public works generally.

There were five wards, namely Aberaman (also known as No. 5 Ward), Blaengwawr (also known as No. 4 Ward), Gadlys (also known as No. 2 Ward), Llwydcoed (also known as No. 1 Ward), and the Town Ward (also known as No. 3 Ward). At this time, one member was elected from each ward on an annual basis.

An election was held in April 1903. It was preceded by the 1902 election and followed by the 1904 election. The term of office of members elected at the 1900 election came to an end and those elected were to serve until 1906.

The election was notable for the breakthrough made by the Labour Party.

(*) denotes sitting member

== Results by ward ==
=== Aberaman Ward ===
Aberaman Ward
Party	Candidate	Votes	%	±%
Labour	William Rees	1,013	65.9	
Liberal	Rev Thomas Humphreys*	525	34.1	

=== Blaengwawr Ward ===
Blaengwawr Ward
Party	Candidate	Votes	%	±%
Labour	D. Jackson Thomas	816	62.2	
Liberal	David Price Davies*	495	37.8	

=== Gadlys Ward ===
Gadlys Ward
Party	Candidate	Votes	%	±%
Lib-Lab	Thomas Lewis*	774	61.3	
	A.S. Pleace	489	38.7	

=== Llwydcoed Ward ===
Llwydcoed Ward
Party	Candidate	Votes	%	±%
	John William Evans*	unopposed		

=== Town Ward ===
Town Ward
Party	Candidate	Votes	%	±%
Lib-Lab	R.L. Berry	749	72.7	
	D. Richards	281	27.3	

== Bibliography ==
- Jones, Ieuan Gwynedd (1981). Explorations & Explanations. Essays in the Social History of Victorian Wales. Llandysul: Gomer. ISBN 0 85088 644 9.
- Jones, Ieuan Gwynedd (1987). Communities. Essays in the Social History of Victorian Wales. Llandysul: Gomer. ISBN 0 86383 223 7.
- Morgan, Kenneth O (1991). Wales in British Politics 1868-1922. Cardiff: University of Wales Press. ISBN 0708311245.
- Parry, Jon (1989). "Labour Leaders and Local Politics 1888-1902: The Example of Aberdare". Welsh History Review. 14 (3): 399–416.
