= 1899 Aberdare Urban District Council election =

1899 Welsh local government election

The Aberdare Urban District Council was established in 1894 and covered the parish of Aberdare. Its responsibilities included public health, sanitation, roads and public works generally.

There were five wards, namely Aberaman (also known as No. 5 Ward), Blaengwawr (also known as No. 4 Ward), Gadlys (also known as No. 2 Ward), Llwydcoed (also known as No. 1 Ward), and the Town Ward (also known as No. 3 Ward). At this time, one member was elected from each ward on an annual basis.

An election was held in April 1899. It was preceded by the 1898 election and followed by the 1900 election. The term of office of members elected at the 1896 election came to an end and those elected were to serve until 1902.

(*) denotes sitting member

== Results by ward ==
=== Aberaman Ward ===
Aberaman Ward
Party	Candidate	Votes	%	±%
	John Bucknell	481		
	James Ray	302		
	John Williams	257		
	John Reardon	213		
	Josiah Hawk	53		

=== Blaengwawr Ward ===
Blaengwawr Ward
Party	Candidate	Votes	%	±%
	John Howell*	unopposed		

=== Gadlys Ward ===
Gadlys Ward
Party	Candidate	Votes	%	±%
	W.T. Morgan	846		
	Griffith George*	362		

=== Llwydcoed Ward ===
Llwydcoed Ward
Party	Candidate	Votes	%	±%
	Owen Harries*	unopposed		

=== Town Ward ===
Town Ward
Party	Candidate	Votes	%	±%
	Lewis Noah Williams*	unopposed		

== Bibliography ==
- Jones, Ieuan Gwynedd (1981). Explorations & Explanations. Essays in the Social History of Victorian Wales. Llandysul: Gomer. ISBN 0 85088 644 9.
- Jones, Ieuan Gwynedd (1987). Communities. Essays in the Social History of Victorian Wales. Llandysul: Gomer. ISBN 0 86383 223 7.
- Morgan, Kenneth O (1991). Wales in British Politics 1868-1922. Cardiff: University of Wales Press. ISBN 0708311245.
- Parry, Jon (1989). "Labour Leaders and Local Politics 1888-1902: The Example of Aberdare". Welsh History Review. 14 (3): 399–416.
