= 1902 Aberdare Urban District Council election =

1902 Welsh local government election

The Aberdare Urban District Council was established in 1894 and covered the parish of Aberdare. Its responsibilities included public health, sanitation, roads and public works generally.

There were five wards, namely Aberaman (also known as No. 5 Ward), Blaengwawr (also known as No. 4 Ward), Gadlys (also known as No. 2 Ward), Llwydcoed (also known as No. 1 Ward), and the Town Ward (also known as No. 3 Ward). At this time, one member was elected from each ward on an annual basis.

An election was held in April 1902. It was preceded by the 1901 election and followed by the 1903 election. The term of office of members elected at the 1899 election came to an end and those elected were to serve until 1905. There were contested elections in three of the five wards.

(*) denotes sitting member

== Results by ward ==
=== Aberaman Ward ===
Aberaman Ward 1902
Party	Candidate	Votes	%	±%
	John Bucknell*	830		
	J. Davies	683		
Majority		392		
		Swing		

=== Blaengwawr Ward ===
Blaengwawr Ward 1902
Party	Candidate	Votes	%	±%
	John Howell*	unopposed		

=== Gadlys Ward ===
Gadlys Ward 1902
Party	Candidate	Votes	%	±%
	W.T. Morgan*	874		
Labour	Evan Parker	420		
Majority		454		
		Swing		

=== Llwydcoed Ward ===
Llwydcoed Ward 1902
Party	Candidate	Votes	%	±%
	Owen Harris*	unopposed		

=== Town Ward ===
Town Ward 1902
Party	Candidate	Votes	%	±%
	Lewis Noah Williams*	841		
	R.L. Berry	473		
Majority		368		
		Swing		

== Bibliography ==
- Jones, Ieuan Gwynedd (1981). Explorations & Explanations. Essays in the Social History of Victorian Wales. Llandysul: Gomer. ISBN 0 85088 644 9.
- Jones, Ieuan Gwynedd (1987). Communities. Essays in the Social History of Victorian Wales. Llandysul: Gomer. ISBN 0 86383 223 7.
