= Owen Harris =

Welsh politician (1837–1905)

Owen Harris (1837 – January 1905) was a Liberal politician and municipal leader in Aberdare, South Wales.

== Early life ==
Harris was born in Llanddeusant, Carmarthenshire, but as a young man migrated to Ystalyfera in the Swansea Valley and later to Aberdare, where he opened a grocer's business in Harriet Street, Trecynon. At this time, Trecynon was a growing industrial community, and Harris was one of a number of enterprising tradesmen from rural Wales who established businesses in Harriet Street. By 1870 he was sufficiently well-established to be contributing 5/- to a testimonial for the minister at Heolyfelin Chapel (see below). In later years he established branches of his business at Mill Street and Llwydcoed, the former being managed by his son, Morgan J. Harris.

== Public life ==
Harris was a prominent member of the Liberal Party in Aberdare but was regarded as Progressive in politics. In effect this meant that he supported closer links with the labour movement.

His earliest known involvement was in 1879 when he was part of a deputation of tradesmen and working men who attended a meeting at Swansea to request Richard Fothergill, one of the two sitting members to offer himself once again as a candidate for the Merthyr Boroughs. Fothergill eventually declined the invitation. Leaders of the Baptist denomination in the Aberdare Valley, most notably Thomas Price, had been instrumental in securing Fothergill's election for Merthyr Boroughs, alongside Henry Richard in 1868. It is, therefore, significant that Harris, as a prominent Baptist as well as a tradesman, was a member of the deputation.

The following year, Harris was elected as a representative of the North Ward of Aberdare on the Merthyr Tydfil Board of Guardians. The following year, four candidates were again nominated for the three seats. It was agreed that lots would be drawn to determine who should serve as guardians and Harris was one of those successful.

From this time onwards Harris was involved in the municipal life of Aberdare and served on several public bodies including the Aberdare School Board and the Merthyr Tydfil Board of Guardians. In 1886, he was elected to the Aberdare Local Board of Health. He was re-elected in 1889, defeating two colliery managers.

In 1892, there were rumours, immediately denied by Harris' supporters that he intended to contest the Hirwaun ward in the county council election against the sitting member, Rev Richard Morgan.

When the Local Board was merged into the Aberdare Urban District Council in 1894, he was returned as a member for Llwydcoed. He was re-elected unopposed in 1896, 1899 and 1902. Upon his death, his son was elected in his place.

== Religious affiliation ==
Harris was originally a Calvinistic Methodist, but at Aberdare he became a Baptist. He was a deacon and a prominent figure at Heolyfelin Baptist Church, Trecynon, served as chairman of the East Glamorgan Baptist Association.

== Death ==
Harris died in January 1905 and fulsome tributes were paid by fellow members of the Aberdare District Council. He was buried at the Aberdare Cemetery and a large number of mainly Baptist ministers and laymen took part in the proceedings, including Edward Thomas (Cochfarf). Harris left over £8,000 in his will. most of which was inherited by his son, Morgan and, in addition he owned at least seven houses in Trecynon.

At the Trecynon Eisteddfod in 1907, a prize was offered for verses in memory of Harris and the prize was awarded by Harris's fellow Liberal, Griffith George (Gruffydd Dyfed) to the only competitor.

== Bibliography ==
- Jones, Ieuan Gwynedd (1964). "Dr. Thomas Price and the election of 1868 in Merthyr Tydfil : a study in nonconformist politics (Part One)". Welsh History Review. 2 (2): 147–172.
- Jones, Ieuan Gwynedd (1965). "Dr Thomas Price and the election of 1868 in Merthyr Tydfil : a study in nonconformist politics (Part Two)". Welsh History Review. 2 (3): 251–70.
- Parry, Jon (1989). "Labour Leaders and Local Politics 1888–1902: The Example of Aberdare". Welsh History Review. 14 (3): 399–416.
