= Blaengwawr (electoral ward) =

Former electoral ward in Wales

Blaengwawr was, for much of the twentieth century, an electoral ward for the purposes of electing members to Glamorgan County Council and the Aberdare Urban District Council. Blaengwawr no longer forms an electoral ward and is part of Aberaman.

Blaengwawr became an electoral ward in the late nineteenth century with the formation of Glamorgan County Council. Blaengwawr was also one of the five electoral wards of the Aberdare Urban District Council from its formation in 1894. The other wards were Aberaman, Aberdare Town, Gadlys and Llwydcoed.

== History 1889-1914 ==
Blaengwawr first became an electoral ward in the late nineteenth century with the formation of Aberdare Urban District Council. From 1895, Blaengwawr was also an electoral ward for the purposes of elections to Glamorgan County Council following reorganisation of wards in the Aberdare area.

=== Glamorgan County Council ===
In 1895, John Howell, who was already a district councillor, became the first member to represent the ward.

Blaengwawr 1895
Party	Candidate	Votes	%	±%
Liberal	John Howell	unopposed		

Howell was again elected unopposed in 1898

Blaengwawr 1898
Party	Candidate	Votes	%	±%
Liberal	John Howell*	unopposed		

In 1901, Howell appears to have been again returned without opposition although the result cannot be traced.

Blaengwawr 1901
Party	Candidate	Votes	%	±%
Liberal	John Howell*	unopposed		

At the 1904 election, Howell was opposed by another Liberal candidate, Gwilym Treharne, who came within 71 votes of victory.

Blaengwawr 1904
Party	Candidate	Votes	%	±%
Liberal	John Howell*	610		
Liberal	Gwilym Alexander Treharne	539		
Majority		71		
Liberal hold		Swing		

Treharne intended to oppose Howell again in 1907 but withdrew before the poll.

Blaengwawr 1907
Party	Candidate	Votes	%	±%
Liberal	John Howell*	unopposed		
Liberal hold		Swing		

In 1910, however, Treharne finally succeeded in ousting Howell, who lost his seat after fifteen years.

Blaengwawr 1910
Party	Candidate	Votes	%	±%
Liberal	Gwilym Alexander Treharne	696		
Liberal	John Howell*	624		
Majority		72		
Liberal hold		Swing		

It can be seen, therefore, that Labour made no challenge for this seat at county level. The position in district election was, however, a different one.

=== Aberdare Urban District Council ===
Blaengwawr was also an electoral ward of the Aberdare Urban District Council from its formation in 1894.

Blaengwawr Ward 1894
Party	Candidate	Votes	%	±%
	Morgan John	767		
	David Price Davies	600		
	John Howell	549		
	John Simon	422		

Blaengwawr Ward 1896
Party	Candidate	Votes	%	±%
	John Howell*	unopposed		

In 1899, John Howell was again returned unopposed.

Blaengwawr Ward
Party	Candidate	Votes	%	±%
	John Howell*	unopposed		

In 1900, David Price Davies was returned without opposition.

Blaengwawr Ward 1900
Party	Candidate	Votes	%	±%
	David Price Davies*	unopposed		

In 1901, Llewellyn was re-elected by a large majority.

Llwydcoed Ward 1901
Party	Candidate	Votes	%	±%
	Rees Llewellyn*	825		
	W. Williams	291		

The 1902 result cannot be traced but in 1903, J.W. Evans was re-elected unopposed.

Llwydcoed Ward
Party	Candidate	Votes	%	±%
	John William Evans*	unopposed		

In 1904 an additional seat was created, allowing T. Walter Williams to be returned alongside Rees Llewellyn.

Llwydcoed Ward 1904
Party	Candidate	Votes	%	±%
	Rees Llewellyn*	872		
	T. Walter Williams	866		
	William Williams	238		
	Joseph Morgan	177		
	James Berry	125		
