= Thomas Humphreys (Baptist minister) =

Thomas Humphreys was minister of Seion, Cwmaman, from the 1860s until his death in 1909. During this time the church developed into one of the strongest associations in the village. He was eventually succeeded by S. J. Leeke.

He was also active in local politics and became a member of the Aberdare Local Board of Health. From 1894 he was an inaugural member of the Aberdare Urban District Council, being elected in second place in the Aberaman ward behind E.M. Hann. Humphreys was re-elected unopposed in 1897 and 1900. In 1903, however, he lost his seat to a Labour candidate because of an alleged lack of sympathy with the working classes.
