= 1901 Glamorgan County Council election =

1901 Welsh local government election

The 1901 Glamorgan County Council election was the fifth contest for seats on this authority in south Wales. It was preceded by the 1898 election and followed by the 1904 election. Glamorgan was by far the largest county in Wales in terms of population. Glamorgan County Council had been established by the Local Government Act 1888, the first elections being held in early 1889.

== Overview of the result ==
As in most parts of Wales, the Liberal Party was once again triumphant and won a majority of the seats. In 1901 the majority of the seats were uncontested, in contrast to the position at previous elections.

Results are drawn from a number of sources. They include a number of newspapers.

== Boundary changes ==
There were no boundary changes at this election.

== Retiring aldermen ==
Eight of the eleven retiring aldermen were Liberals.

== Results by ward ==
=== Aberaman ===
Aberaman
Party	Candidate	Votes	%	±%
Liberal	Thomas Davies			
Majority				
Liberal hold		Swing		

=== Aberavon ===
Aberavon 1901
Party	Candidate	Votes	%	±%
Conservative	John Morgan Smith*	unopposed		

=== Aberdare Town ===
David Price Davies, a member of the Council since 1889 and an alderman from 1892 until 1898 was defeated.

Aberdare Town 1901
Party	Candidate	Votes	%	±%
Liberal	David Hughes	709		
Liberal	David Price Davies*	488		
Liberal hold		Swing		

=== Barry ===
Barry 1901
Party	Candidate	Votes	%	±%
Conservative	Captain Hamilton Murrell*	unopposed		
Conservative hold		Swing		

=== Blaengwawr ===
Blaengwawr 1898
Party	Candidate	Votes	%	±%
Liberal	John Howell*	unopposed		

=== Cadoxton ===
Cadoxton 1901
Party	Candidate	Votes	%	±%
Liberal	Dr P.J. O' Donnell	unopposed		
Liberal hold		Swing		

=== Bridgend ===
Bridgend 1898
Party	Candidate	Votes	%	±%
Independent	John Morgan Randall	unopposed		
Independent gain from Liberal		Swing		

=== Briton Ferry ===
Jenkin Hill recaptured the seat he lost three years previously.

Briton Ferry 1901
Party	Candidate	Votes	%	±%
Liberal	Jenkin Hill*	unopposed		
Liberal hold		Swing		

=== Caeharris ===
Caeharris 1898
Party	Candidate	Votes	%	±%
Unionist	Edward Pritchard Martin	unopposed		

=== Caerphilly ===
Caerphilly
Party	Candidate	Votes	%	±%
Conservative	H.E. Morgan Lindsay	864		
Liberal	Richard Hill Male	488		
Majority		365		
Conservative hold		Swing		

=== Cilfynydd ===
Cilfynydd 1901
Party	Candidate	Votes	%	±%
Liberal	William Roberts Davies*	Unopposed		
Liberal hold		Swing		

=== Coedffranc ===
Coedffranc 1901
Party	Candidate	Votes	%	±%
Liberal	William Howell	unopposed		
Liberal gain from Conservative		Swing		

=== Coity ===
Coity 1898
Party	Candidate	Votes	%	±%
Liberal	William Howell*	unopposed		
Liberal hold		Swing		

=== Cowbridge ===
Cowbridge
Party	Candidate	Votes	%	±%
Conservative	R.T. Bassett	unopposed		
Conservative hold		Swing		

=== Cwmavon ===
Two Liberals, a sitting alderman and sitting councillor, opposed each other.

Cwmavon
Party	Candidate	Votes	%	±%
Liberal	Herbert Evans*	unopposed		
Liberal hold		Swing		

=== Cyfarthfa ===
Thomas Thomas recaptured the seat he lost three years previously.

Cyfarthfa 1898
Party	Candidate	Votes	%	±%
Lib-Lab	Thomas Thomas*	515		
Liberal	Thomas Davies	266		
Majority				
Lib-Lab gain from Liberal		Swing		

=== Cymmer ===
Cymmer 1901
Party	Candidate	Votes	%	±%
Liberal	Morgan Williams*	unopposed		
Liberal hold		Swing		

=== Dinas Powys ===
Dinas Powys 1901
Party	Candidate	Votes	%	±%
Conservative	Oliver Henry Jones*	unopposed		
Conservative hold		Swing		

=== Dowlais ===
Dowlais 1901
Party	Candidate	Votes	%	±%
Lib-Lab	John Davies*	Unopposed	N/A	N/A
Lib-Lab hold				

=== Dulais Valley ===
Dulais Valley
Party	Candidate	Votes	%	±%
Conservative	Evan Evans Bevan*	unopposed		
Conservative hold		Swing		

=== Ferndale ===
Three candidates were nominated to contest the vacancy left by the former member, Rev Silas Charles, who had moved to Cardiff.

Ferndale 1898
Party	Candidate	Votes	%	±%
Liberal	Rev Silas Charles	778		
Liberal	Thomas Samuel	629		

=== Gadlys ===
Charles Kenshole, elected unopposed in 1898 was defeated.

Gadlys 1901
Party	Candidate	Votes	%	±%
Lib-Lab	A.S. Pleace	423		
	Evan Parker	380		
	Charles Kenshole*	249		
Majority		43		
Lib-Lab hold		Swing		

=== Garw Valley ===
Garw Valley 1901
Party	Candidate	Votes	%	±%
Liberal	John Thomas*	Unopposed	N/A	N/A

=== Gellifaelog ===
Gellifaelog
Party	Candidate	Votes	%	±%
Liberal	Evan Lewis*	unopposed		

=== Gelligaer ===
Gelligaer
Party	Candidate	Votes	%	±%
Independent	Henry William Martin	unopposed		

=== Gower ===
Gower 1901
Party	Candidate	Votes	%	±%
	George E. Gordon*	unopposed		

=== Kibbor ===
Kibbor
Party	Candidate	Votes	%	±%
Conservative	Henry Lewis*	unopposed		

=== Llandaff ===
Llandaff
Party	Candidate	Votes	%	±%
Conservative	Robert Forrest*	unopposed		

=== Llandeilo Talybont ===
Llandeilo Talybont 1898
Party	Candidate	Votes	%	±%
Liberal	Rees Harries*	unopposed		

=== Llansamlet ===
Llansamlet 1901
Party	Candidate	Votes	%	±%
Conservative	John Jordan*	unopposed		

=== Llantrisant ===
Llantrisant
Party	Candidate	Votes	%	±%
Liberal	J. Blandy Jenkins*	unopposed		

=== Llwydcoed ===
Rees Llewellyn, prominent industrialist and member of Aberdare Urban District Council won the seat.

Llwydcoed 1901
Party	Candidate	Votes	%	±%
Liberal	Rees Llewellyn	759		
	T. Lewis	289		

=== Llwynypia and Clydach ===
Llwynypia and Clydach 1901
Party	Candidate	Votes	%	±%
Liberal	Richard Lewis*	unopposed		

=== Lougher and Penderry ===
Loughor and Penderry 1901
Party	Candidate	Votes	%	±%
Conservative	Sir J.T.D. Llewellyn**	unopposed		

=== Maesteg ===
The same two candidates had faced each other in 1895. On that occasion, Barrow had won and was elected as alderman for a three-year period. Jenkin Jones was then returned at a by-election.

Maesteg
Party	Candidate	Votes	%	±%
Liberal	Jenkin Jones*	972		
Liberal	James Barrow**	842		

=== Margam ===
The previous councillor, Edward Knox, was said to have left the district. D.R. David was the owner of the Taibach Tinplate Works and a prominent figure in the public life of the district.

Margam 1901
Party	Candidate	Votes	%	±%
	D.R. David	unopposed		

=== Merthyr Town ===
Merthyr Town
Party	Candidate	Votes	%	±%
Conservative	J.W. Lewis	706		
Liberal	Alfred Edwards	597		

=== Merthyr Vale ===
Merthyr Vale
Party	Candidate	Votes	%	±%
Liberal	David Prosser	538		
Liberal	Walter Bell	523		
Majority		153		

=== Morriston ===
Morriston 1901
Party	Candidate	Votes	%	±%
Liberal	William John Percy Player	Unopposed		
Liberal hold				

=== Mountain Ash ===
Mountain Ash
Party	Candidate	Votes	%	±%
Liberal	Thomas Morris	549		
Liberal	Samuel Evans	459		
Liberal	John Lewis	316		
Majority		90		
Liberal hold		Swing		

=== Neath (North) ===
Neath (North) 1901
Party	Candidate	Votes	%	±%
Unionist	Hopkin Morgan*	Unopposed		
Unionist hold				

=== Neath (South) ===
At the previous election, Trick had stood as a Conservative.

Neath (South) 1901
Party	Candidate	Votes	%	±%
Independent	W.B. Trick*	Unopposed		
Independent gain from Liberal		Swing		

=== Newcastle ===
Newcastle 1898
Party	Candidate	Votes	%	±%
Liberal	Thomas J. Hughes	unopposed		
Liberal hold		Swing		

=== Ogmore ===
Ogmore 1898
Party	Candidate	Votes	%	±%
Conservative	J.D. Nicholl	unopposed		
Conservative hold		Swing		

=== Ogmore Valley ===
Ogmore Valley 1898
Party	Candidate	Votes	%	±%
Liberal	William Llewellyn*	unopposed		
Liberal hold		Swing		

=== Oystermouth ===
Oystermouth 1901
Party	Candidate	Votes	%	±%
	T.W. James	unopposed		
		Swing		

=== Penarth North ===
Penarth North
Party	Candidate	Votes	%	±%
Liberal	W.B. Shepherd*	377		
	J.L. Norris	240		
Liberal hold		Swing		

=== Penarth South ===
Penarth South 1901
Party	Candidate	Votes	%	±%
	Frederick Henry Jotham*	unopposed		

=== Penrhiwceiber ===
Penrhiwceiber
Party	Candidate	Votes	%	±%
	Dr. R. W. Jones	unopposed		
	Liberal hold	Swing		

=== Pentre ===
Morris appears to have defected to the Unionists, leading to his defeat.

Pentre 1901
Party	Candidate	Votes	%	±%
Liberal	Elias Henry Davies	unopposed		
Liberal hold		Swing		

=== Penydarren ===
Penydarren
Party	Candidate	Votes	%	±%
Liberal	David Davies*	516		
Conservative	T.E. Morgan	270		
Majority		146		

=== Pontardawe ===
Pontardawe 1901
Party	Candidate	Votes	%	±%
Conservative	Frank W. Gilbertson*	unopposed		

=== Plymouth ===
Plymouth
Party	Candidate	Votes	%	±%
Liberal	Henry W. Lewis*	603		
Conservative	A. Daniel	440		

=== Pontlottyn ===
Although a Liberal gain, the shock was the defeat of Alderman Aaron Davies.

Pontlottyn 1898
Party	Candidate	Votes	%	±%
Liberal	Alfred Phillips	570		
Liberal	Rev Aaron Davies**	355		
Liberal gain from Conservative		Swing		

=== Pontypridd ===
Pontypridd 1901
Party	Candidate	Votes	%	±%
Liberal	Walter H. Morgan**	unopposed		

=== Porth and Penygraig ===
Porth and Penygraig 1901
Party	Candidate	Votes	%	±%
Liberal	J. Jones Griffiths**	unopposed		
Liberal hold		Swing		

=== Resolven ===
Resolven 1901
Party	Candidate	Votes	%	±%
Liberal	Daniel Evans**	unopposed		
Liberal hold		Swing		

=== Sketty ===
John Davies had been defeated in the two previous elections but was now returned unopposed.

Sketty 1901
Party	Candidate	Votes	%	±%
Liberal	Rev John Davies	unopposed		
Liberal gain from Conservative		Swing		

=== Clydach ===
Clydach 1901
Party	Candidate	Votes	%	±%
Liberal	Thomas Jones*	unopposed		
Liberal hold		Swing		

=== Treforest ===
James Roberts had won the seat at a by-election following the death of the previous member, David Leyshon

Treforest 1898
Party	Candidate	Votes	%	±%
Independent	Samuel Evans	671		
Liberal	James Roberts*	614		
Majority		57		

=== Treherbert ===
Treherbert 1901
Party	Candidate	Votes	%	±%
Liberal	William Morgan**	unopposed		
Liberal hold		Swing		

=== Treorchy ===
Treorchy 1901
Party	Candidate	Votes	%	±%
Lib-Lab	Daronwy Isaac*	Unopposed	N/A	N/A
Lib-Lab hold				

=== Trealaw and Tonypandy ===
Tonypandy 1901
Party	Candidate	Votes	%	±%
Liberal	D.W. Davies*	unopposed		
Liberal hold		Swing		

=== Tylorstown and Ynyshir ===
Tylorstown and Ynyshir 1898
Party	Candidate	Votes	%	±%
Liberal	T.H. Morris*	unopposed		
Liberal hold		Swing		

=== Ystalyfera ===
Ystalyfera
Party	Candidate	Votes	%	±%
Conservative	Dr David Thomas*	unopposed		
Conservative hold		Swing		

=== Ystrad ===
Clifford Cory

Ystrad 1901
Party	Candidate	Votes	%	±%
Liberal	Clifford John Cory*	unopposed		
Liberal hold		Swing		

== Election of aldermen ==
In addition to the 66 councillors the council consisted of 22 county aldermen. Aldermen were elected by the council, and served a six-year term. Following the 1901 election, there were eleven Aldermanic vacancies.

The following aldermen were appointed by the newly elected council. A notable feature was the non-election of Sir John Llewelyn, an alderman since 1889. As a result, there were no Conservative aldermen on Glamorgan County Council, the first time that this had occurred.

elected for six years

- Richard Lewis, Liberal (elected councillor at Llwynypia and Clydach)
- Walter H. Morgan, Liberal, retiring alderman (elected councillor at Pontypridd)
- John Jones Griffiths, Liberal, retiring alderman (elected councillor at Porth)
- William Morgan, Liberal, retiring alderman (elected councillor at Treherbert)
- Thomas Williams
- John Thomas, Liberal-Labour (elected councillor at Garw Valley)
- Morgan Williams, Liberal, Ynyshir
- Edward Edwards, Liberal, Nelson
- Thomas Thomas, Liberal, Merthyr
- Thomas Jones, Liberal, Swansea Valley
- Jenkin Hill, Liberal (elected councillor at Briton Ferry)

== Bibliography ==
- Parry, Jon (1989). "Labour Leaders and Local Politics 1888-1902: The Example of Aberdare". Welsh History Review. 14 (3): 399–416.
- Williams, Chris (1996). Democratic Rhondda: Politics and society 1885-1951. Cardiff: University of Wales Press.
