= Edmund Stonelake =

Edmund Stonelake (5 April 1873 – 5 April 1960) was a Welsh local politician and a prominent figure in establishing the Labour Party in Aberdare and the Merthyr Boroughs parliamentary constituency. He was a local councillor for many years and a close associate of James Keir Hardie.

== Early life ==
Stonelake was born in Pontlottyn in the Rhymney Valley but came to Aberdare with his widowed mother around 1888.

== Public life ==
Stonelake elected unopposed to the Aberdare Urban District Council in 1904. He retained his seat in 1907. He became chairman of the Council 1910. During the pre-war period he was a prominent advocate of building council houses, a programme that commenced before the First World War and continued thereafter. In 1922, however, he was forced to resign from the authority following a corruption scandal.

== Later career ==
Stonelake was ultimately exonerated of any wrongdoing in the above episode and remained active in public life and the Labour party for many years, although he never resumed his career as an elected representative.
