= Aberaman (electoral ward) =

Electoral division in Rhondda Cynon Taf, Wales

Aberaman is an electoral ward in Rhondda Cynon Taf, Wales. It was an electoral ward for much of the twentieth century, for the purposes of electing members to Glamorgan County Council and the Aberdare Urban District Council. The village of Aberaman was subsequently covered by two electoral wards, Aberaman North and Aberaman South, for the purposes of electing members to the Rhondda Cynon Taf County Borough Council. Aberaman North was composed mainly of Aberaman itself while Aberaman South included Abercwmboi, Cwmaman, Godreaman and Glynhafod.

Aberaman first became an electoral ward in the late nineteenth century with the formation of Glamorgan County Council. Aberaman was also one of the five electoral wards of the Aberdare Urban District Council from its formation in 1894. The other wards were Aberdare Town, Blaengwawr, Gadlys and Llwydcoed.

== History 1889-1914 ==
Representation of the ward in the 1890s was dominated by supporters of the Liberal Party although elections were often not fought on political lines and the local influence and standing of individual candidates was an important factor. This enabled Edmund Mills Hann, a prominent figure in the Powell Duffryn company, although unsuccessful at county level in 1889, to hold a seat on the Aberdare UDC for most of this period. Significantly he continued to hold a seat at Aberaman after the Labour Party captured several of the district seats in the early years of the new century. One of the most significant contests was that in 1903 (see below) for the Aberdare UDC when William Rees, a Labour candidate and deacon, unseated Thomas Humphreys, minister of Seion, Cwmaman.

=== Glamorgan County Council 1889-1914 ===
In 1889, Thomas Philip White was elected as Liberal member for Aberaman, defeating Edmund Mills Hann. This contest was widely reported and was a significant victory for a local tradesman, T.P. White, over a leading colliery official who later became a prominent figure in the South Wales and Monmouthshire Coalowners' Association. White had been chosen as Liberal candidate after a public meeting at Saron Chapel, Aberaman. In a letter to the press he referred to pressure from colliery officials and sought to re-assure the electors that there was a secret ballot.

Aberaman 1889
Party	Candidate	Votes	%	±%
Liberal	Thomas Phillip White	769	61.6	
Conservative	Edmund Mills Hann	480	38.4	
Majority		289	23.2	
Liberal win (new seat)				

The result of the first election was regarded with surprise in some quarters and one local newspaper predicted that would be successful in the by-election. He was, however, defeated by Thomas Davies of Abercwmboi.

Aberaman by-election 1889
Party	Candidate	Votes	%	±%
Liberal	Thomas Davies	675		
Conservative	Edmund Mills Hann	549		
Majority		126		
Liberal hold		Swing		

Thomas Davies was re-elected in 1892. Following the elevation of T.P. White to the aldermanic bench. White had moved from Cwmaman to Maesycymmer during the intervening period and did not seek re-election.

Aberaman 1892
Party	Candidate	Votes	%	±%
Liberal	Thomas Davies*	unopposed		
Liberal hold		Swing		

Davies was again re-elected in 1895. He was opposed by Thomas Rees, landlord of the Swan Hotel, Aberaman and elected a member of the Aberdare Urban District Council at the inaugural 1894 election. The Merthyr Times opined that there was no necessity for a contest, and that the unsuccessful candidate had wasted his time and money.

Aberaman 1895
Party	Candidate	Votes	%	±%
Liberal	Thomas Davies*	481		
Independent	Thomas Rees	375		
Majority		106		
Liberal hold		Swing		

The results for 1898 and 1901 are unavailable but by 1904, Luther Davies, a manager at the Aberaman Colliery had taken over as the county councillor for Aberaman.

Aberaman 1904
Party	Candidate	Votes	%	±%
Liberal	Thomas Luther Davies	unopposed		
Liberal hold		Swing		

Davies was again re-elected unopposed in 1907

Aberaman 1907
Party	Candidate	Votes	%	±%
Liberal	Thomas Luther Davies*	unopposed		
Liberal hold		Swing		

Despite the challenge of the Labour Party at district council level, including a significant impact at Aberaman (see below), labour did not challenge for the county seat in this period.

=== Aberdare Urban District Council ===
Aberaman was also an electoral ward of the Aberdare Urban District Council from its formation in 1894.

Aberaman Ward 1894
Party	Candidate	Votes	%	±%
	Edmund Mills Hann	697		
	Rev Thomas Humphreys	645		
	Thomas Rees	428		
Lib-Lab	Phillip Daniel Rees	368		

Thomas Rees, landlord of the Swan Inn, Aberaman and a long-standing member of the Aberdare Local Board of Health prior to the formation of the district council, had run unsuccessfully for the county council the previous year but had been defeated by the sitting member, Thomas Davies of Abercwmboi. Hr narrowly held hid seat against another Liberal candidate.

Aberaman Ward 1896
Party	Candidate	Votes	%	±%
Liberal	Thomas Rees*	583		
Liberal	Dr D. Davies Jones	561		

In 1899 there was a four-cornered contest.

Aberaman Ward
Party	Candidate	Votes	%	±%
	John Bucknell	481		
	James Ray	302		
	John Williams	257		
	John Reardon	213		
	Josiah Hawk	53		

In 1900, Thomas Humphreys was again returned unopposed.

Aberaman Ward 1900
Party	Candidate	Votes	%	±%
	Rev Thomas Humphreys*	unopposed		

In 1901, E.M. Hann was opposed by a Labour candidate.

Aberaman Ward 1901
Party	Candidate	Votes	%	±%
	Edmund Mills Hann*	1,025		
Labour	T.R. Edwards	411		

The 1902 election saw John Bucknell re-elected.

Aberaman Ward 1902
Party	Candidate	Votes	%	±%
	John Bucknell*	830		
	J. Davies	683		
Majority		392		

In 1903 Thomas Humphreys was defeated, having been criticised for his lack of support for the working classes.

Aberaman Ward
Party	Candidate	Votes	%	±%
Labour	William Rees	1,013	65.9	
Liberal	Rev Thomas Humphreys*	525	34.1	

The creation of a second seat in 1904 saw the return of Charles Stanton alongside E.M. Hann. The vicar of Aberaman was beaten into third place.

Aberaman Ward
Party	Candidate	Votes	%	±%
	Edmund Mills Hann*	1,156		
Labour	Charles B. Stanton	796		
	Morgan Powell	565		

On John Bucknell's retirement in 1905, the vicar made another attempt to win the seat but was defeated by a Labour candidate.

Aberaman Ward 1905
Party	Candidate	Votes	%	±%
Labour	John Davies	862		
	Morgan Powell	601		
	John Evans	20		
Majority		261		

== 21st century ==
Until 2022 the community of Aberaman had two wards, Aberaman North and Aberaman South for the purposes of Rhondda Cynon Taf County Borough Council elections. Since 1995 it had been represented by Plaid Cymru and Labour councillors.

A 2018 review of electoral arrangements by the Local Democracy and Boundary Commission for Wales would see North and South merged to recreate a single county borough ward of Aberaman. The proposals would take effect from the 2022 council elections.

=== 2022 election ===
Three Labour councillors were comfortably elected at the May 2022 elections:

2022 RCT County Borough election (3 seats)
Party	Candidate	Votes	%	±%
Labour	Julie Cook	1,518		
Labour	Sheryl Evans	1,447		
Labour	Tina Williams	1,472		
Plaid Cymru	Julie Williams	870		
Conservative	Andrew Clarke	320		
Turnout				

Evans had formerly been a councillor for Aberaman North, while Tina Williams had been a councillor for Aberaman South.
