= Seion Chapel, Cwmaman =

Chapel in Cwmaman, Rhondda Cynon Taf, Wales

Coordinates: 51.6858°N 3.4427°W

Seion, Cwmaman
- Seion, Cwmaman
- Location: Cwmneol Street, Cwmaman
- Country: Wales
- Denomination: Baptist

History
- Founded: 1859

Architecture
- Architectural type: Chapel
- Style: Late 19th century
- Closed: 2013

Seion, Cwmaman is a Welsh Baptist church, originally established in 1859. The chapel closed in 2013 but the church still meets at another location in the village.

== Early history ==
The church dates from the early days of Cwmaman as a mining community. The first prayer meetings are said to have been held at the house of a John Weeks in Fforchaman Road and were mainly attended by members of Gwawr, Aberaman. The chapel was built in 1858–9, largely by the members themselves, and cost £300. It was rebuilt in 1870 at a cost of £425 and again in 1891 at a cost of £1,787.

The first ministers were Ebenezer Morgan (1859–64) and T. T. Davies (1864–66).

== The Pastorate of Thomas Humphreys ==
In 1868 Thomas Humphreys became the minister, and served until 1910. He baptised 1,700 members during his 42-year tenure and died in 1911. Humphreys was a founder member of Aberdare Urban District Council and a trustee of Cwmaman Public Hall.

The 1904-05 revival had a profound impact at Seion, with many attenders who had been present as listeners for decades becoming full members of the church.,

Humphreys was succeeded by W.R. Lewis, who remained until 1914 when he moved to Hill Park Chapel, Haverfordwest.

== The Pastorate of S.J. Leeke ==
On 14 February 1916, S. J. Leeke was ordained minister of Seion. Leeke was a native of Talybont, Cardiganshire and trained for the ministry at the South Wales Baptist College, Cardiff. He began his ministry at the Public Hall after the chapel was severely damaged by a storm in January of that year.

== Later history ==
After S.J. Leeke departed for Brynamman in 1925, Seion was without a minister for four years. D. Myrddin Davies commenced his ministry in 1929 and remained for seven years before moving to Bethel, Aberystwyth. T. Jones-Evans was minister from 1927 until 1943, when he moved to Calfaria, Login, in Carmarthenshire. Harding G. Rees served from 1944 to 1955 and was succeeded by Garfield Eynon in 1956. During Eynon's ministry the church celebrated its centenary. Eynon moved to Ebenezer, Ammanford in 1962.

John Lewis was minister during the 1970s but moved to Drefach (Carmarthenshire) in 1978.

The last minister at Seion was Gwilym Davies, who was inducted as minister of Seion together with Hengoed, Bryn Seion (Ystrad Mynach) and Noddfa (Ynysybwl) in 1986. Seion remained an active church until the early 21st century.

== Bibliography ==
- Jones, Alan Vernon (2004). Chapels of the Cynon Valley. Cynon Valley Historical Society. ISBN 0953107612.
- Parry, R. Ifor (1964). "Crefydd yng Nghwm Aberdar, a Chyfraniad y Bedyddwyr". Undeb Bedyddwyr Cymru, Aberdar (in Welsh): 15–61.
- Undeb Bedyddwyr Cymru, Y Rhos, Aberpennar (in Welsh). 1947.
- Undeb Bedyddwyr Cymru, Aberdâr (in Welsh). 1964.
