= Aberdare Local Board of Health =

Former health board in south Wales

Aberdare Local Board of Health was established in 1854 in response to the 1848 Public Health Act, and a report on the sanitary condition of the town conducted by Thomas Webster Rammell. It was eventually replaced in 1894 by Aberdare Urban District Council.

The challenges facing a rapidly developing urban community were a concern to the relatively small middle class of Aberdare as well as the more community-spirited of the industrialists. One of the leading figures in persuading the community to adopt the Health of Town Acts was the nonconformist minister, Thomas Price. The first board, elected in 1854, included David Davis, Blaengwawr, Crawshay Bailey, Thomas Price and Richard Fothergill who became its first chairman. 'We hope', reflected a local newspaper, 'after so much delay, that active measures will now be taken immediately, as a very wide field for exertion is open to the board'. Cholera was the main concern and although, at that stage, there had been no cases at Aberdare, there had been an outbreak at nearby Hirwaun.

The main challenge in the early years was dealing with cholera outbreaks and the rapidly developing industrial community.

At the end of its first year, four members of the Board were to retire and seek re-election and it was proposed by Thomas Price, and agreed by the other members, that they would seek to secure their return. Fothergill was re-elected chairman in August 1855.

In 1866, Thomas Price, after an absence of some years, resumed his membership of the Board, heading the poll ahead of David Davis. William Thomas Lewis, later Lord Merthyr, was also elected to the Board for the first time.

== Board of Health Elections ==
=== 1854 Election ===
Elected: David Davies; Thomas Joseph; Rev. Thomas Price; John Jones; Richard Fothergill; Rees Hopkin Rhys; J. L. Roberts; Griffith David; David Williams;, Phillip John; Thomas Wayne.; Crawshay Bailey.

=== 1856 Election ===
Elected: Thomas Wayne* 806; Rees Hopkin Rhys* 747; Griffith Davies 686; Evan Lewis 443. Non-Elected: David Evan Williams 343; John Jones 228; Rev William Edwards 155; Thomas Joseph 105.

=== 1858 Election ===
Elected: R.E. Partridge 704; Samuel Thomas 577; Thomas Williams 529; Rees Williams 523; William Powell 507. Non-Elected: Jenkin Griffiths 311; William Williams 268; Jenkin Rees 232; Samuel Price 202; David Bevan 145; A.Mason 126; William Griffiths 119.

=== 1863 Election ===
Elected: W.W. Wayne; J.L. Roberts; David Davis; Gwilym Williams.

=== 1866 Election ===
Elected: Thomas Price 877; David Davis 863; Griffith Davies 742; William Thomas Lewis 665; Daniel Rees 580. Non-Elected: Arthur Jones 406; Morgan Phillips 334; Mordecai Jones 233; Herbert Simmonds 100.

== Sources ==
- Jones, Dot (1998). Statistical Evidence relating to the Welsh Language 1801–1911. Cardiff: University of Wales Press. p. 44. ISBN 0708314600.
- Jones, Ieuan Gwynedd (1964). "Dr. Thomas Price and the election of 1868 in Merthyr Tydfil : a study in nonconformist politics (Part One)" (PDF). Welsh History Review. 2 (2): 147–172.
- Jones, Ieuan Gwynedd (1981). Explorations & Explanations. Essays in the Social History of Victorian Wales. Llandysul: Gomer. ISBN 0-85088-644-9.
- Jones, Ieuan Gwynedd (1987). Communities. Essays in the Social History of Victorian Wales. Llandysul: Gomer. ISBN 0-86383-223-7.
- Parry, Jon (1989). "Labour Leaders and Local Politics 1888–1902: The Example of Aberdare". Welsh History Review. 14 (3): 399–416.
- Rammell, Thomas Webster (1853). Report to the General Board of Health on a preliminary inquiry into the sewerage, drainage, and supply of water, and the sanitary condition of the inhabitants of the inhabitants of the parish of Aberdare in the county of Glamorgan. General Board of Health – via Internet Archive.
- Rees, D. Ben (1975). Chapels in the Valley. The Ffynnon Press. ISBN 0-902158-08-2.
- Wills, Wilton D. (1969). "The Rev. John Griffith and the revival of the established church in nineteenth century Glamorgan". Morgannwg. 13: 75–102.
