= Benjamin Evans (Baptist minister) =

Welsh Baptist minister and author (1844–1900)

The Reverend Benjamin Evans (1844 – 1900) was a Welsh Baptist minister and author, who served as Secretary of the Baptist Missionary Society in the late nineteenth century.

== Biography ==
Born 2 May 1844, in Dowlais in Glamorganshire, Evans worked as a coal miner from the age of eight. He joined the Baptist congregation at Moriah in Dowlais in 1856, and in 1868 was accepted as a student at Haverfordwest Baptist College. Ordained in 1871, his first ministry was in the city of St Davids, Pembrokeshire, relocating in 1876 to Aberdare where he became minister of Gadlys Chapel. Evans was one of several Baptist ministers serving a working-class and largely Welsh speaking population. His personal ministry was to the community living immediately adjacent to the Gadlys ironworks which had been established in 1827.

Evans quickly established himself in Gadlys as a popular preacher and Eisteddfodwr. He was known, without apparent irony, as the 'Bishop of Gadlys'. During his Gadlys ministry, he was selected by the Baptist Missionary Society as its agent for Wales, and was later named Secretary of the Society as a whole. In 1891, he wrote a biography of fellow minister and missionary Thomas Price. In 1896 he was appointed as inaugural clerk to the Governors of Aberdare Intermediate School, and was elected two years later to the Aberdare School Board.

Soon after his arrival in Aberdare, Evans became involved in public life and this often brought him into conflict with other leading figures such as the local miners' agent, David Morgan, with whom Evans had a feud over several years. In 1894 he became one of the first members of the Aberdare Urban District Council, and remained a member until his death. When Morgan was elevated to the aldermanic bench in 1895, Evans staked a claim to succeed him as county councillor but the Liberal nomination went to another minister, Richard Morgan. He died in 1900.
