= Llwydcoed (electoral ward) =

Former electoral ward in Rhondda Cynon Taf, Wales

The community of Llwydcoed, Rhondda Cynon Taf was, for much of the twentieth century, and electoral ward for the purposes of electing members to Glamorgan County Council and the Aberdare Urban District Council. Llwydcoed is no longer an electoral ward but forms part of Aberdare West/Llwydcoed electoral ward for the purposes of Rhondda Cynon Taf unitary authority elections

Llwydcoed first became an electoral ward in the late nineteenth century with the formation of Glamorgan County Council. Llwydcoed was also an electoral ward of the Aberdare Urban District Council from its formation in 1894.

== History 1889–1914 ==
The first representative was the venerable Rees Hopkin Rhys who was succeeded by the Liberal industrialist Rees Llewellyn

=== Glamorgan County Council ===
In 1889, Rees Hopkin Rhys was elected as member for Llwydcoed, defeating Griffith George.

Llwydcoed 1889
Party	Candidate	Votes	%	±%
Conservative	Rees Hopkin Rhys	317		
Liberal	Griffith George	258		
Majority		59		

Rhys was re-elected unopposed in 1892 and although described as a Liberal this was unlikely.

Llwydcoed
Party	Candidate	Votes	%	±%
Liberal	Rees Hopkin Rhys	unopposed		
Liberal hold		Swing		

Boundary changes in 1895 saw Rhys, now 75 years of age opposed by Richard Morgan, whose Hirwaun seat had been abolished.

Llwydcoed 1895
Party	Candidate	Votes	%	±%
Liberal	Rees Hopkin Rhys*	577		
Liberal	Rev Richard Morgan*	561		

Rhys was again elected unopposed in 1898

Llwydcoed 1898
Party	Candidate	Votes	%	±%
Unionist	Rees Hopkin Rhys	unopposed		

Rhys died in 1899 and was succeeded by Rees Llewellyn.

In 1901, Llewellyn was re-elected.

Llwydcoed 1901
Party	Candidate	Votes	%	±%
Liberal	Rees Llewellyn	759		
	T. Lewis	289		

He was again re-elected in 1904.

Llwydcoed 1904
Party	Candidate	Votes	%	±%
Liberal	Rees Llewellyn*	unopposed		

Llewellyn was again re-elected unopposed in 1907

Llwydcoed 1907
Party	Candidate	Votes	%	±%
Liberal	Rees Llewellyn*	unopposed		

Despite occasional challenges by the Labour Party at district council level (see below), labour did not challenge for the county seat in this period.

=== Aberdare Urban District Council ===
Llwydcoed was also an electoral ward of the Aberdare Urban District Council from its formation in 1894.

Llwydcoed Ward 1894
Party	Candidate	Votes	%	±%
	Rees Hopkin Rhys	684		
	Rees Llewellyn	640		
	Owen Harris	623		
	John William Evans	525		
Labour	David Morgan	198		

Llwydcoed Ward 1896
Party	Candidate	Votes	%	±%
	Owen Harries*	unopposed		

In 1899, Owen Harries was again returned unopposed.

Llwydcoed Ward 1899
Party	Candidate	Votes	%	±%
	Owen Harris*	unopposed		

In 1900, two members were elected owing to the vacant seat following the death of Rees Hopkin Rhys. John William Evans, whip had failed to be elected at the initial election in 1894 but who subsequently became a county councillor and a county alderman, was seventeen votes ahead of sitting councillor Rees Llewellyn.

Llwydcoed Ward 1900
Party	Candidate	Votes	%	±%
	John William Evans	734		
	Rees Llewellyn*	717		
	Thomas Lewis	427		

In 1901, Llewellyn was re-elected by a large majority.

Llwydcoed Ward 1901
Party	Candidate	Votes	%	±%
	Rees Llewellyn*	825		
	W. Williams	291		

In 1902, Owen Harris was once again returned unopposed.

Llwydcoed Ward 1902
Party	Candidate	Votes	%	±%
	Owen Harris*	unopposed		

In 1903, J.W. Evans was re-elected unopposed.

Llwydcoed Ward
Party	Candidate	Votes	%	±%
	John William Evans*	unopposed		

In 1904 an additional seat was created, allowing T. Walter Williams to be returned alongside Rees Llewellyn.

Llwydcoed Ward 1904
Party	Candidate	Votes	%	±%
	Rees Llewellyn*	872		
	T. Walter Williams	866		
	William Williams	238		
	Joseph Morgan	177		
	James Berry	125		

In 1905, following the death of Owen Harris, his son, Morgan J. Harris, was elected in his place after defeating a Labour candidate.

Llwydcoed Ward 1905
Party	Candidate	Votes	%	±%
	M.J. Harries	852		
Labour	John Teague	424		

In 1906, John William Evans stood down due to ill health and died shortly afterwards. He was succeeded by J.O. George who defeated a Labour candidate.

Llwydcoed Ward 1906
Party	Candidate	Votes	%	±%
	J.O. George	746		
Labour	Edward Davies	484		

1907 saw the return of the sitting members by a comfortable majority.

Llwydcoed Ward 1907
Party	Candidate	Votes	%	±%
	Rees Llewellyn*	1,034		
	T. Walter Williams*	795		
	D. Jenkins	456		

== Cynon Valley Borough Council ==
Between 1973 and 1996 Llwydcoed was a ward for Cynon Valley Borough Council. The ward elected six borough councillors, reducing to one councillor from 1986.

== 1995– ==
Llwydcoed is no longer an electoral ward but forms part of Aberdare West/Llwydcoed for the purposes of Rhondda Cynon Taf unitary authority elections. Since 1995 Aberdare West/Llwydcoed has been represented by Plaid Cymru and Labour councillors.
