= Edmund Mills Hann =

Welsh prominent figure (1850–1931)

Hann, Edmund Mills
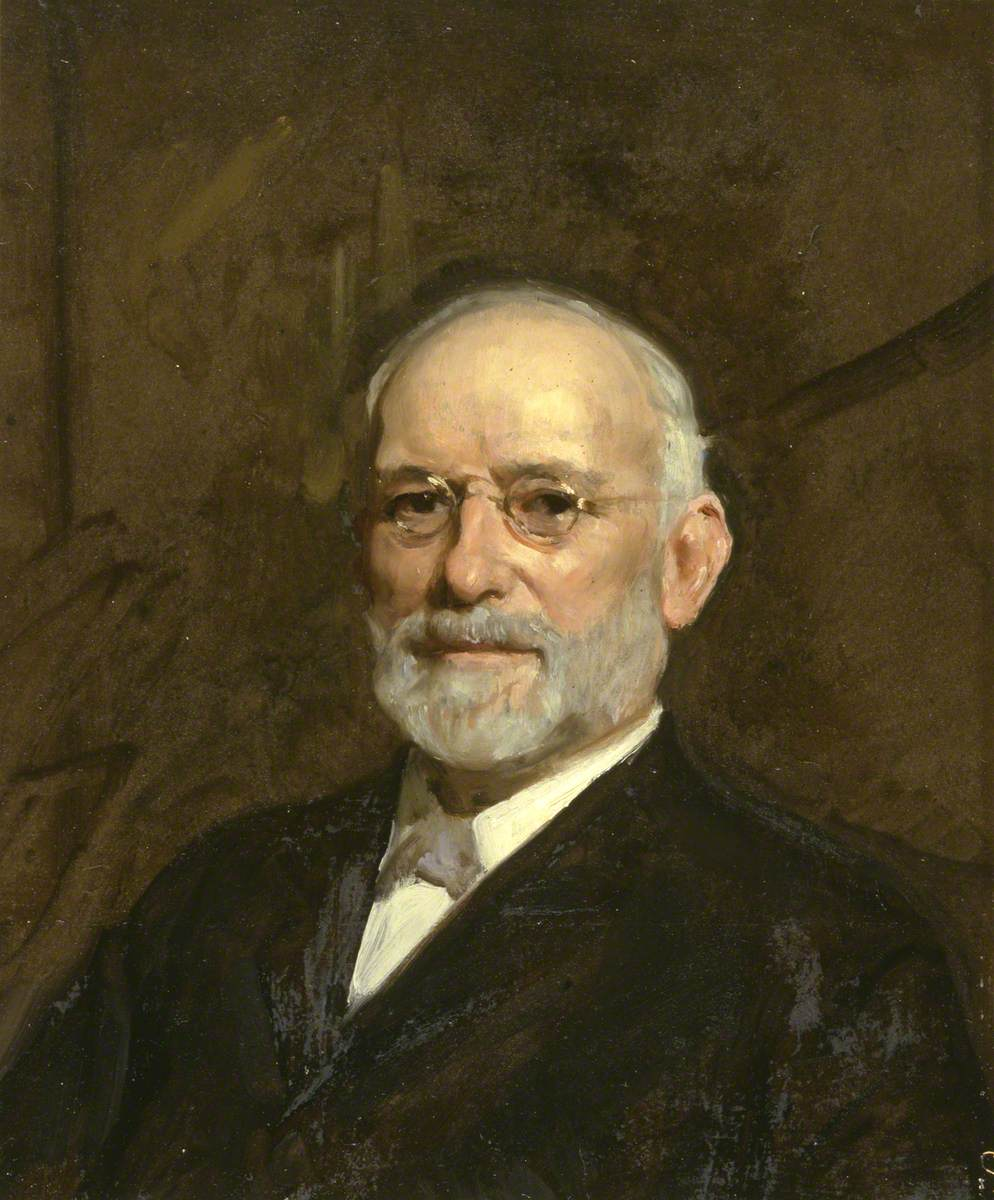
- Born: 1850; Houghton-le-Spring
- Died: 1931 (aged 80–81); Cardiff
- Citizenship: British
- Spouse: Mary Ann Brown (m. 1874)
- Parent(s): William Hann and Caroline Hutchinson Mills (d. 1852)

Edmund Mills Hann (1850–1931) was a Welsh prominent figure in the industrial life of South Wales, and a leading coal owner during the industrial struggles of the 1920s.

He was active in local politics in the Aberdare area and an inaugural member of the Aberdare Urban District Council in 1894.

== Political life ==
In 1889, Hann unsuccessfully sought election as a Conservative to the Glamorgan County Council but was defeated by a Liberal tradesman, T.P. White. The result was regarded with surprise in some quarters and when White was elevated to the aldermanic bench it was felt locally that Hann would be successful in the subsequent by-election. However, Hann was again defeated by a different Liberal candidate, Thomas Davies. Hann thereafter recognised that gaining seat on the County Council in a strongly Liberal township such as Aberaman was beyond him.

More locally, however, Hann was more successful. When the Aberdare Urban District Council was established in 1894, Hann had the highest poll in the Aberaman ward and was duly elected as one of the three ward councillors. He remained a member for over a decade. In 1896 he became High-Constable of Aberdare. He was elected the first president of Aberdare General Hospital.

== Business life ==
Hann's mining apprenticeship was served in County Durham. He was elected a member of the North of England Institute of Mining and Mechanical Engineers on 5 September 1868. He was then described as a Graduate member located at "Hetton Colliery, Fencehouses". There are Hann's buried in the nearly Hillside Cemetery of Houghton-Le-Spring. His route to South Wales was via Sir George Elliot, 1st Baronet.

Hann was deeply engaged in the mining life of South Wales as his membership entry in the South Wales Institute of Engineers shows. He was the president of this institute 1903–1905, and a Gold Medallist of the institute in 1908. He had first joined this institute in 1878. The Gold Medal paper was entitled A Recent plant for the Utilisation of Small Coal, this was only the second Gold Medal awarded by the institute. He was a member of the Institution of Civil Engineers.

He was a key director in the Powell Duffryn Steam Coal Co, the Rhymney Iron Company and the Taff Merthyr Steam Coal Company. His Powell Duffryn directorship started in 1916. Previously, by 1896, he was in the position of general manager to the Powell Duffryn Colliery Company.

In 1914, Hann became chairman of the Monmouthshire and South Wales Coalowners Association. At which time the Aberdare Leader reviewed his contribution to the South Wales mining industry thus "At the age of 29 he was appointed manager of one of the Powell Duffryn Pits at New Tredegar, being afterwards transferred to the Aberdare Valley as general manager of the company's pits there. Under his supervision the Aberdare collieries soon thrived in a remarkable manner, shortly afterwards Mr Hann was appointed general manager of the company's collieries in the Aberdare and Tredegar districts. During the 35 years he has been connected with the company Mr Hann has seen many changes in the great concern of which he is the head. now one of the most prosperous undertakings in the South Wales coalfield".

As a leading mine owner, Edmund Hann was on several occasions reported by the local newspapers in regard to trade disputes. Examples of this took place in 1910.

== Home life ==
Welsh tradition asserts that Hann's family came from County Durham. It seems his Mother Caroline came from Sunderland, County Durham, though his Father a Cashier Colliery Agent came from Wallsend, Newcastle, Northumberland.

Using his membership record in the Transactions of the North of England Institute of Mining and Mechanical Engineers, it can be seen that in 1872 his home was "Lofthouse" (for Loftus, Cleveland). In 1873–1876 his home was Brotton adjacent to Saltburn-by-the-Sea (and a place where there were only ironstone mines). Whereas by 1877 his home was Glanmoor Villa, Uplands, Swansea.

In 1912, his home was The Oaklands, Aberaman, Aberdare. By 1923–1928 his home was The Rise, Llanishen, Cardiff.

Hann was married to Mary Ann from Crook, County Durham and had a daughter Florence, who along with their first son William Reginald M., were born while they lived in Brotton. There were certainly five sons. Several of them followed their father into the South Wales Mining Industry. A small portrait of the family (and another confirmation of the Oaklands location) comes in the wedding note for the fifth son Frank Percival Hann who was married in 1913. Frank Percival Hann along with his younger brother Douglas Alfred were both born in Aberdare, and from the 1901 Census it is known they had some of their education at Haileybury College, near Hertford, Hertfordshire. They both returned to, Aberman, Aberdare to become Mining Engineers. In the membership lists of The South Wales Institute of Engineers Proceedings Frank Percival is noted as a colliery manager elected to membership in 1905. The Edmund L. Hann elected in 1902 and resident in Aberdare in the same list is another sibling, this E.L. Hann is likely to be the third son Edmund Lawrence Hann, who is mentioned along with two other of Edmund Mills Hann's sons in his Will.

Using this source, the first son to follow father into the coal industry was George G. Hann also of Aberdare in 1914 and first elected to this institute in 1898. George Hann predeceased his father, dying in 1918.

These sons can also be found in lists of company directors associated with their father. In 1928 the Rhymney Iron Co. had E. L. Hann and E. M. Hann were directors and the general manager was D. A. Hann.
