= Rees Llewellyn =

Rees Llewellyn (20 June 1851 – 21 August 1919) was an industrialist and public figure in Aberdare, South Wales and a prominent figure in the industrial history of the South Wales Coalfield.

He was the son of David Llewellyn, Parc Isaf, Treorchy, and was born at Cwmpark House, within 50 yards, near to the Ocean Colliery at that place. He was educated at the National School, Pentre, and afterwards at the Grammar School, Bridgend. In 1866, he was articled as surveyor to Leyshon Rees of Hirwaun and three years later he became a surveyor at the Ocean Colliery, Cwmpark. By 1877 he was manager of the Bwllfa and Merthyr Dare Collieries. In 1891 the Bwllfa Company was formed, with Llewellyn as Director and Resident Colliery Agent. In 1897 he was President of the Colliery Managers Association and in 1899, a member of the South Wales and Monmouthshire Coal Owners Association.

== Public life ==
Llewellyn played a prominent role in the public life of the Aberdare Valley. he became a member of the Aberdare School Board in 1879 and of the Aberdare Local Board of Health in 1882. In 1894 he became a founder member of the Aberdare Urban District Council. In 1899 he became High Constable of Miskin Higher and succeeded Rees Hopkin Rhys as the member of Glamorgan County Council for Llwydcoed. He was made High Sheriff of Breconshire in 1916.

== Later years ==
Llewellyn died at Bwllfa House, Aberdare, on 21 August 1919.
