= Rees Hopkin Rhys =

Welsh industrialist (1819–1899)

Rees Hopkin Rhys (19 March 1819 – 1899) was an industrialist, landowner and prominent local government figure in the Aberdare area for much of the nineteenth century.

Rhys was born in Llwydcoed and from an early age showed an interest in public affairs. In 1847, he lost his sight after an accident at Dowlais works where he was conducting experiments with "gun cotton".

== Public life ==
Following his accident, Rhys devoted much of his time and energy to public life and became a highly respected figure in the Aberdare Valley, even among those of opposing political views. He was involved with a number of public improvements in Aberdare, including the development of Aberdare Park, for which he donated the land.

In 1846 he became one of the three members representing Aberdare on the Merthyr Tydfil Board of Guardians in the 1840s and was chairman from 1880 to 1887. For many years he chaired the Assessment Committee, and was also involved in the industrial schools movement. In 1884 the Guardians unveiled a marble bust of Rhys, prepared by Thomas Brock, which was placed in the committee room.

Rhys was best known in local government as a member of the Aberdare Local Board of Health from its formation in 1854, serving as its chairman from the 1860s until its abolition. As a member of the Local Board, Rhys was instrumental in securing land from the Charity Commissioners where the Aberdare Public Park was developed, and also land for the municipal cemetery. He was also prominent in the development of the water and sewerage schemes for Aberdare. He also served as a member and chairman of the Aberdare Burial Board.

Similarly, he was a member of the Aberdare School Board from 1874 and served as its chairman from 1877 until 1898. As an educationalist his activities ranged from advocating industrial schools to take children out of the workhouse to his membership of the Governors of the University College Cardiff.

Rhys was made a county magistrate for Glamorgan in 1867 and at the time of his death he was the longest serving member of the bench. In 1889 he became an inaugural member of Glamorgan County Council, after a close contest with Griffith George, a prominent Liberal in Aberdare. During that contest, Rhys received the public support of Lord Aberdare. This, in turn, led to an attack on Rhys's record as a magistrate and guardian of the poor in the columns of the radical journal, Baner ac Amserau Cymru. He remained a member of the county council until his death.

In 1894 he became an inaugural member and first chairman of the Aberdare Urban District Council. In 1898, in recognition of his long public service, and to mark the onset of his eightieth year, Rhys was presented with a testimonial and a gift of a thousand guineas.

At the time of his death Rhys was described as a moderate liberal who took little interest in national politics and concentrated on his work on local public bodies. In reality, however, he inclined towards the Conservative Party and supported William Thomas Lewis as Conservative candidate for Merthyr Boroughs at the 1880 General Election, having led the deputation to request him to contest the seat against Henry Richard and C.H. James.

Rhys was a Unitarian by upbringing, which reflected his family connections with Hen-Dy-Cwrdd, at Llwydcoed. He did, however, grow distant from these connections in his later years.

Rhys died in 1899, aged 81. He was buried in the family grave at Penderyn.
