= Ogmore, Vale of Glamorgan =

Village in the Vale of Glamorgan, Wales

Coordinates: 51.47907°N 3.61131°W

Ogmore (Welsh: Ogwr) is a village in St Bride's Major community in the Vale of Glamorgan, Wales on the River Ogmore. It grew around the now ruined Ogmore Castle, built by the Normans.

The village lies within the Vale of Glamorgan parliamentary constituency, not the Rhondda and Ogmore constituency, which lies further north up the Ogmore River. Southerndown Golf Club lies opposite the village.
