= Aberdare Urban District =

Former district in Cynon Valley, Wales

Aberdare Urban District Council was a local authority in Aberdare, Wales.

== History ==
It was created in 1894 as a result of the 1894 Local Government of England and Wales Act and the 1894 Aberdare Urban District Council election saw the election of the first members of the authority. The Council existed until 1973 and replaced the Aberdare Local Board of Health which had functioned since the 1840s. Its boundaries were identical to those of the original parish of Aberdare. Initially, the Council had fifteen members but this was increased to twenty in 1906, as a result of the increase in population. There were five wards, namely Aberaman (also known as No. 5 Ward), Blaengwawr (also known as No. 4 Ward), Gadlys (also known as No. 2 Ward), Llwydcoed (also known as No. 1 Ward), and the Town Ward (also known as No. 3 Ward).

The first councillors were elected at the 1894 elections.

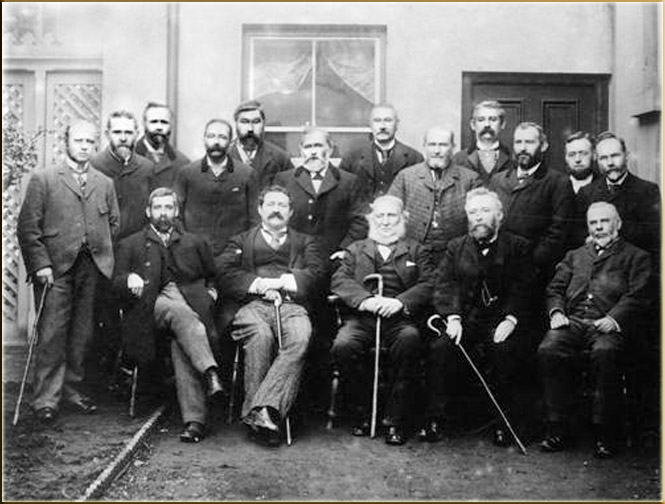
Members of the first Aberdare Urban District Council, 1894

Most of the first members of the authority had served on the Local Board, including the first chairman, Rees Hopkin Rhys who had chaired the Local Board since the 1860s. Other inaugural members included Rees Llewellyn, owner of the Bwllfa Colliery and Edmund Mills Hann who later became a director of Powell Duffryn Collieries. All three of these men were leading figures in the industrial life of the valley and beyond. From the outset there was a strong representation on the Council of middle-class nonconformist liberals, who were typical of the new elite who rose to prominence in Wales in the late-Victorian and Edwardian periods. Chief among these were Benjamin Evans, minister of Gadlys Chapel, Thomas Humphreys, minister of Seion, Cwmaman, and Griffith George, a prominent businessman in the town. All three were leading Baptists.

Following the inaugural elections there were comparatively few contests during the next few years. The elections of 1896 and 1897 were low key and several seats were uncontested.

In the years leading up to the First World War, representatives of the Labour Party began to gain ground. At the initial election, miners' agent David Morgan had been heavily defeated and the workers' candidates made little headway until the turn of the century, and the Town and Gadlys wards remained barren territory for Labour candidates for many years. By 1914, however, they held several seats, and dominated the Aberaman and Blaengwawr wards. The elected representatives included Charles Butt Stanton.

In 1974 the authority was abolished, and together with the former urban district of Mountain Ash and some outlying areas, formed the Cynon Valley Borough Council which, in turn, was subsumed into the unitary authority of Rhondda Cynon Taf in 1996.

== Notable members of the Council ==
- Rev Benjamin Evans, Baptist minister
- Edmund Mills Hann, industrialist
- Rees Llewellyn, coalowner
- Rees Hopkin Rhys, industrialist
- Charles Stanton, miners' agent

== Bibliography ==
- Parry, Jon (1989). "Labour Leaders and Local Politics 1888-1902: The Example of Aberdare". Welsh History Review. 14 (3): 399–416.

== See also ==
- 1894 Aberdare Urban District Council election
- 1896 Aberdare Urban District Council election
- 1899 Aberdare Urban District Council election
- 1900 Aberdare Urban District Council election
- 1901 Aberdare Urban District Council election
- 1902 Aberdare Urban District Council election
- 1903 Aberdare Urban District Council election
- 1904 Aberdare Urban District Council election
- 1905 Aberdare Urban District Council election
- 1906 Aberdare Urban District Council election
- 1907 Aberdare Urban District Council election
- 1908 Aberdare Urban District Council election
- 1909 Aberdare Urban District Council election
- 1910 Aberdare Urban District Council election
