= John William Evans (Welsh politician) =

Welsh politician and public figure

John William Evans (1870-1906) was a Liberal politician and public figure in Aberdare, South Wales.

Evans was born in Hirwaun in 1870. His father Evan J. Evans, was a prosperous business man in Hirwaun, and a deacon at Tabernacle Congregational Chapel, and one of the founders of the church. He was educated locally and at St. Andrew's College, Swansea, and the Independent College, Taunton. He entered the legal profession, and was articled to Mr. Coe, of Cardiff, before setting up a successful practice at Aberdare. He was married with one son.

== Public life ==
When only 21 years of age, Evans was selected a member of the Merthyr Board of Guardians. It was said that he was at the time the youngest guardian in the United Kingdom.

In late 1894 he unsuccessfully sought election to the Aberdare Urban District Council but shortly afterwards, in 1895 he was elected to Glamorgan County Council to represent the Aberdare Town Ward, and in 1898 was made an alderman. In 1900 he was elected to the Aberdare Urban District Council, a position which he held without opposition until his retirement two months before his death

It was said that 'his presence at the meetings of municipal bodies would invariably banish dulness and monotony, for he was extremely humorous. His ready wit and repartee was as refreshing as a summer shower on a parched desert, being of a social disposition, he was most pleasant and genial in conversation, and beloved by everybody.'

== Death ==
Evnas died in 1906 at the early age of 36. He was buried at Penderyn Churchyard.
