= Griffith George =

Griffith George (1847–1910) was a Liberal politician, businessman and a prominent figure in the cultural and religious life of Aberdare and Glamorgan, Wales.

George was born in Llangoedmor, near Cardigan, but moved at a young age to Pontseli, near Newcastle Emlyn. One of his contemporaries was Herber Evans, a prominent Calvinistic Methodist minister. He entered the drapery trade and spent a number of years in London. He married Rachel Rees, of Castell Gorwyn, Trelech, Carmarthenshire and they had a son and two daughters. The son became a mining engineer in India.

In 1876, George moved to Trecynon where he opened a drapery business, and in 1886 he took over the larger concern of Henry Lewis, known as the Beehive, in Victoria Square, Aberdare. He retired from business in 1900.

George became active in local Liberal politics, was a founder member of the Aberdare Liberal Club and was also active in the South Wales Liberal Association.

In 1894 George was elected as one of the first members of the Aberdare Urban District Council and he became an advocate of free libraries. Controversy over this issue, however, led to his defeat in 1899.

In 1901 George was invited, following a public meeting, to contest the Gadlys ward in the Glamorgan County Council elections. He refused, but stood three years later, attracting some criticism for opposing the Labour candidate, Evan Parker. He became a member of the County Education Committee and a governor of the Aberdare County School.

George was a deacon and leading member of Heolyfelin Chapel, Aberdare. His home in later life was at The Laurels, Trecynon.

George had many literary interests and was known by the pseudonym Gruffydd Dyfed, and a volume of his literary works was published in 1906.

George died in Tenerife where he was spending the winter for health reasons, and was buried on the island.
