= Aberdare Town (electoral ward) =

Former electoral ward of Aberdare Urban District, Wales

Aberdare Town was, for much of the twentieth century, an electoral ward for the purposes of electing members to Glamorgan County Council and the Aberdare Urban District Council. It currently comprises two electoral wards, Aberdare East and Aberdare West/Llwydcoed, for the purposes of electing members to the Rhondda Cynon Taf County Borough Council. Aberdare East is composed mainly of a part of Aberdare itself while Aberdare West includes the community of Llwydcoed which, for many years was itself as electoral ward.

Aberdare Town first became an electoral ward in the late nineteenth century with the formation of Glamorgan County Council. Aberdare Town was also one of the five electoral wards of the Aberdare Urban District Council from its formation in 1894. The other wards were Aberaman, Blaengwawr, Gadlys and Llwydcoed.

== History 1889-1914 ==
=== Glamorgan County Council 1889-1914 ===
In 1889, David Price Davies became the first Liberal member for Aberdare Town.

Aberdare Town 1889
Party	Candidate	Votes	%	±%
Liberal	David Price Davies	unopposed		
Majority				

Davies was returned unopposed again in 1892.

Aberdare Town 1892
Party	Candidate	Votes	%	±%
Liberal	David Price Davies*	unopposed		
Liberal hold		Swing		

Following David Price Davies's elevation to the aldermanic bench in 1892, the by-election was said to have created an intense amount of enthusiasm and more excitement than has been known to an election in this parish for many years.

Aberdare Town by-election 1892
Party	Candidate	Votes	%	±%
Liberal	Thomas Thomas	702		
Liberal	Griffith George	512		
Liberal hold		Swing		

In 1895, Thomas Thomas was defeated by John William Evans.

Aberdare Town 1895
Party	Candidate	Votes	%	±%
Liberal	John William Evans*	586		
Liberal	Thomas Thomas*	376		
Majority		210		
Liberal hold		Swing		

In 1898, David Price Davies's term as alderman came to an end but Evans declined to stand down in his favour, as was the convention when there were two sitting members of a similar political persuasion. Davies consequently withdrew, resulting in the loss of his aldermanic seat.

Aberdare Town 1898
Party	Candidate	Votes	%	±%
Liberal	John William Evans*	unopposed		
Liberal hold		Swing		

Evans was made an alderman after the election, possible to facilitate Davies's re-election. At the resulting by-election, Thomas Thomas, the former member, was initially nominated but withdrew allowing Davies to be returned unopposed. However, Davies had now lost his primacy as the senior representative.

Aberdare Town by-election 1898
Party	Candidate	Votes	%	±%
Liberal	David Price Davies*	unopposed		
Liberal hold		Swing		

In 1901, Davies was defeated by David Hughes.

Aberdare Town 1901
Party	Candidate	Votes	%	±%
Liberal	David Hughes	709		
Liberal	David Price Davies*	488		
Liberal hold		Swing		

Hughes stood aside in 1904 at the end of J.W. Evans's aldermanic term.

Aberdare Town 1904
Party	Candidate	Votes	%	±%
Liberal	John William Evans**	unopposed		
Liberal hold		Swing		

Hughes was returned at the by-election.

Hughes narrowly held the seat in 1907, having been opposed by Edward Morgan, a leading member of the district council.

Aberdare Town 1907
Party	Candidate	Votes	%	±%
Liberal	David Hughes*	677		
Liberal	Edward Morgan	632		
Majority		45		
Liberal hold		Swing		

== Aberdare Urban District Council ==
Aberdare (Town) was also an electoral ward of the Aberdare Urban District Council from its formation in 1894.

Town Ward 1894
Party	Candidate	Votes	%	±%
	Edward Morgan	837		
	David Williams	639		
	Thomas Thomas	618		
	David Davies	493		
	Joseph Price	474		

Thomas Thomas, the sitting member and a former county councillor was said to have been removed as candidate by the Liberal and Labour Association in favour of Lewis Noah Williams, a prominent local businessman and son of William Williams (Carw Coch). John William Evans, who had ousted Thomas from the seat at the 1895 election was also nominated but also withdrew before the poll.

Town Ward
Party	Candidate	Votes	%	±%
	Lewis Noah Williams	unopposed		

In 1974 the authority was abolished, and together with the former urban district of Mountain Ash and some outlying areas, formed the Cynon Valley Borough Council which, in turn, was subsumed into the unitary authority of Rhondda Cynon Taf in 1996.

== 21st century ==
Aberdare is currently made up of two wards, Aberdare East and Aberdare West/Llwydcoed, for the purposes of Rhondda Cynon Taf unitary authority elections. Since 1995 it has been represented by Labour councillors.
