= Glamorgan County Council =

Welsh local governing body (1889–1974)

Glamorgan County Council was established in 1889 together with the administrative county of Glamorganshire under the Local Government Act 1888. The first elections to the council were held in January 1889. The council was abolished under the Local Government Act 1972 on 1 April 1974. It was replaced by Mid Glamorgan County Council, South Glamorgan County Council and West Glamorgan County Council.

== The first Council, 1889-92 ==
There were sixty-eight members elected to the new county council in 1889. Prior to 1889 local government had been carried out by unelected magistrates, often wealthy industrialists and landowners. The first intake of Glamorgan County Council reflected this. Eight members declaring themselves as 'colliery proprietors' (and 15 others being chairmen, directors or prominent colliery shareholders). Owner of Cyfarthfa Ironworks, William T. Crawshay, was elected in the Cyfarthfa ward and four tinplate manufacturers were elected. Sir Hussey Vivian (shortly to become Lord Swansea) was elected in Tyrdennau and his brother Arthur was elected in Margam. The Earl of Dunraven was elected in Bridgend.

The first meeting of the Council was held at the Gwyn Hall in Neath and Sir Hussey Vivian MP elected to the chair. The Liberal group did agree on a list of aldermen beforehand, but they were not as cohesive as in other counties in using a block vote.

One of the main debates related to the venue for meetings, with the claims of Neath and Pontypridd being most prominent. The Bridgend Local Board of Health had petitioned Lord Dunraven to lobby for that town to be considered. The matter was resolved for the time being at the first statutory meeting, held at Pontypridd on 1 April where it was decided that the meetings be held alternately at Pontypridd and Neath, with the claims of Cardiff being rejected.

At this meeting also, the chairman of the Council, Sir Hussey Vivian, paid tribute to the magistrates for their past conduct of county business. Although not a representative body, he stated, they had conducted their work honourably and he hoped that the Council 'would be able in future to conduct the business of the county in as complete and perfect a manner as it had been conducted hitherto by the magistrates.'

== The 1890s ==
In contrast to the first Council which included no working men, a number were elected to the second council.

Lord Swansea died in 1894. The Liberal group were divided on a successor as chairman of the Council and J. Blandy Jenkins defeated Arthur Pendarves Vivian by 31 votes to 30 in March 1895. He was repeatedly re-elected for the next fifteen years.

== County Hall, Cardiff ==
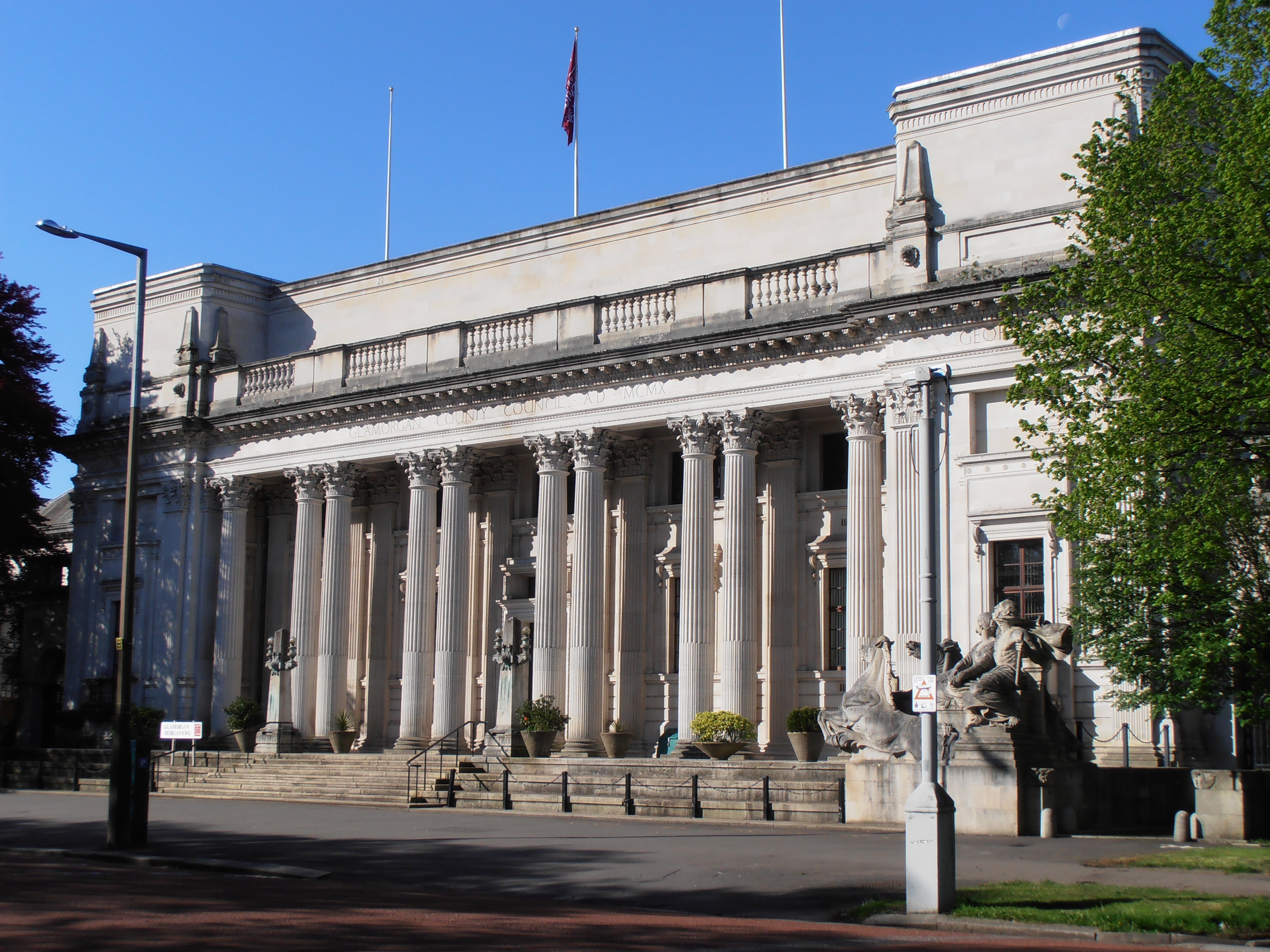
County Hall, Cardiff

The county council considered a number of locations for a single county headquarters, including Bridgend, Llandaff, Merthyr Tydfil, Neath and Pontypridd. Cardiff offered a site in the centre of the city and the county council launched a competition in July 1908 inviting designs for a new building. County Hall was built on Edward VII Avenue, Cathays Park, completed in 1911 and opened in 1912.

== Elections ==
- 1889 Glamorgan County Council election
- 1892 Glamorgan County Council election
- 1895 Glamorgan County Council election
- 1898 Glamorgan County Council election
- 1901 Glamorgan County Council election
- 1904 Glamorgan County Council election
- 1907 Glamorgan County Council election
- 1910 Glamorgan County Council election
- 1913 Glamorgan County Council election
- 1919 Glamorgan County Council election
- 1967 Glamorgan County Council election

== See also ==
- Glamorgan County Hall
- Mid Glamorgan County Council
- South Glamorgan County Council
