= Gadlys (electoral ward) =

Former electoral ward in Glamorgan, Wales

Gadlys was, for much of the twentieth century, an electoral ward for the purposes of electing members to Glamorgan County Council and the Aberdare Urban District Council. Gadlys no longer forms an electoral ward and is part of Aberdare.

Gadlys first became an electoral ward in the late nineteenth century with the formation of Glamorgan County Council. Gadlys was also one of the five electoral wards of the Aberdare Urban District Council from its formation in 1894. The other wards were Aberaman, Aberdare Town, Blaengwawr, and Llwydcoed.

== History ==
Gadlys first became an electoral ward in the late nineteenth century with the formation of Glamorgan County Council. In 1889, James Lewis was elected as Independent member for Gadlys, defeating the nominee of the local Liberal Association. Lewis stood down in 1892 and was succeeded by David Morgan who was re-elected in 1895.

Gadlys was also an electoral ward of the Aberdare Urban District Council from its formation in 1894.

== 21st century ==
Gadlys no longer forms an electoral ward and is part of Aberdare.
