= The Welsh History Review =

- Discipline: History of Wales
- Language: English, Welsh
- Edited by: Huw Pryce, Paul O'Leary

Publication details
- History: 1960–present
- Publisher: University of Wales Press (Wales)
- Frequency: Biannually

Standard abbreviations
- ISO 4: Welsh Hist. Rev.

Indexing
- ISSN: 0043-2431
- LCCN: 61045453
- OCLC no.: 1769587

Links
- Journal homepage; Online archive

The Welsh History Review (Welsh: Cylchgrawn Hanes Cymru) is a peer-reviewed academic journal covering the history of Wales. It is published in four parts per volume, one volume every two years. The journal was established in 1960. The editors-in-chief are Huw Pryce (Bangor University) and Paul O'Leary (Aberystwyth University).
