= 1895 Glamorgan County Council election =

Welsh local election

The third election to Glamorgan County Council was held on 4 March 1895. It was preceded by the 1892 election and followed by the 1898 election.

Glamorgan County Council had been established by the Local Government Act 1888, and the first elections held in early 1889. The county of Glamorgan was at this time becoming heavily industrialised, although some areas such as the Vale of Glamorgan remained essentially rural. The rise of nonconformist liberalism, especially since the 1860s, throughout Wales, had challenged the prevailing influence of the landed gentry. However, even in 1889, the traditional forces remained influential and no working men were elected to the Council. This changed in 1892 with the unopposed return of David Morgan in Aberdare and the success of Isaac Evans in Resolven.

== Overview of the result ==
As in most parts of Wales, the Liberal Party was once again triumphant and won a majority of the seats. In 1895 there were more unopposed results than in previous elections and the Conservatives made some headway, reflecting the position in the United Kingdom as a whole where the party took power that year.

Results are drawn from the Cardiff Times. Results also appeared in the Celt (Bala). Some additional results are drawn from local newspapers in South Wales.

== Boundary changes ==
There were some boundary changes at this election. In the Aberdare area the wards were reorganised to reflect those operating for the new Aberdare Urban District Council.

An additional ward was created at Cadoxton following the division of the existing Barry division.

== Unopposed returns ==
As in previous elections there were a fair number of unopposed returns, including some seats not contested by the Liberals.

== Retiring aldermen ==
Of the eleven retiring aldermen, two were Conservatives. Following the episode in 1892 when all but two aldermen did not seek re-election, only for the Council to decide that this was a pre-requisite for election as aldermen, a larger number sought re-election. Each was re-elected, including Sir John Llewelyn at Loughor and Penderry, although he faced Liberal opposition unlike in 1889.

Those who did not seek re-election included F.L. Davis at Ferndale.

== Contested elections ==
There were more uncontested elections than in the previous two contests for the County Council and the vast majority of those contested were straight fights between Liberal and Conservative candidates (or in some cases Independents who were widely regarded as Conservatives). In a small number of cases, Liberals faced each other.

== Ward results ==
=== Aberaman ===
The sitting member, first elected at the 1889 election and re-elected in 1895 was opposed by Thomas Rees, landlord of the Swan Hotel, Aberaman and elected a member of the Aberdare Urban District Council at the inaugural 1894 election. The Merthyr Times opined that there was no necessity for a contest, and that the unsuccessful candidate had wasted his time and money.

Aberaman 1895
Party	Candidate	Votes	%	±%
Liberal	Thomas Davies*	481		
Independent	Thomas Rees	375		
Majority		106		
Liberal hold		Swing		

=== Aberavon ===
John Morgan Smith had previously stood as an Independent, though this was commonly regarded as meaning Conservative.

Aberavon 1895
Party	Candidate	Votes	%	±%
Conservative	John Morgan Smith*	unopposed		

=== Aberdare Town ===
Aberdare Town 1895
Party	Candidate	Votes	%	±%
Liberal	John William Evans*	586		
Liberal	Thomas Thomas*	376		
Majority		210		
Liberal hold		Swing		

=== Barry ===
The former seat of Barry and Cadoxton was divided.

Barry 1895
Party	Candidate	Votes	%	±%
Liberal	John Cory*	unopposed		
Liberal hold		Swing		

=== Blaengwawr ===
The new Blaengwawr ward was created following boundary changes connected to the formation of the Aberdare Urban District Council.

Blaengwawr 1895
Party	Candidate	Votes	%	±%
Liberal	John Howell	unopposed		

=== Bridgend ===
The election was fought on party lines and covered in detail in the Glamorgan Gazette. The election was said to have attracted 'an exceptionally keen and widespread interest, not only immediately within the town boundaries, but in many an adjacent town, hamlet and village besides'. Against the tide in the county the Liberals captured Bridgend for the first time

Bridgend 1895
Party	Candidate	Votes	%	±%
Liberal	William Powell	447		
Conservative	W.M. O'Gaull	399		
Majority		48		
Liberal hold		Swing		

=== Briton Ferry ===
Briton Ferry 1895
Party	Candidate	Votes	%	±%
Conservative	Dr E.V. Pegge	425		
Liberal	Jenkin Hill*	404		
Majority		21		
Conservative gain from Liberal		Swing		

=== Cadoxton ===
Boundary Changes. A new seat of Cadoxton was created.

Cadoxton 1895
Party	Candidate	Votes	%	±%
Conservative	Dr Edward Treharne	367		
Liberal	Rev William Williams	318		
Majority		49		
Conservative win (new seat)				

=== Caeharris ===
Caeharris 1895
Party	Candidate	Votes	%	±%
Unionist	Edward Pritchard Martin	Unopposed	N/A	N/A

=== Caerphilly ===
As a result of boundary changes, two sitting members opposed each other. Hill-Male admitted that he had once been a Conservative but claimed to have been converted to the Liberal cause during his twenty years in Wales.

Caerphilly 1895
Party	Candidate	Votes	%	±%
Conservative	Henry Edzell Morgan Lindsay*	864		
Liberal	Richard Hill Male*	489		
Majority		365		
Conservative gain from Liberal		Swing		

=== Cilfynydd ===
Cilfynydd 1895
Party	Candidate	Votes	%	±%
Liberal	Henry Lewis	unopposed		
Liberal win (new seat)				

=== Coedffranc ===
Coedffranc 1895
Party	Candidate	Votes	%	±%
Conservative	J. Newell Moore*	Unopposed	N/A	N/A
Conservative hold				

=== Coity ===
Coity 1895
Party	Candidate	Votes	%	±%
Liberal	William Howell*	unopposed		
Liberal hold		Swing		

=== Cowbridge ===
Cowbridge 1895
Party	Candidate	Votes	%	±%
Conservative	Ralph Thurstan Bassett	Unopposed	N/A	N/A
Conservative hold				

=== Cwmavon ===
It was reported that Thomas Davies, the sitting member, was expected to be returned unopposed, but he was opposed by Llewellyn Griffiths, overseer, and a fellow deacon at Penuel Baptist Church, Cwmavon. Davies eventually withdrew.

Cwmavon
Party	Candidate	Votes	%	±%
Liberal	Llewellyn Griffiths	unopposed		
Liberal hold		Swing		

=== Cyfarthfa ===
The result was largely attributed to the fact that Thomas was a member of several public bodies and this was a difficult argument to counter.

Cyfarthfa 1895
Party	Candidate	Votes	%	±%
Liberal	Watkin Moss	547		
Lib-Lab	Thomas Thomas*	540		
Majority		7		
Lib-Lab hold		Swing		

=== Cymmer ===
Cymmer 1895
Party	Candidate	Votes	%	±%
Liberal	Dr Naunton Davies**	unopposed		
Liberal hold		Swing		

=== Dinas Powys ===
Dinas Powys 1895
Party	Candidate	Votes	%	±%
Conservative	Oliver Henry Jones*	unopposed		
Conservative hold		Swing		

=== Dowlais ===
Dowlais 1895
Party	Candidate	Votes	%	±%
Conservative	Thomas Jenkins*	unopposed		
Conservative hold		Swing		

=== Dulais Valley ===
Dulais Valley 1895
Party	Candidate	Votes	%	±%
Conservative	Evan Evans Bevan*	unopposed		
Conservative hold		Swing		

=== Ferndale ===
Morgan Thomas, the sitting member, was defeated by another Liberal candidate.

Ferndale 1895
Party	Candidate	Votes	%	±%
Liberal	D. Thomas	643		
Liberal	Morgan Thomas*	597		
Majority		46		
Liberal hold		Swing		

=== Gadlys ===
Morgan was re-elected although heavily defeated in the Aberdare Urban District Council election a short time before.

Gadlys 1895
Party	Candidate	Votes	%	±%
Lib-Lab	David Morgan*	770		
Liberal	William Thomas	355		
Majority		415		
Lib-Lab hold		Swing		

=== Garw Valley ===
Garw Valley 1895
Party	Candidate	Votes	%	±%
Liberal	John Thomas*	unopposed		

=== Gellifaelog 1895 ===
Gellifaelog 1895
Party	Candidate	Votes	%	±%
Liberal	Evan Lewis*	unopposed		

=== Gelligaer ===
Gelligaer 1895
Party	Candidate	Votes	%	±%
Independent	Henry William Martin	unopposed		

=== Gower ===
Gower 1895
Party	Candidate	Votes	%	±%
Liberal	Frank Cory Yeo*	unopposed		

=== Kibbor ===
Kibbor 1895
Party	Candidate	Votes	%	±%
Conservative	Henry Lewis*	unopposed		

=== Llandaff ===
Llandaff 1895
Party	Candidate	Votes	%	±%
Conservative	Robert Forrest*	unopposed		

=== Llandeilo Talybont ===
Llandeilo Talybont
Party	Candidate	Votes	%	±%
Liberal	Rees Harries*	unopposed		

=== Llansamlet ===
Llansamlet
Party	Candidate	Votes	%	±%
Liberal	William Sims	unoppposed		

=== Llantrisant ===
Llantrisant
Party	Candidate	Votes	%	±%
Liberal	J. Blandy Jenkins*	unopposed		

=== Llwydcoed ===
As a result of boundary changes, the Hirwaun Ward had been abolished and the sitting member, Richard Morgan, challenged the incumbent, Rees Hopkin Rhys in the Llwydcoed Ward.

Llwydcoed 1895
Party	Candidate	Votes	%	±%
Liberal	Rees Hopkin Rhys*	577		
Liberal	Rev Richard Morgan*	561		

=== Llwynypia and Clydach ===
Llwynypia and Clydach 1895
Party	Candidate	Votes	%	±%
Liberal	Richard Lewis	unopposed		

=== Lougher and Penderry ===
Lougher and Penderry 1895
Party	Candidate	Votes	%	±%
Conservative	Sir John Llewellyn**	636		
Liberal	S. Thomas	433		

=== Maesteg ===
James Barrow, the sitting member, was opposed by another Liberal candidate, Jenkin Jones, due to his voting against disestablishment at a council meeting. It was a lively election, with all workmen having a holiday, leaving the streets crowded throughout the day. On the following day, some of Barrow's supporters paraded through the locality on horseback but were attacked by women who threw buckets of water and ashes over them.

Maesteg 1895
Party	Candidate	Votes	%	±%
Liberal	James Barrow*	938		
Liberal	Jenkin Jones	883		

=== Margam ===
Margam
Party	Candidate	Votes	%	±%
Independent	Arthur Pendarves Vivian*	unopposed		

=== Merthyr Town ===
This result was attributed by the Merthyr Times to Liberal Party apathy and to publicans' support for the Conservative candidate.

Merthyr Town 1895
Party	Candidate	Votes	%	±%
Conservative	J.W. Lewis	706		
Liberal	Alfred Edwards	597		

=== Merthyr Vale ===
There was initially some uncertainty whether Walter Bell, who had been narrowly defeated in 1892, would oppose the sitting member.

Merthyr Vale 1895
Party	Candidate	Votes	%	±%
Conservative	Walter Bell	721		
Liberal	David Prosser*	587		
Majority		134		

=== Morriston ===
Morriston
Party	Candidate	Votes	%	±%
Liberal	William Williams	unopposed		
Liberal hold		Swing		

=== Mountain Ash ===
Mountain Ash 1895
Party	Candidate	Votes	%	±%
Liberal	Thomas Morris	549		
Liberal	Samuel Evans	459		
Liberal	John Lewis	316		
Majority		90		
Liberal hold		Swing		

=== Neath (North) ===
Neath (North) 1895
Party	Candidate	Votes	%	±%
Liberal Unionist	John Henry Rowland*	unopposed		
Liberal Unionist hold		Swing		

=== Neath (South) ===
Neath (South) 1895
Party	Candidate	Votes	%	±%
Conservative	W.B. Trick	unopposed		
Conservative gain from Liberal		Swing		

=== Newcastle ===
Newcastle 1895
Party	Candidate	Votes	%	±%
Liberal	Thomas J. Hughes	unopposed		
Liberal hold		Swing		

=== Ogmore ===
In this largely rural ward, J.D. Nicholl of Merthyr Mawr captured the seat, reversing the result of three years previously.

Ogmore 1895
Party	Candidate	Votes	%	±%
Conservative	J.D. Nicholl	458		
Liberal	Evan Evans*	372		
Majority		86		
Conservative gain from Liberal		Swing		

=== Ogmore Valley ===
Ogmore Valley 1895
Party	Candidate	Votes	%	±%
Liberal	William Llewellyn*	unopposed		
Liberal hold		Swing		

=== Oystermouth ===
Oystermouth 1895
Party	Candidate	Votes	%	±%
Liberal Unionist	Sir John Jones Jenkins	unopposed		
Liberal Unionist hold		Swing		

=== Penarth North ===
Penarth North 1895
Party	Candidate	Votes	%	±%
Liberal	W.B. Shepherd*	unopposed		
Liberal hold		Swing		

=== Penarth South ===
Penarth South 1895
Party	Candidate	Votes	%	±%
	Frederick Henry Jotham	unopposed		

=== Penrhiwceiber ===
Penrhiwceiber
Party	Candidate	Votes	%	±%
Liberal	Dr. R. W. Jones	unopposed		
Liberal hold		Swing		

=== Pentre ===
Pentre 1895
Party	Candidate	Votes	%	±%
Liberal	Richard Morris*	473		
Lib-Lab	Howell Price	348		
Majority				
Liberal hold		Swing		

=== Penydarren ===
Penydarren 1895
Party	Candidate	Votes	%	±%
Liberal	David Davies*	516		
Conservative	Thomas Edward Morgan	370		
Majority		146		

=== Pontardawe ===
Pontardawe 1895
Party	Candidate	Votes	%	±%
Liberal	Ernest Hall Hedley*	578		
Liberal	W.D. Thomas	143		
Majority		435		

=== Plymouth ===
Plymouth 1895
Party	Candidate	Votes	%	±%
Liberal	Henry Watkin Lewis*	603		
Conservative	Arthur Daniel	440		
Majority		163		

=== Pontlottyn ===
Two rival Liberal candidates enabled innkeeper David Benjamin Owen to win by 23 votes from Baptist minister John Penry Williams.

Pontlottyn 1895
Party	Candidate	Votes	%	±%
Conservative	David Benjamin Owen	280		
Liberal	Rev John Penry Williams	257		
Liberal	R. Williams	178		
Conservative	Alfed Phillips	7		
Conservative gain from Liberal		Swing		

=== Pontypridd ===
Pontypridd 1895
Party	Candidate	Votes	%	±%
Liberal	Walter T. Morgan**	unopposed		

=== Porth and Penygraig ===
Porth and Penygraig 1895
Party	Candidate	Votes	%	±%
Liberal	John Jones Griffiths**	779		
Conservative	J.W. Jones	224		
Majority		555		
Liberal hold		Swing		

=== Resolven ===
Resolven 1895
Party	Candidate	Votes	%	±%
Lib-Lab	Isaac Evans*	Unopposed		
Lib-Lab hold		Swing		

=== Sketty ===
Sketty 1895
Party	Candidate	Votes	%	±%
Conservative	Sir Robert Armine Morris	433		
Liberal	Rev John Davies	395		
Conservative gain from Liberal		Swing		

=== Swansea Valley ===
Boundary Change

Swansea Valley 1895
Party	Candidate	Votes	%	±%
Liberal	Llewellyn Davies	unopposed		
Liberal hold		Swing		

=== Treforest ===
Treforest 1895
Party	Candidate	Votes	%	±%
Independent	David Leyshon	684		
Liberal	William Spickett*	520		
Majority		164		

=== Treherbert ===
Treherbert 1895
Party	Candidate	Votes	%	±%
Liberal	William Morgan**	unopposed		
Liberal hold		Swing		

=== Treorchy ===
Treorchy 1895
Party	Candidate	Votes	%	±%
Lib-Lab	Daronwy Isaac*	unopposed		
Lib-Lab hold		Swing		

=== Trealaw and Tonypandy ===
Trealaw and Tonypandy 1895
Party	Candidate	Votes	%	±%
Liberal	William Williams*	497		
Liberal	D. Thomas	400		
Majority		97		
Liberal hold		Swing		

=== Tylorstown and Ynyshir ===
Tylorstown and Ynyshir 1895
Party	Candidate	Votes	%	±%
Liberal	T.H. Morris	unopposed		
Liberal hold		Swing		

=== Ystalyfera ===
Ystalyfera
Party	Candidate	Votes	%	±%
Conservative	Dr David Thomas*	unopposed		
Conservative hold		Swing		

=== Ystrad ===
Clifford Cory in 1912

Ystrad 1895
Party	Candidate	Votes	%	±%
Liberal	Clifford J. Cory*	804		
	J.B. Price	133		
Majority		671		
Liberal hold		Swing		

== Election of aldermen ==
In addition to the 66 councillors the council consisted of 22 county aldermen. Aldermen were elected by the council, and served a six-year term. Following the 1895 election, there were twelve aldermanic vacancies (the additional one following the death of a sitting alderman).

The following aldermen were appointed by the newly elected council. They included three miners' agents who, together with Moses Moses, elected as alderman in 1892, made four labour members on the aldermanic bench. Conversely, following the retirement of Sir William Thomas Lewis, Sir John Llewellyn was now the only Conservative among the aldermen. Lewis and another retiring alderman, the prominent Liberal, Thomas Williams of Gwaelod y Garth, received some votes (presumably from Conservative councillors) but the liberal group held to the convention that only elected councillors could be made aldermen.

- J. T. D. Llewellyn, Conservative, retiring alderman (elected councillor at Lougher and Penderry)
- Walter H. Morgan, Liberal, retiring alderman (elected councillor at Pontypridd)
- John Jones Griffiths, Liberal, retiring alderman (elected councillor at Porth)
- Dr H. Naunton Davies, Liberal, retiring alderman (elected councillor at Cymmer)
- William Morgan, Liberal, retiring alderman (elected councillor at Treherbert)
- Evan Lewis, Liberal (elected councillor at Gellifaelog)
- Richard Lewis, Liberal (elected councillor at Llwynypia and Clydach)
- Isaac Evans, Liberal-Labour (elected councillor at Resolven)
- David Davies, Liberal (elected councillor at Penydarren)
- David Morgan, Liberal-Labour (elected councillor at Gadlys)
- John Thomas, Liberal-Labour (elected councillor at Garw Valley)

elected for three years

- James Barrow, Liberal (elected councillor at Maesteg)

== By-elections ==
=== Cymmer ===
Cymmer by-election 1895
Party	Candidate	Votes	%	±%
Liberal	Dr Naunton Davies**	unopposed		
Liberal hold		Swing		

=== Gadlys by-election ===
Following the election of David Morgan as alderman, Richard Morgan, member for Hirwaun from 1889 until 1895 was selected as Liberal candidate following a well-attended public meeting. As a result of boundary changes, Morgan had contested Llwydcoed against Rees Hopkin Rhys and had been narrowly defeated. Richard Morgan's selection was not immediately accepted and other meetings were held to promote other candidates, including Benjamin Evans. Eventually, however, Richard Morgan was comfortably elected.

Gadlys by-election 1895
Party	Candidate	Votes	%	±%
Liberal	Richard Morgan	763		
	T. Whitty Evans	199		
Majority		564		
Liberal hold		Swing		

=== Garw Valley by-election ===
Following the election of John Thomas, miners' agent, as alderman, D. Johns was elected after a contest with two other Liberal candidates, including Thomas Lewis who was also unsuccessful at the initial election.

Garw Valley by-election 1895
Party	Candidate	Votes	%	±%
Liberal	D. Johns	469		
Liberal	Thomas Lewis	319		
Liberal	J. Maddocks	134		
Majority		150		
Liberal hold		Swing		

=== Gellifaelog by-election ===
Following the election of Evan Lewis as alderman, concerns had been expressed that a split Liberal vote would lead to a Conservative victory. But this did not prove to be the case.

Gellifaelog by-election 1895
Party	Candidate	Votes	%	±%
Liberal	John Evans	281		
Liberal	John Lloyd Atkins	225		
Conservative	Thomas Edward Morgan	154		
Majority		56		
Liberal hold		Swing		

=== Loughor and Penderry by-election ===
Following the election of Sir John Llewelyn as alderman, Samuel Thomas, defeated by Llewelyn at the original election, was now returned. His opponent had sought to succeed Llewelyn on his appointment as alderman in 1889 but was defeated on that occasion by Edward Rice Daniel. This can be considered a Liberal hold as Daniel had stood down at the original election in favour of Llewelyn.

Loughor and Penderry by-election 1895
Party	Candidate	Votes	%	±%
Liberal	Samuel Thomas	601		
Conservative	John Roper Wright	506		
Majority		95		
Liberal hold		Swing		

=== Llwynypia and Clydach by-election ===
Llwynypia and Clydach 1895 by-election
Party	Candidate	Votes	%	±%
Liberal				
Liberal hold		Swing		

=== Maesteg by-election ===
Following the election of James Barrow as alderman, Jenkin Jones, narrowly defeated in a hotly contested initial election, was on this occasion successful.

Maesteg by-election 1895
Party	Candidate	Votes	%	±%
Liberal	Jenkin Jones	1,024		
Liberal	Thomas Rees	759		
Majority		265		
Liberal hold		Swing		

=== Penydarren by-election ===
The by-election took place following the election of David Davies, Glebeland, as alderman. Thomas Williams, Gwaelodygarth, Merthyr, vice-chairman of the previous council, did not seek re-election partly due to the desire of Davies, as the sitting councillor, to contest the seat but also because Williams himself was visiting Palestine and Egypt.

Penydarren by-election 1895
Party	Candidate	Votes	%	±%
Liberal	Thomas Williams**	530		
Conservative	Dan Thomas	372		
Majority		158		

=== Pontypridd by-election ===
Following the re-election of Walter Morgan as alderman, Hopkin Smith Davies, who stood down in his favour, was returned amongst 'great enthusiasm'.

Pontypridd by-election 1895
Party	Candidate	Votes	%	±%
Liberal	Hopkin Smith Davies*	478		
Conservative	R.l. Phillips	381		
Liberal	Patrick Gowan	320		

=== Porth and Penygraig by-election ===
The election followed John Jones Griffiths's re-election as alderman.

Porth and Penygraig by-election 1895
Party	Candidate	Votes	%	±%
Liberal	J.R. Evans	641		
Lib-Lab	Thomas Evans	541		
Majority		100		
Liberal hold		Swing		

=== Resolven by-election ===
Following the election of Isaac Evans as alderman, Daniel Evans of Abergwynfi was elected in a four-cornered contest.

Resolven by-election 1895
Party	Candidate	Votes	%	±%
Liberal	Daniel Evans	388		
Liberal	Llew Howell	357		
Liberal	A. Russell Thomas	272		
Liberal	Edmund Law	194		
Majority		31		
Lib-Lab hold		Swing		

=== Treherbert by-election ===
Following the re-election of William Morgan as alderman, John Walters, who had stood down to enable Morgan to be re-elected, retained his seat.

Treherbert by-election 1895
Party	Candidate	Votes	%	±%
Liberal	John Walters*	600		
Independent	W.H. Davies	307		
Liberal hold		Swing		

== Bibliography ==
- Parry, Jon (1989). "Labour Leaders and Local Politics 1888-1902: The Example of Aberdare". Welsh History Review. 14 (3): 399–416.
- Williams, Chris (1996). Democratic Rhondda: Politics and society 1885-1951. Cardiff: University of Wales Press.
