= 1892 Glamorgan County Council election =

1892 Welsh local government election

The second election to the Glamorgan County Council was held on 8 March 1892. The 1889 election was the first contest and the next was the 1895 election. Glamorgan County Council had been established by the Local Government Act 1888, and the first election held in January 1889. Glamorgan was by far the largest county in Wales in terms of population. The county of Glamorgan was at this time becoming heavily industrialised, although some areas such as the Vale of Glamorgan remained essentially rural. The rise of nonconformist liberalism, especially since the 1860s, throughout Wales, had challenged the prevailing influence of the landed gentry. However, even in 1889, the traditional forces remained influential and no working men were elected to the council. This changed in 1892 with the unopposed return of David Morgan in Aberdare and the success of Isaac Evans in Resolven.

Results are mainly drawn from the South Wales Star.

Most candidates were described either as Liberals or as Conservatives; but these allegiances were fluid, and in most cases there was no evidence of a connection between candidates and local Liberal or Conservative party organisations.

== Overview of the result ==
The Liberal Party was once again triumphant and won a majority of the seats. Indeed, in the contested elections only two Conservative-supported candidates were successful, Edwin Price and Bridgend and Captain Lindsay at Llantwit Fardre, Both stood as nominally Independent candidates. The Liberals regarded their successes at Penarth to be among their most notable victories.

A notable feature of these elections was the return of a number of working men and others as Lib-Lab candidates. this was notable in the Rhondda but also elsewhere. David Morgan (Dai o'r Nant) was returned unopposed at Gadlys, Aberdare and two other miners' agents were elected. In the Garw Valley, John Thomas defeated another Liberal candidate while at Resolven, Isaac Evans defeated the sitting member, Edwards-Vaughan of Rheola.

The Conservatives held a number of seats unopposed and a small number of Independent candidates were returned. These were, in most cases, regarded as Conservatives, for example in Bridgend and Pontypridd.

== Boundary changes ==
There were a limited number of boundary changes at this election, resulting in the abolition of the six two-member wards which existed at the inaugural election in 1889. These were divided, in each case, into two single-member wards, as follows:

1889 two-member ward	1892 single member wards
Llwynypia and Trealaw	Llwynypia and Clydach / Trealaw and Tonypandy
Neath	Neath North / Neath South
Penarth	Penarth North / Penarth South
Penrhiwceiber and Dyffryn	Mountain Ash / Penrhiwceiber
Pentre and Ystrad	Pentre / Ystrad
Treorchy and Treherbert	Treherbert / Treorchy

== Candidates and unopposed returns ==
66 members were returned to the council, all of whom represented single member wards.

There were 37 unopposed returns, as compared to a mere three at the initial election in 1889.

Party	Unopposed Returns
Liberal	23
Conservative	8
Unionist	2
Independent	2
Liberal Unionist	1
Liberal-Labour	1

As shown in the table the vast majority were Liberals, although their number includes Rees Hopkin Rhys who was described as a Liberal at this election. Among the other unopposed returns was Sir John Jones Jenkins at Oystermouth and David Morgan at Gadlys.

== Contested elections ==
The election was fought on largely political lines with the Liberals contesting nearly every seat. In some cases two Liberals faced each other and there was little evidence of an attempt to limit the number of candidates in order to avoid splitting the vote and allowing a candidate of a different political persuasion to win the seat. In many ways this provides evidence that the Liberal Party in Glamorgan was such a broad coalition that it encompassed both leading coal owners and active trade unionists. As such, tensions were almost inevitable.

=== Aberdare Valley ===
At the previous election, three Conservatives were returned for the five seats in the Aberdare area. On this occasion, four of the seats were won by Liberals, including David Morgan at Gadlys. The remaining Conservative, Rees Hopkin Rhys was now nominally at least, returned as a Liberal.

=== Cardiff and South Glamorgan ===
In this area the Conservatives were stronger than in the industrial valleys. However, the Liberals gained ground, notably by capturing both seats at Penarth.

=== Merthyr Tydfil ===
The Liberals also captured the majority of the seats in Merthyr Tydfil, although the Conservatives retained a firm grip on Dowlais and neighbouring Caeharris. At Cyfaththfa, the Labour candidate won a notable victory.

=== Rhondda District ===
In contrast to the somewhat raucous campaign three years earlier, the campaign in the Rhondda was a peaceful one although a number of the wards were closely contested. Most of the pits were closed early, the weather was fine. Vehicles belonging to various tradesmen conducted the electors to the polls and "scores of miners from different pits were to be observed hastily trudging home to wash themselves before recording their votes for their favourite candidates. One striking feature in connection with the elections was the conspicuous absence of drunken persons about the booths and in the streets, and the quietness and the amicable feeling prevailing among the supporters of the various candidates, who cordially shook hands with each other and chatted together freely for some time."

== Retiring aldermen ==
Before the election there was a widespread assumption, shared by a number of the retiring aldermen, that they would be automatically re-elected as aldermen without seeking election. In the weeks before the election, there was a debate in the press about whether sitting aldermen could contest the election. This debate was fuelled to a considerable extent by personal rivalries and it soon became clear that there was nothing to prohibit sitting aldermen to seek election as councillors.

Of the eleven retiring aldermen, only three sought re-election and it appears that many of the others had assumed, wrongly as it transpired (see below, 'Election of Aldermen') that they would be-appointed without contesting an election. Both Gwilym Jones at Dyffryn and Aaron Davies at Pontlottyn were successful, while Rees Harries was returned unopposed at Llandeilo Talybont.

== Ward results ==
=== Aberaman ===
Thomas Davies had been elected at a by-election in 1889 following the elevation of T.P. White to the aldermanic bench. White had moved from Cwmaman to Maesycymmer during the intervening period and did not seek re-election.

Aberaman 1892
Party	Candidate	Votes	%	±%
Liberal	Thomas Davies*	unopposed		
Liberal hold		Swing		

=== Aberavon ===
J.M. Smith had been elected at a by-election in 1889 following the elevation of Richard Jenkins to the aldermanic bench.

Aberavon 1892
Party	Candidate	Votes	%	±%
Independent	John Morgan Smith*	unopposed		
Independent hold		Swing		

=== Aberdare Town ===
Aberdare Town 1892
Party	Candidate	Votes	%	±%
Liberal	David Price Davies*	unopposed		
Liberal hold		Swing		

=== Barry and Cadoxton ===
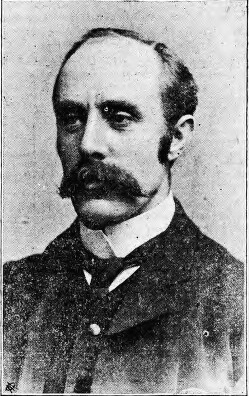
John Claxton Meggitt

John Claxton Meggitt had been elected at a by-election in 1889 following the elevation of John Cory to the aldermanic bench. In 1892 it was anticipated that Cory would be re-appointed as an alderman without facing the electorate, although Meggitt offered to stand down when this proved not to be the case. After the election, when the Liberal group decided that aldermen would be chosen only from amongst elected members, Meggitt reluctantly agreed to be nominated so that Cory could take the vacant seat (see 'By-elections' below).

Barry and Cadoxton 1892
Party	Candidate	Votes	%	±%
Liberal	John Claxton Meggitt*	unopposed		
Liberal hold		Swing		

=== Bridgend ===
The previous Conservative member, Lord Dunraven, elected in 1889, only attended two meetings of the council. The Liberal press, while deploring the failure of the Liberal candidate, described as a shrewd businessman, welcomed the fact that the interests of the town would now be represented. Three years later, when the Liberals captured the seat for the first time, it was recalled that Price, upon his victory, was carried shoulder-high to the Conservative Club. Although nominally a Conservative loss this was not how the result was widely regarded as the time.

Bridgend 1892
Party	Candidate	Votes	%	±%
Independent	Edwin Price	382		
Liberal	D H. Lloyd	356		
Majority		26		
Independent hold		Swing		

=== Briton Ferry ===
At a by-election in 1889 following the elevation of William Hunter to the aldermanic bench, Jenkin Hill was defeated by the Conservative candidate, W.P. Struve. Struve did not seek re-election, allowing Hill to capture the seat in a straight fight with another Liberal candidate.

Briton Ferry 1892
Party	Candidate	Votes	%	±%
Liberal	Jenkin Hill	593		
Liberal	Daniel Lewis Jones (Cyn Alaw)	228		
Majority		365		
Liberal gain from Conservative		Swing		

=== Caeharris ===
Caeharris 1892
Party	Candidate	Votes	%	±%
Unionist	Edward Pritchard Martin*	unopposed		
Unionist hold		Swing		

=== Caerphilly ===
Henry Anthony had been elected at a by-election in 1889 following the elevation of David Lewis to the aldermanic bench.

Caerphilly 1892
Party	Candidate	Votes	%	±%
Liberal	Henry Anthony*	733		
Liberal	Richard Hill Male	542		
Majority		191		
Liberal hold		Swing		

=== Coedffranc ===
Coedffranc 1892
Party	Candidate	Votes	%	±%
Conservative	J. Newell Moore*	unopposed		
Conservative hold		Swing		

=== Coity ===
Coity 1892
Party	Candidate	Votes	%	±%
Liberal	William Howell	unopposed		
Liberal hold		Swing		

=== Cowbridge ===
J.S. Gibbon had captured the seat for the Conservatives at a by-election in 1889 following the elevation of Thomas Rees to the aldermanic bench.

Cowbridge 1892
Party	Candidate	Votes	%	±%
Conservative	John Samuel Gibbon*	Unopposed		
Conservative hold		Swing		

=== Cwmavon ===
Cwmavon 1892
Party	Candidate	Votes	%	±%
Liberal	Herbert Evans	503		
Liberal	Rev. Daniel Evans	366		
Majority		137		
Liberal hold		Swing		

=== Cyfarthfa ===
Cyfarthfa 1892
Party	Candidate	Votes	%	±%
Lib-Lab	Thomas Thomas	856		
Liberal	Joseph Owen	310		
Majority		546		
Lib-Lab gain from Unionist		Swing		

=== Cymmer ===
At a by-election in 1889 following the elevation of Dr Henry Naunton Davies to the aldermanic bench, his brother, Dr Evan Naunton Davies had been elected. In 1892, Evan Naunton Davies did not seek re-election, leading to a contest between the Lib-Lab candidate, Moses Moses, and Idris Williams, a native of the Rhondda and a prominent if somewhat controversial figure in the public life of the valley. Moses thus became the Rhondda's first labour county councillor. He was supported at the election by the Porth Labour Committee, an ad hoc organisation which did not re-appear at subsequent elections.

Cymmer 1892
Party	Candidate	Votes	%	±%
Lib-Lab	Moses Moses	485		
Liberal	Idris Williams	459		
Majority		26		
Lib-Lab hold		Swing		

=== Dinas Powys ===
Dinas Powys 1892
Party	Candidate	Votes	%	±%
Conservative	Oliver Henry Jones*	Unopposed		
Conservative hold		Swing		

=== Dowlais ===
Dowlais 1892
Party	Candidate	Votes	%	±%
Conservative	Thomas Jenkins*	unopposed		
Conservative hold		Swing		

=== Dulais Valley ===
Dulais Valley 1892
Party	Candidate	Votes	%	±%
Conservative	Evan Evans Bevan*	unopposed		
Conservative hold		Swing		

=== Ferndale ===
Ferndale 1892
Party	Candidate	Votes	%	±%
Liberal	Morgan Thomas	unopposed		
Liberal hold		Swing		

=== Gadlys ===
Although Benjamin Evans, the so-called 'Bishop of Gadlys', had initially intended to contest the seat he withdrew in favour of David Morgan, miners' agent. The two men became bitter rivals in later years.

Gadlys 1892
Party	Candidate	Votes	%	±%
Lib-Lab	David Morgan	Unopposed	N/A	N/A
Lib-Lab gain from Independent				

=== Garw Valley ===
The elected member was a miners' agent and ally of Mabon.

Garw Valley 1892
Party	Candidate	Votes	%	±%
Liberal	John Thomas	469		
Liberal	Thomas Lewis	388		
Majority		81		
Liberal hold		Swing		

=== Gellifaelog ===
Gellifaelog 1892
Party	Candidate	Votes	%	±%
Liberal	Evan Lewis	470		
Liberal	Patrick Mansfield	209		
Majority		261		
Liberal hold		Swing		

=== Gelligaer ===
Gelligaer 1892
Party	Candidate	Votes	%	±%
Independent	Henry William Martin	unopposed		
Independent hold		Swing		

=== Gower ===
Gower 1892
Party	Candidate	Votes	%	±%
Liberal	Frank Cory Yeo*	unopposed		
Liberal hold		Swing		

=== Hirwaun ===
Morgan, returned at a by-election in 1889, was returned unopposed after rumours that he would be opposed by Owen Harris, a Trecynon tradesman involved in local politics, proved unfounded.

Hirwaun 1892
Party	Candidate	Votes	%	±%
Liberal	Rev Richard Morgan*	unopposed		
Liberal hold		Swing		

=== Kibbor ===
Kibbor 1892
Party	Candidate	Votes	%	±%
Conservative	Henry Lewis*	unopposed		
Conservative hold		Swing		

=== Llandaff ===
Llandaff 1892
Party	Candidate	Votes	%	±%
Conservative	Robert Forrest*	unopposed		
Conservative hold		Swing		

=== Llandeilo Talybont ===
Rees Harries had been elected alderman in 1889 and Thomas Freeman, who served as Mayor of Swansea in 1889-90 was returned unopposed at the ensuing by-election. At one stage it was reported that Freeman would contest the seat at this election, possibly because of the uncertainty over whether sitting aldermen could stand. However, Rees Harries decided to contest the seat and Freeman stood aside in his favour. Harries was not among the new aldermen elected by the council.

Llandeilo Talybont 1892
Party	Candidate	Votes	%	±%
Liberal	Rees Harries**	unopposed		
Liberal hold		Swing		

=== Llansamlet ===
Llansamlet 1892
Party	Candidate	Votes	%	±%
Liberal	William Sims	unoppposed		
Liberal hold		Swing		

=== Llantrisant ===
Llantrisant 1892
Party	Candidate	Votes	%	±%
Liberal	J. Blandy Jenkins*	unopposed		
Liberal hold		Swing		

=== Llantwit Vardre ===
This contest was regarded as the only instance in the county where a Liberal was ousted by a Conservative. Lindsay, although running as an Independent was regarded as a Conservative.

Llantwit Vardre 1892
Party	Candidate	Votes	%	±%
Independent	Capt. Morgan Lindsay	403		
Liberal	Edward Edwards*	341		
Majority		62		
Liberal hold		Swing		

=== Llwydcoed ===
Rhys, a prominent figure in the public life of Aberdare for decades and Chairman of the Local Board of Health, was returned unopposed. Although described as a Liberal he had in the past been associated with the Conservative Party and his return in 1889 had been regarded as a defeat for the local Liberal Association.

Llwydcoed 1892
Party	Candidate	Votes	%	±%
Liberal	Rees Hopkin Rhys	Unopposed	N/A	N/A
Liberal hold				

=== Llwynypia and Clydach ===
Llwynypia and Clydach 1892
Party	Candidate	Votes	%	±%
Liberal	Richard Morris	unopposed		
Liberal hold		Swing		

=== Lougher and Penderry ===
Lougher and Penderry 1892
Party	Candidate	Votes	%	±%
Liberal	Edward Rice Daniel	unopposed		
Liberal hold		Swing		

=== Maesteg ===
Maesteg 1892
Party	Candidate	Votes	%	±%
Liberal	James Barrow	unopposed		
Liberal hold		Swing		

=== Margam ===
Margam 1892
Party	Candidate	Votes	%	±%
Liberal	Arthur Pendarves Vivian	630		
Liberal	Llewellyn Howell	328		
Majority		307		
Liberal hold		Swing		

=== Merthyr Town ===
Merthyr Town 1892
Party	Candidate	Votes	%	±%
Unionist	Frank James	unopposed		
Unionist hold		Swing		

=== Merthyr Vale ===
Merthyr Vale 1892
Party	Candidate	Votes	%	±%
Liberal	David Prosser	538		
Liberal	Walter Bell*	523		
Majority		153		
Liberal hold		Swing		

=== Morriston ===
Morriston 1892
Party	Candidate	Votes	%	±%
Liberal	William Williams	unopposed		
Liberal hold		Swing		

=== Mountain Ash ===
Mountain Ash 1892
Party	Candidate	Votes	%	±%
Liberal	Gwilym Jones*	530		
Liberal	Hon. H. Campbell Bruce	178		
Majority		352		
Liberal hold		Swing		

=== Neath (North) ===
Neath (North) 1892
Party	Candidate	Votes	%	±%
Unionist	John Henry Rowland	499		
Independent Liberal	Edmund Law	318		
Majority		181		
Unionist hold		Swing		

=== Neath (South) ===
John Arnold died, aged 49, shortly before the next election in 1895.

Neath (South) 1892
Party	Candidate	Votes	%	±%
Liberal	John Arnold	391		
Independent	W.B. Trick	362		
Majority		29		
Liberal hold		Swing		

=== Newcastle ===
Newcastle 1892
Party	Candidate	Votes	%	±%
Liberal	Thomas J. Hughes	unopposed		
Liberal hold		Swing		

=== Ogmore ===
Ogmore 1892
Party	Candidate	Votes	%	±%
Liberal	Evan Evans*	414		
Independent	J.D. Nicholl	386		
Majority		28		
Liberal hold		Swing		

=== Ogmore Valley ===
Ogmore Valley 1892
Party	Candidate	Votes	%	±%
Liberal	John Williams	unopposed		
Liberal hold		Swing		

=== Oystermouth ===
Oystermouth 1892
Party	Candidate	Votes	%	±%
Liberal Unionist	Sir John Jones Jenkins	unopposed		
Liberal Unionist hold		Swing		

=== Penarth North ===
This was regarded by the Liberals as one of the most significant contests, as David Morgan's personal popularity was expected to be a factor.

Penarth North 1892
Party	Candidate	Votes	%	±%
Liberal	W.B. Shepherd	307		
Conservative	David Morgan	224		
Independent	D. Cornwall	59		
Majority		83		
Liberal hold		Swing		

=== Penarth South ===
The Liberal candidate, who was said to be popular among Conservatives as well as Liberals, had refused to stand as an Independent.

Penarth South 1892
Party	Candidate	Votes	%	±%
Liberal	J.P. Jones	302		
Conservative	Henry Oakdell Fisher*	210		
Majority		92		
Liberal hold		Swing		

=== Penrhiwceiber ===
Penrhiwceiber 1892
Party	Candidate	Votes	%	±%
	Dr. R. W. Jones	unopposed		
	Liberal hold	Swing		

=== Pentre ===
Morris, the sitting member and official Rhondda Labour and Liberal Association candidate in 1889, found himself at odds with the RLLA local committee which chose estate went Elias Henry Davies to oppose him. The third Liberal candidate, Daniel Eynon, was a colliery manager.

Pentre 1892
Party	Candidate	Votes	%	±%
Liberal	Richard Morris*	401		
Liberal	Elias Henry Davies	313		
Liberal	Daniel Eynon	292		
Majority		88		
Liberal hold		Swing		

=== Penydarren ===
Penydarren 1892
Party	Candidate	Votes	%	±%
Liberal	David Davies*	584		
Liberal	Thomas Williams	415		
Majority		169		
Liberal hold		Swing		

=== Plymouth ===
Plymouth 1892
Party	Candidate	Votes	%	±%
Liberal	Henry W.Lewis	unopposed		
Liberal hold		Swing		

=== Pontardawe ===
Pontardawe 1892
Party	Candidate	Votes	%	±%
Liberal	Ernest Hall Hedley*	511		
Liberal	John Beynon	291		
Majority		220		
Liberal hold		Swing		

=== Pontlottyn ===
Pontlottyn 1892
Party	Candidate	Votes	%	±%
Liberal	Rev Aaron Davies**	unopposed		
Liberal hold		Swing		

=== Pontypridd ===
Pontypridd 1892
Party	Candidate	Votes	%	±%
Liberal	Hopkin Smith Davies	752		
Conservative	W. Jones-Powell	632		
Majority		120		
Liberal hold		Swing		

=== Porth and Penygraig ===
Morgan Williams. lodge secretary at Ynyshir Colliery, was supported at the election by the Porth Labour Committee, an ad hoc organisation which did not re-appear at subsequent elections.

Porth and Penygraig 1892
Party	Candidate	Votes	%	±%
Lib-Lab	Morgan Williams	458		
Conservative	Thomas Jones	316		
Majority		142		
Lib-Lab hold		Swing		

=== Resolven ===
Resolven 1892
Party	Candidate	Votes	%	±%
Lib-Lab	Isaac Evans	752		
Conservative	J. Edwards Vaughan	471		
Majority		181		
Lib-Lab gain from Conservative		Swing		

=== Sketty ===
Sketty 1892
Party	Candidate	Votes	%	±%
Liberal	John Powell	unopposed		
Liberal hold		Swing		

=== Tirdeunaw ===
Tirdeunaw 1892
Party	Candidate	Votes	%	±%
Liberal	Sir H. Hussey Vivian	Unopposed	N/A	N/A
Liberal hold				

=== Treforest ===
The sitting councillor did not seek re-election and it was felt that the young Liberal candidate, 'Willie' Spickett faced a formidable opponent in the Chair of the Pontypridd Local Board of Health. Leyshon stood as an Independent but was regarded as a Conservative candidate.

Treforest 1892
Party	Candidate	Votes	%	±%
Liberal	William Spickett	576		
Independent	David Leyshon	534		
Majority		42		
Liberal hold		Swing		

=== Treherbert ===
Treherbert 1892
Party	Candidate	Votes	%	±%
Lib-Lab	John Walters	669		
Liberal	Dr. Montague D. Makuna	220		
Majority		449		
Lib-Lab hold		Swing		

=== Treorchy ===
Daronwy Isaac, miners' agent and ally of Mabon, stood as an unofficial candidate although he was President of the Rhondda Labour and Liberal Association. His opponent, William Morris was minister of Noddfa, Treorchy and already active in local government as a member of the Ystradyfodwg School Board.

Treorchy 1892
Party	Candidate	Votes	%	±%
Lib-Lab	Daronwy Isaac	430		
Liberal	Rev William Morris	350		
Majority		80		
Lib-Lab hold		Swing		

=== Trealaw and Tonypandy ===
The contest was reported to have been conducted with bitterness and bad feeling. Mr. Williams's record on the council is a very satisfac- tory one. and it would have been hard indeed not to return one who has been tried and not found wanting. At the same time we are sorry that the Council should be without the services of Mr. T. P. Jenkins, who for many years was the chairman of the Rhondda Liberal and Labour Association, the first labour magistrate in Wales, and a man of great business capacity. The conflict between two good Liberals was most unfortunate. especially since it has generated so much ill feeling, and it is unfortunate that Mr. Jenkins did not elect to stand for another constituency against a Tory candidate.

Trealaw and Tonypandy 1892
Party	Candidate	Votes	%	±%
Liberal	William Gwrtydd Williams*	456		
Liberal	T. Pascoe Jenkins	331		
Majority		125		
Liberal hold		Swing		

=== Tylorstown and Ynyshir ===
Tylorstown and Ynyshir 1892
Party	Candidate	Votes	%	±%
Liberal	W.H. Mathias	unopposed		
Liberal hold		Swing		

=== Ystalyfera ===
Ystalyfera 1892
Party	Candidate	Votes	%	±%
Conservative	Dr David Thomas*	unopposed		
Conservative hold		Swing		

=== Ystrad ===
Thomas, the retiring councillor, announced that he would not seek re-election but reversed his decision on learning that Cory would be the new candidate.

Clifford Cory

Ystrad 1892
Party	Candidate	Votes	%	±%
Liberal	Clifford J. Cory	775		
Lib-Lab	David Thomas*	706		
Majority		69		
Liberal hold		Swing		

== Election of aldermen ==
In addition to the 66 councillors the council consisted of 22 county aldermen. Aldermen were elected by the council, and served a six-year term. Following the 1892 election, there were eleven Aldermanic vacancies.

At a meeting of the South Wales Liberal Federation in Cardiff, a decision was taken that only elected members be elected aldermen. Even the Liberal journal, the South Wales Star thought that it was unfortunate that this ruling was made after the election when only three sitting aldermen had stood.

Two of the three retiring aldermen who had contested the election were re-elected to the aldermanic bench, namely Aaron Davies and W.H. Mathias. Rees Harries was not re-elected. J.C. Meggitt consented to be elected an alderman in order to allow John Cory to return as councillor for Barry (see below). The election of Moses Moses suggests that Liberal representatives on the County Council were more prepared than local leaders in the Rhondda to advance labour representatives.

The following aldermen were appointed by the newly elected council.

- David Price Davies, Liberal (elected councillor at Aberdare Town)
- John Powell, Liberal (elected councillor at Sketty)
- Sir Hussey Vivian MP, Liberal, elected councillor at Tirdeunaw
- Herbert Evans, Liberal, elected councillor at Cwmavon
- Rev Aaron Davies, Liberal, retiring alderman (elected Councillor at Pontlottyn)
- Henry Anthony, Liberal (elected councillor at Caerphilly)
- Moses Moses, Liberal-Labour (elected councillor at Cymmer)
- John Williams, Liberal (elected councillor at Ogmore Valley)
- W.H. Mathias, Liberal (elected councillor at Tylorstown and Ynyshir)
- Gwilym Jones, Liberal, retiring alderman (elected councillor at Mountain Ash)
- J.C. Meggitt, Liberal (elected councillor at Barry and Cadoxton)

== By-elections ==
=== Aberdare Town by-election ===
In the Town Ward, Aberdare, following David Price Davies's election as alderman, the contest was said to have created an intense amount of enthusiasm and more excitement than has been known to an election in this parish for many years.

Aberdare Town by-election 1892
Party	Candidate	Votes	%	±%
Liberal	Thomas Thomas	702		
Liberal	Griffith George	512		
Liberal hold		Swing		

=== Barry and Cadoxton by-election ===
John Cory was returned unopposed following John Claxton Meggitt's reluctant elevation to the aldermanic bench to make way for him.

Barry and Cadoxton by-election 1892
Party	Candidate	Votes	%	±%
Liberal	John Cory**	unopposed		
Liberal hold		Swing		

=== Caerphilly by-election ===
Following Henry Anthony's election as alderman, Richard Hill-Male, who had opposed him at the recent election, was now chosen as the official nominee of the Liberal Association. However, David Lewis, elected as Liberal councillor in 1889 and whose aldermanic term had lapsed also chose to contest the seat, and a number of lively meetings took place. On polling day, Hill-Male was returned with a comfortable majority.

Caerphilly by-election 1892
Party	Candidate	Votes	%	±%
Liberal	Richard Hill Male	660		
Independent	Samuel Evans	346		
Liberal	David Lewis**	330		
Majority		191		
Liberal hold		Swing		

=== Cwmavon by-election ===
The by-election followed the election of Herbert Evans as alderman.

Cwmavon by-election 1892
Party	Candidate	Votes	%	±%
Liberal	Thomas Davies	444		
Liberal	Rev Daniel Evans	431		
Majority		13		
Liberal hold		Swing		

=== Cymmer by-election ===
Idris Williams, narrowly defeated at the recent election by Moses Moses. was returned unopposed after a stormy meeting at Bethania Chapel, Dinas, when only members of the Liberal Association (the so-called 'Three Hundred') were allowed to vote. Eventually, Williams, who was also narrowly defeated at the 1889 election, was unanimously selected. Technically, the return of Williams represented a Liberal gain.

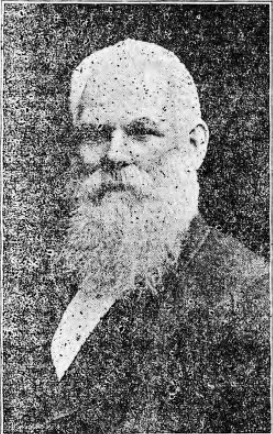
Idris Williams

Cymmer by-election 1892
Party	Candidate	Votes	%	±%
Liberal	Idris Williams	unopposed		
Liberal hold		Swing		

=== Mountain Ash by-election ===
Mountain Ash by-election 1892
Party	Candidate	Votes	%	±%
Liberal				
Liberal hold		Swing		

=== Ogmore Valley by-election ===
William Llewellyn, grocer, of Gwalia House, Tynewydd defeated William Jenkins, Ystradfechan, Treorchy, mining engineer at the Ocean Collieries.

Ogmore Valley by-election 1892
Party	Candidate	Votes	%	±%
Liberal	William Llewellyn	543		
Liberal	William Jenkins	510		
Majority		33		
Liberal hold		Swing		

=== Pontlottyn by-election ===
Pontlottyn by-election 1892
Party	Candidate	Votes	%	±%
Liberal	Rev J.P. Williams	unopposed		
Liberal hold		Swing		

=== Sketty by-election ===
Following the election of John Powell as alderman, Robert Armine Morris, a prominent figure in the municipal life of Swansea, and a member of a leading family in the industrial life of the district, won the seat for the Conservatives. The campaign included a public meeting addressed by both candidates. Prominent local Liberals were alleged to have at least tacitly supported Morris.

Sketty by-election 1892
Party	Candidate	Votes	%	±%
Conservative	Robert Armine Morris	454		
Liberal	W. Fred Richards	409		
Liberal	Francis Richard Crawshay	57		
Majority		45		
Conservative gain from Liberal		Swing		

=== Tirdeunaw by-election ===
Following the election of Sir H. Hussey Vivian, the chairman of the council, as an alderman, two Liberal candidates contested the vacancy. Thomas Freeman was a past Mayor of Swansea and a prominent figure in the public life of the town who had also served as councillor for Llandeilo Talybont on the first council. He was defeated by Llewellyn Davies who had unsuccessfully contested Margam against A.P. Vivian in 1889.

Tirdeunaw by-election 1892
Party	Candidate	Votes	%	±%
Liberal	Llewellyn Davies	137		
Liberal	Thomas Freeman*	75		
Majority		62		
Liberal hold		Swing		

=== Tylorstown and Ynyshir by-election ===
The candidate was returned unopposed following a meeting of electors at Hermon, Pontygwaith. This outcome appears to have been challenged by the supporters of a certain Mr Fenwick, and a further meeting was held at which Hughes was again chosen, by 80 votes against 67 for Fenwick.

Tylorstown and Ynyshir by-election 1892
Party	Candidate	Votes	%	±%
Liberal	Rev J.D. Hughes	unopposed		
Liberal hold		Swing		

== Bibliography ==
- Parry, Jon (1989). "Labour Leaders and Local Politics 1888-1902: The Example of Aberdare". Welsh History Review. 14 (3): 399–416.
- Williams, Chris (1996). Democratic Rhondda: Politics and society 1885-1951. Cardiff: University of Wales Press.
