= 1889 Glamorgan County Council election =

1889 Welsh local government election

The first election to the Glamorgan County Council was held on 17 January 1889. Results were announced over several days. They were followed by the 1892 election. The authority, by far the largest county in Wales in terms of population, was established by the Local Government Act 1888. The county of Glamorgan was at this time becoming heavily industrialised although some areas such as the Vale of Glamorgan remained essentially rural.

== Overview of the result ==
The rise of nonconformist liberalism, especially since the 1860s, throughout Wales, had challenged the prevailing influence of the landed gentry. However, even in 1889, the traditional forces remained influential and no working men were elected to the Council. For many weeks prior to the election there was lively campaigning in most wards and on election day, 'there was great interest manifested in the proceedings, and at most of the polling places a great many votes were recorded.'

As in most parts of Wales, the Liberal Party was triumphant and won a majority of the seats. The Liberal members elected ranged however, from traditional landowners such as Henry Hussey Vivian, through indigenous coalowners such as F. L. Davis to nonconformist radicals like the Rev Aaron Davies, Pontlottyn. A vigorous campaign was fought by the Liberals, which was reported in detail in the local press.

The following is a summary of the council composition following the election. The figures shown are the number of councillors plus aldermen. For instance 13 + 2 indicates 13 councillors and 2 aldermen.

Glamorgan County Council election result 1889
Party	Seats	Gains	Losses	Net gain/loss	Seats %	Votes %	Votes	+/−
Liberal								
Conservative								
Unionist								
Labour								
Independent								
Other parties								

== Candidates and unopposed returns ==
66 members were returned to the Council. There were 6 wards that returned two members while the other 54 wards returned one member only.

Most wards were contested by Liberal and Conservative candidates, although several of the latter stood as Independents. In many cases, Liberals fought each other.

There were only three unopposed returns, all of whom were Liberals. Frederick Lewis Davis, defeated by Mabon at the Rhondda election in 1885 was returned unopposed in Ferndale as was W.H. Mathias at another Rhondda ward. The third unopposed return was David Davies in Morriston.

== Contested elections ==
Most candidates were described as either Liberals or Conservatives but these allegiances were fluid and, in some cases, there was little evidence of a connection between candidates and local Liberal or Conservative party organisations.

=== Aberdare and Merthyr Districts ===
There were five seats in the Aberdare district, namely Aberaman, Aberdare Town, Gadlys, Hirwaun and Llwydcoed and the return of three Conservatives in this predominantly radical and working-class community excited some comment. The three Conservatives, Sir William Thomas Lewis, Rees Hopkin Rhys and James Lewis, had all been active in the public life of the valley for many years, and their return owed as much to their local influence as to their politics. The nominally Liberal local paper, the Aberdare Times, regretted that the local Liberal Association chose to run candidates against these prominent local figures. Upon the return of all three, a demonstration was held where (according to the admittedly anti-Liberal Aberdare Times), 'all classes of the people united to mark their sense of the pronounced triumph over the clique who presume to act in the name of the Liberal Association.'

In the Merthyr Tydfil area, however, Liberal candidates were more successful but here too the Conservatives performed strongly.

=== Rhondda District ===
In the Rhondda district the success of William Abraham (Mabon) at the 1885 General Election had led to the emergence of a Rhondda Liberal and Labour Association within which working class leaders were active. At the 1889 election the Association advanced a slate of ten candidates, nine of whom were successful. this level of organisation contrasted sharply with other parts of the county. It is also significant that most of the official Liberal candidates had supported the official Liberal candidate, Frederick Davis, in 1885, rather than the Lib-Lab Mabon. The relative unity of the valley Liberals in these elections is illustrated by a meeting held at the Treorchy Board Schools to support the candidatures of William Morgan and J.S. Edwards at Treherbert and Treorchy respectively. The meeting was chaired by William Morris, minister of Noddfa, Treorchy and addressed by both Daronwy Isaac and Mabon himself.

== The new council ==
The first meeting of the council was held at the Gwyn Hall in Neath and Sir Hussey Vivian MP elected to the chair. The Liberal group did agree on a list of aldermen before hand but they were not as cohesive as in other counties in using a block vote.

One of the main debates related to the venue for meetings, with the claims of Neath and Pontypridd being most prominent. The Bridgend Local Board of Health had petitioned Lord Dunraven to lobby for that town to be considered.

== Ward results ==
=== Aberaman ===
This contest was widely reported and was a significant victory for a local tradesman, T.P. White, over a leading colliery official who later became a prominent figure in the South Wales and Monmouthshire Coalowners' Association. White had been chosen as Liberal candidate after a public meeting at Saron Chapel, Aberaman. In a letter to the press he referred to pressure from colliery officials and sought to re-assure the electors that there was a secret ballot.

Aberaman 1889
Party	Candidate	Votes	%	±%
Liberal	Thomas Phillip White	769	61.6	
Conservative	Edmund Mills Hann	480	38.4	
Majority		289	23.2	
Liberal win (new seat)				

=== Aberavon ===
Aberavon 1889
Party	Candidate	Votes	%	±%
Liberal	Richard Jenkins	401	53.5	
Conservative	John Morgan Smith	348	46.5	
Majority		53	7.0	
Liberal win (new seat)				

=== Aberdare Town ===
Aberdare Town 1889
Party	Candidate	Votes	%	±%
Liberal	David Price Davies	Unopposed		
Liberal win (new seat)				

=== Barry and Cadoxton ===
Barry and Cadoxton 1889
Party	Candidate	Votes	%	±%
Liberal	John Cory	Unopposed		
Liberal win (new seat)				

=== Bridgend ===
Bridgend 1889
Party	Candidate	Votes	%	±%
Conservative	Lord Dunraven	Unopposed		
Conservative win (new seat)				

=== Briton Ferry ===
Briton Ferry 1889
Party	Candidate	Votes	%	±%
Liberal	William Hunter	353	53.8	
Conservative	G.H. Davey	303	46.2	
Majority		50	7.6	
Liberal win (new seat)				

=== Caeharris ===
E.P. Martin was regarded as the candidate of the Dowlais Iron Company and was said to have dominated the contest from the outset.

Caeharris 1889
Party	Candidate	Votes	%	±%
Unionist	Edward Pritchard Martin	762		
Liberal	Evan Lewis	133		
Majority		629		
Unionist win (new seat)				

=== Caerphilly ===
Caerphilly 1889
Party	Candidate	Votes	%	±%
Liberal	David Lewis	531		
Liberal	Henry Anthony	406		
Majority		125		
Liberal win (new seat)				

=== Coedffranc ===
Coedffranc 1889
Party	Candidate	Votes	%	±%
Conservative	John Newall Moore	451		
Liberal	Samuel T. Evans	319		
Majority		132		
Conservative win (new seat)				

=== Coity ===
Coity 1889
Party	Candidate	Votes	%	±%
Liberal	William Howell	564		
Independent	R. Evans	164		
Majority		400		
Liberal win (new seat)				

=== Cowbridge ===
Cowbridge 1889
Party	Candidate	Votes	%	±%
Liberal	Thomas Rees	334		
Independent	Rees Thomas	322		
Conservative	R.T. Bassett	240		
Majority		12		
Liberal win (new seat)				

=== Cwmavon ===
Cwmavon 1889
Party	Candidate	Votes	%	±%
Liberal	Herbert Evans	415		
Conservative	J. Stanley	387		
Majority		28		
Liberal win (new seat)				

=== Cyfarthfa ===
Cyfarthfa 1889
Party	Candidate	Votes	%	±%
Unionist	W. T. Crawshay	Unopposed		
Unionist win (new seat)				

=== Cymmer ===
Henry Naunton Davies was opposed by T. Griffiths, manager of Cymmer Colliery and a member of the Ystradyfodwg Local Board.

Cymmer 1889
Party	Candidate	Votes	%	±%
Liberal	Henry Naunton Davies	785		
Independent	T. Griffiths	311		
Majority		474		
Liberal win (new seat)				

=== Dinas Powys ===
Dinas Powys 1889
Party	Candidate	Votes	%	±%
Conservative	Oliver Henry Jones JP	443		
Liberal	W. Jenkins	271		
Majority		172		
Conservative win (new seat)				

=== Dowlais ===
Dowlais 1889
Party	Candidate	Votes	%	±%
Conservative	Thomas Jenkins	469		
Liberal	David Jones	443		
Majority		26		
Conservative win (new seat)				

=== Dulais Valley ===
Evans Bevan, owner of the anthracite colliery at Seven Sisters, was a prominent businessman and industrialist. His return reflected his social status in the recently developed Dulais Valley.

Dulais Valley 1889
Party	Candidate	Votes	%	±%
Conservative	Evan Evans Bevan	320		
Conservative	M.S. Williams	223		
Liberal	Rev D. Glyn Davies	213		
Majority		97		
Conservative win (new seat)				

=== Ferndale ===
Ferndale 1889
Party	Candidate	Votes	%	±%
Liberal	Frederick Lewis Davis	Unopposed		
Liberal win (new seat)				

=== Gadlys ===
James Lewis had been active in the public life of the Aberdare Valley for many years and his candidacy was supported by many Liberals, even though his politics were regarded as Conservative.

Gadlys 1889
Party	Candidate	Votes	%	±%
Independent	James Lewis	902	68.9	
Liberal	T.J. Jones	407	31.1	
Majority		495	37.8	
Independent win (new seat)				

=== Garw Valley ===
Garw Valley 1889
Party	Candidate	Votes	%	±%
Liberal	Dr Edward John Parry	Unopposed	N/A	N/A
Liberal win (new seat)				

=== Gellifaelog ===
Gellifaelog 1889
Party	Candidate	Votes	%	±%
Liberal	Gwilym C. James	436		
Independent	T. Jones	131		
Majority		305		
Liberal win (new seat)				

=== Gelligaer ===
Gelligaer 1889
Party	Candidate	Votes	%	±%
Conservative	Henry William Martin	510		
Liberal	W. Coslett Beddoe	478		
Majority		62		
Conservative win (new seat)				

=== Gower ===
Gower 1889
Party	Candidate	Votes	%	±%
Liberal	Frank Cory Yeo	478		
Conservative	R.A. Essery	328		
Majority		806		
Liberal win (new seat)				

=== Hirwaun ===
The contest was marked by accusations (originally made at the time of the Glamorgan county election of 1880) that Lewis, as a prominent coal owner and land agent, had refused requests by nonconformists for land to build chapels. He publicly refuted these allegations, at a meeting held at Ebenezer, Trecynon. Lewis's supporters also countered these claims by publishing old correspondence, including a letter by the late Thomas Price which refuted the accusations. There is evidence that Lewis's personal popularity transcended any political considerations.

Hirwaun 1889
Party	Candidate	Votes	%	±%
Conservative	Sir William Thomas Lewis	454		
Liberal	Rev Richard Morgan	383		
Majority		71		
Conservative win (new seat)				

=== Kibbor ===
Kibbor 1889
Party	Candidate	Votes	%	±%
Conservative	Henry Lewis	589		
Liberal	Rev David Evans	284		
Majority		305		
Conservative win (new seat)				

=== Llandaff ===
Llandaff 1889
Party	Candidate	Votes	%	±%
Conservative	Robert Forrest JP	448		
Liberal	W. Evans	257		
Majority		191		
Conservative win (new seat)				

=== Llandeilo Talybont ===
Llandeilo Talybont 1889
Party	Candidate	Votes	%	±%
Liberal	Rees Harries	472		
Conservative	D. Lewis	97		
Majority		375		
Liberal win (new seat)				

=== Llansamlet ===
Llansamlet 1889
Party	Candidate	Votes	%	±%
Liberal	William Sims	556		
Independent	W.F. Richards	392		
Majority		164		
Liberal win (new seat)				

=== Llantrisant ===
Llantrisant 1889
Party	Candidate	Votes	%	±%
Liberal	J. Blandy Jenkins	609		
Conservative	Josiah Lewis	444		
Majority		165		
Liberal win (new seat)				

=== Llantwit Fardre ===
This large ward covered the parishes of Llantwit Fardre, Llanfabon and Llanwonno and witnessed a close contest. The Liberal candidate, Edward Edwards, addressing a public meeting at Graigberthlwyd Chapel, referred to personal attacks made against him by opponents and defended his record as a Guardian and member of the Gelligaer Highways Board. Dewi Mabon also addressed this meeting, and in response to questions, Edwards declared himself in favour of the Welsh language being taught more widely in schools. it was alleged that his opponent, Jabez Evans, though nominally an Independent, was supported by the Conservative Party. This is borne out to some extent by reports of Evans's meetings, where he was generally supported by those who argued that the "best men" should be elected, regardless of their politics.

Llantwit Fardre 1889
Party	Candidate	Votes	%	±%
Liberal	Edward Edwards	367		
Independent	Jabez Evans	314		
Majority		53		
Liberal win (new seat)				

=== Llwydcoed ===
Llwydcoed 1889
Party	Candidate	Votes	%	±%
Conservative	Rees Hopkin Rhys	317		
Liberal	Griffith George	258		
Majority		59		
Conservative win (new seat)				

=== Llwynypia and Trealaw (two seats) ===
Lewis and Williams, chosen as the official candidates of the Liberal Association, faced one of the few prominent coal owners in the Rhondda to stand as a Conservative candidate. Their campaign was supported by D.A. Thomas who addressed a public meeting at Clydach Vale. Thomas stated that he had known Hood longer than the two Liberals, but that the county elections should be fought on political lines.

Llwynypia and Trealaw 1889
Party	Candidate	Votes	%	±%
Liberal	Richard Lewis	769		
Liberal	William Williams	730		
Conservative	Archibald Hood	713		
Liberal win (new seat)				
Liberal win (new seat)				

=== Loughor and Penderry ===
Lougher and Penderry 1889
Party	Candidate	Votes	%	±%
Conservative	J. T. D. Llewellyn	647		
Liberal	W. Harries	312		
Majority		336		
Conservative win (new seat)				

=== Maesteg ===
Maesteg 1889
Party	Candidate	Votes	%	±%
Liberal	Dr John Davies	662		
Independent	D. Grey	509		
Majority		153		
Liberal win (new seat)				

=== Margam ===
Margam 1889
Party	Candidate	Votes	%	±%
Liberal	Arthur Pendarves Vivian	618		
Liberal	Llewellyn Howell	377		
Majority		241		
Liberal win (new seat)				

=== Merthyr Town ===
Following a close three-way contest, John Jenkins, a member of the Local Board of Health for twelve years, scored a narrow victory. Jenkins was the proprietor of the Thomastown Brickworks and a prominent figure in the Merthyr Building Society. Jenkins was said to have campaigned as a Radical, while the other two candidates relied upon their 'personal qualifications'. A few months later, however, Jenkins was killed in an accident.

Merthyr Town 1889
Party	Candidate	Votes	%	±%
Liberal	John Jenkins	543		
Unionist	Frank James	510		
Conservative	D. Williams	500		
Majority		33		
Liberal win (new seat)				

=== Merthyr Vale ===
Merthyr Vale 1889
Party	Candidate	Votes	%	±%
Liberal	Walter Bell	Unopposed		
Liberal win (new seat)				

=== Morriston ===
David Davis, a tinplate manufacturer, was returned unopposed. The widespread support he attracted was indicated by a meeting at Morriston, chaired by William Williams, Maesygwernen, 'who was supported by nearly all the tinplate manufacturers of the neighbourhood and the leading inhabitants of the district'.

Morriston 1889
Party	Candidate	Votes	%	±%
Liberal	David Davies	unopposed		
Liberal win (new seat)				

=== Neath (two seats) ===
Neath 1889
Party	Candidate	Votes	%	±%
Unionist	Charles Evan Thomas	920		
Independent	Henry Pendrill Charles	738		
Liberal	Thomas Powell	687		
Unionist win (new seat)				
Independent win (new seat)				

=== Newcastle ===
Newcastle 1889
Party	Candidate	Votes	%	±%
Liberal	James Bryant	477		
Conservative	F.J. Coldridge Bowles	275		
Majority		202		
Liberal win (new seat)				

=== Ogmore ===
Ogmore 1889
Party	Candidate	Votes	%	±%
Liberal	Evan Evans	362		
Independent	Rees Thomas	243		
Conservative	William Howells	183		
Majority		143		
Liberal win (new seat)				

=== Ogmore Valley ===
Ogmore Valley 1889
Party	Candidate	Votes	%	±%
Liberal	John Williams	509		
Conservative	Daniel Price	366		
Majority		143		
Liberal win (new seat)				

=== Oystermouth ===
Oystermouth 1889
Party	Candidate	Votes	%	±%
Conservative	Thomas Penrice	284		
Conservative	Nicholl Morgan	244		
Liberal	John Taylor	135		
Conservative win (new seat)				

=== Penarth (two members) ===
Penarth 1889
Party	Candidate	Votes	%	±%
Conservative	Henry Oakden Fisher	667		
Conservative	John Stuart Corbett	427		
Liberal	Thomas Lewis	423		
Liberal	D.T. Alexander	387		
Conservative win (new seat)				
Conservative win (new seat)				

=== Penrhiwceiber and Dyffryn (two seats) ===
Penrhiwceiber and Dyffryn 1889
Party	Candidate	Votes	%	±%
Liberal	Col. C.J.N. Gray	1,027		
Liberal	Gwilym Jones	694		
Liberal	Hon. H. Campbell Bruce	664		
Liberal win (new seat)				
Liberal win (new seat)				

=== Pentre and Ystrad (two seats) ===
David Evans, manager of David Davis & Sons' pit at Bodringallt, and former chairman of the Ystradyfodwg School Board was the only official Rhondda Labour and Liberal Association candidate to be defeated. The successful candidate was William Jenkins of Ystradefechan.

Pentre and Ystrad 1889
Party	Candidate	Votes	%	±%
Liberal	William Jenkins	1,116		
Liberal	Richard Morris	1,093		
Liberal	David Evans	796		
Majority				
Liberal win (new seat)				
Liberal win (new seat)				

=== Penydarren ===
Penydarren 1889
Party	Candidate	Votes	%	±%
Liberal	Thomas Williams	653		
Conservative	John Plews	323		
Majority		330		
Liberal win (new seat)				

=== Plymouth ===
Plymouth 1889
Party	Candidate	Votes	%	±%
Liberal	Henry W. Lewis	570		
Liberal	Joseph Owen	311		
Majority		239		
Liberal win (new seat)				

=== Pontardawe ===
Pontardawe 1889
Party	Candidate	Votes	%	±%
Liberal	Ernest Hall Hedley	511		
Liberal	John Beynon	291		
Majority		220		
Liberal win (new seat)				

=== Pontlottyn ===
Pontlottyn 1889
Party	Candidate	Votes	%	±%
Liberal	Rev Aaron Davies	469		
Conservative	J. Matthews	342		
Majority		127		
Liberal win (new seat)				

=== Pontypridd ===
This contrast attracted considerable interest as a prominent Liberal faced a major employer in Pontypridd and owner of the Brown Lenox chain works.

Pontypridd 1889
Party	Candidate	Votes	%	±%
Liberal	Walter Morgan	608		
Conservative	Gordon Lenox JP	490		
Majority		118		
Liberal win (new seat)				

=== Porth ===
Porth 1889
Party	Candidate	Votes	%	±%
Liberal	John Jones Griffiths	413		
Liberal	Idris Williams	303		
Liberal	Thomas Jones	243		
Majority		110		
Liberal win (new seat)				

=== Resolven ===
Resolven 1889
Party	Candidate	Votes	%	±%
Liberal	Edward Plummer	772		
	Rev W. Griffiths	359		
Majority		413		
Liberal win (new seat)				

=== Sketty ===
John Powell's candidature was supported by key Liberal figures in the county, including Sir Hussey Vivian and Mabon, both of whom addressed meetings. Powell claimed the support of both the Liberal Association and the Labour Party.

Sketty 1889
Party	Candidate	Votes	%	±%
Liberal	John Powell	597		
Conservative	Philip Richards	458		
Liberal	E. Daniel	256		
Majority		139		
Liberal win (new seat)				

=== Swansea Valley ===
Swansea Valley 1889
Party	Candidate	Votes	%	±%
Liberal	Thomas Jones	505		
Independent	W. Jenkins	308		
Majority		197		
Liberal win (new seat)				

=== Tirdeunaw ===
Tirdeunaw 1889
Party	Candidate	Votes	%	±%
Liberal	Sir H. Hussey Vivian	786		
Liberal	Llewelyn Davies	369		
Majority		417		
Liberal win (new seat)				

=== Treforest ===
Treforest 1889
Party	Candidate	Votes	%	±%
Liberal	James Roberts	481		
Conservative	David Leyshon	383		
Majority		98		
Liberal win (new seat)				

=== Treorchy and Treherbert (two seats) ===
The relative unity of the valley Liberals in these elections is illustrated by a meeting held at the Treorchy Board Schools to support the candidatures of William Morgan and J.S. Edwards at Treherbert and Treorchy respectively. The meeting was chaired by William Morris, minister of Noddfa, Treorchy and addressed by both Daronwy Isaac and Mabon himself. At the 1885 election Morgan had supported F.L. Davis while Edwards had supported Mabon.

Treorchy and Treherbert 1889
Party	Candidate	Votes	%	±%
Liberal	William Morgan	1,061		
Liberal	Rev John Salisbury Edwards	912		
Independent	Evan Evans	619		
Liberal win (new seat)				
Liberal win (new seat)				

=== Tylorstown and Ynyshir ===
Tylorstown and Ynyshir 1889
Party	Candidate	Votes	%	±%
Liberal	William Henry Mathias	Unopposed	N/A	N/A
Liberal win (new seat)				

=== Ystalyfera ===
At Ystalyfera there were two strong competing factions for the Liberal candidacy, each supporting John Beynon and James Williams respectively. After a lively arbitration meeting at Swansea, where three referees including David Randell MP and Thomas Phillips of Llanelli presided, Beynon was selected. However, a meeting of Williams's supporters resolved to ignore the decision and contest the seat. These divisions may have contributed to the Conservative victory.

Ystalyfera 1889
Party	Candidate	Votes	%	±%
Conservative	Dr David Thomas	375		
Liberal	James Williams	239		
Majority		136		
Conservative win (new seat)				

== Election of aldermen ==
In addition to the 66 councillors the council consisted of 22 county aldermen. Aldermen were elected by the council, and served a six-year term. Following the election of the initial 22 aldermen, half of the aldermanic bench would be elected every three years following the triennial council election.

Prior to the elections there had been some discussion about the method of electing aldermen. At a meeting in Clydach Vale, D.A. Thomas had argued that although he believed the elections should be fought on political lines, men such as J. T. D. Llewellyn and Rees Hopkin Rhys should be selected as aldermen in order that the Council could benefit from their experience as magistrates. This had been contradicted by one of the two Liberal candidates for the ward who had declared that the aldermen should be elected from within the council. In the event both Llewelyn and Rhys were successful at the elections in any case.

After the initial elections, there were sixteen Aldermanic vacancies and the following Alderman were appointed by the newly elected council:

Elected for six years

- J. T. D. Llewellyn, Conservative (elected councillor at Lougher and Penderry)
- Thomas Williams, Liberal (elected councillor at Penydarren)
- Walter H. Morgan Liberal (elected councillor at Pontypridd)
- William Hunter, Liberal (elected councillor at Briton Ferry)
- Frederick L. Davis, Liberal (elected councillor at Ferndale)
- John Davies, Liberal (elected councillor at Maesteg )
- William Morgan (elected councillor at Treherbert)
- Dr H. Naunton Davies, Liberal (elected Councillor at Cymmer)
- John Jones Griffiths, Liberal (elected councillor at Porth)
- Gwilym James, (elected councillor at Gellifaelog)
- Sir William Thomas Lewis, Conservative (elected councillor at Hirwaun)

Elected for three years

- Gwilym Jones, Liberal (elected councillor at Penrhiwceiber and Dyffryn)
- John Cory, Liberal (elected councillor at Barry and Cadoxton)
- David Davies, Liberal (elected councillor at Morriston)
- David Lewis Liberal (elected councillor at Caerphilly)
- Rev Aaron Davies, Liberal (elected councillor at Pontlottyn)
- William Jenkins, Liberal (elected councillor at Pentre and Ystrad)
- Thomas Rees, Liberal (elected councillor at Cowbridge)
- Edward Plummer, Liberal (elected councillor at Resolven)
- Rees Harries, Liberal (elected councillor at Llandeilo Talybont)
- Thomas P. White, Liberal (elected councillor at Aberaman)
- Richard Jenkins, Liberal (elected councillor at Aberavon )

In contrast to the position in some Welsh counties such as Cardiganshire, where the Liberal majority voted en bloc for a slate of candidates, including a small number of Conservatives, the distribution of the votes in the ballot suggested that this was not the case in Glamorgan. The votes ranged from 58 for J.T.D. Llewellyn to 25 for Sir William Thomas Lewis, who was only four votes ahead of the next candidate, Lord Aberdare. The Liberal caucus did agree on a slate, and altered it when four members including Hussey Vivian and Cory Yeo, declined to be nominated. However, the Liberal group were not as disciplined in adhering to the list as in some rural counties, perhaps reflecting the ambiguity inherent in some councillors' political allegiances. Even so, the end result was that the Liberals had all but two of the aldermanic seats.

== By-elections ==
=== Aberaman by -election ===
A by-election was held following T.P. White's elevation to the aldermanic bench. The result of the first election was regarded with surprise in some quarters and one local newspaper predicted that E.M. Hann, defeated at the first contest would be successful in the by-election. However, Hann was again defeated by a different Liberal candidate, Thomas Davies.

Aberaman by-election 1889
Party	Candidate	Votes	%	±%
Liberal	Thomas Davies	675		
Conservative	Edmund Mills Hann	549		
Majority		126		
Liberal hold		Swing		

=== Aberavon by-election ===
Aberavon by-election 1889
Party	Candidate	Votes	%	±%
Conservative	John Morgan Smith	418		
Liberal	Evan Davies	347		
Majority		71		

=== Barry and Cadoxton by-election ===
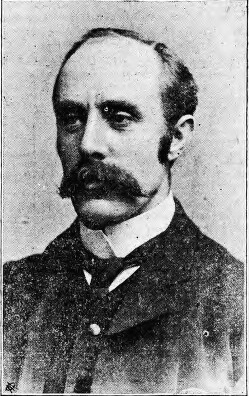
John Claxton Meggitt

Barry and Cadoxton by-election 1889
Party	Candidate	Votes	%	±%
Liberal	John Claxton Meggitt	263		
Conservative	General Lee	139		
Liberal hold		Swing		

=== Briton Ferry by-election ===
Briton Ferry by-election 1889
Party	Candidate	Votes	%	±%
Conservative	William Peddie Struve	365		
Liberal	Jenkin Hill	337		
Majority		28		

=== Caerphilly by-election ===
Caerphilly by-election 1889
Party	Candidate	Votes	%	±%
Liberal	Henry Anthony	600		
Liberal	D. Morgan	320		
Majority		280		
Liberal hold		Swing		

=== Cowbridge by-election ===
Cowbridge by-election 1889
Party	Candidate	Votes	%	±%
Conservative	John Samuel Gibbon	460		
Liberal	Rees Thomas	420		
Majority		40		

=== Cymmer by-election ===
Following the election of Henry Naunton Davies as alderman, his brother scored a decisive victory at the by-election.

Cymmer by-election 1889
Party	Candidate	Votes	%	±%
Liberal	Dr Evan Naunton Davies	781		
Conservative	J. Davies	184		
Majority		597		
Liberal hold		Swing		

=== Ferndale by-election ===
Evans, rejected at Pentre and Ystrad at the initial election, was returned unopposed.

Ferndale by-election 1889
Party	Candidate	Votes	%	±%
Liberal	David Evans	Unopposed		
Liberal hold				

=== Gellifaelog by-election ===
Dowlais by-election 1889
Party	Candidate	Votes	%	±%
Liberal	David Jones	277		
Liberal	John Thomas	276		
Unionist	Richard.P. Rees	82		
Majority		1		
Liberal hold		Swing		

=== Hirwaun by-election ===
Morgan won the by-election, having been defeated at the initial contest by Sir William Thomas Lewis

Hirwaun by-election 1889
Party	Candidate	Votes	%	±%
Liberal	Rev Richard Morgan	480		
Independent	Dr Evan Jones	362		
Majority		114		

=== Llandeilo Talybont by-election ===
Following the election of Rees Harries as alderman, a public meeting was held under his chairmanship at which Thomas Freeman was selected to contest the seat. There were no other nominations. Freeman was a prominent figure in the public life of Swansea and a member of the Swansea Town Council, which became the Swansea County Borough Council in 1889.

Llandeilo Talybont by-election 1889
Party	Candidate	Votes	%	±%
Liberal	Thomas Freeman	Unopposed		
Liberal hold				

=== Loughor and Penderry by-election ===
Lougher and Penderry by-election 1889
Party	Candidate	Votes	%	±%
Liberal	Edward Rice Daniel	554		
Conservative	John Roper Wright	494		
Majority		60		

=== Maesteg by-election ===
Maesteg by-election 1889
Party	Candidate	Votes	%	±%
Liberal	James Barrow	719		
Liberal	Francis Richard Crawshay	347		
Majority		372		
Liberal hold		Swing		

=== Morriston by-election ===
Morriston 1889
Party	Candidate	Votes	%	±%
Liberal	William Williams	Unopposed		
Liberal hold				

=== Penrhiwceiber and Dyffryn by-election ===
Penrhiwceiber and Dyffryn by-election 1898
Party	Candidate	Votes	%	±%
Liberal	Dr W.P. Jones	1,168		
Liberal Unionist	W. Jones	286		
Liberal hold		Swing		

=== Pentre and Ystrad by-election ===
Following the election of William Jenkins as alderman, Aneurin Cule, a grocer from Pentre and David Thomas, checkweigher at Pentre Colliery were nominated but Cule withdrew allowing Thomas to be returned unopposed. Thomas thus became the first working man to be elected to Glamorgan County Council.

Pentre and Ystrad by-election 1889
Party	Candidate	Votes	%	±%
Lib-Lab	David Thomas	Unopposed		

=== Penydarren by-election ===
Penydarren by-election 1889
Party	Candidate	Votes	%	±%
Liberal	David Davies	Unopposed		
Liberal hold				

=== Pontlottyn by-election ===
Pontlottyn by-election 1898
Party	Candidate	Votes	%	±%
Liberal	Rev John Penry Williams	694		
Liberal	Thomas Jones	380		
Majority		314		
Liberal hold		Swing		

=== Pontypridd by-election ===
Pontypridd by-election 1889
Party	Candidate	Votes	%	±%
Liberal	Henry Hopkins	577		
Independent	David Leyshon	487		
Majority		190		
Liberal hold		Swing		

=== Porth by-election ===
Following the election of John Jones Griffiths as alderman, two Liberals, including Hugh Jones, Baptist minister at Penygraig, were defeated by an Independent candidate.

Porth by-election 1889
Party	Candidate	Votes	%	±%
Independent	Thomas Jones	347		
Liberal	Rev Hugh Jones	309		
Liberal	D.Powell	245		
Majority		38		

=== Resolven by-election ===
Resolven by-election 1889
Party	Candidate	Votes	%	±%
Conservative	J. Edwards Vaughan	630		
Liberal	Samuel T. Evans	556		
Majority		74		

=== Treorchy and Treherbert by-election ===
Following the election of William Morgan as alderman, Evan Davies, a Treherbert butcher and William Morris, minister of Noddfa, Treorchy were nominated but Morris withdrew allowing Davies to be returned unopposed.

Treorchy and Treherbert by-election 1889
Party	Candidate	Votes	%	±%
Liberal	Evan Davies	Unopposed		
Liberal hold				

== By-Elections 1889-1892 ==
=== Merthyr Town by-election 1889 ===
The by-election arose following the death of the Liberal councillor, John Jenkins, a few weeks after the election. Frank James, who had been defeated by 33 votes at the original election in which both a Conservative and Unionist opposed the Liberal candidate, now scored a decisive victory.

Merthyr Town by-election 1889
Party	Candidate	Votes	%	±%
Unionist	Frank James	1,033		
Liberal	Joseph Williams	451		
Majority		582		

=== Ferndale by-election 1890 ===
A by-election took place at Ferndale on 1 January 1890 following the death of David Evans, Bodringallt. The elected candidate was the nominee of the Rhondda Labour and Liberal Association.

Ferndale 1890
Party	Candidate	Votes	%	±%
Liberal	Morgan Thomas	466		
	William Thomas	374		
Majority		92		

== Bibliography ==
- Parry, Jon (1989). "Labour Leaders and Local Politics 1888-1902: The Example of Aberdare". Welsh History Review. 14 (3): 399–416.
- Williams, Chris (1996). Democratic Rhondda: Politics and society 1885-1951. Cardiff: University of Wales Press.
