= 1898 Glamorgan County Council election =

1898 Welsh local government election

The Glamorgan County Council election, 1898 was the fourth contest for seats on this authority. It was preceded by the 1895 election and followed by the 1901 election. Glamorgan was by far the largest county in Wales in terms of population. Glamorgan County Council had been established by the Local Government Act 1888, and the first elections held in early 1889. The county of Glamorgan was at this time becoming heavily industrialised, although some areas such as the Vale of Glamorgan remained essentially rural. The rise of nonconformist liberalism, especially since the 1860s, throughout Wales, had challenged the prevailing influence of the landed gentry. However, even in 1889, the traditional forces remained influential and no working men were elected to the Council. This changed in 1892 with the unopposed return of David Morgan in Aberdare and the success of Isaac Evans in Resolven.

== Overview of the result ==
As in most parts of Wales, the Liberal Party was once again triumphant and won a majority of the seats. In 1895 there were more unopposed results than in previous elections and the Conservatives made some headway, reflecting the position in the United Kingdom as a whole where the party took power that year.

Results are drawn from a number of sources. The include an account of unopposed returns in the Evening Express, and results from the same newspaper as well as the Cambrian and Pontypridd Chronicle.

== Boundary changes ==
There were no boundary changes at this election.

== Retiring aldermen ==
All eleven retiring aldermen were Liberals. Gwilym Jones, W.H. Mathias, J.C. Meggitt, Herbert Evans and the Rev Aaron Davies all sought re-election. Jones and Mathias were returned unopposed while Meggitt's only opponent withdrew before polling day. Herbert Evans was opposed by the sitting Liberal councillor whom he eventually narrowly defeated (see Cwmavon, below). Aaron Davies was defeated at Pontlottyn. At Aberdare, David Price Davies was also nominated but withdrew rather than face a contest with the sitting councillor.

== Results by ward ==
=== Aberaman ===
Aberaman
Party	Candidate	Votes	%	±%
Liberal	Thomas Davies	481		
Independent	Thomas Rees	375		
Majority		106		
Liberal hold		Swing		

=== Aberavon ===
Aberavon 1898
Party	Candidate	Votes	%	±%
Conservative	John Morgan Smith*	unopposed		

=== Aberdare Town ===
Prior to the election it became apparent that Evans, the sitting councillor and the retiring alderman, David Price Davies, both coveted the seat. Davies however withdrew before the poll.

Aberdare Town 1898
Party	Candidate	Votes	%	±%
Liberal	John William Evans*	unopposed		
Liberal hold		Swing		

=== Barry ===
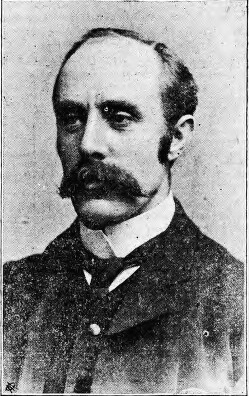
John Claxton Meggitt

The sitting councillor, John Cory, had withdrawn in favour of retiring alderman John Claxton Meggitt. The defeated candidate withdrew before polling day.

Barry 1898
Party	Candidate	Votes	%	±%
Liberal	John Claxton Meggitt**	507		
	W. Thomas	56		
Liberal hold		Swing		

=== Blaengwawr ===
Blaengwawr 1898
Party	Candidate	Votes	%	±%
Liberal	John Howell*	Unopposed		
Liberal hold		Swing		

=== Cadoxton ===
Cadoxton 1898
Party	Candidate	Votes	%	±%
Liberal	Dr P.J. O' Donnell	514		
Conservative	Dr E. Treharne*	367		
Majority		147		
Liberal gain from Conservative		Swing		

=== Bridgend ===
Bridgend 1898
Party	Candidate	Votes	%	±%
Independent	John Morgan Randall	Unopposed		
Independent gain from Liberal		Swing		

=== Briton Ferry ===
Jenkin Hill recaptured the seat he lost three years previously.

Briton Ferry 1898
Party	Candidate	Votes	%	±%
Liberal	Jenkin Hill	506		
Conservative	Dr E. Valentine Pegge*	315		
Majority		191		
Liberal gain from Conservative		Swing		

=== Caeharris ===
Caeharris 1898
Party	Candidate	Votes	%	±%
Unionist	Edward Pritchard Martin	unopposed		

=== Caerphilly ===
A narrow victory.

Caerphilly 1898
Party	Candidate	Votes	%	±%
Conservative	H.E. Morgan Lindsay*	846		
Liberal	Edward Edwards	843		
Majority		3		
Conservative gain from Liberal		Swing		

=== Cilfynydd ===
W.R. Davies took the place of Henry Lewis, who did not seek re-election after one term. Davies was chosen as a candidate after a public meeting of local Liberals where both candidates agreed to abide by the vote.

Cilfynydd 1898
Party	Candidate	Votes	%	±%
Liberal	William Roberts Davies	Unopposed		
Liberal win (new seat)				

=== Coedffranc ===
Coedffranc 1898
Party	Candidate	Votes	%	±%
Conservative	J. Newell Moore*	unopposed		
Conservative hold		Swing		

=== Coity ===
Coity 1898
Party	Candidate	Votes	%	±%
Liberal	William Howell*	Unopposed		
Liberal hold				

=== Cowbridge ===
Cowbridge
Party	Candidate	Votes	%	±%
Conservative	R.T. Bassett	unopposed		
Conservative hold		Swing		

=== Cwmavon ===
Two Liberals, a sitting alderman and sitting councillor, opposed each other.

Cwmavon 1898
Party	Candidate	Votes	%	±%
Liberal	Herbert Evans**	471		
Liberal	Llewellyn Griffiths*	451		
Majority		20		
Liberal hold		Swing		

=== Cyfarthfa ===
Thomas Thomas recaptured the seat he lost three years previously.

Cyfarthfa 1898
Party	Candidate	Votes	%	±%
Lib-Lab	Thomas Thomas	515		
Liberal	Thomas Davies	266		
Majority				
Lib-Lab gain from Liberal		Swing		

=== Cymmer ===
Cymmer 1898
Party	Candidate	Votes	%	±%
Liberal	Morgan Williams*	Unopposed		
Liberal hold				

=== Dinas Powys ===
Dinas Powys 1898
Party	Candidate	Votes	%	±%
Conservative	Oliver Henry Jones*	Unopposed		
Conservative hold				

=== Dowlais ===
Dowlais
Party	Candidate	Votes	%	±%
Conservative	Thomas Jenkins*	unopposed		
Conservative hold		Swing		

=== Dulais Valley ===
Dulais Valley
Party	Candidate	Votes	%	±%
Conservative	Evan Evans Bevan*	unopposed		
Conservative hold		Swing		

=== Ferndale ===
David Thomas JP, who had ousted fellow Liberal Morgan Williams in 1895, did not seek re-election due to ill-health leading to a contrast between the Rev Silas Charles, Congregational Minister and Thomas Samuel, grocer.

Ferndale 1898
Party	Candidate	Votes	%	±%
Liberal	Rev Silas Charles	778		
Liberal	Thomas Samuel	629		

=== Gadlys ===
Gadlys 1898
Party	Candidate	Votes	%	±%
Liberal	Charles Kenshole	unopposed		
Liberal hold		Swing		

=== Garw Valley ===
Garw Valley
Party	Candidate	Votes	%	±%
Liberal	John Thomas*	unopposed		

=== Gellifaelog ===
Gellifaelog
Party	Candidate	Votes	%	±%
Liberal	Evan Lewis*	unopposed		

=== Gelligaer ===
Gelligaer
Party	Candidate	Votes	%	±%
Independent	Henry William Martin	unopposed		

=== Gower ===
Gower 1898
Party	Candidate	Votes	%	±%
	George E. Gordon	314		
	John Holland	192		
	Richard Hopkin James	129		

=== Kibbor ===
Kibbor
Party	Candidate	Votes	%	±%
Conservative	Henry Lewis*	unopposed		

=== Llandaff ===
Llandaff
Party	Candidate	Votes	%	±%
Conservative	Robert Forrest*	unopposed		

=== Llandeilo Talybont ===
Llandeilo Talybont 1898
Party	Candidate	Votes	%	±%
Liberal	Rees Harries*	Unopposed		
Liberal hold		Swing		

=== Llansamlet ===
Llansamlet 1898
Party	Candidate	Votes	%	±%
Conservative	John Jordan	Unopposed		
Conservative hold		Swing		

=== Llantrisant ===
Llantrisant
Party	Candidate	Votes	%	±%
Liberal	J. Blandy Jenkins*	unopposed		

=== Llwydcoed ===
Llwydcoed 1898
Party	Candidate	Votes	%	±%
Unionist	Rees Hopkin Rhys	unopposed		

=== Llwynypia and Clydach ===
Llwynypia and Clydach
Party	Candidate	Votes	%	±%
Liberal	Richard Lewis	unopposed		

=== Gowerton and Penderry ===
Gowerton and Penderry 1898
Party	Candidate	Votes	%	±%
Liberal	Samuel Thomas*	Unopposed		
Liberal hold		Swing		

=== Maesteg ===
The same two candidates had faced each other in 1895. On that occasion, Barrow had won and was elected as alderman for a three-year period. Jenkin Jones was then returned at a by-election.

Maesteg
Party	Candidate	Votes	%	±%
Liberal	Jenkin Jones*	972		
Liberal	James Barrow**	842		

=== Margam ===
Margam 1898
Party	Candidate	Votes	%	±%
Unionist	Edward Knox	unopposed		

=== Merthyr Town ===
Merthyr Town
Party	Candidate	Votes	%	±%
Conservative	J.W. Lewis	706		
Liberal	Alfred Edwards	597		

=== Merthyr Vale ===
Merthyr Vale
Party	Candidate	Votes	%	±%
Liberal	David Prosser	538		
Liberal	Walter Bell	523		
Majority		15		

=== Morriston ===
Morriston
Party	Candidate	Votes	%	±%
Liberal	William Williams	unopposed		
Liberal hold		Swing		

=== Mountain Ash ===
Mountain Ash
Party	Candidate	Votes	%	±%
Liberal	Thomas Morris	549		
Liberal	Samuel Evans	459		
Liberal	John Lewis	316		
Majority		90		
Liberal hold		Swing		

=== Neath (North) ===
Neath (North) 1898
Party	Candidate	Votes	%	±%
Unionist	Hopkin Morgan	unopposed		
Unionist hold		Swing		

=== Neath (South) ===
At the previous election, Trick had stood as a Conservative.

Neath (South) 1898
Party	Candidate	Votes	%	±%
Independent	W.B. Trick	Unopposed	N/A	N/A
Independent gain from Liberal				

=== Newcastle ===
Newcastle 1898
Party	Candidate	Votes	%	±%
Liberal	Thomas J. Hughes*	Unopposed		
Liberal hold		Swing		

=== Ogmore ===
Ogmore 1898
Party	Candidate	Votes	%	±%
Conservative	J.I.D. Nicholl*	Unopposed		
Conservative hold		Swing		

=== Ogmore Valley ===
Ogmore Valley 1898
Party	Candidate	Votes	%	±%
Liberal	William Llewellyn*	Unopposed		
Liberal hold		Swing		

=== Oystermouth ===
Oystermouth 1898
Party	Candidate	Votes	%	±%
Liberal Unionist	Sir John Jones Jenkins	Unopposed	N/A	N/A
Liberal Unionist hold				

=== Penarth North ===
Penarth North
Party	Candidate	Votes	%	±%
Liberal	W.B. Shepherd*	377		
	J.L. Norris	240		
Liberal hold		Swing		

=== Penarth South ===
Penarth South
Party	Candidate	Votes	%	±%
	Frederick Henry Jotham	unopposed		

=== Penrhiwceiber ===
Penrhiwceiber
Party	Candidate	Votes	%	±%
	Dr. R. W. Jones	unopposed		
	Liberal hold	Swing		

=== Pentre ===
Morris appears to have defected to the Unionists, leading to his defeat. This was considered to be the most significant contest in the valley but, owing to the support of colliery officials and leading tradesmen for the winning candidate, Elias Henry Davies, it was clear that Morris and been defeated before the close of the poll. Davies was an active Congregationalist, freemason and president of the Rhondda Cymmrodorion.

Pentre 1898
Party	Candidate	Votes	%	±%
Liberal	E.H. Davies	643		
Unionist	Richard Morris*	457		
Majority				
Liberal hold		Swing		

=== Penydarren ===
Penydarren
Party	Candidate	Votes	%	±%
Liberal	David Davies*	516		
Conservative	T.E. Morgan	270		
Majority		146		

=== Pontardawe ===
Pontardawe 1898
Party	Candidate	Votes	%	±%
Conservative	Frank Gilbertson	500		
Liberal	Dr Griffiths	478		
Majority		22		

=== Plymouth ===
Plymouth 1898
Party	Candidate	Votes	%	±%
Liberal	Henry W. Lewis*	603		
Conservative	A. Daniel	440		

=== Pontlottyn ===
Although a Liberal gain, the shock was the defeat of Alderman Aaron Davies.

Pontlottyn 1898
Party	Candidate	Votes	%	±%
Liberal	Alfred Phillips	570		
Liberal	Rev Aaron Davies**	355		
Liberal gain from Conservative		Swing		

=== Pontypridd ===
Pontypridd 1898
Party	Candidate	Votes	%	±%
Liberal	Hopkin Smith Davies*	692		
Independent	Dr Hamlen Williams	605		

=== Porth and Penygraig ===
Porth and Penygraig
Party	Candidate	Votes	%	±%
Liberal	J. Jones Griffiths**	779		
Conservative	J.W. Jones	424		
Majority		555		
Liberal hold		Swing		

=== Resolven ===
Resolven 1898
Party	Candidate	Votes	%	±%
Liberal	Daniel Evans	unopposed		
Liberal hold		Swing		

=== Sketty ===
A repeat of the contest in 1895, with the same result.

Sketty 1898
Party	Candidate	Votes	%	±%
Conservative	Sir Robert Armine Morris*	498		
Liberal	Rev John Davies	405		
Liberal hold		Swing		

=== Swansea Valley ===
Boundary Change

Swansea Valley 1898
Party	Candidate	Votes	%	±%
Liberal	Llewellyn Davies	Unopposed	N/A	N/A
Liberal hold				

=== Treforest ===
James Roberts had won the seat at a by-election following the death of the previous member, David Leyshon. His defeat was greeted with surprise by a crowd said to number 4,000 who had gathered to hear the result. Roberts said he was glad to think that he had been the means of overthrowing a member of a 'Pontypridd clique'.

Treforest 1898
Party	Candidate	Votes	%	±%
Independent	Samuel Evans	671		
Liberal	James Roberts*	614		
Majority		57		

=== Treherbert ===
Treherbert 1898
Party	Candidate	Votes	%	±%
Liberal	William Morgan**	Unopposed	N/A	N/A
Liberal hold				

=== Treorchy ===
Treorchy 1898
Party	Candidate	Votes	%	±%
Lib-Lab	Daronwy Isaac*	Unopposed	N/A	N/A
Lib-Lab hold				

=== Trealaw and Tonypandy ===
Tonypandy 1898
Party	Candidate	Votes	%	±%
Liberal	D.W. Davies	570		
Liberal	William Lawrence	398		
Majority		172		
Liberal hold		Swing		

=== Tylorstown and Ynyshir ===
Tylorstown and Ynyshir 1898
Party	Candidate	Votes	%	±%
Liberal	W.H. Mathias**	Unopposed		
Liberal hold		Swing		

=== Ystalyfera ===
Ystalyfera 1898
Party	Candidate	Votes	%	±%
Conservative	Dr David Thomas*	unopposed		
Conservative hold		Swing		

=== Ystrad ===
Ystrad
Party	Candidate	Votes	%	±%
Liberal	Clifford J. Cory*	804		
	J.B. Price	133		
Majority		671		
Liberal hold		Swing		

== Election of aldermen ==
In addition to the 66 councillors the council consisted of 22 county aldermen. Aldermen were elected by the council, and served a six-year term. Following the 1898 election, there were twelve Aldermanic vacancies. These comprised the eleven vacancies due to retiring alderman with the twelfth being vacant following the death of Isaac Evans.

The following aldermen were appointed by the newly elected council.

elected for six years

- Gwilym Jones, Liberal, retiring alderman (elected councillor at Mountain Ash)
- W.H. Mathias, Liberal, retiring alderman (elected councillor at Tylorstown and Ynyshir)
- J.C. Meggitt, Liberal, retiring alderman (elected councillor at Barry)
- Llewellyn Davies, Liberal (elected councillor at Swansea Valley)
- T.J. Hughes, Liberal (elected councillor at Newcastle)
- William Llewellyn, Liberal (elected councillor at Ogmore Valley)
- J.W. Evans, Liberal (elected councillor at Aberdare Town)
- William Howell, Liberal (elected councillor at Coity)
- Rees Harris, Liberal (elected councillor at Llandeilo Talybont)
- David Prosser, Liberal (elected councillor at Merthyr Vale)
- Dr R.W. Jones, Liberal (elected councillor at Penrhiwceber)

elected for three years

- Daniel Evans, Liberal (elected councillor at Resolven)

All eleven aldermen were Liberals, as were the retiring aldermen.

== By-elections ==
=== Aberdare Town by-election ===
Following the return of J.W. Evans, David Price Davies and Thomas Thomas (councillor for the ward from 1892 until 1895) were nominated. However, Thomas withdrew allowing Davies to be returned unopposed.

Aberdare Town by-election 1898
Party	Candidate	Votes	%	±%
Liberal	David Price Davies*	unopposed		
Liberal hold		Swing		

=== Barry by-election ===
John Cory had been a member of the county council since its formation, and served as alderman from 1889 until 1892. Captain Murrell, in returning thanks for his election, said he came forward as an independent candidate as a protest against the introduction of the foreign element into the representation of the district.

Barry by-election 1898
Party	Candidate	Votes	%	±%
Unionist	Captain Hamilton Murrell	595		
Liberal	John Cory*	568		
Unionist gain from Liberal		Swing		

=== Coity by-election ===
Coity by-election 1898
Party	Candidate	Votes	%	±%
Liberal	William Howell*	unopposed		
Liberal hold		Swing		

=== Llandeilo Talybont by-election ===
Llandeilo Talybont by-election 1898
Party	Candidate	Votes	%	±%
Liberal	Rees Harries*	unopposed		

=== Merthyr Vale by-election ===
Merthyr Vale by-election 1898
Party	Candidate	Votes	%	±%
Liberal	David Prosser	538		
Liberal	Walter Bell	523		
Majority		153		

=== Mountain Ash by-election ===
Mountain Ash by-election 1898
Party	Candidate	Votes	%	±%
Liberal	Thomas Morris	549		
Liberal	Samuel Evans	459		
Liberal	John Lewis	316		
Majority		90		
Liberal hold		Swing		

=== Newcastle by-election ===
Newcastle by-election 1898
Party	Candidate	Votes	%	±%
Liberal	Thomas J. Hughes	unopposed		
Liberal hold		Swing		

=== Ogmore Valley by-election ===
Ogmore Valley by-election 1898
Party	Candidate	Votes	%	±%
Liberal	William Llewellyn*	unopposed		
Liberal hold		Swing		

=== Penrhiwceiber by-election ===
Following the election of Dr R.W. Jones as an alderman, Thomas Morris, who had represented Mountain Ash on the previous council, was elected. Morris was opposed by another Liberal candidate, clerk to the Llanwonno School Board, who stood in opposition to Morris's links to the beer trade. John Williams, checkweigher at a local colliery and a future Labour MP was a possible candidate but withdrew at an early stage.

Penrhiwceiber by-election 1898
Party	Candidate	Votes	%	±%
Liberal	Thomas Morris*	582		
Liberal	S. Shipton	484		
Conservative	W.N. Matthews	322		
Liberal hold		Swing		

=== Resolven by-election ===
Resolven by-election 1898
Party	Candidate	Votes	%	±%
Liberal	Daniel Evans	unopposed		
Liberal hold		Swing		

=== Swansea Valley by-election ===
Swansea Valley by-election 1898
Party	Candidate	Votes	%	±%
Liberal	Llewellyn Davies	unopposed		
Liberal hold		Swing		

=== Tylorstown and Ynyshir by-election ===
Tylorstown and Ynyshir by-election 1898
Party	Candidate	Votes	%	±%
Liberal	W.H. Mathias**	unopposed		
Liberal hold		Swing		

== By-elections 1898-1901 ==
=== Dowlais by-election ===
A by-election was held in Dowlais ward in October 1899 following the elevation of Thomas Jenkins to the aldermanic bench. John Davies, the local miners' agent defeated an Independent candidate, a local chemist.

Dowlais by-election 1899
Party	Candidate	Votes	%	±%
Lib-Lab	John Davies	311		
Independent	R.P. Rees	295		
Majority		16		
Lib-Lab gain from Conservative		Swing		

== Bibliography ==
- Parry, Jon (1989). "Labour Leaders and Local Politics 1888-1902: The Example of Aberdare". Welsh History Review. 14 (3): 399–416.
- Williams, Chris (1996). Democratic Rhondda: Politics and society 1885-1951. Cardiff: University of Wales Press.
