= William Morris (Baptist minister) =

Welsh minister and politician

William Morris (12 September 1843 – 21 December 1922), widely known by his bardic name, Rhosynnog, was the minister of Noddfa Baptist Church, Treorchy, South Wales from soon after its formation in 1868 until his death.

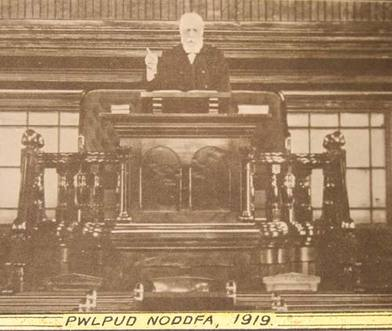
Rev. William Morris, Treorchy

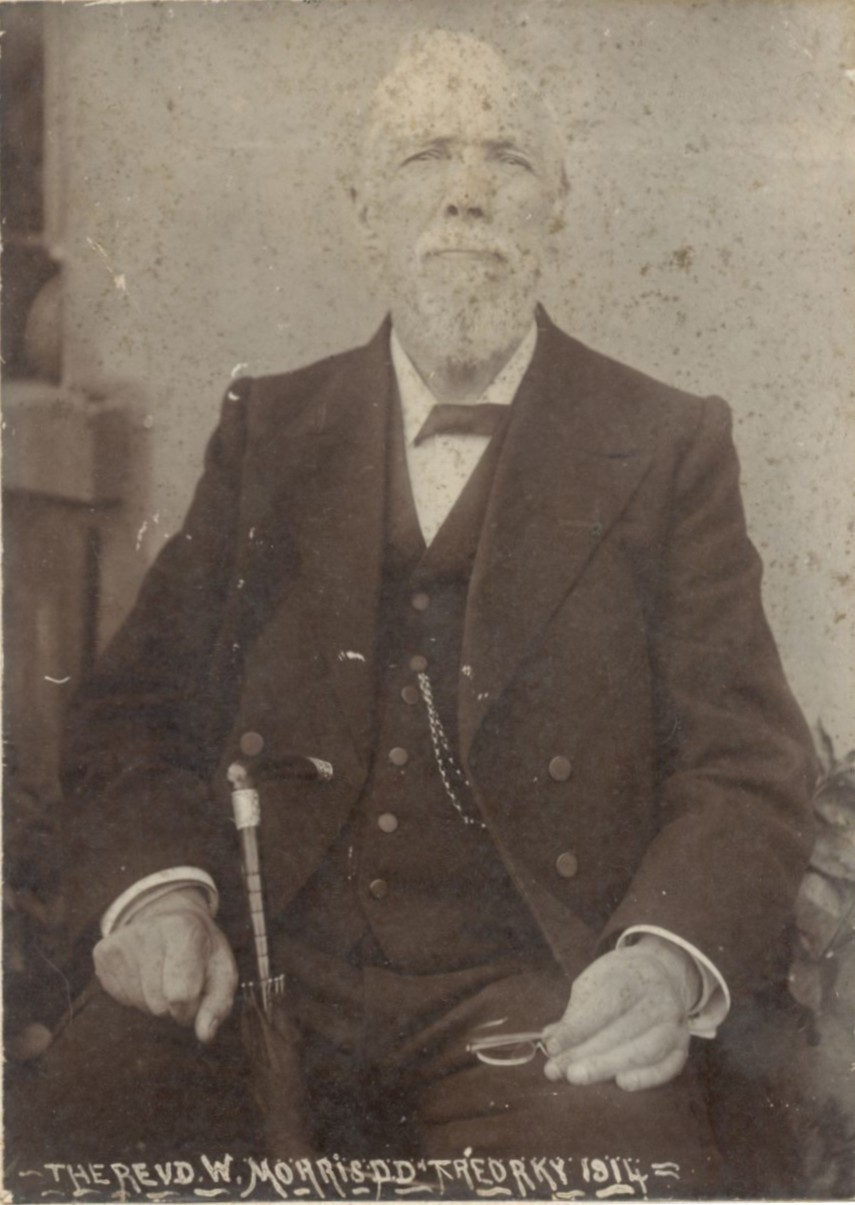

Morris was born on 12 September 1843 at Treboeth, Swansea, the son of David Morris. After training in early life to become an engineer, he turned his attention to the nonconformist ministry. He was educated at the Swansea Academy of G. P. Evans, and later at Pontypool.

Ordained at Treorchy in 1868, he later became secretary of the Baptist Union of Wales from 1879 until 1898, and later became its president. Under his leadership the membership at Noddfa increased rapidly and branch chapels were established including Ainon, Treorchy and Bethel, Cwmpark.

A popular lecturer, Morris also supported cultural, temperance, and educational movements in the Rhondda Valley. He was made a Fellow of the Royal Geographical Society, and in 1902 he visited the United States of America and was awarded an honorary degree by Bucknell University.

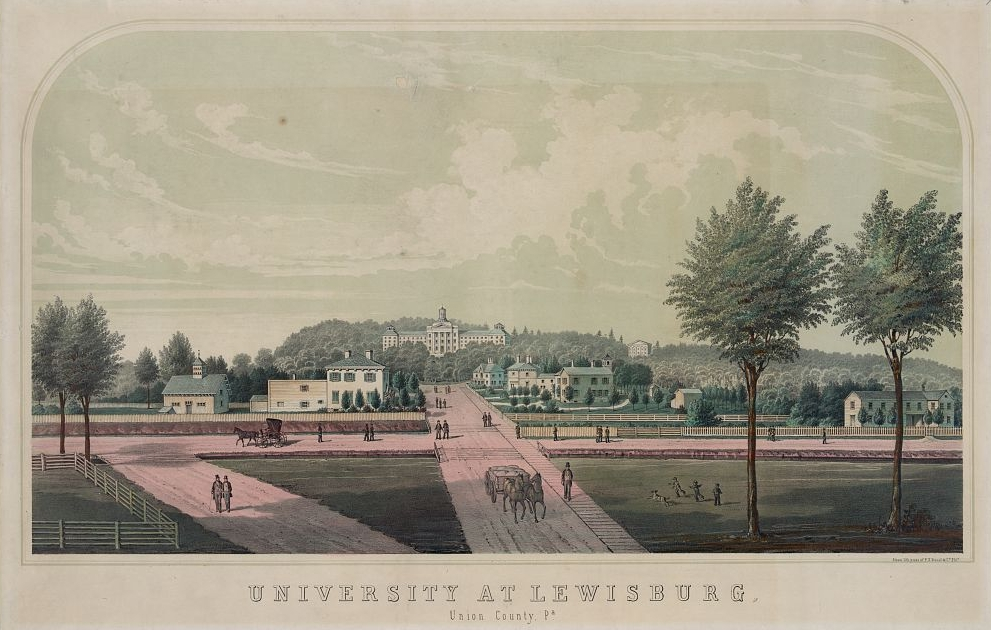
Bucknell University in the 1870s

== Politics ==
Morris served as a member of the Ystradyfodwg School Board.

He was also involved in local parliamentary politics. Following the formation of the new Rhondda constituency prior to the 1885 election, Morris was a leading figure in the local Liberal Association, known as the 'Three Hundred', who were tasked with selecting a parliamentary candidate. Morris supported the coal owner Frederick L. Davis against the trade unionist Mabon. In this respect, morris allied himself with the Liberal establishment in the valley, dominated by colliery officials and tradesmen, against the trade union movement. In some ways this reflected the influence of colliery officials at Noddfa.

By the 1889 elections to Glamorgan County Council the Liberal schism had been temporarily been set aside and Morris chaired a meeting at Treorchy to support the official Liberal candidates for Treorchy and Treherbert wards. At this meeting both Daronwy Isaac, a well-known miner, and Mabon himself spoke. Following the election of William Jenkins, Ystradfechan, as alderman, Morris, together with Evan Davies, a Treherbert butcher were nominated as candidates for the by-election but Morris withdrew allowing Davies to be returned unopposed. In 1892, Morris was adopted as the official Liberal candidate for Treorchy at the Glamorgan County Council election of 1892. He was defeated, however, by the Lib-Lab candidate, Daronwy Isaac, a prominent miners' leader and close ally of Mabon.

He died on 21 December 1922.
