= John Jones Griffiths =

John Jones Griffiths (1839–1901) was an educationalist, Liberal politician and prominent figure in the public life of the Rhondda, Wales.

== Early life and career ==
Griffiths was born in Aberystwyth and received his early education at Penparcau National School. Although apprenticed as a bookbinder and ironmonger in his native town, he soon moved to Blaina. Monmouthshire, where he became a pupil teacher. After five years he earned a scholarship to Bangor Normal College where he was one of the first students and a contemporary of John Rhys. Having qualified as a teacher, he first taught at Hirwaun and later at Beaufort, and during his time there he won several prizes at eisteddfodau. In 1866 he left Beaufort for Aberaman and during his time there became involved in Liberal politics and campaigned for Henry Richard at the 1868 General Election.

== Griffiths at Penygraig ==
In 1872 Griffiths left Aberaman for Penygraig where he succeeded Tom John as headmaster of the National Schools. During his time at Penygraig a number of explosions took place at the Penygraig Naval collieries and Griffiths played prominent role in efforts to raise funds for widows and orphans. He retired from his post in 1885 and thereafter devoted himself to public life.

At the 1885 General Election he actively supported F.L. Davis in his unsuccessful campaign against William Abraham (Mabon). He was, however, unsuccessful in his attempt to secure election to the Ystradyfodwg School Board in 1890.

== Religion ==
In 1884 he was made a deacon at Pisgah Calvinistic Methodist Chapel, Penygraig. He may also be founder of many of the English Presbyterian churches in the Rhondda and often filled their pulpits on Sundays and was said to have a particular talent for adapting the gospel to attract the listeners. He was president o the Rhondda. Valley Free Church Council and instrumental in establishing the new cause at Trinity, Tonypandy. He was an active advocate of the temperance movement, often opposing licences for new public houses and secretary of the Rhondda Temperance League.

== Public life ==
When the Rhondda became a parliamentary constituency for the first time in 1885, Griffiths was the secretary of the official Rhondda Liberal Association which ran Frederick Lewis Davis as its candidate. At the inaugural Glamorgan County Council election in 1889 he was elected councillor for Porth and was immediately made an alderman. He was re-elected councillor for Porth and Penygraig, and again made an alderman, both in 1895 and 1901. He died at his home in Penygraig on 30 June 1901. His funeral was held at Llethr-ddu Cemetery on 11 July.

== Bibliography ==
- Williams, Chris (1996). Democratic Rhondda: politics and Society 1885-1951. Cardiff: University of Wales Press.
