= Aberavon (electoral ward) =

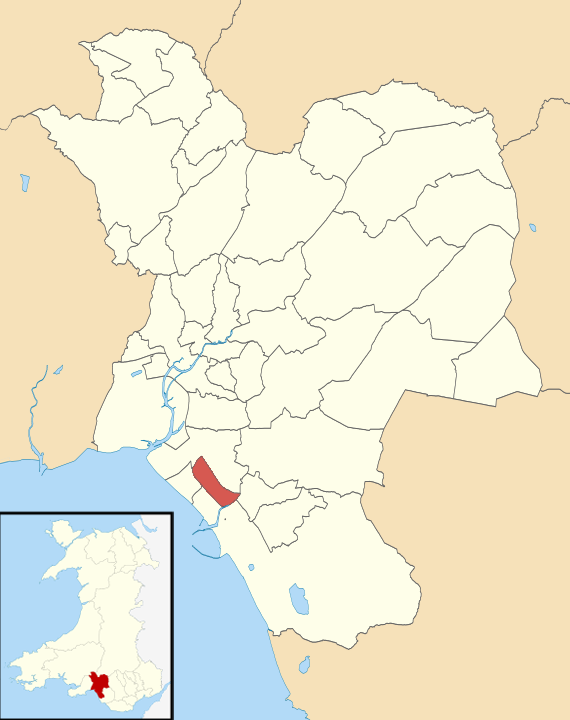
- Location of Aberavon ward within Neath Port Talbot County Borough
- Principal area: Neath Port Talbot
- Preserved county: West Glamorgan
- Country: Wales
- Sovereign state: United Kingdom
- UK Parliament: Aberafan Maesteg
- Senedd Cymru – Welsh Parliament: Aberavon
- Councillors: Scott Bamsey (Plaid Cymru); Stephanie Lynch (Labour); Nigel Hunt (Plaid Cymru)

The electoral ward of Aberavon electoral ward includes the communities of Baglan and Baglan Bay, in Neath Port Talbot county borough, Wales. Baglan is in the Senedd constituency of Aberavon and the UK constituency of Aberafan Maesteg.

== Overview ==
It is based upon the historic town of Aberavon. Aberavon Ward is bounded by the wards of Sandfields West and Sandfields East to the south-west; Baglan to the north; Port Talbot to the east and Margam to the south. The ward boundaries are defined by the roads surrounding it: the M4 Motorway to the north east; the A4241 to the north-west; Afan Way to the south-west and the River Afan to the south-east.

The Aberavon Ward can be roughly divided into two parts. There is the residential area to the southeastern part of the ward beside the River Afan. The north western area consists of areas of industrial estate land called the Baglan Industrial Park which includes a number of out of town retail premises as well as business and manufacturing premises.

Aberavon is currently a ward for the purposes of Neath Port Talbot County Borough Council elections. Since 1995 it has been represented by Labour, Social Democrat and Plaid Cymru councillors.

== County council elections ==
=== 2020 by-election ===
Sitting Labour councillor, Steffan ap Dafydd, died suddenly on 10 July 2020.

The by-election for his replacement took place on 6 May 2021, the turnout was 44.6% and the results were as follows:

| Candidate | Party | Votes | Status |
|---|---|---|---|
| Stephanie Lynch | Labour | 677 | Labour hold |
| Andrew Dacey | Plaid Cymru | 647 | |
| Liz Hill O'Shea | Conservative | 199 | |
| Diane Thomas | Independent | 144 | |
| Ceri Golding | Gwlad | 121 | |
| Julie Mills | Propel | 34 | |

=== 2017 ===
In the 2017 local council elections, the results were:

| Candidate | Party | Votes | Status |
|---|---|---|---|
| Scott Bamsey | Plaid Cymru | 543 | Plaid Cymru gain |
| Steffan ap Dafydd | Labour | 500 | Labour hold |
| Nigel Hunt | Plaid Cymru | 491 | Plaid Cymru gain |
| Diane Thomas | Plaid Cymru | 485 | |
| Colin Clement | Labour | 475 | |
| Keith Priddle | Labour | 442 | |
| Ceri Golding | Independent | 376 | |
| John Davies | Independent | 313 | |
| Mark Jones | Independent | 307 | |
| Marian Lewis | Independent | 265 | |
| Cen Phillips | Liberal Democrats | 260 | |

=== 2012 ===
In the 2012 local council elections, the electorate turnout for Aberavon was 35.84%. The results were:

| Candidate | Party | Votes | Status |
|---|---|---|---|
| Ceri Golding | Labour | 751 | Labour gain |
| Mark Jones | Labour | 740 | Labour gain |
| Anthony Taylor | Social Democratic Party | 702 | Social Democratic Party hold |
| Barbara Trahar | Labour | 613 | |
| John Sullivan | Social Democratic Party | 556 | |
| Jeff Dinham | Social Democratic Party | 550 | |
| Paul Nicholas-Jones | Plaid Cymru | 185 | |

Following the election all three elected councillors left their respective parties and sat as unaffiliated councillors. Jones and Golding were deselected as candidates prior to the following May 2017 election, and decided to stand as Independents.

== History 1889-1974 ==
Aberavon first became an electoral ward in the late nineteenth century with the formation of Glamorgan County Council.

=== Glamorgan County Council, 1889-1974 ===
In 1889, Richard Jenkins, a local tinplate manufacturer became the first Liberal member for Aberavon, defeating John Morgan Smith.

Aberavon 1889
| Party | Candidate | Votes | % | ±% |
|---|---|---|---|---|
| Liberal | Richard Jenkins | 401 | 53.5 | |
| Conservative | John Morgan Smith | 348 | 46.5 | |
| Majority | | 53 | 7.0 | |

Following Jenkins's elevation to the aldermanic bench, Smith won the seat.

Aberavon by-election 1889
| Party | Candidate | Votes | % | ±% |
|---|---|---|---|---|
| Conservative | John Morgan Smith | 418 | | |
| Liberal | Evan Davies | 347 | | |
| Majority | | 71 | | |

Smith held the seat at the elections of 1892, 1895, 1898, 1901, 1904 and 1907.

== Aberavon Borough Council ==
Aberavon was also an electoral ward of the Aberavon Borough Council which was reformed and extended in 1861. In 1921, the old borough was merged with Margam Urban District Council, formed in 1894 to create the Port Talbot Municipal Borough.
