= Noddfa Chapel, Treorchy =

Former chapel in Treorchy, Rhondda Cynon Taf, Wales

Coordinates: 51.6602°N 3.5066°W

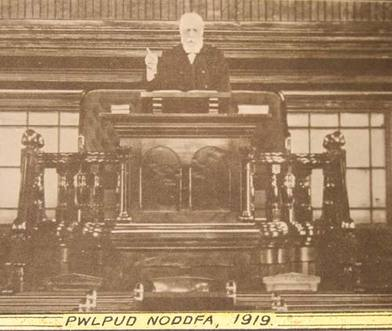
The first minister, William Morris, in the pulpit.

Noddfa or Noddfa Welsh Baptist Chapel (Welsh: Capel Bedyddwyr Cymraeg Noddfa), was located in Treorchy in the Rhondda Valley. It was one of the largest Baptist churches in the South Wales valleys, and one of the largest and grandest of all Welsh chapels.

== Foundation and description ==
A branch of Nebo, Ystrad Rhondda, it began when a vestry was established in September 1866. The chapel was built by David Morgan, and opened in 1868 when special preaching services were held. Those who participated included Thomas Price, Aberdare . This was during the initial phase of industrialisation in the Rhondda Valleys, and the chapel had to be extended as soon as 1876 due to the rapid growth in population.

Reportedly seating 1,000, it had an unusually ornate interior for a Welsh chapel, with a stained glass window of John the Baptist in the lobby, three aisles, an 'all-round' gallery, and a three-manual organ, and has been described as "the Rhondda Valley's cathedral of nonconformity".

Several branches of Noddfa were opened in the later decades of the nineteenth century, including Ainon, Treorchy and Bethel, Cwmparc. An English Baptist Church was also established at Treorchy.

In over a century, Noddfa had only four ministers, namely William Morris (1869–1922), Humphrey Ellis (1924–30), James Morris Lewis (1933–64) and Lewis Young Hayden (1966–78). Noddfa's last minister was a member of a prominent family of Welsh preachers who included Jubilee Young, minister of Seion, Llanelli for many years.

Membership at Noddfa peaked at 713 in 1905, in the immediate aftermath of the Welsh revival. In common with many other chapels in the industrial valleys of Wales the membership declined thereafter, but was still at 398 in 1945. Significantly, however, there was a drastic fall in the Sunday school numbers after the Second World War, from 198 in 1945 to 25 by 1965. This was a symptom of both the increasing secularisation of society and the relative decline of the Welsh language, especially amongst the young. By the 1960s the Sunday school had largely ceased to function. Membership, however, remained at 208 as recently as 1970.

== Music ==
Noddfa has an important role in the choral tradition of the Welsh valleys. The chapel had its own choir, conducted by John Hughes, and oratorios by Handel, Mendelssohn, Haydn, Beethoven and Mozart were performed on a regular basis, with three or four such productions each year. There was also a flourishing and successful children's choir. In later years the Treorchy Male Voice Choir used the chapel as its base.

On a regular basis, musical performances were held at Noddfa. "In the pages of the future historian of musical progress in the Rhondda Valley', wrote one correspondent reviewing the Christmas concert programme in 1907, "the achievements of the Noddfa (Treorchy) Choral Society will loom large". The choir was led by J.J. Jones, the organist at Noddfa, and was said to have "a unique position amongst South Wales choirs, seeking not financial benefits, but the provision of high-class treats for the people." The report reflects how Noddfa played a central role in the musical culture of the valley.

== Later history ==
Noddfa was severely damaged by fire started by vandals in 1986. The building was declared unsafe and subsequently demolished. The records of the church are held by the Glamorgan Archives.
