= John Cory =

British coal-owner, ship-owner and philanthropist (1828–1910)

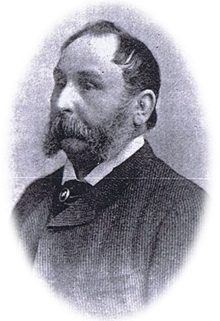
- Born: 18 March 1828; Bideford, Devonshire, England
- Died: 27 January 1910 (aged 81); Dyffryn, Vale of Glamorgan, Wales
- Occupations: Philanthropist, coal-owner, and ship-owner

John Cory (18 March 1828 – 27 January 1910) was a British philanthropist, coal-owner and ship-owner. Cory Way is named after him in the eastern area of Barry Docks, which he was involved with building in the 1880s.

== Family ==
John Cory was born on 28 March 1828, at Bideford, Devon. He was the eldest of five sons of Richard Cory (1790–1882) by Sarah (died 5 October 1868), daughter of John Woollacott, both of Bideford. The family traces descent through Walter Cory (died 1530) of Cory in West Putford, Devonshire, to Sir Walter de Cory, who in the reign of King John (1166–1216) married the eventual co-heiress of the Levingtons in Cumberland. After trading for years with Cardiff in coasters, Richard Cory settled in the town about 1831, opening a ship-chandler's store, to which he soon added a shipbroking business. About 1835 he began exporting coal, first as agent and later on his own account.

== Family business ==
In 1844 Richard Cory's two eldest sons, John and Richard (born 1830), joined him in the business, which was renamed Richard Cory & Sons, and from 1859, when the father retired, as Cory Brothers. The firm's shipping and coal-exporting business steadily increased, and the universal demand for South Wales steam coal for navigation led John Cory to conceive the idea of establishing foreign coal depots around the world, one of the earliest being established at Port Said on the opening of the Suez Canal in 1869. At the time of his death the firm had in all about eighty such depots on the shipping routes to India, China, South Africa, and South America.

About 1868 the firm had acquired its first colliery, that of Pentre, Rhondda, to which others in the same valley, and in the Ogmore and Neath valleys, were later added. Large colliery interests were also acquired elsewhere. In 1883 Cory became associated with other Rhondda coal-owners in the promotion of the Barry dock and railway, in which he afterwards held a large interest, and became vice-chairman of its company. In 1888 Cory's firm was converted into a limited company, but its entire control remained in the hands of members of the family, his three sons becoming directors, and Cory himself chairman of the board.

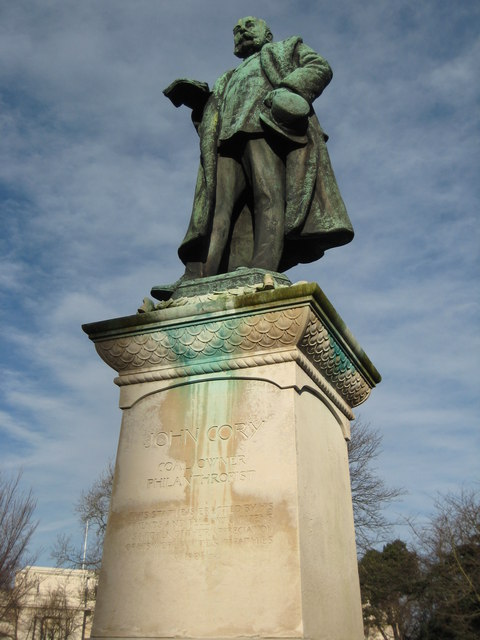
Statue of John Cory, Cathays Park

== Teetotaler and Methodist ==
When in 1836 teetotalism was first advocated in Cardiff, Cory's father is reputed to have been the first to sign the pledge, and he soon became the recognized leader of the movement in the town, his co-workers being nicknamed ‘Coryites’. Though a churchman, and for a time a churchwarden, he was led by his zeal for total abstinence to associate himself with one of the minor Methodist bodies. His second son, Richard, became a Baptist, and the eldest, John, a Wesleyan Methodist, all three being noted for their interest in temperance and evangelical work.

John Cory was one of the earliest supporters of "General" William Booth. Besides many other generous contributions to the Salvation Army, he gave it Maendy Hall at Ton Pentre, with thirty acres of land, as a home of rest. Among the many other institutions to which he gave liberally were the Band of Hope and Dr. Barnardo's Homes. In many seaports he established soldiers' and sailors' rests (e.g. at Cardiff, Barry, Milford Haven), one of the best known, built for the British and Foreign Sailors' Society (of which he was president), being the John Cory Hall in Poplar. In Cardiff he gave the police institute at a cost of £3,000 (besides contributing annually to its maintenance), the original YMCA building, £6,500 to the University College, and gifts to Aberdare Hall (women students' hostel), £2,000 to the Seamen's Hospital, and large sums to the infirmary. For many years before his death his benefactions amounted to nearly £50,000 a year. He was a member of the Cardiff school board for twenty-three years, and gave annually a large number of prizes for proficiency in Bible knowledge. In politics he was a liberal.

== Public life ==
Cory was one of the original members of Glamorgan County Council when it was established in 1889 and served as a councillor for the Barry ward, and as an alderman, until he was narrowly defeated at the 1898 election.

== Estate and legacy ==
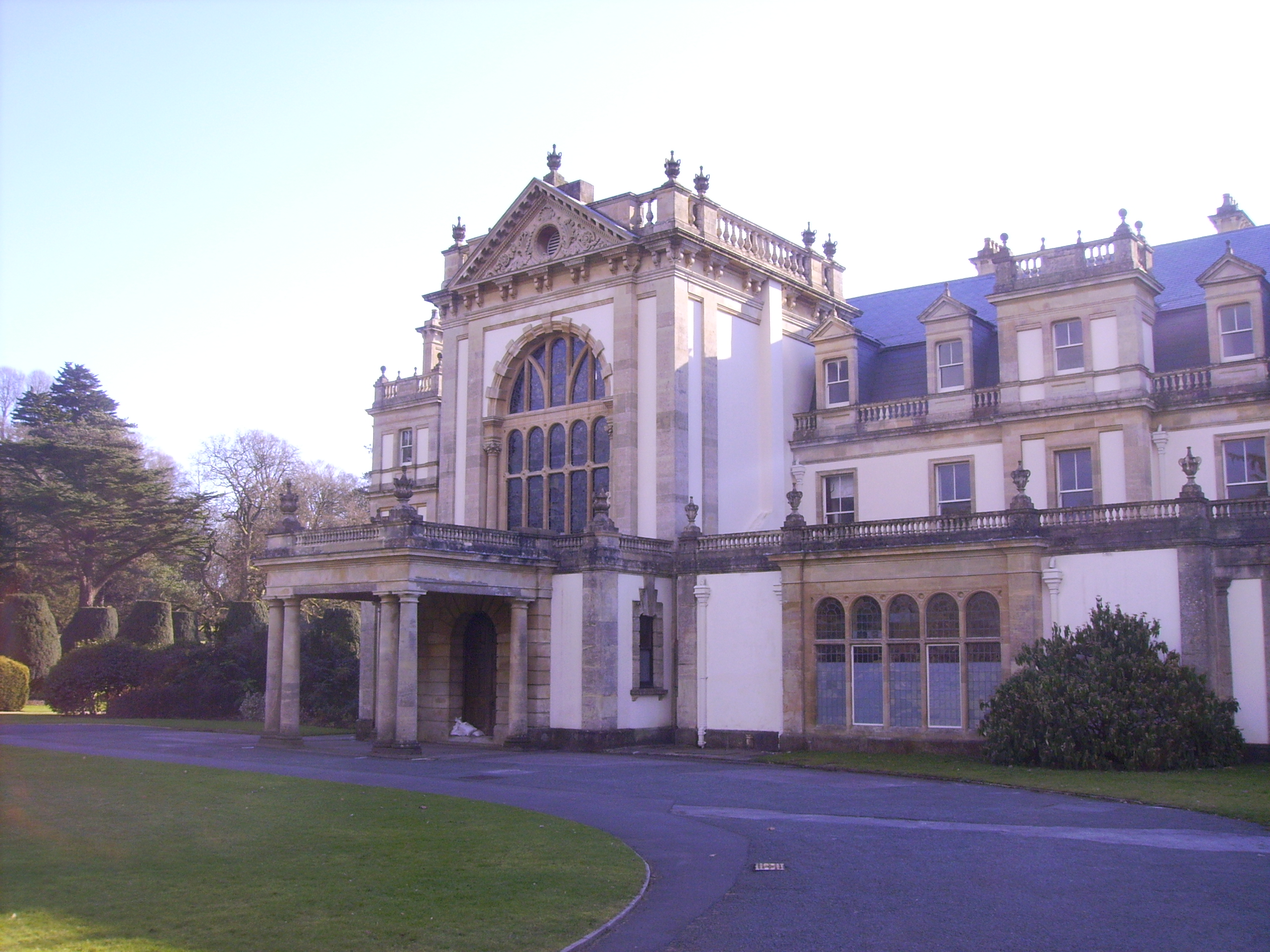
The North front of Dyffryn House

After living for some years at Vaendre Hall, in St Mellons near Cardiff, he acquired the manor of Dyffryn, St. Nicholas, near Cowbridge, and in 1907 began laying out part of the estate, near Peterston, as a garden village under the name of Glyn Cory Garden Village. It was the first garden suburb in Wales. He also converted the inn at St. Nicholas into a temperance house, with reading-rooms and mission hall. He died at Dyffryn on 27 Jan. 1910, and was buried at St. Nicholas, a memorial service, presided over by the bishop of Llandaff, being simultaneously held at Park Hall, Cardiff. By his will he left (including his reversionary bequests) about a quarter of a million sterling for charitable purposes, of which £20,000 was given to the Salvation Army, one half of it to be applied to its foreign work, the other half to its home and rescue work. He also gave £5,000 each to the Cardiff Infirmary, the Bible Society, Spezzia Mission, and Müller's Orphanage. Cory's third son, Reginald, an eminent horticulturalist, developed the Dyffryn estate further.

In June 1906 a statue in bronze of Cory, by Goscombe John, was placed in Cathays Park, Cardiff.

On 19 Sept. 1854, at St. Paul's Church, Newport, John Cory married Anna Maria, daughter of John Beynon, colliery proprietor, of Newport, Wales. She died in August 1909, leaving by him one daughter and three sons, of whom the second, Clifford Cory, of Llantarnam, Monmouthshire, became Liberal Member of Parliament for the St. Ives division of Cornwall in 1906, and was made a baronet in 1907.

== Sources ==
- "Cory". Burke's Peerage. 1910.
- Jenkins, John Austin; James, R. Edwards (1901). The History of Nonconformity in Cardiff. Cardiff.
- This article incorporates text from a publication now in the public domain: Thomas, Daniel Lleufer (1912). "Cory, John". In Lee, Sidney (ed.). Dictionary of National Biography (2nd supplement). Vol. 12. London: Smith, Elder & Co.
