= John Thomas (Welsh politician) =

Welsh politician and trade unionist

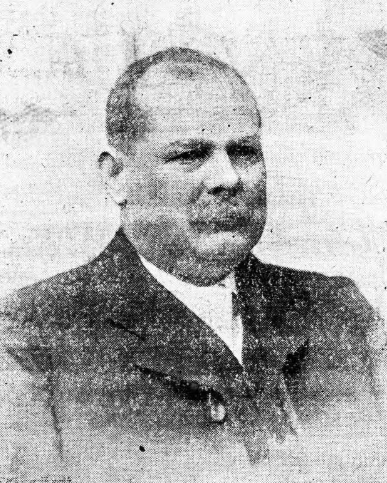
Thomas in 1914

John Thomas Alderman was born 1852 at Coity, and was a Welsh politician and trade unionist.

Born in Coity, Thomas worked at a coal mine from an early age, and eventually became a hewer at the coal face. He was next elected as a checkweighman in Caerphilly, but decided to emigrate to the United States to find better-paid work.

After a short period, Thomas returned to Wales, and in about 1887 was elected as full-time agent for the Garw Miners' Association. A supporter of the Liberal Party, he stood for election in the Garw Valley ward at the 1892 Glamorgan County Council election, defeating the incumbent. On the council, he focused his time on the sanitary and asylum committees. He was also elected to the Garw School Board.

In 1898, the Garw Miners' Association became part of the South Wales Miners' Federation. Thomas continued as agent of its Garw Valley District, and also served on the union's executive committee. He was removed from his trade union post in 1912, after losing the confidence of the steam coal lodges. A few house coal lodges disagreed, and installed Thomas as leader of a Lower Garw District, but this did not attract official recognition, and soon petered out.

From the mid-1900s, Thomas lived in Tondu. He was a Baptist, and regularly attended the local church. He remained on the council for many years, spending some time as an alderman. From 1914, he also served as a magistrate.

He wrote a book called "Historical sketches of the Eastern Association".

Trade union offices
Preceded by New position	Agent of the Garw District of the South Wales Miners' Federation; 1898–1912	Succeeded by Frank Hodges
