= Rhondda Labour and Liberal Association =

The Rhondda Labour and Liberal Association was a political grouping in the Rhondda, Glamorgan, Wales which sought to bridge the gulf between middle-class Liberal supporters and trade unionists who supported the principle of electing working men to public office. It was founded in the wake of the 1885 General Election in the Rhondda when William Abraham (Mabon) triumphed over the official Liberal candidate, Frederick Lewis Davis.

== Bibliography ==
- Williams, Chris (1996). Democratic Rhondda: politics and Society 1885-1951. Cardiff: University of Wales Press.
