= Ystradyfodwg School Board =

The Ystradyfodwg School Board, covering the rapidly growing Rhondda Valleys was formed in 1878 and consisted of thirteen members elected for a period of three years. It was abolished, along with other School Boards in 1902 and its responsibilities transferred to Glamorgan County Council.

In the main, the members were local industrialists, tradesmen, nonconformist ministers and, in later years, a smattering of working men. A number of prominent figures in the public life of the Rhondda served their apprenticeship on the Board.

== The 1878 School Board Election ==
Ystradyfodwg School Board
Party	Candidate	Votes	%	±%
	William Jenkins, Ystradfechan	4,221		
	David Evans, Bodringallt	3,371		
	D. Richards, Treorchy	3,048		
	W.W. Hood	2,828		
	Rev William Morris	2,807		
	David D. Joseph, Treherbert	2,634		
	R. Rowlands, Penygraig	2,337		
	T. Owen, Treherbert	2,107		
	William Abraham (Mabon)	2,040		
	E. Thomas, Maindy Hall, Ystrad	1,130		
	Rev W. Jones, Ystrad	1,025		

The initial Board included William Abraham (Mabon), the future MP for the Rhondda.

== The 1881 School Board Election ==
The second election took place in 1881. "On the whole, commented a local newspaper, "we think this may be taken to be a fair representative Board."

Ystradyfodwg School Board
Party	Candidate	Votes	%	±%
	W.W. Hood*	6,214		
	William Jenkins, Ystradfechan*	4,855		
	Henry Lewis, Ynysfeio	4,157		
	David Evans, Bodringallt*	4,063		
	Moses R. Rowlands, Penygraig*	3,305		
	Rev J.R, Jones, Llwynypia	2,700		
	Rev William Morris*	2,807		
	David D. Joseph, Treherbert*	2,610		
	Rev W. Lewis, vicar	2,279		
	Edmund Thomas, Maindy Hall, Ystrad*	2,232		
	W. Taylor, Fernhill Colliery	2,014		
	E.H. Davies, Baglan House	1,979		
	William Morgan, Tynewydd	1,903		
	Rev W. Jones, Ton*	1,798		
	John John	1,317		

== The 1884 School Board Election ==
The third election took place in 1884.

Ystradyfodwg School Board
Party	Candidate	Votes	%	±%
	David Evans, Bodringallt*	6,285		
	William Jenkins, Ystradfechan*	5,737		
	W.W. Hood*	5,582		
	Rev William Morris*	5,248		
	John Davies, Maerdy	5,216		
	W. Taylor, Treherbert*	4,603		
	Rev W. Jones, Ton	3,808		
	E.H. Davies, Ystrad	3,719		
	Rev B. Davies, Treorchy	3,167		
	Rev W. Lewis, vicar	3,127		
	David Ellis, Ynyshir	2,505		
	Moses R. Rowlands, Penygraig*	2,413		
	John John, Treherbert	2,091		
	D.W. Davies, Tonypandy	2,007		
	Rev J.R, Jones, Llwynypia	1,503		

== The 1887 School Board Election ==
Following the success of William Abraham (Mabon) at the 1885 General Election the School Board election was contested by Labour candidates.

Ystradyfodwg School Board
Party	Candidate	Votes	%	±%
	David Evans, Bodringallt*	9,431		
	W.W. Hood*	7,975		
	William Pritchard, Clydach Vale	6,854		
	Rev William Lewis, vicar*	6,640		
	William Morgan, Tynewydd	6,639		
	Alfred Lester Lewis, Treherbert	6,635		
	Rev John Salisbury Edwards, Treorchy	5,115		
	Samuel Hussey Williams, Tylorstown	5,001		
	William Jenkins, Ystradfechan*	4,940		
	David Thomas, check weigher, Pentre	4,457		
	Rev William Morris*	4,038		
	Rev W. Jones, Ton*	3,864		
	John Morgan, Ynyshir Hotel	3,626		
	John Davies, Maerdy*	3,141		
	J.H. Williams, Blaenrhondda	2,949		
	Moses R. Rowlands, Penygraig*	2,732		
	Evan Richards, Tonypandy	2,226		
	E.H. Davies, Ystrad*	2,389		
	Idris Williams*	647		
	W. Hogg, Pontypridd	510		

== The 1890 School Board Election ==
The fifth election was held in October 1890.

Ystradyfodwg School Board
Party	Candidate	Votes	%	±%
	W. Walter Hood*	10,909		
	Thomas Bevan, Ferndale	8,365		
	William Jenkins, Ystradfechan*	8,112		
	William Pritchard, Clydach Vale*	7,988		
	Rev William Lewis, vicar*	5,912		
	Samuel Henry Williams, Tylorstown*	5,731		
	William Morgan, Tynewydd*	5,719		
	Alfred Leslie Lewis, Treherbert*	6,635		
	Joseph Williams, Blaenrhondda	4,902		
	Rev John Salisbury Edwards, Treorchy*	4,901		
	Rev W. Jones, Ton*	4,798		
	Daniel Lewis, Trealaw	4,519		
	Morgan Davies, Mardy	4,441		
	David Lloyd, Ystrad	3,873		
Labour	Morgan Williams	3,718		
	John Jones Griffiths	3,661		
Labour	Llewellyn Thomas, Mardy	3,541		
Labour	David Thomas, check weigher, Pentre*	3,298		
	Mrs Elizabeth Davies	2,12x		

== The 1893 School Board Election ==
The sixth election was held in October 1893.

Ystradyfodwg School Board
Party	Candidate	Votes	%	±%
	W. Walter Hood*	14,367		
	Thomas Bevan, Ferndale*	9,400		
	William Jenkins, Ystradfechan*	9,216		
	Daniel Thomas, Trealaw*	8,794		
	William Pritchard, Clydach Vale*	7,988		
	Rev William Lewis, vicar*	5,912		
	Samuel Henry Williams, Tylorstown*	5,731		
	William Morgan, Tynewydd*	5,719		
	Alfred Leslie Lewis, Treherbert*	6,635		
	Joseph Williams, Blaenrhondda	4,902		
	Rev John Salisbury Edwards, Treorchy*	4,901		
	Rev W. Jones, Ton*	4,798		
	Morgan Davies, Mardy	4,441		
	David Lloyd, Ystrad	3,873		
Labour	Morgan Williams	3,718		
	John Jones Griffiths	3,661		
Labour	Llewellyn Thomas, Mardy	3,541		
Labour	David Thomas, check weigher, Pentre*	3,298		
	Mrs Elizabeth Davies	2,12x		
