= Frederick Lewis Davis =

Frederick Lewis Davis (30 January 1863 − 17 May 1920) was a Liberal politician and a member of a notable family of coal owners in South Wales. His grandfather, David Davis, Blaengwawr was a pioneer of the coal trade in the Aberdare valley while his father, Lewis Davis and uncle, David Davis, Maesyffynnon developed the business and were pioneers of the coal trade in the Rhondda, most notably at Ferndale. Having trained as a barrister, Davis joined the family business.

When "D. Davis & Sons Ltd., Ferndale Steam Coal Collieries" was successfully floated as a public company in May 1890, the prospectus cited him as chairman of the company. This float was managed by Robert William Perks (1849–1934).

== Political career ==
In 1885, Davis was chosen as the Liberal candidate for the new Rhondda constituency but he was opposed by the trade union leader, William Abraham (Mabon).

The constituency had been formed following the Representation of the People Act 1884, as a result of the rapid growth of population in the two valleys over the previous twenty years. During the 1880s the demand for working men representatives in the ranks of the Parliamentary Liberal Party were increasingly vociferous and there was a precedent for a Liberal-Labour (Lib-Lab) candidate in South Wales as Thomas Halliday had contested Merthyr Tydfil in 1874.

The local trade union, the Rhondda Steam Coal Miners' Association, laid claim to the candidacy as early as 1883, on the basis that the franchise had been extended to many working men within the county constituencies and that in Mabon, their agent for six years they had the ideal candidate. The local Liberal Association, however, formed in early 1885, was dominated by middle-class business and professional men, and included a disproportionate number of colliery officials. Fred L. Davis's father, Lewis Davis of Ferndale, was selected as president of the association. Shortly afterwards, Lewis Davis was invited by the Association to be its parliamentary candidate and defeated Mabon in a ballot by 143 votes to 51. In spite of his selection, however, he declined and proposed that his son be the candidate. In a further ballot, F. L. Davis again defeated Mabon by 125 votes to 56.

The refusal of the trade union movement to accept this decision and to support an independent campaign by Mabon is regarded as an important watershed in the political history of South Wales. In terms of policy there was little apparent difference between the candidates, with the only notable difference being that Mabon supported the payment of MPs while Davis did not. The campaign was therefore waged on other grounds. Davis's supporters claimed that Mabon lacked legitimacy, having been rejected by the Liberal Association. Mabon's adherents, in turn, claimed that the miners' and held mass meetings throughout the two valleys to promote his candidature long before the middle-class-dominated Association was established. Davis's youth and inexperience was a major issue, although he had qualified as a barrister. There were also claims of intimidation on both sides. Mabon's supporters were said to be victimised at the workplace while several of Davis's meetings were disrupted by violence.

Class therefore became a major issue in the campaign. The vast majority of Mabon' supporters were trade union activists and working men, along with a relatively small number of tradesmen and professionals, some of whom had links of one form or another to the miners' union. These included Walter H. Morgan of Pontypridd, often described as the miners' lawyer. One nonconformist minister, supported Mabon, namely John Salisbury Edwards of Treorchy. In contest, Davis had the support of the vast majority of the middle-classes in the Rhondda, and natural deference together with the paternalistic influence of the Davis family, in the Rhondda Fach in particular, was a factor.

On polling day, Mabon scored a clear and decisive victory.

After the result, the Davis family accepted Mabon's victory and he was not challenged thereafter for the parliamentary seat. Following the election, Mabon's supporters established the Rhondda Labour and Liberal Association which shortly afterwards absorbed the rival Liberal Association which had supported Davis.

In 1889, Davis was elected to Glamorgan County Council and was immediately selected as one of the first aldermen. However, he served for only one six-year term and did not seek re-election.

== Bibliography ==
- Williams, Chris (1996). Democratic Rhondda: politics and Society 1885-1951. Cardiff: University of Wales Press.
