= Daronwy Isaac =

Welsh politician and trade unionist

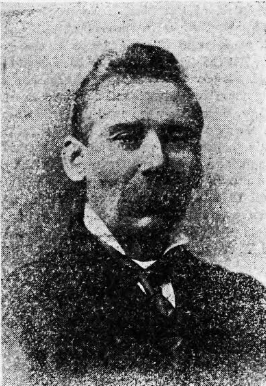
Daronwy in 1900

Thomas Daronwy Isaac (died 2 March 1903), often known simply as Daronwy, was a Welsh politician and trade unionist.

Born in western Carmarthenshire, Isaac moved to Aberdare in his youth, to find work at a coal mine. By 1876, he was an experienced miner, and moved to Treorchy, where he met William Abraham. The two initially found themselves on opposite sides of a legal matter, but soon became friends, and worked together in the Cambrian Miners' Association.

Miners in the area were paid according to a sliding scale, which rose and fell in line with the export price of coal. Daronwy was elected to the important sliding scale committee in 1889, and consistently spoke in support of the concept, even after it was abandoned, in 1898.

In 1889, Daronwy was elected as vice-president of the Rhondda Labour and Liberal Association, and he later succeeded T. P. Jenkins as its president. He was elected in the Treorchy ward at the 1892 Glamorgan County Council election, defeating an official Liberal Party candidate, and remained on the council until 1901.

The Cambrian Miners' Association became part of the South Wales Miners' Federation (SWMF) in 1898, and Daronwy was elected to its first executive committee. In 1900, Mabon resigned his secondary position as agent to the Anthracite District of the SWMF. Daronwy was elected as his replacement, taking 2,805 votes, narrowly beating David Morris and Morgan James. He moved to Swansea to take up the post, but by this time his health was in decline, and he died early in 1903.

Trade union offices
Preceded by William Abraham	Agent of the Anthracite District of the South Wales Miners' Federation; 1900–1903	Succeeded by John Daniel Morgan
