= List of public art in Rhondda Cynon Taf =

Map of Wales with Rhondda Cynon Taf highlighted

This is a list of public art in Rhondda Cynon Taf, a country borough in south Wales. This list applies only to works of public art on permanent display in an outdoor public space and does not, for example, include artworks in museums.

== Aberdare ==
Image	Title / subject	Location and coordinates	Date	Artist / designer	Type	Material	Dimensions	Designation	Wikidata	Notes
	The Spirit of Industry	Aberdare Park, Aberdare	1905		Statue on pedestal	Stone and granite				
More images	William Lewis, 1st Baron Merthyr	Aberdare Park, Aberdare	1912, unveiled 1913	Thomas Brock	Statue on pedestal	Bronze and granite		Grade II	Q29489480	
	Caradog, Griffith Rhys Jones	Victoria Square, Aberdare	1920	Goscombe John	Statue on pedestal	Bronze and stone		Grade II	Q29489462	
	War memorial	Victoria Square, Aberdare	1922		Cenotaph	Granite	6m high	Grade II	Q29489459	
	Gorsedd stones	Aberdare Park, Aberdare	1956		Stone circle	Stone				Erected for the 1956 National Eisteddfod of Wales.

== Ferndale ==
Image	Title / subject	Location and coordinates	Date	Artist / designer	Type	Material	Dimensions	Designation	Wikidata	Notes
	War memorial	Darren Park, Ferndale			Cenotaph with plaques	Stone and marble				

== Hirwaun ==
Image	Title / subject	Location and coordinates	Date	Artist / designer	Type	Material	Dimensions	Designation	Wikidata	Notes
	War memorial	Hirwaun	1924	E.W.G. Richards (architect), E.P. Davies (builder)	Clock tower	Stone and slate		Grade II	Q29503694	

== Llanharan ==
Image	Title / subject	Location and coordinates	Date	Artist / designer	Type	Material	Dimensions	Designation	Wikidata	Notes
	War memorial	Llanharan	c.1920s, relocated 1960		Statue on pedestal	Portland stone		Grade II	Q29501378	

== Llantrisant ==
Image	Title / subject	Location and coordinates	Date	Artist / designer	Type	Material	Dimensions	Designation	Wikidata	Notes
	Dr. William Price	Bullring, Llantrisant	1981	Peter Nicholas	Statue	Bronze		Grade II	Q64531381	
	War memorial	Bullring, Llantrisant	2016	M. John (designer), David Peterson (sculptor), Atlas Stone Co. (builders)	Cenotaph	Portland stone and slate	3m tall			

== Llwynypia ==
Image	Title / subject	Location and coordinates	Date	Artist / designer	Type	Material	Dimensions	Designation	Wikidata	Notes
	Sir Archibald Hood	Llwynypia	1905	Walter Merrett	Statue and plinth	Painted bronze and stone		Grade II	Q29495688	
	Miner and Family	Between Llwynypia and Tonypandy	1993	Robert Thomas	Statue group on plinth	Bronze				

== Maerdy ==
Image	Title / subject	Location and coordinates	Date	Artist / designer	Type	Material	Dimensions	Designation	Wikidata	Notes
	War memorial	Maerdy Park, Maerdy	c.1920s & 2015		Statue on pillar and plinth	Stone and granite				Black granite plinth erected 2015
	Maerdy Gateway Miner's Memorial	Maerdy	2015		Colliery winding wheel and plinth	Metal and stone				

== Mountain Ash ==
Image	Title / subject	Location and coordinates	Date	Artist / designer	Type	Material	Dimensions	Designation	Wikidata	Notes
	War memorial	Hospital Road, Mountain Ash	1922	James Havard Thomas & James Dune	Statue on plinth with relief panels	Stone and bronze				
	Guto Nyth Brân	Oxford Street, Mountain Ash	1990	Peter Nicholas	Statue on base	Bronze and stone	2m tall			
	Elaine Morgan	Outside of Medical Centre, Mountain Ash	2022	Emma Rodgers	Statue on plinth	Bronze				

== Penrhys ==
Image	Title / subject	Location and coordinates	Date	Artist / designer	Type	Material	Dimensions	Designation	Wikidata	Notes
More images	Our Lady of Penrhys	Penrhys	1953		Statue on plinth	Portland stone				

== Pontypridd ==
Image	Title / subject	Location and coordinates	Date	Artist / designer	Type	Material	Dimensions	Designation	Wikidata	Notes
More images	Evan James & James James	Ynysangharad War Memorial Park, Pontypridd	1930	Goscombe John	Statues on plinths	Bronze and stone		Grade II*	Q17743403	
	Falklands War memorial	Ynysangharad War Memorial Park, Pontypridd	1982		Monolith	Stone				
	Great War Memorial Wall	Ynysangharad War Memorial Park, Pontypridd	2011	Capita Symonds (designer), Costain (builders)	Memorial wall	Stone and marble				
	World War II Memorial Wall	Ynysangharad War Memorial Park, Pontypridd	2011	Capita Symonds (designer), Costain (builders)	Memorial wall	Stone and marble				

== Tonypandy ==
Image	Title / subject	Location and coordinates	Date	Artist / designer	Type	Material	Dimensions	Designation	Wikidata	Notes
	War memorial	Dunraven Street, Tonypandy	1927		Cenotaph	Stone				

== Tonyrefail ==
Image	Title / subject	Location and coordinates	Date	Artist / designer	Type	Material	Dimensions	Designation	Wikidata	Notes
	War memorial	Trane cemetery, Tonyrefail	1924		Statue on pillar	Stone				

== Treorchy ==
Image	Title / subject	Location and coordinates	Date	Artist / designer	Type	Material	Dimensions	Designation	Wikidata	Notes
	Gorsedd stones	Treorchy	1928		Stone circle	Stone				Erected for the 1928 National Eisteddfod of Wales.
	Civilian war memorial	Cwmparc School, Treorchy			Mosaic mural	Stone				Memorial to 27 civilians killed 29 April 1941
