= Baron Merthyr =

Barony in the Peerage of the United Kingdom

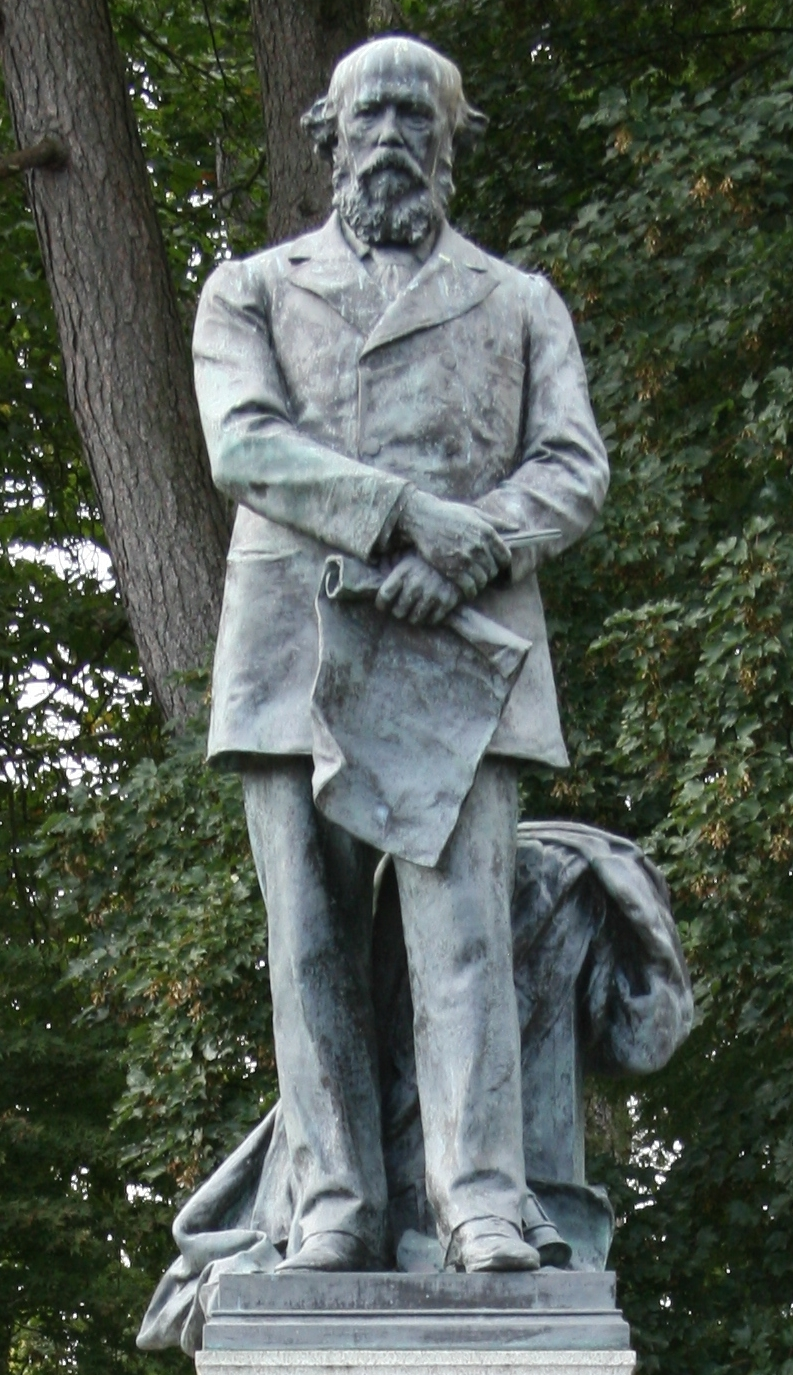
Statue of William Lewis, 1st Baron Merthyr, at Aberdare Park

Baron Merthyr, of Senghenydd in the County of Glamorgan, is a title in the Peerage of the United Kingdom. It was created in 1911 for the Welsh coal mining magnate Sir William Lewis, 1st Baronet. He had already been created a baronet, of Nantgwyne in the County of Glamorgan, on 15 February 1896. The barony is named after the town of Merthyr Tydfil, where Lewis was born. Lord Merthyr's grandson, the third Baron, was Chairman of Committees in the House of Lords from 1957 to 1965 and a Deputy Speaker from 1957 to 1974. The latter was succeeded by his son, the fourth Baron. He disclaimed the peerage for life on 26 April 1977, three weeks after succeeding his father. He did not use his title of baronet either. He died on 5 August 2015.

== Barons Merthyr (1911) ==
- William Thomas Lewis, 1st Baron Merthyr (1837–1914)
- Herbert Clark Lewis, 2nd Baron Merthyr (1866–1932)
- William Brereton Couchman Lewis, 3rd Baron Merthyr (1901–1977)
- Trevor Oswin Lewis, 4th Baron Merthyr (1935–2015) (disclaimed 1977)
- David Trevor Lewis, 5th Baron Merthyr (born 1977)

The heir presumptive is the present holder's uncle, Peter Herbert Lewis (born 1937).

== Line of succession ==
- William Thomas Lewis, 1st Baron Merthyr (1837–1914)
  - Herbert Clark Lewis, 2nd Baron Merthyr (1866–1932)
    - William Brereton Couchman Lewis, 3rd Baron Merthyr (1901–1977)
      - Trevor Oswin Lewis (1935–2015) (disclaimed 1977)
        - David Tresor Lewis, 5th Baron Merthyr (born 1977)
      - (1) Lt-Col. Hon. Peter Herbert Lewis (b. 1937)
      - (2) Hon. John Frederick Lewis (b. 1938)
        - (3) Paul William Lewis (b. 1979)
      - (4) Hon. Robin William Lewis (b. 1941)
        - (5) Christopher William Lewis (b. 1970)
          - (6) Cosimo William Babo Lewis (b. 2001)
      - (7) Hon. Antony Thomas Lewis (b. 1947)

== Arms ==
Coat of arms of Baron Merthyr
Crest An eagle displayed Azure charged on the breast with a bee volant Or and holding in the beak a roll of paper Argent. Escutcheon Sable a lion rampant Argent overall a fess Or charged with three bees volant Proper. Supporters Dexter and sinister, a lion rampant Sable charged on the shoulder with a bezant thereon a bee volant Proper. Motto 1st Gwna A Ddylit Doed A Ddel 2nd Hirbarhad.

== Extended family ==
The Hon. Robin Lewis, fourth son of the third Baron, was appointed Lord Lieutenant of Dyfed in December 2006, reported in the London Gazette in September 2007.

== Notes ==
Baronetage of the United Kingdom
Preceded by Arnott baronets	Lewis baronets of Nantgywne; 15 February 1896	Succeeded by Coddington baronets
