= Cultural depictions of Edward the Black Prince =

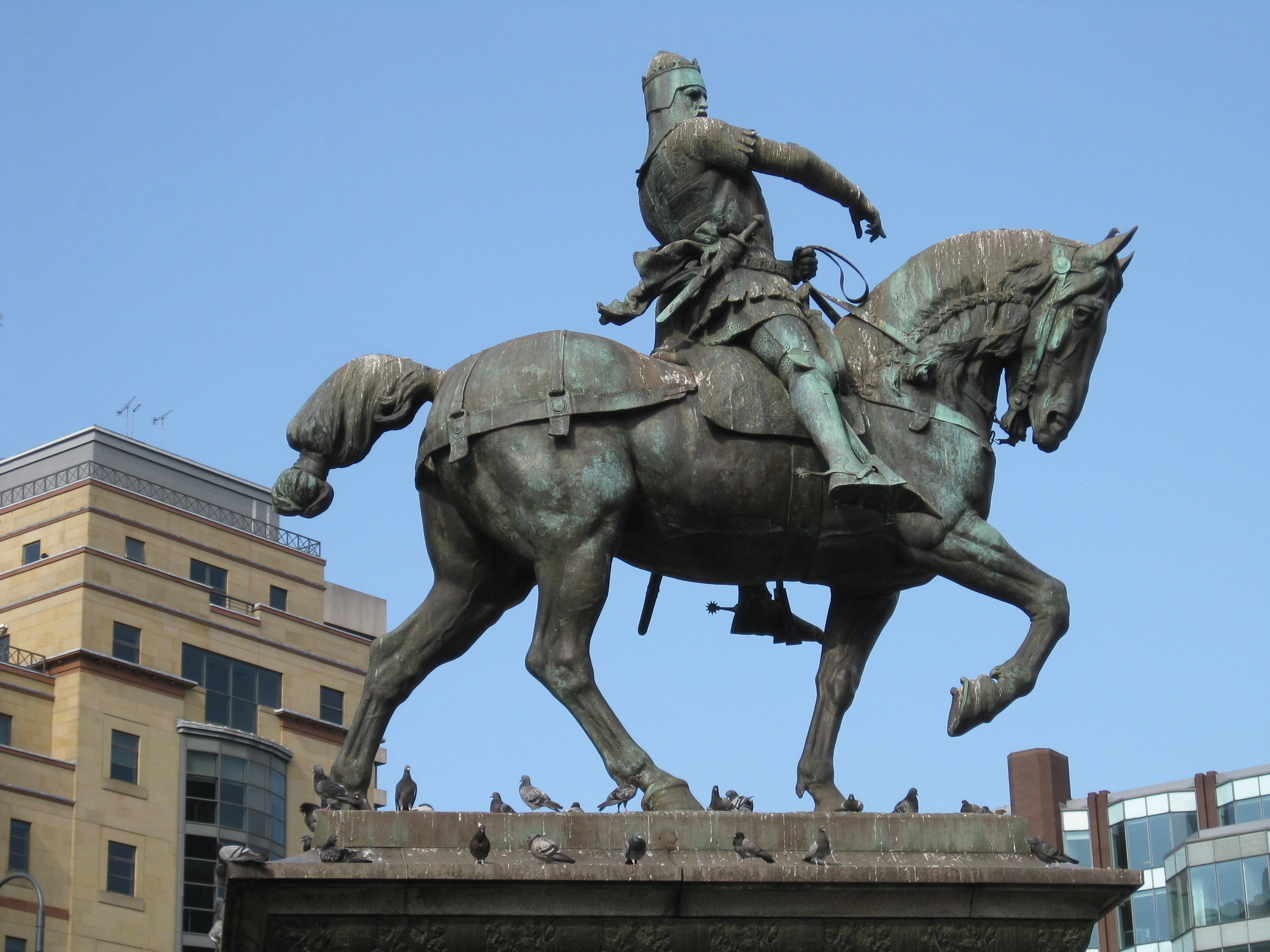
The statue of Edward the Black Prince in Leeds City Square

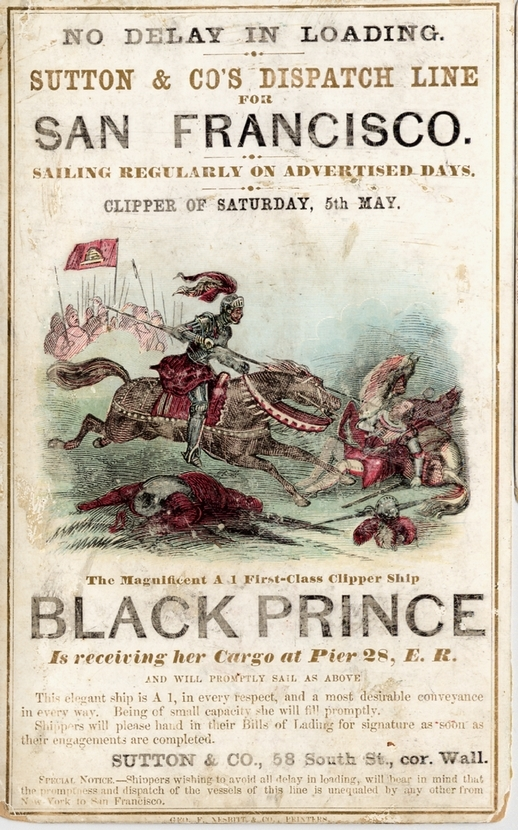
Clipper ship Black Prince

Edward the Black Prince has been depicted in art, film, literature, plays and games.

== Plays ==
Edward the Black Prince features prominently as a character in Edward III, a sixteenth-century play possibly partly attributable to William Shakespeare.

Edward is referred to in Shakespeare's Richard II and Henry V.

Roger Boyle, 1st Earl of Orrery devoted his 1667 play The Black Prince to Edward.

The 1750 play Edward the Black Prince by William Shirley was performed at Drury Lane.

== Novels ==
- As a Black Prince on Bloody Fields by Thomas W. Jensen (2014).
- I Serve: A Novel of the Black Prince by Rosanne E. Lortz (2009).
- Cressy and Poictiers (the story of the Black Prince's Page) by J. G. Edgar (1906).
- St George for England by G. A. Henty (1884).
- With the Black Prince by W. Stoddard (1898).
- A French novel Confessions du prince noir by Fabrice Hurlin (2005).
- The Messenger of the Black Prince by Thomas A. H. Mawhinney (1928).
- Anthony Burgess announced in a 1972 interview to have written a plan for a novel about the Black Prince which would incorporate John Dos Passos' narrative techniques, although he never finished writing it. After Burgess's death, English writer Adam Roberts completed this novel, and it was published in 2018.
- Edward makes appearances in Sir Arthur Conan Doyle's historical novels The White Company and Sir Nigel.
- Edward features in two of Jean Plaidy’s novels: The Vow on the Heron (1980), about Edward III, and The Passage to Pontefract (1981), about Richard II.
- Edward is the protagonist of The English Paragon, by Marjorie Bowen.
- Edward plays an important role in three novels about his wife Jean of Kent: The Shadow Queen by Anne O'Brien (2017), The Fair Maid of Kent by Caroline Newark (2017), and Lady of the Garter – one of the most extraordinary women of the Plantagenet era (The Plantagenets Book 4) by Juliet Dymoke (1979).
- Edward and Joan are major characters in Karen Harper's The First Princess of Wales.
- Edward and Joan are supporting characters in The Lady Royal, by Molly Costain Haycraft, a fictional account of the life of Edward's sister Isabella.
- Edward and Joan also appear in supporting roles in two novels about Edward's brother John's romance with Katherine Swynford: Anya Seton's 1954 novel Katherine, and Anne O'Brien's 2014 novel, The Scandalous Duchess.
- The Secrets at Court by Blythe Gifford (2014) where Edward and Joan are supporting characters.
- Edward appears in the Gordon R. Dickson novel The Dragon Knight, and also with Joan in Dickson's novel The Dragon and the Fair Maid of Kent.
- Edward appears as a participant in the Crécy campaign in Bernard Cornwell's novel Harlequin (published in the U.S. as The Archer's Tale). He also features in the sequel 1356.
- The character Pyle in Graham Greene's novel The Quiet American has a dog named Prince after The Black Prince. Fowler says to him, "the one who massacred all the women and children in Limoges".
- The character of Robert Godwin in Susan Howatch's historical novel The Wheel of Fortune is based on Edward.
- Edward plays an important role in two novels by Rebecca Gablé, a German writer of historical fiction (as child in Der König der purpurnen Stadt, as an adult in Das Lächeln der Fortuna).
- Edward makes an appearance in the novel By Right of Arms, by Robyn Carr, as a supporter and friend of the main character.
- The dying Black Prince and his Berkhampstead court provide most of the background for Christabel R. Coleridge's 1896 juvenile novel Minstrel Dick. A Tale of the XIVth Century.
- Edward appears in a Reeve Clara's novel about his illegitimate son (1793): Memoirs of Sir Roger de Clarendon, the Natural Son of Edward, Prince of Wales, Commonly Called the Black Prince: With Anecdotes of Many Other Eminent Persons of the Fourteenth Century.
- He also features in the French novel Les rois maudits tome 7: Quand un roi perd la France by Maurice Druon (1977).
- Edward appears in another French novel La lumière et la boue: Quand surgira l'étoile absinthe by Michel Peyramaure (1992).
- Edward appears as the Prince of Wales in World Without End, by Ken Follett, during the battle of Crécy, where he is rescued by one of the main characters, Ralph FitzGerald (later Earl of Shiring).
- Edward and Canterbury Cathedral are mentioned in Chapter 52 of David Copperfield by Charles Dickens: "Yet the bells, when they sounded, told me sorrowfully of change in everything; told me of their own age, and my pretty Dora's youth; and of the many, never old, who had lived and loved and died, while the reverberations of the bells had hummed through the rusty armour of the Black Prince hanging up within, and, motes upon the deep of Time, had lost themselves in air, as circles do in water."
- The Black Prince appears in the novels of Thea Beckman, Give Me Space (1976), Triumph of Scorched Earth (1977) and Wheel of Fortune (1978)
- The Black Prince is mentioned in the 1927 short novel The Case of Charles Dexter Ward by H.P. Lovecraft, in which it implies there existed unknown darker secret on the reason of the Siege of Limoges.
- Edward is an antagonistic character in Emma Campion's 2014 novel, A Triple Knot. He is portrayed as rude, uncouth, and even somewhat sadistic in his pursuit of his cousin, Joan.
- Edward is featured as a minor character within the medieval Lions and Lilies series, books 1 to 4, by Catherine A. Wilson and Catherine T. Wilson: The Lily and the Lion, The Order of the Lily, The Gilded Crown and The Traitor's Noose.

== Art ==
- A large 1903 equestrian sculpture of the prince by Thomas Brock can be seen in City Square, Leeds. It was a gift from Colonel Thomas Walter Harding, Lord Mayor of Leeds between 1898 and 1899. The choice was probably also a tribute to the future Edward VII, then Prince of Wales, who opened Leeds Infirmary in 1867 and the Yorkshire College buildings (now the University of Leeds) in 1885. The statue is the centrepiece of an array of statues in the square, including more local people such as Joseph Priestley.
- The Black Prince at Crecy by Julian Russell Story is a large and detailed painting of Edward, in black armour, standing after a battle above vanquished enemy King John of Bohemia. The painting is on permanent display at the Telfair Museum of Art in Savannah, Georgia.

== Films ==
- The Black Prince is the main role played by Errol Flynn in The Dark Avenger (1955). The film was also known as The Warriors in the US, and The Black Prince in the UK, although the latter seems to have been a working title. In Greece it was aired on TV as The Black Knight.
- The Black Prince was portrayed by James Purefoy in the 2001 film A Knight's Tale. Though never intended to be historically accurate, the film puts a credible spin on Edward. He is portrayed as a benevolent prince who enjoys sneaking into jousting tournaments to compete anonymously. He is portrayed as kind to the protagonist, who impersonates a knight to compete in tournaments, helpfully knighting the protagonist when he is exposed as a peasant. Ironically, appearing incognito in tournaments was not uncommon, taking its inspiration from chivalric romances. The real Prince Edward's father, King Edward III, competed in tournaments disguised in the arms of other English knights.
- English SS volunteers in the 1965 alternate history film It Happened Here are part of the Black Prince Division, as seen briefly on their cuff titles at the end of the film when being massacred after surrendering.

== Comics ==
- The Black Prince features as a character in the 2007 graphic novel Crécy by Warren Ellis and Raulo Cáceres, an adaptation of the events of the Battle of Crécy.

== Games ==
- Edward is portrayed in the 2007 PlayStation 3 and Xbox 360 video game Bladestorm: The Hundred Years' War by Koei. Within this video game, he is seen as the inspirational commander of English forces, aspiring to conquer France for his father, though remaining compassionate to the feelings of the French peasantry, knowing that they would be his people upon success in France.
- Edward appears under the name of Black Prince in the game Empire Earth in the English campaign in the fourth and fifth scenario.
- Edward is also a key military commander in Medieval: Total War.
- A British cavalier named the "Black Prince" appeared in Age of Empires II map editor and is one of the random names for the Britons' commander in random map games. Edward the Black Prince also appears in Age of Empires IV as the main enemy during the siege of paris.
- In the game "Madness: Project Nexus", The Black Prince is referenced when clicking on the Iron Sword and reading its description.
