= Henry Tate =

English merchant and philanthropist (1819–1899)

Sir Henry Tate Bt
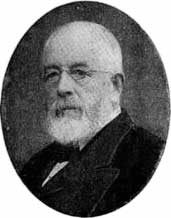
- Born: 11 March 1819; White Coppice, Lancashire, England
- Died: 5 December 1899 (aged 80); Streatham, London, England
- Burial place: West Norwood Cemetery
- Occupations: Merchant; sugar-baker; philanthropist
- Spouse: Jane Wignall (m. 1841; died 1883) Amy Hislop (m. 1885)
- Children: 3

Sir Henry Tate, 1st Baronet (11 March 1819 – 5 December 1899) was a British sugar merchant, sugar-baker and philanthropist, known for establishing the Tate Gallery and Henry Tate & Sons, which later became Tate & Lyle.

== Early life ==
Henry Tate was born in Chorley on 11 March 1819 to Agnes Tate (née Booth) and William Tate, a Unitarian clergyman.

== Career ==
When Tate was 13, he became a grocer's apprentice in Liverpool. After a seven-year apprenticeship, he was able to set up his own shop in nearby Birkenhead. His business was successful, and grew to a chain of six stores by the time he was 35. In 1859, he became a partner in the John Wright & Co. sugar refinery, selling his grocery business in 1861. By 1869, he had gained complete control of the company, and renamed it to Henry Tate & Sons. In 1872, he purchased the patent from Eugen Langen for making sugar cubes and built a new refinery in Liverpool. In 1877, he opened another refinery in the Silvertown district of London, which remains open; at the time, Silvertown was still mostly marshland. Tate used his industrial fortune to found the Tate Institute in Silvertown in 1887, and the Tate Gallery in Pimlico, Central London in 1897. He endowed the gallery with his own collection of Pre-Raphaelite paintings.

== Charity ==
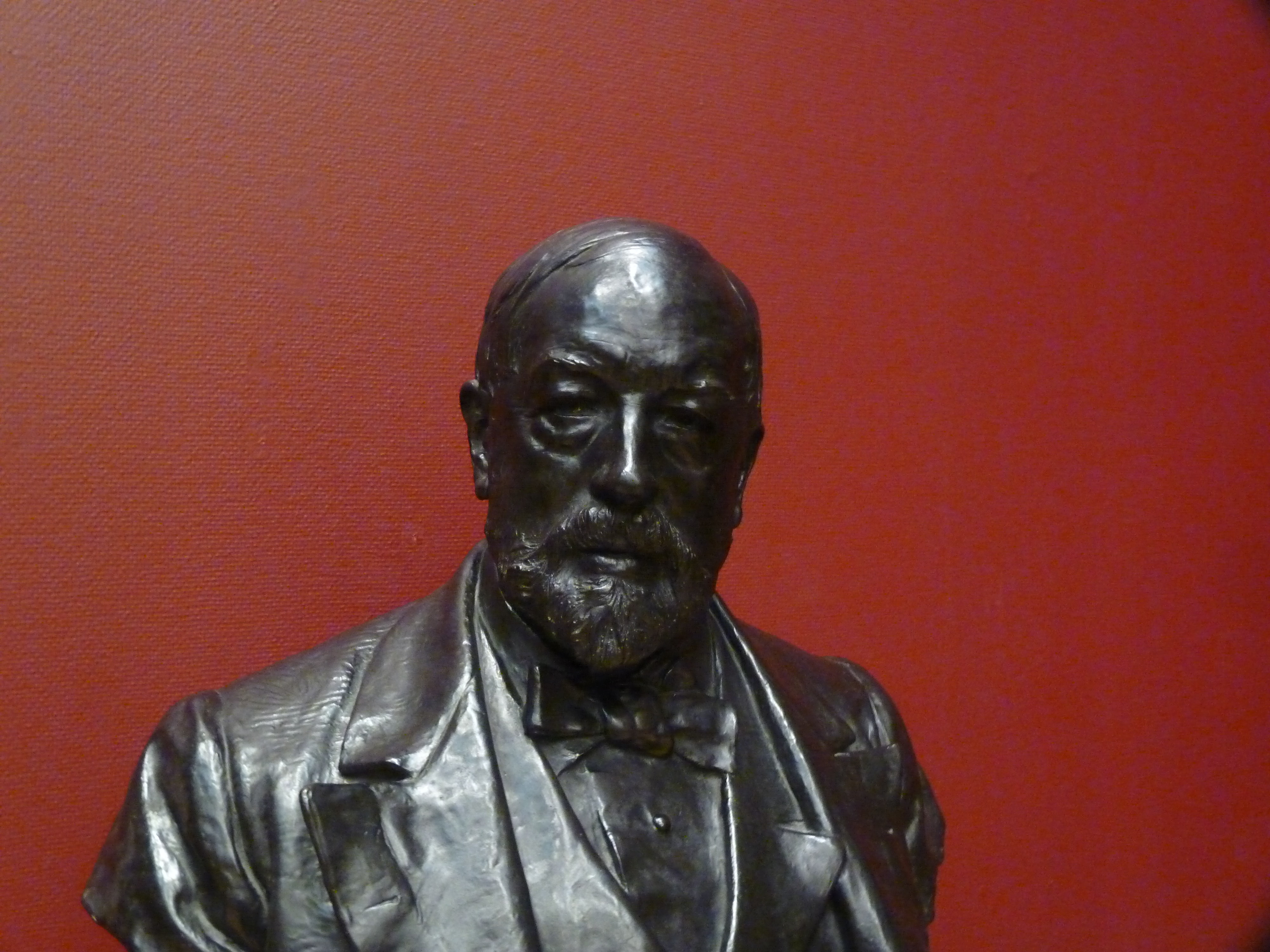
Bust of Tate by Thomas Brock at Tate Britain

Upon becoming wealthy, Tate donated generously to charity. In 1889, he donated his collection of 65 contemporary paintings to the British government, on the condition that they be displayed in a suitable gallery; he also donated £80,000 toward the construction of said gallery, which is now known as Tate Britain and opened on 21 July 1897 on the site of the old Millbank Prison.

Tate made many donations, often anonymously and always discreetly, and supported "alternative" and non-establishment causes. For example, he donated £10,000 for the library of what is now Oxford University's Harris Manchester College, though it was originally founded in Warrington in 1786 as a dissenting academy to provide religious nonconformists with higher education. He also gave the college £5,000 to promote the "theory and art of preaching". In addition, he gave £20,000 to the Liverpool Homeopathic Hospital in 1885. He particularly supported health and education with his money, giving £42,500 to Liverpool University, £3,500 to Bedford College for Women, and £5,000 to Streatham Library. In addition to Streatham, provisions were made for libraries in other areas of London such as Balham, Brixton, and South Lambeth. He gave £8,000 to the Liverpool Royal Infirmary and £5,000 to the Queen's Nursing Institute.

== Personal life ==
Tate had a reputation as a modest man who was often concerned with improving his workers' conditions, and had the Tate Institute built opposite his London refinery with a bar and dance hall for their recreation.

Tate married Jane Wignall in Liverpool on 1 March 1841. They lived at Park Hill near Streatham Common in London, had three sons together, and remained married until her death on 29 November 1883.

Tate married Amy Hislop at Christ Church, Lancaster Gate, in London on 8 October 1885.

Tate was made a baronet on 27 June 1898. He had refused this title more than once until—after he had spent £150,000 to build the Millbank Gallery, endowed it with his personal collection, and presented it to the nation—he was told the royal family would be offended if he refused again.

== Death ==
Tate died in Streatham on 5 December 1899 at the age of 80, and was buried in nearby West Norwood Cemetery, the gates of which are opposite a public library to which he donated. His home, Park Hill, later became a nunnery before it was refurbished as housing. In 1921, his company Henry Tate & Sons merged with Abram Lyle & Sons to form Tate & Lyle.

== Legacy ==
In 2001, a blue plaque commemorating Tate was unveiled on the site of his first shop at 42 Hamilton Street in Birkenhead.

In 2006, a Wetherspoons pub in Chorley was named after him.

== Gallery ==
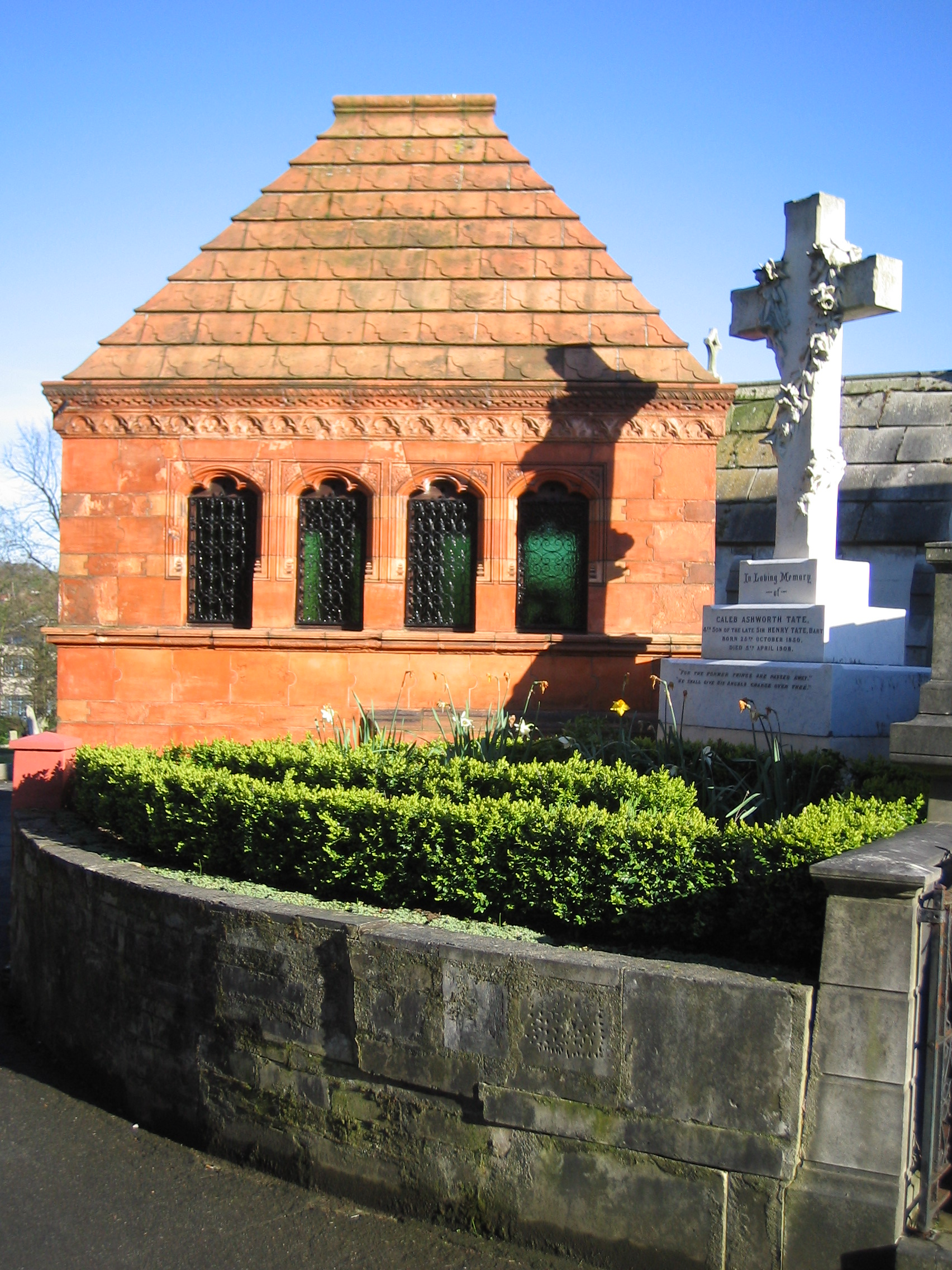
Tate's mausoleum at West Norwood Cemetery

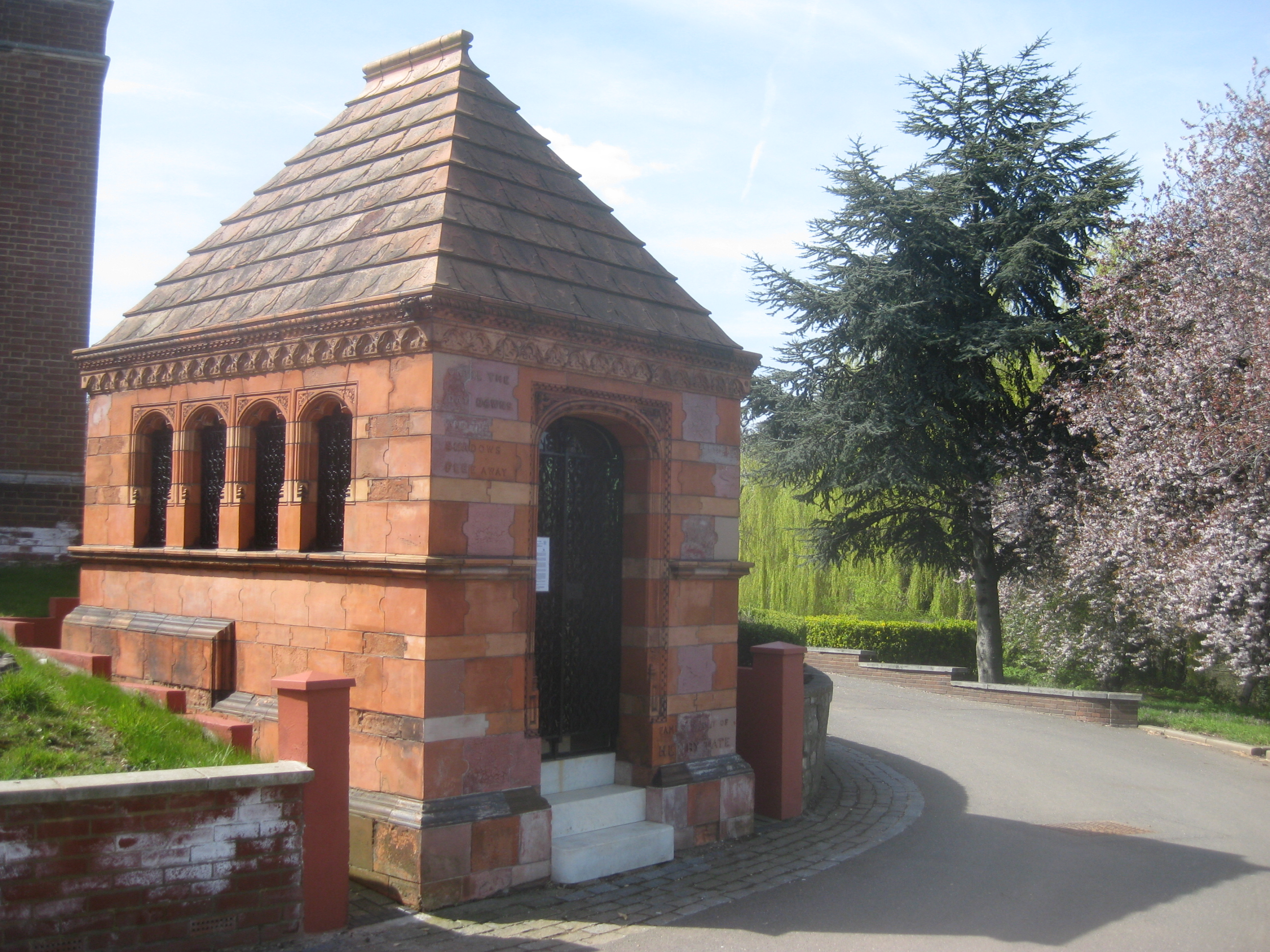
Tate's mausoleum at West Norwood Cemetery

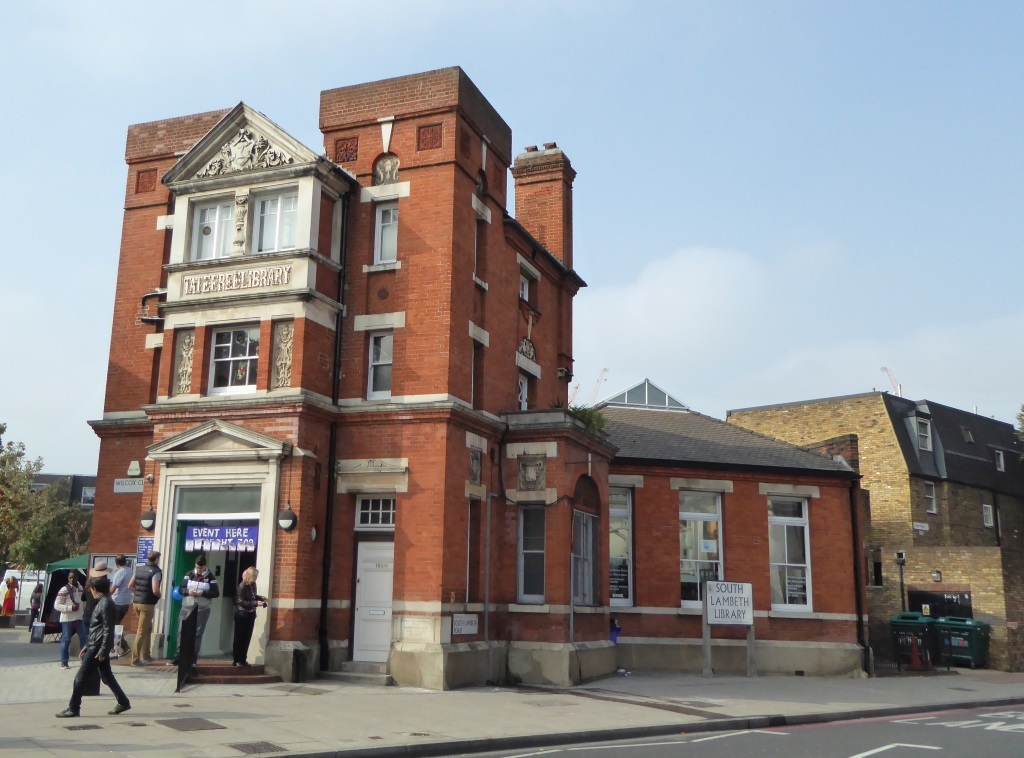
Tate South Lambeth Library in Vauxhall

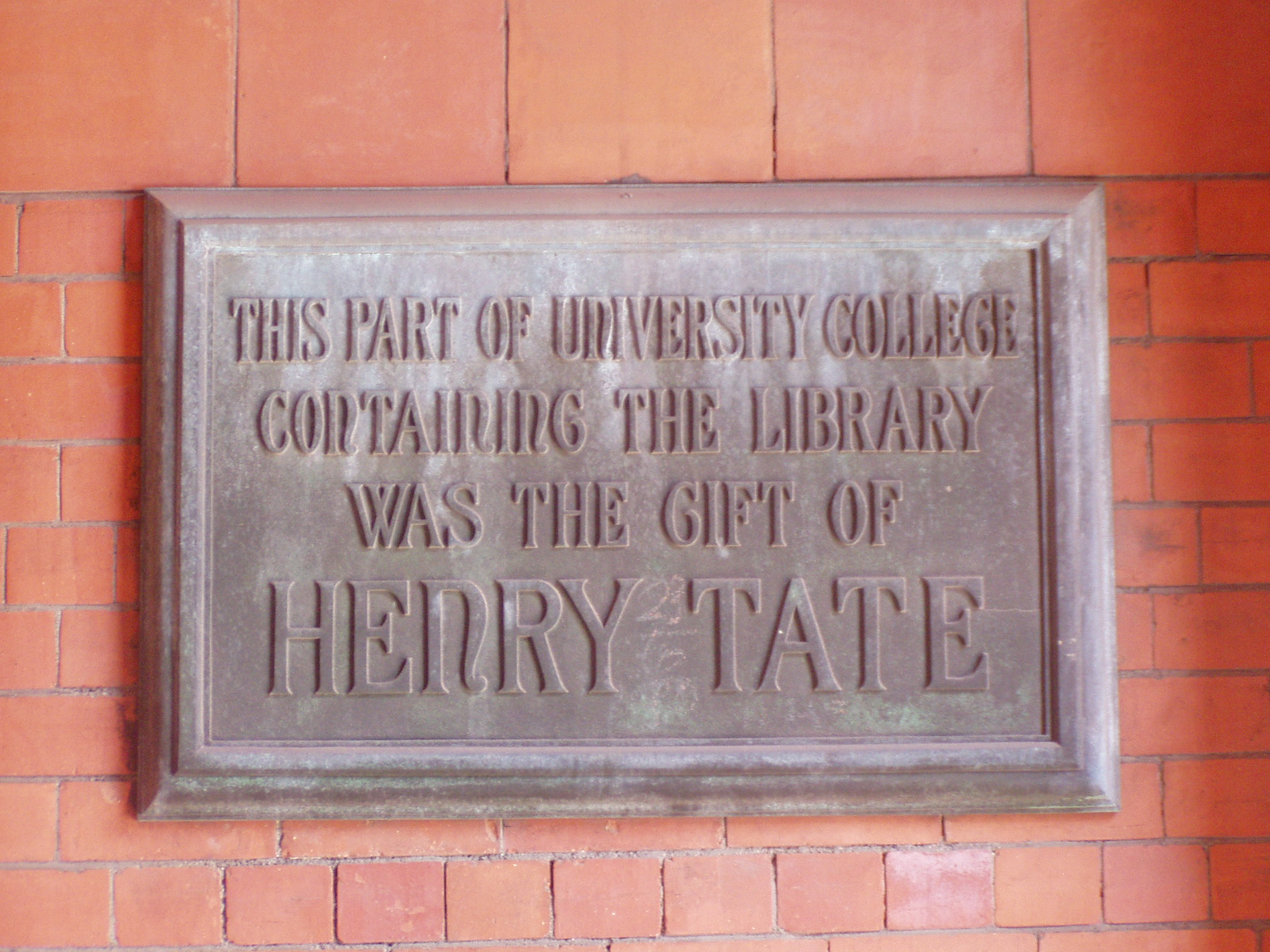
Dedication plaque to Tate in the University of Liverpool's Victoria Building

== Notes and references ==
- Ingman, Bruce (2014). Henry Tate. Tate Publishing. ISBN 978-1-84976-169-7.
- Chisholm, Hugh, ed. (1911). "Tate, Sir Henry" . Encyclopædia Britannica. Vol. 26 (11th ed.). Cambridge University Press. p. 449.
- Munting, Roger. "Tate, Sir Henry, first baronet (1819–1899)". Oxford Dictionary of National Biography (online ed.). Oxford University Press. doi:10.1093/ref:odnb/26984. (Subscription, Wikipedia Library access or UK public library membership required.)

Baronetage of the United Kingdom
New creation	Baronet (of Park Hill); 1898–1899	Succeeded by William Henry Tate
