= Statue of Henry Irving =

Statue in London by Thomas Brock

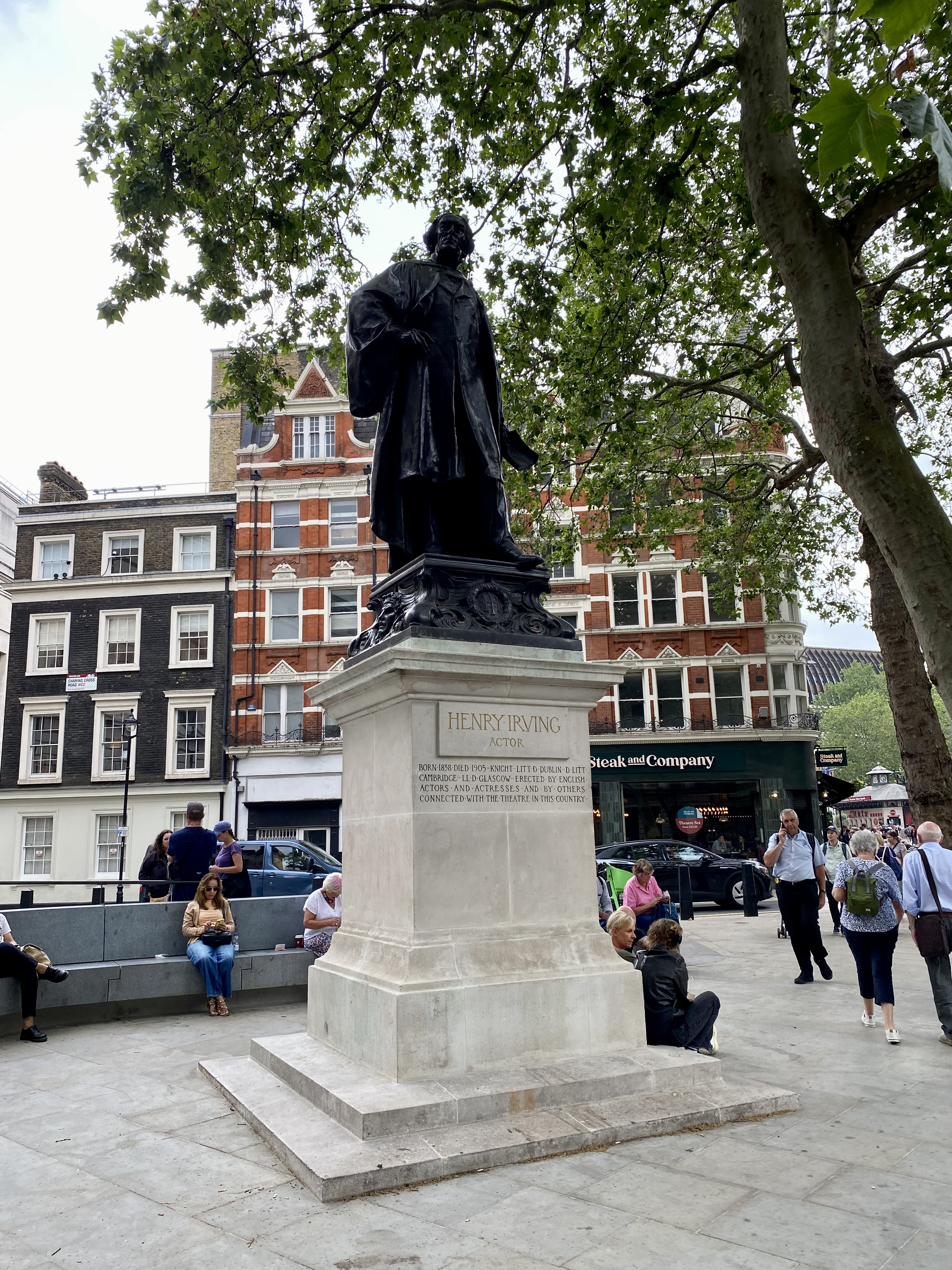
- The sculpture in 2023
- Artist: Thomas Brock
- Year: 1910
- Subject: Henry Irving
- Location: London, United Kingdom; 51°30′35″N 0°07′42″W

Listed Building – Grade II
- Official name: Statue of Sir Henry Irving
- Designated: 24 February 1958
- Reference no.: 1357292

A statue of Henry Irving stands near the entrance of the National Portrait Gallery in London. It was unveiled on 5 December 1910, having been funded by English actors and actresses and others related to British theatre in a campaign organised by the Irving Memorial Committee. It was installed on land donated by the City of Westminster. The Irving Society hosts a wreath-laying ceremony at the statue on 6 February each year, commemorating the actor's birth. The bronze statue, on a Portland stone pedestal, is by the sculptor Thomas Brock and is listed at Grade II.

The street between the statue and the National Portrait Gallery, formerly Green Street, was renamed Irving Street in the actor's honour in 1939, commemorating the centenary the previous year of Irving's birth in 1838. In 1951 formal gardens were laid out around the statue, with railings bearing the monogram HI, for the Festival of Britain; these were unveiled by Laurence Olivier.

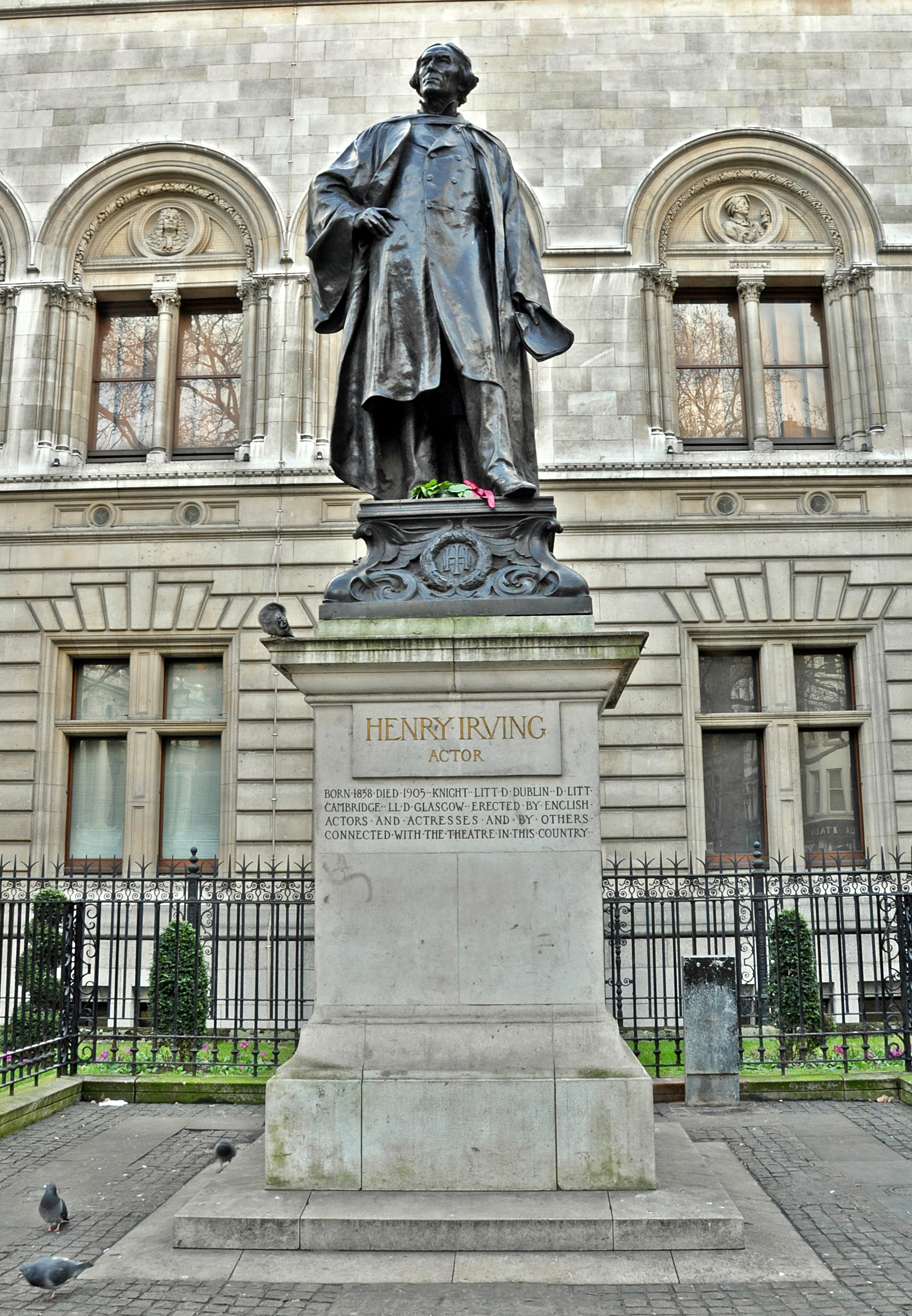
The statue in its original location, in 2012
