= William Lewis, 3rd Baron Merthyr =

British barrister and politician

Major William Brereton Couchman Lewis, 3rd Baron Merthyr, KBE, TD, PC (7 January 1901 – 16 April 1977), styled The Honourable William Lewis between 1914 and 1932, was a British barrister and politician.

Lewis was the son of Herbert Clark Lewis, 2nd Baron Merthyr, by Elizabeth Anna Couchman (d. 1925), eldest daughter of Major-General Richard Short Couchman. He succeeded his father in the barony in March 1932.

He served in the Second World War as a Major in the Pembroke Heavy Regiment of the British Army and was held as a prisoner of war in Hong Kong from 1941 to 1945. Following the war Lord Merthyr served as Chairman of the Committees in the House of Lords from 1957 to 1965 and as a Deputy Speaker from 1957 to 1974. In 1964, he was admitted to the Privy Council. He was also Chairman and Vice-President of the National Marriage Guidance Council, of the Magistrates' Association and of the Family Planning Association, as well as Honorary Treasurer of the National Society for the Prevention of Cruelty to Children and of the Royal Society for the Prevention of Cruelty to Animals.

Lord Merthyr married Violet Meyrick, the third daughter of Brigadier-General Sir Frederick Charlton Meyrick, 2nd Baronet, in 1932. He died in April 1977, aged 76, and was succeeded by his son Trevor, who immediately disclaimed the title. Lady Merthyr died in February 2003. Lord Merthyr's fourth son the Honourable Robin Lewis has been Lord Lieutenant of Dyfed since 2006.

== Arms ==
Coat of arms of William Lewis, 3rd Baron Merthyr
| Crest An eagle displayed Azure charged on the breast with a bee volant Or and holding in the beak a roll of paper Argent. Escutcheon Sable a lion rampant Argent over all a fess Or charged with three bees volant Proper. Supporters On either side a lion rampant Sable charged on the shoulder with a bezant thereon a bee volant Proper. Motto 1st Gwna A Ddylit Doed A Ddel 2nd Hirbarhad. |

Peerage of the United Kingdom
| Preceded by Herbert Clark Lewis | Baron Merthyr; 1932–1977 | Succeeded by Trevor Oswin Lewis |
