= Statue of Henry Bartle Frere =

Statue in London by Thomas Brock

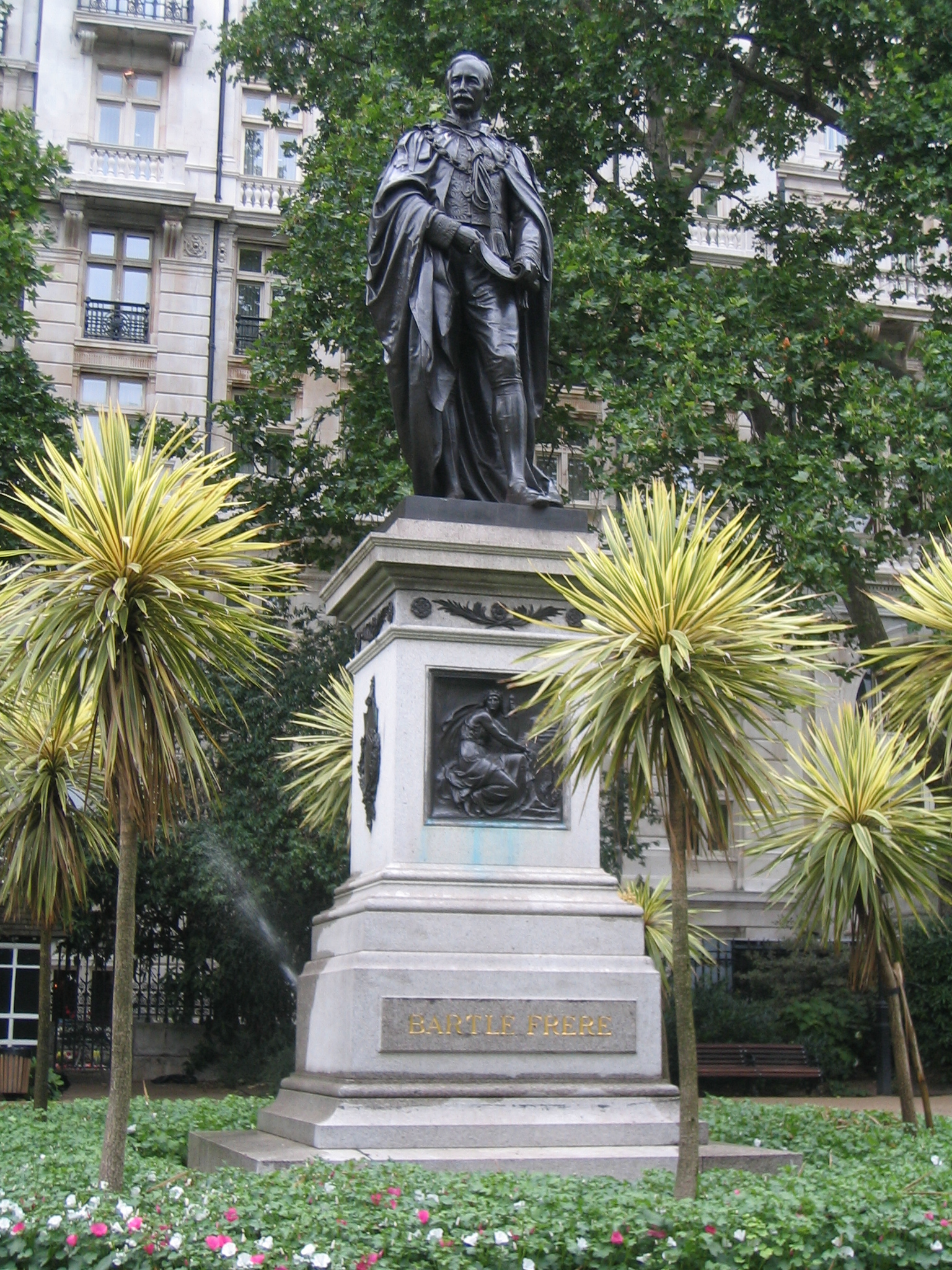
- The statue in 2005
- Artist: Thomas Brock
- Year: 1888
- Subject: Henry Bartle Frere
- Location: London, United Kingdom; 51.5057°N 0.1234°W

The statue of Henry Bartle Frere is an outdoor 1888 sculpture of the British colonial administrator of the same name, installed at Whitehall Gardens in London, United Kingdom. The statue is by the sculptor Thomas Brock and is Grade II listed.

== See also ==
- 1888 in art
- List of public art in the City of Westminster
