= Tate Institute =

Coordinates: 51.5024°N 0.047°E

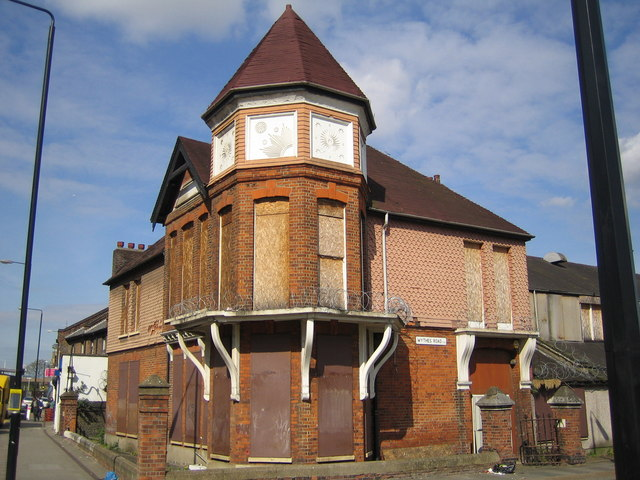
The abandoned Tate Institute building in 2007

The Tate Institute was a community facility established by Henry Tate in Silvertown in 1887.

The building was established to create an apolitical and non-sectarian environment. The Institute closed in 1933 and the building was used as a local library until 1961.

The building was then used as a social club with bar and snooker hall in use until the early 21st century when it was acquired by Newham Council.

In 2016 a group of artists took over the building establishing the "Craftory", to rehabilitate the building and create the “Silvertown ArtSpace” to provide a hub for a broad range of artistic and community activities.

In 2024 a project entitled REinsTate, overseen by the ReSpace Alliance, won a tender to refurbish the building and transform it into an active, affordable community hub.

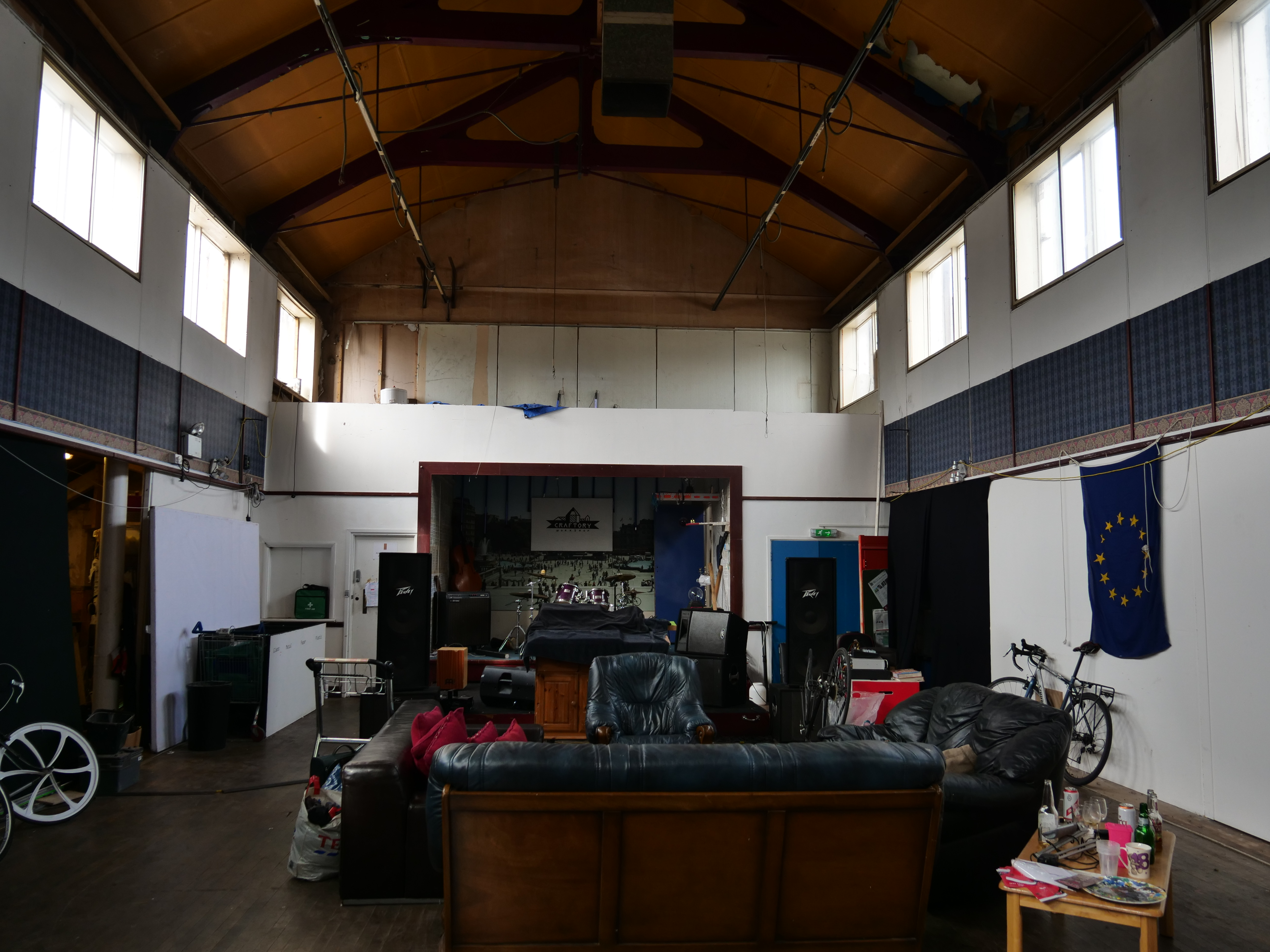
Craftory workshop looking north

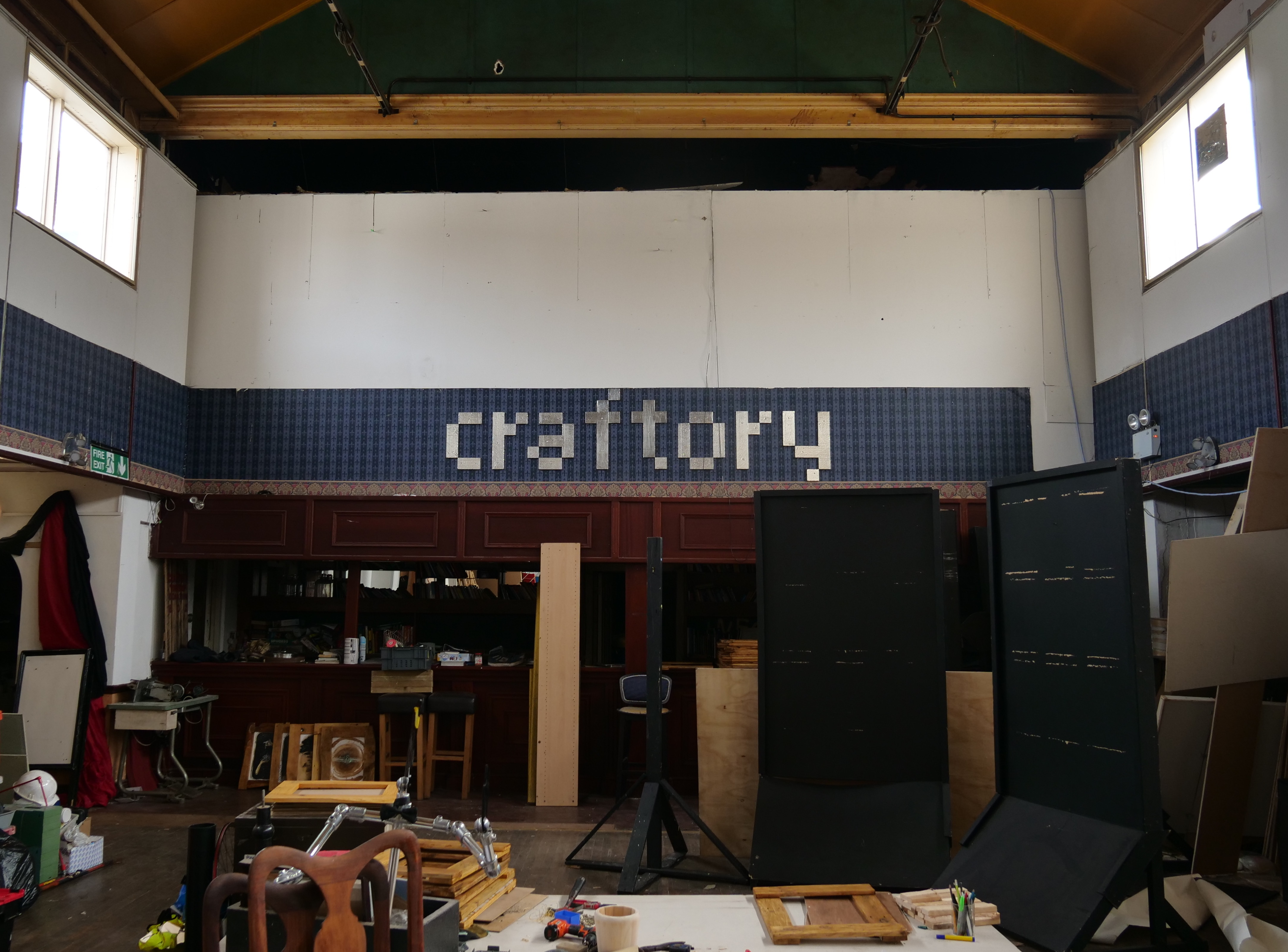
Craftory workshop looking south
