= Gorsedd stones =

Modern groups of standing stones in Wales

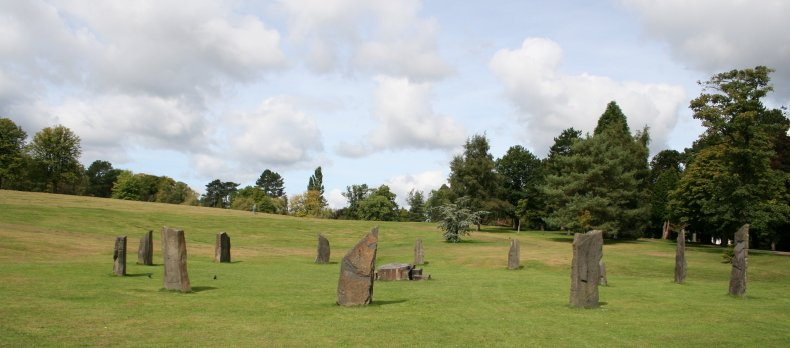
Gorsedd circle at Aberdare Park showing typical layout. The National Eisteddfod has been held in Aberdare three times, including the first in 1861

Gorsedd stones (Welsh: Cerrig yr Orsedd) are groups of standing stones constructed for the National Eisteddfod of Wales. They form an integral part of the druidic Gorsedd ceremonies of the Eisteddfod. The stones can be found as commemorative structures throughout Wales and are the hallmark of the National Eisteddfod having visited a community.

Each grouping of stones is arranged in a circular formation typically consisting of twelve stone pillars. Sometimes the stones are from the local area and sometimes they represent the Welsh counties, such as at Aberystwyth. A large, flat-topped stone, known as the Logan Stone, lies at the centre of the circle and serves as a platform.

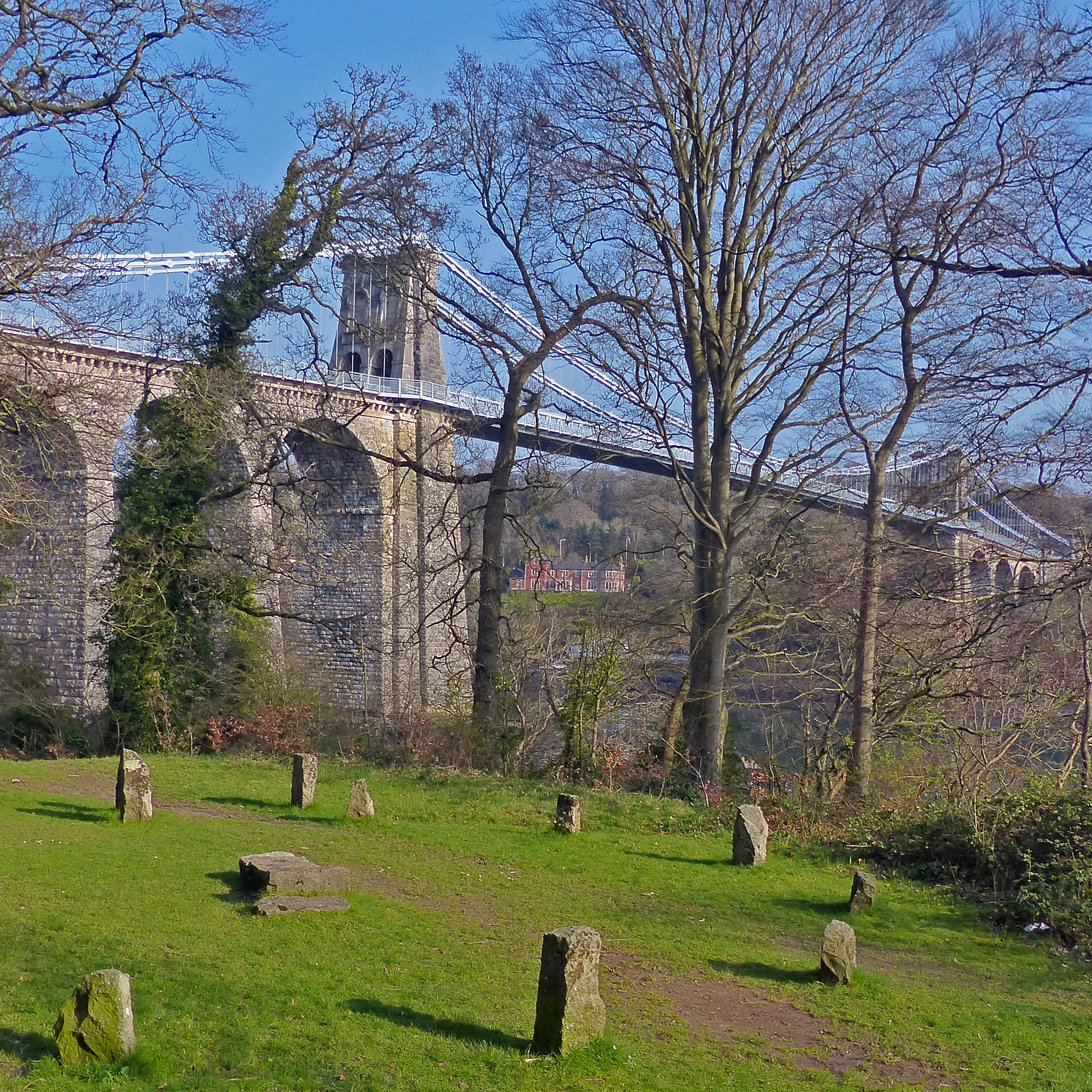
Gorsedd circle at Menai Bridge, Anglesey, with the Menai Suspension Bridge in the background

== Origins ==
An early Gorsedd was held by Iolo Morganwg at a location known as the "Rocking Stone" (in Welsh, "Y Maen Chwŷf") at Pentrebach, Pontypridd; Iolo, a stonemason by trade, constructed a stone circle around the central stone. Iolo had already held a similar ceremony in 1792 in London, also featuring a stone circle. It has been suggested that the "Gorse Stone", located on Stanton Moor in Derbyshire, has some connection with similar Druidic rituals of prehistoric times.

== Ceremonial function ==
As well as commemorating the National Eisteddfod, the Gorsedd stones continue to provide an important ceremonial venue for the proclamation of future National Eisteddfodau, which according to tradition must be completed one year and one day prior to its official opening. The ceremony is conducted by the Archdruid of the Gorsedd of Bards, who formally announces the particulars of the proposed venue.

During the proceedings the Archdruid stands upon the Logan Stone; facing him, to the east cardinal point, is the Stone of the Covenant where the Herald Bard stands, and behind this are the Portal Stones which are guarded by Eisteddfod officials. The portal stone to the right of the entrance points to midsummer sunrise, while that to the left indicates the midwinter sunrise.

Due to the size and scale of the Eisteddfod in recent times it has been held in private fields and farmland, so the stones which are used on the site of the Eisteddfod are now artificial plastic stones which are removed following the event. However they do still erect perminant stones in parks and public fields of a town near to the event (which the event is still named after). In cases where the Eisteddfod is revisiting the same location, they will not erect new stones.
