= William Lewis, 1st Baron Merthyr =

Welsh coal mining magnate

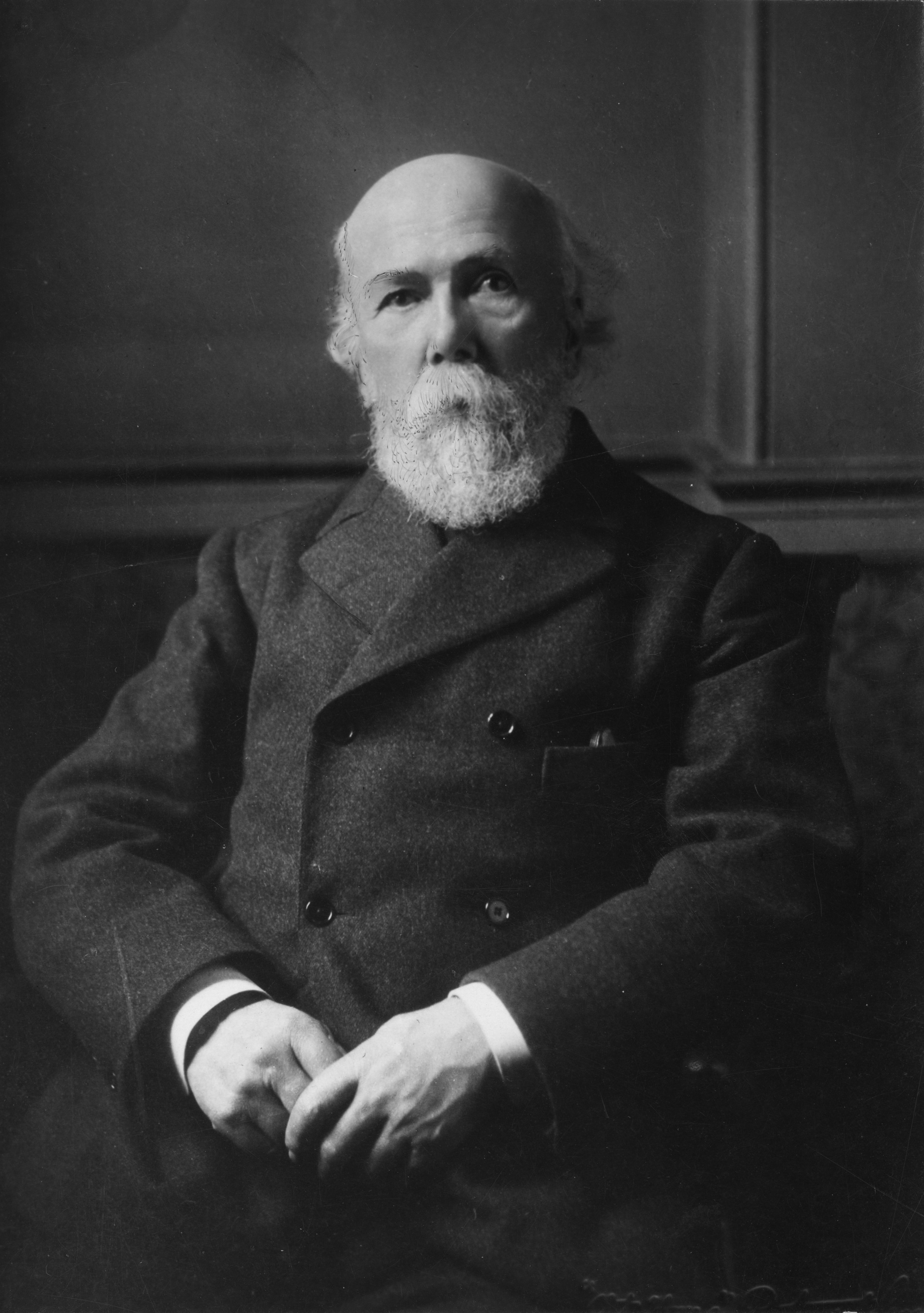
William Lewis, 1st Baron Merthyr

William Thomas Lewis, 1st Baron Merthyr GCVO JP DL (5 August 1837 – 27 August 1914), known as Sir William Lewis, 1st Baronet, from 1896 to 1911, was a Welsh coal mining magnate.

== Early life ==
Lewis was born in 1837 in Merthyr Tydfil, Glamorganshire, the second son of Thomas William Lewis, an engineer at the Plymouth, and his wife Mary Anne. He was educated at a local school run by Taliesin Williams until the age of thirteen when he was apprenticed to his father as an engineer.

In 1855 Lewis was appointed as an assistant to W. S. Clark, the chief mining engineer of John Crichton-Stuart, 3rd Marquess of Bute (1847–1890). He spent ten years in that post before succeeding Clark in 1864. Lewis was given the occupancy of Mardy House as part of his job, which became his long-term residence in Aberdare. The same year he married Anne Rees, daughter of William Rees, and granddaughter of Lucy Thomas, the legendary "mother of the Welsh steam-coal trade". Lewis and Anne had two sons and six daughters.

He at first worked for the Bute coal mining pits in southern Wales, but between 1870 and 1880 he acquired his own pits in Rhondda, which became known as Lewis Merthyr Consolidated Collieries Limited. He was also the founder of the Monmouthshire and South Wales Coal Association as a response to the growing strength of the trade unions.

== Public life ==
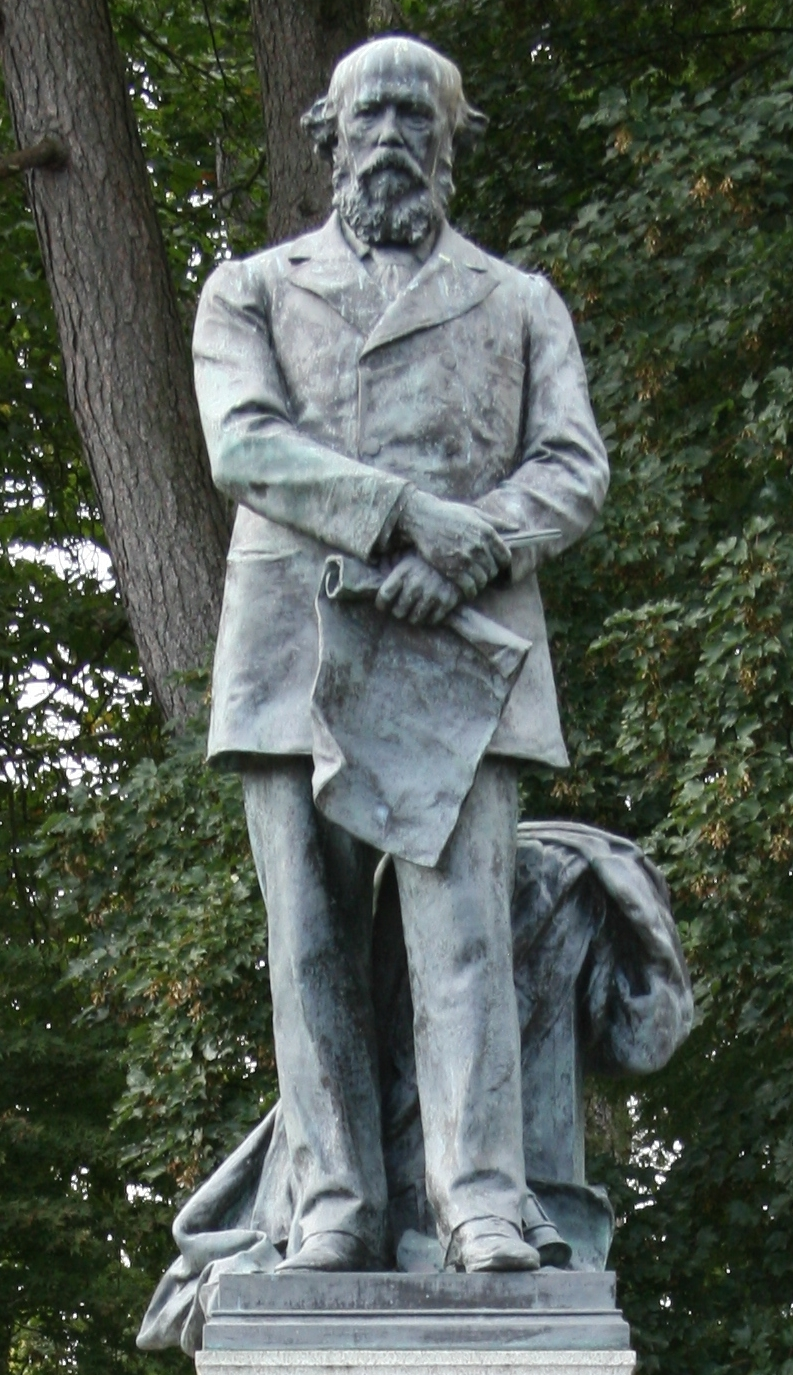
Sculpture by Thomas Brock at Aberdare Park

Lewis commenced his career in public life in 1866, when he was elected to the Aberdare Local Board of Health.

In 1889 he was stood for election to the Glamorgan County Council for the Hirwaun ward. The contest was marked by accusations (originally made at the time of the Glamorgan county election of 1880) that Lewis, as a prominent coal owner and land agent, had refused requests by Nonconformists for land to build chapels. He publicly refuted these allegations, at a meeting held at Ebenezer, Trecynon. Lewis's supporters also countered these claims by publishing old correspondence, including a letter by the late Thomas Price which refuted the accusations. There is evidence that Lewis's personal popularity transcended any political considerations. Lewis defeated the Liberal candidate, a local Methodist minister, Richard Morgan, and was immediately made an alderman. At the end of his six-year term he did not seek re-election.

== Later career ==
Lewis was created a Baronet, of Nantgwyne, in 1896, and in 1911 he was raised to the peerage as Baron Merthyr, of Senghenydd in the County of Glamorgan. He was Knighted in 1885. He was Knighted as a Knight Commander of the Royal Victoria Order (KCVO) in 1907. He was upgraded to Knight Grand Cross (GCVO) in 1912. He served as high sheriff of Brecknockshire in 1884. He was awarded the Freedom of the City of Cardiff on 10 March 1905.

Lady Lewis died at Hean Castle, Saundersfoot, on 2 October 1902. Lord Merthyr died in August 1914, aged 77, and was succeeded in his titles by his eldest son Herbert.

A sculpture by Thomas Brock was erected in Aberdare Park and unveiled in 1913.

== Senghenydd colliery disaster ==
One of the pits owned by Lewis was the Senghenydd Colliery. Following a failure to implement a safety plan in early 1913, an explosion in the mine on 14 October of that year killed 439 miners and one rescuer. This remains the worst mining accident in the United Kingdom. Lord Merthyr, together with the colliery manager, was subsequently fined a total of £24.

== Arms ==
Coat of arms of William Lewis, 1st Baron Merthyr
| Crest An eagle displayed Azure charged on the breast with a bee volant Or and holding in the beak a roll of paper Argent. Escutcheon Sable a lion rampant Argent over all a fess Or charged with three bees volant Proper. Supporters On either side a lion rampant Sable charged on the shoulder with a bezant thereon a bee volant Proper. Motto 1st Gwna A Ddylit Doed A Ddel 2nd Hirbarhad. |

Peerage of the United Kingdom
| New creation | Baron Merthyr; 1911–1914 | Succeeded by Herbert Lewis |
Baronetage of the United Kingdom
| New creation | Baronet (of Nantgwyne); 1896–1914 | Succeeded by Herbert Lewis |

== Bibliography ==
- Kidd, Charles, Williamson, David (editors). Debrett's Peerage and Baronetage (1990 edition). New York: St Martin's Press, 1990.
- Williams, John (2004). "Lewis, William Thomas, first Baron Merthyr (1837–1914)". Oxford Dictionary of National Biography (online ed.). Oxford University Press. doi:10.1093/ref:odnb/47974. (Subscription, Wikipedia Library access or UK public library membership required.)
- Short summary of Lord Merthyr's career at www.archivesnetworkwales.co.uk
