= Juliet Dymoke =

English historical novelist

Juliet Dymoke was the pseudonym of the English historical novelist Juliet Dymoke de Schanschieff (28 June 1919 – 2001).

== Biography ==
She was born in Enfield, and attended the Chantry Mount School at Bishop's Stortford. In 1942, she married Hugo de Schanschieff, an RAF officer whom she met while working for Canadian Army Medical Records. The couple had one son and one daughter. Her first novels were published in the UK in the 1950s: Sons of the Tribune came out in 1956. In 1958, she brought out London in the 18th century, a school textbook published by Jarrolds in the "Then & There" series.

Dymoke's novels are set in various historical periods. One of her earliest publications, Treason in November (1961), deals with events surrounding the Gunpowder Plot of 1605.

Her best-known work is the Plantagenets series, six novels covering the period from the reign of King Henry II of England to that of King Richard III of England; these were published between 1978 and 1980. Although she wrote primarily for adults, her novels were also considered suitable for younger readers.

== Bibliography ==
=== Conqueror Trilogy ===
- Of the Ring of Earls (1970)
- Henry of the High Rock (1971)
- The Lion's Legacy (1974)

==== Related works ====
- Shadows on a Throne (1976)

=== Plantagenets Series ===
- A Pride of Kings (1978)
- The Royal Griffin (1978)
- The Lion of Mortimer (1979)
- Lady of the Garter (1979)
- The Lord of Greenwich (1980)
- The Sun in Splendour (1980)

=== Blood of Culloden ===
- The White Cockade (1979)
- Portrait of Jenny (1990)

=== Revolution ===
- The Queen's Diamond (1985)
- Two Flags for France (1986)

=== Hollander Trilogy ===
- Hollanders House (1991)
- Cry of the Peacock (1992)
- Winter's Daughter (1993)

=== Other Novels ===
- The Sons of the Tribune (1956) – illustrated by John Harris
- The Orange Sash (1958)
- Born for Victory ( 1960)
- Treason in November (1961)
- Bend Sinister (1962)
- The Cloisterman (1969)
- A Serpent in Eden (1973)
- Prisoner of Rome (1975) – illustrated by Frances Philips
- A Kind of Warfare (1981)
- Aboard the Mary Rose (1985)
- March to Corunna (1985)
- The Spanish Boy (1987) – illustrated by Jackie Cargin
- A Border Knight (1987)
- Ride to Glencoe (1989)
- A Fragile Marriage (1995)
- The Making of Molly March (1996)
- Cassie's Captain (1997)

=== Non-Fiction ===
- London in the Eighteenth Century (1958) – illustrated by G. Fry
