= Thomas Brock =

British artist (1847–1922)

Sir Thomas Brock KCB RA
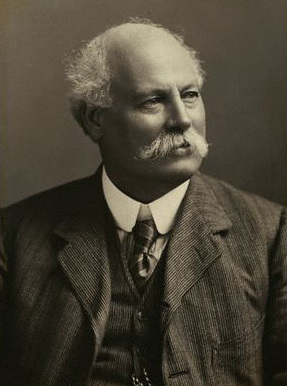
- Born: 1 March 1847; Worcester, England
- Died: 22 August 1922 (aged 75); London, England
- Resting place: Mayfield, East Sussex
- Education: School of Design, Worcester; Royal Academy Schools
- Known for: Sculpture, coin design
- Notable work: Victoria Memorial

Sir Thomas Brock KCB RA (1 March 1847 – 22 August 1922) was an English sculptor and medallist, notable for the creation of several large public sculptures and monuments in Britain and abroad in the late nineteenth and early twentieth centuries. Marjorie Trusted describes him as "the undisputed leading British sculptor of his day". His most famous work is the Victoria Memorial in front of Buckingham Palace, London. Other commissions included the redesign of the effigy of Queen Victoria on British coinage, the massive bronze equestrian statue of Edward, the Black Prince, in City Square, Leeds and the completion of the statue of Prince Albert on the Albert Memorial.

== Biography ==
Brock was born on 1 March 1847 in Worcester. He was the only son of a painter and decorator and attended the Government School of Design in Worcester, after which he undertook an apprenticeship in modelling at the Worcester Royal Porcelain Works. In 1866 he became a pupil of the sculptor John Henry Foley and also enrolled in the Royal Academy Schools, where he won a gold medal for sculpture in 1869. He met and befriended Frederic, Lord Leighton, whose emphasis on realism and naturalism in sculpture led Brock to become part of the New Sculpture movement and to develop his talent for sympathetic and realistic portraiture. After Foley's sudden death in 1874, Brock finished several of his commissions, including the monument to Daniel O'Connell in Dublin and a large bronze equestrian statue of Lord Canning for Kolkata. It was his completion of Foley's statue of Prince Albert for the Albert Memorial which first brought Brock to prominence and secured his position as an establishment sculptor. He also assisted in the casting of Lord Leighton's greatly influential 1877 sculpture An Athlete Wrestling with a Python.

Brock was elected an associate of the Royal Academy in 1883 and became a full member in 1891. He was a founding member, and the first president, of the Society of British Sculptors.

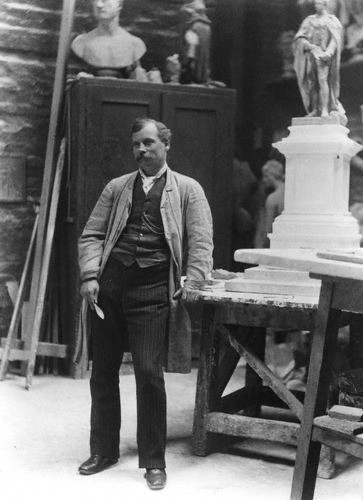
Thomas Brock in his studio, 1889

Brock's group The Moment of Peril (now in the garden of Leighton House) was followed by The Genius of Poetry, at the Carlsberg Brewery in Copenhagen. A plaster model for Eve was shown at the Royal Academy in 1898; a marble version (1900) is in the collection of the Tate and Brock also cast some smaller bronze replicas and other imaginative works that mark his development. His portrait works include busts, such as those of Lord Leighton and Queen Victoria, statues, such as Sir Richard Owen and Henry Philpott, bishop of Worcester, and sepulchral monuments such as that of Lord Leighton in St Paul's Cathedral.

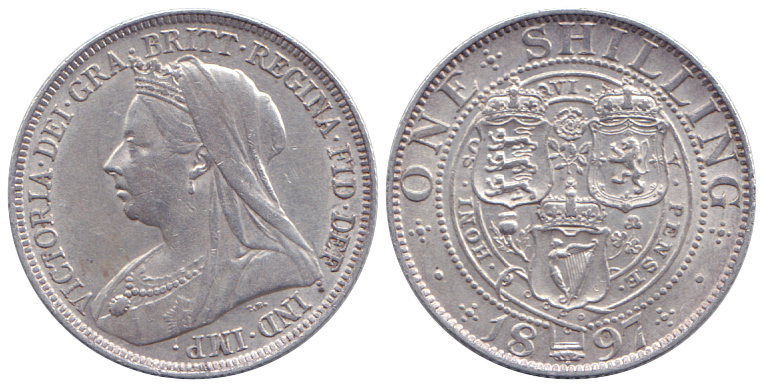
1897 shilling, obverse portrait of Queen Victoria by Thomas Brock.

Brock made statues of Victoria to celebrate her golden and diamond jubilees and also designed the depiction of her "veiled" or "widowed" head, used on all gold, silver and bronze coinage between 1893 and 1901.

In 1901 Brock won the commission to make a colossal equestrian statue of Edward the Black Prince for Leeds City Square. The same year, he was given perhaps his most significant commission, the vast multi-figure Imperial Memorial to Queen Victoria, to be erected in front of Buckingham Palace. The unveiling of this memorial took place on 16 May 1911, and according to legend King George V was so moved by the excellence of the memorial that he called for a sword and knighted Brock on the spot. In any event, it was on the same day that the Lord Chamberlain’s Office notified The London Gazette that the king had ordered that Brock be appointed a Knight Commander of the Order of the Bath.

From 1914 to 1919 Brock returned to the post of president of the Society of British Sculptors.

Brock married in 1869 and had eight children. He died in London on 22 August 1922. He was buried at Mayfield, East Sussex (his home since 1905), in the churchyard of St Dunstan's church, where his family commissioned as a monument a granite and marble tomb chest, modelled on the one he had shortly before designed for Captain Charles Grant Seely at Gatcombe, Isle of Wight.

== Public monuments ==
=== 1875–1889 ===
Image	Title / subject	Location and coordinates	Date	Type	Material	Dimensions	Designation	Wikidata	Notes
More images	Richard Baxter	St Mary's, Kidderminster	1875	Statue on pedestal	Marble and granite		Grade II	Q26392189	Originally in the Bull Ring, Kidderminster and moved to its present site in March 1967.
More images	William Rathbone V	Sefton Park, Liverpool	1877	Statue on pedestal with plaques	Portland stone & bronze		Grade II	Q26333129	Statue by John Henry Foley, pedestal by Brock
More images	A Moment of Peril	Rosenborg Castle Gardens, Copenhagen, Denmark	1880	Sculpture group	Bronze			Q57542450	Replica of the original in the gardens of the Leighton House Museum in London.
More images	Statue of Robert Raikes	Victoria Embankment Gardens, London	1880	Statue on pedestal	Bronze and stone		Grade II	Q19967451	
More images	Sir Rowland Hill	Vicar Street, Kidderminster	1881	Statue on circular pedestal	Marble and granite		Grade II	Q26392153	
	Sir Richard Temple, 1st Baronet	Dr. Bhau Daji Lad Museum, Mumbai	1884	Statue	Marble				Moved in 1965 from north end of Oval, Mumbai
More images	Henry Wadsworth Longfellow	Poets' Corner, Westminster Abbey, London	1884	Bust	Marble				
More images	William Menelaus	National Museum Cardiff	1884	Bust	Marble	72.4cm			
More images	Colin Minton Campbell	London Road, Stoke-on-Trent	1887	Statue on pedestal	Bronze and stone	5.05m high			
More images	Queen Victoria	Shire Hall, Worcester	1887	Statue on pedestal	Marble and granite		Grade II	Q26669257	
More images	Statue of Henry Bartle Frere	Whitehall Gardens, London	1888	Statue on pedestal	Bronze and granite	3.4m tall	Grade II	Q21286428	

=== 1890–1899 ===
Image	Title / subject	Location and coordinates	Date	Type	Material	Dimensions	Designation	Wikidata	Notes
More images	Queen Victoria	Houses of Parliament, Cape Town, South Africa	1890	Statue on pedestal	Granite pedestal			Q20614583	
More images	Daniel O'Connell	St Patrick's Cathedral, Melbourne, Australia	Erected 1891	Statue on pedestal	Bronze				
More images	Bishop Henry Philpott	Worcester Cathedral	1892	Seated statue on pedestal	Marble and stone				
More images	James Douglas, Earl of Angus	Douglas, South Lanarkshire	1892	Statue on pedestal	Bronze		Category A	Q17568868	
More images	Lord Arthur Hervey	Wells Cathedral	post-1894	Chest tomb with effigy & putti	Marble and stone		Grade I		
	Richard Owen	Natural History Museum, London	1896	Statue on pedestal	Bronze and marble				
More images	Memorial to Sir Augustus Harris	Catherine St. facade of Theatre Royal, Drury Lane	1897	Wall mounted drinking fountain and sculpture	Granite and bronze		Grade I		Memorial architect: Sidney R. J. Smith
More images	William Lewis, 1st Baron Merthyr	Upper Thomas Street, Merthyr Tydfil	1898	Statue on pedestal	Bronze and granite		Grade II	Q29489929	
More images	Henry Tate	Tate Britain	1898	Bust	Bronze	533 x 584 x 356mm			
More images	Thomas Hughes	Rugby School	1899	Statue on pedestal					

=== 1900–1909 ===
Image	Title / subject	Location and coordinates	Date	Type	Material	Dimensions	Designation	Wikidata	Notes
More images	Queen Victoria	Victoria Square, Birmingham	1901, recast 1951	Statue on pedestal	Bronze and stone			Q47460184	Recast by William Bloye from Brock's original marble statue in 1951
More images	Statue of Queen Victoria	Grand Avenue, Hove	Unveiled 1901	Statue on pedestal	Bronze and marble		Grade II	Q26482744	
More images	Lord Frederic Leighton memorial	St Paul's Cathedral, London	1902	Effigy on pedestal & plinth with supporting figures	Bronze and coloured marbles				
More images	Queen Victoria	Carlton House Terrace, London	Unveiled 1902, relocated 1971	Statue	Marble	1.9m tall		Q19927909	
More images	Queen Victoria	Bitts Park, Carlisle	1902	Statue on pedestal & steps	Bronze and granite		Grade II	Q26513391	
	Royal Scots Fusiliers memorial	Burns Statue Square, Ayr	1902	Statue on pedestal	Bronze and granite		Category B	Q17834558	
More images	Edward, the Black Prince	Leeds City Square	1903	Equestrian statue on pedestal	Bronze and granite		Grade II*	Q17533834	
More images	Queen Victoria	Belfast City Hall.	1903	Statue on pedestal and steps with sculptures	Marble, Portland stone, bronze		Grade A	Q17778520	
More images	Edward James Harland	Belfast City Hall	1903	Statue on pedestal	Stone		Grade B1	Q17778453	
More images	William Ewart Gladstone	St John's Gardens, Liverpool	1904	Statue on pedestal, relief panel with 2 statues at base	Bronze		Grade II	Q26333153	
More images	William Ewart Gladstone	North transept, Westminster Abbey, London	1904	Statue on pedestal	Marble				
More images	Sir John Everett Millais	Tate Britain, London	1905	Statue on pedestal	Bronze and Portland stone	6.7m tall	Grade II	Q27080819	
More images	Sir Henry Tate	Brixton Oval, London	1905	Bust on pedestal	Bronze and stone		Grade II	Q27087718	
More images	Statue of Queen Victoria	Queen's Park, Bangalore	1906	Statue on pedestal	Marble and sandstone			Q22116770	
More images	Queen Victoria	Queens Gardens, Brisbane, Australia	1906	Statue on pedestal	Bronze and stone				
More images	General John Nicholson	Royal School Dungannon, County Tyrone	1906	Statue on pedestal	Bronze and stone		Grade B+	Q17861889	Originally erected in Kolkata, moved to Delhi then relocated to Dungannon in 1960.

=== 1910–1919 ===
Image	Title / subject	Location and coordinates	Date	Type	Material	Dimensions	Designation	Wikidata	Notes
More images	Statue of Sir Henry Irving	Charing Cross Road, London	1910	Statue on pedestal	Bronze and Portland stone		Grade II	Q18162015	
	Edward VII	King Edward VII Galleries, British Museum	1911	Bust	Gilded bronze	77cm by 78.3cm			Marble copy in Buckingham Palace
More images	Victoria Memorial, London	The Mall, London	Unveiled 1911, completed 1924	Sculpture on pillar with statues and fountains	Marble, bronze, Portland stone		Grade I	Q1333411	
More images	William Lewis, 1st Baron Merthyr	Aberdare Park, Aberdare	1913	Statue on pedestal	Bronze and granite		Grade II	Q29489480	
More images	Navigation	Admiralty Arch, London	1908–1913	Wall-mounted statue	Portland stone		Grade I		
More images	Gunnery	Admiralty Arch, London	1908–1913	Wall-mounted statue	Portland stone		Grade I		
More images	Statue of Captain James Cook	The Mall, London	1914	Statue on pedestal	Bronze and Portland stone		Grade II	Q17514442	
	Joseph Lister	Westminster Abbey, London	1915	Portrait medallion	Marble				
More images	Edward VII	Queen's Park, Toronto	1919	Equestrian statue on pedestal	Bronze and stone			Q122417547	Originally erected in Delhi, India, relocated to Canada in 1969 as a gift of the government of India.

=== 1920 and later ===
Image	Title / subject	Location and coordinates	Date	Type	Material	Dimensions	Designation	Wikidata	Notes
More images	Titanic Memorial, Belfast	Belfast City Hall	1920	Statue group on pedestal	Stone			Q7809806	
More images	Edward VII	Macquarie Street, Sydney, Australia	1921	Equestrian statue on pedestal	Bronze and stone				Brock won the commission in 1915, but the work was not finished and delivered until 1921.
More images	Queen Victoria	Victoria Memorial, Kolkata, India	1921	Statue on pedestal	Marble			Q92360284	Completed 1917, unveiled 1921
More images	Captain Charles Grant Seely	St Olave's Church, Gatcombe, Isle of Wight.	1922	Sculpture on box tomb	Marble and stone			Q93239404	Brock's final completed work.
More images	Memorial to Joseph Lister	Portland Place, London	1924	Bust on column with sculptures	Bronze and granite		Grade II	Q21541736	
More images	War memorial	Queen's University, Belfast	1924	Statue group on pedestal	Bronze and granite			Q66459168	
More images	Joseph Lister	National Portrait Gallery, London	1927	Bust	Bronze				Cast 1927 from a 1912–13 plaster work.
More images	Robert Raikes	Gloucester	1930	Statue on pedestal	Bronze and stone				A copy of Brock's 1880 statue in London

=== Other works ===
- Equestrian bronze A Moment of Peril, 1880, now in the collection of Tate Britain.
- Marble statue on a pedestal of Sorabjee Shapurjee Bengallee, 1898, south-east corner of the Oval, Fort, Mumbai
- The Victoria and Albert Museum in London holds several bronze castings made from the original 1901 clay models of the Victoria Memorial plus later, small-scale, versions of the supporting groups that differ from those on the completed monument.
- Marble bust for India of Darasha Ruttonjee Chichgur, 1903, current location unknown
- Bronze statue of Queen Victoria, erected 1904 at Cawnpore and now in the Uttar Pradesh State Museum, Lucknow. Thought to be a cast of the design Brock used for his statues of the Queen at Agra, Hove, Brisbane and Carlise.
- Statue of Queen Victoria, Agra, 1905, removed to storage in Mathura after the 1947 independence of India. The statue was originally on a pedestal with bronze figures of Truth and Justice at the base and located on a marble platform in an ornamental lake. The supporting figures are now missing.
- Marble bust of Sir Cowasjee Jehangir, 1915, Jehangir Public Hall, India
- Marble seated statue on a pedestal of Dinshaw Maneckji Petit, shown at the Royal Academy in 1916 and subsequently erected near the Victoria Terminus in Mumbai
- Statue of George Clarke, 1st Baron Sydenham of Combe, erected 1919, inside the entrance to the Science Institute College, Mumbai
- Statue of Thomas Gainsborough at the Royal Academy in Burlington House, London.
- Bust of Henry Lee, in the hall of the Royal College of Surgeons, London
- Busts of Henry W. Longfellow at Grand Pre, Nova Scotia
- Busts of Michael Faraday and Frederic Leighton in the collection of the National Portrait Gallery in London.

== Legacy ==
From 1877 until his death, Brock had his London studio in Osnaburgh Street, near Regent's Park. Brock Street, a short distance to the east, is named after him.

== See also ==
- List of statues of Queen Victoria (13 of the entries are by Brock)

Preceded by Joseph Edgar Boehm	Coins of the pound sterling Obverse sculptor 1892	Succeeded by George William de Saulles
