= Aberdare Park =

Public park in South Wales

Coordinates: 51°43′09″N 3°27′30″W

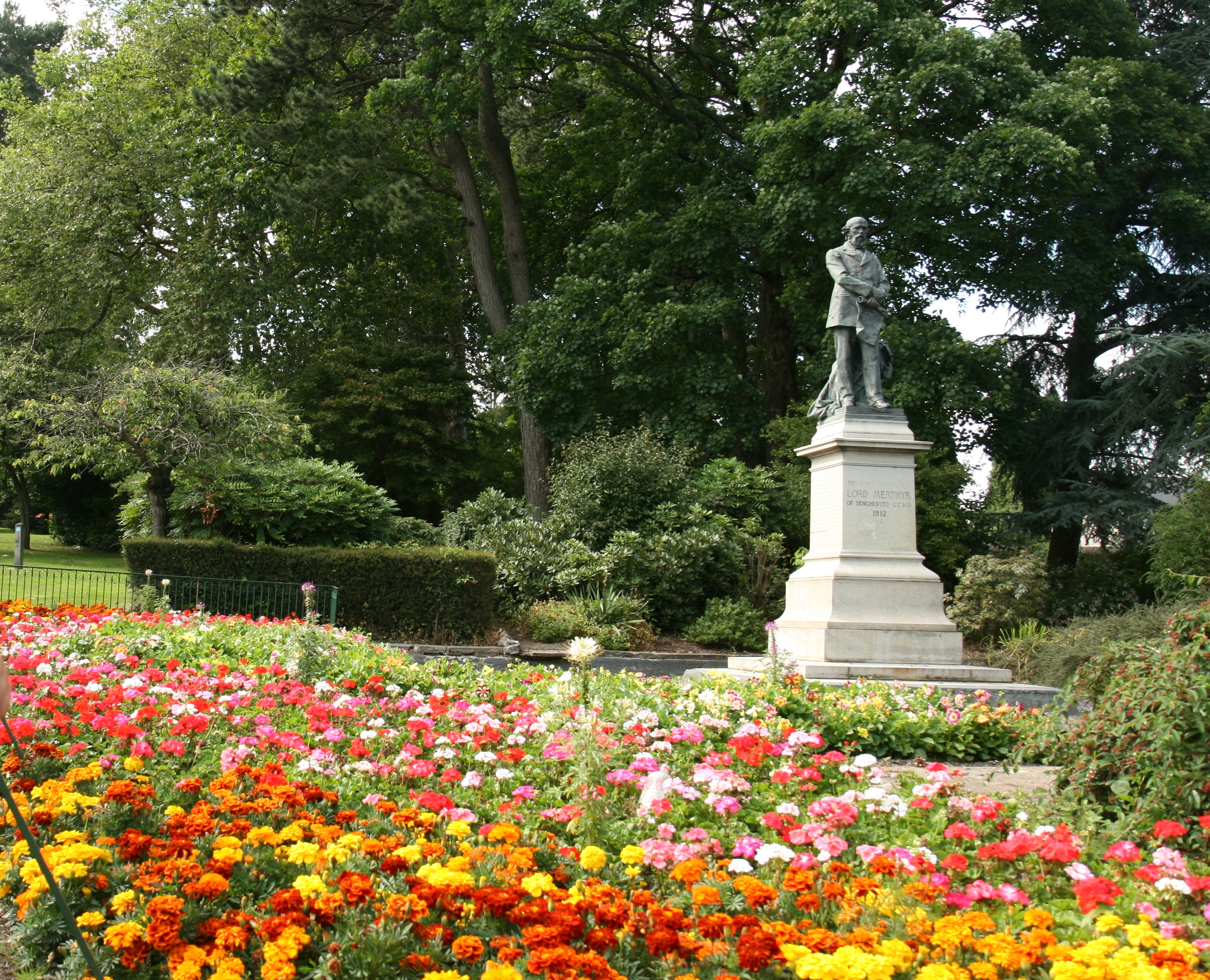
Sculpture of Lord Merthyr by Thomas Brock

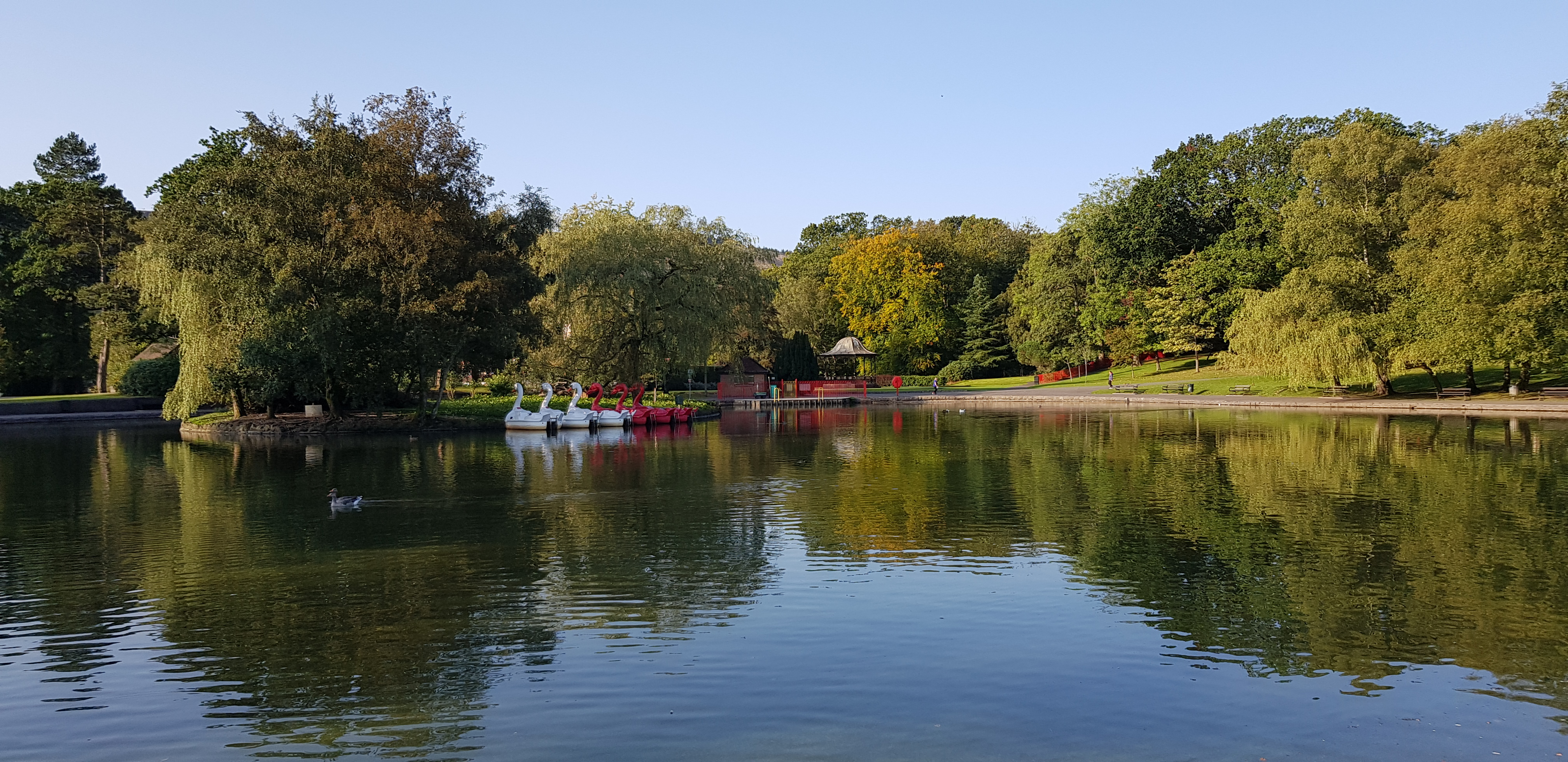
Aberdare Park Boating Lake

Canada Geese, Aberdare Park, January 2019

Geese and young, Aberdare Park, July 2020

Aberdare Park (Welsh: Parc Aberdâr) is a well-preserved Victorian public park located in the village of Trecynon, near the town of Aberdare in South Wales. The park is designated Grade II* on the Cadw/ICOMOS Register of Parks and Gardens of Special Historic Interest in Wales.

== History ==
The park occupies nearly fifty acres (20 ha). It opened on 27 July 1869. It was landscaped and planted by William Barron, who had laid out many parks in England. The park was created at the instigation of Rees Hopkin Rhys.

In April 1948, 33-year old Polish national Jerzy Strzadala was murdered in Aberdare Park in a case that is still unsolved.

In 1956 the National Eisteddfod was held in the park. A gorsedd circle was erected to commemorate this event; the stone circle is still remaining.

== Motorcycling ==
There is a 0.9-mile (1.4 km) circuit of public roads within the park which is used for motorcycle road racing. Races were held until 1964, with 15 starters in each race. Racing resumed on 24 June 1978.

This is one of only four anti-clockwise motor racing layouts in the UK; the others are Oliver's Mount, Blyton Raceway and Rockingham Speedway. It is said to be one of the best and hardest to master, despite its relatively short length. It is also one of only two street circuits in regular use on the UK mainland, the other being Oliver's Mount.

The annual Aberdare Park National Road Races are now held on the circuit. They are usually held over a weekend in July.

== Sculpture ==
Visitors to the park are greeted by the prominent sculpture of Sir William T. Lewis (Lord Merthyr). Unveiled in 1913, the sculptor was Thomas Brock.

== Trees ==
The park contains a mixture of native and exotic trees, most of which date back to the Victorian era. The following trees can be found at the park.

- Araucariaceae: Araucaria araucana (monkey puzzle tree)
- Birch: Betula pendula
- Beech: Fagus sylvatica
- Cedars: Cedrus atlantica, Cedrus libani
- Hawthorn: Crataegus monogyna
- Maples: Acer palmatum, Acer campestre, Acer platanoides, Acer pseudoplatanus
- Pines: Pinus nigra, Pinus wallichiana
- Poplar: Populus nigra 'Italica'
- Oaks: Quercus robur, Quercus ilex
- Cherries: Prunus serrulata
- Chestnuts: Castanea sativa
- Redwoods: Sequoiadendron giganteum, Sequoia sempervirens, Metasequoia
- Spruce: Picea sitchensis
- Willows: Salix 'Chrysocoma'
- Yew: Taxus baccata

== Gallery ==
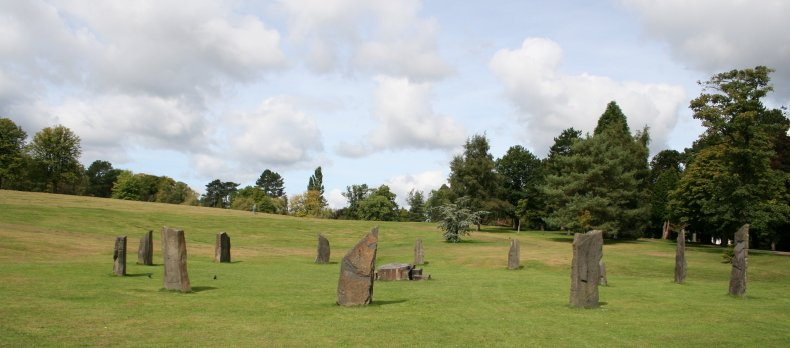
Gorsedd stones as used for the National Eisteddfod

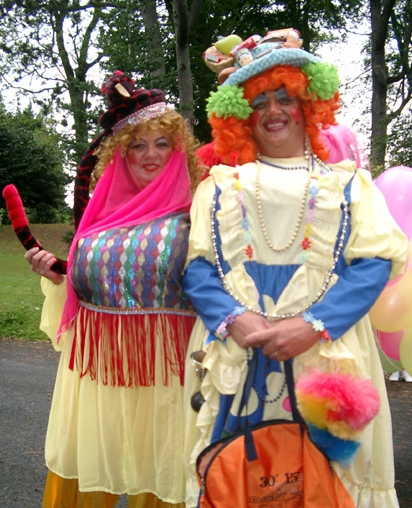
Participants during Aberdare Carnival

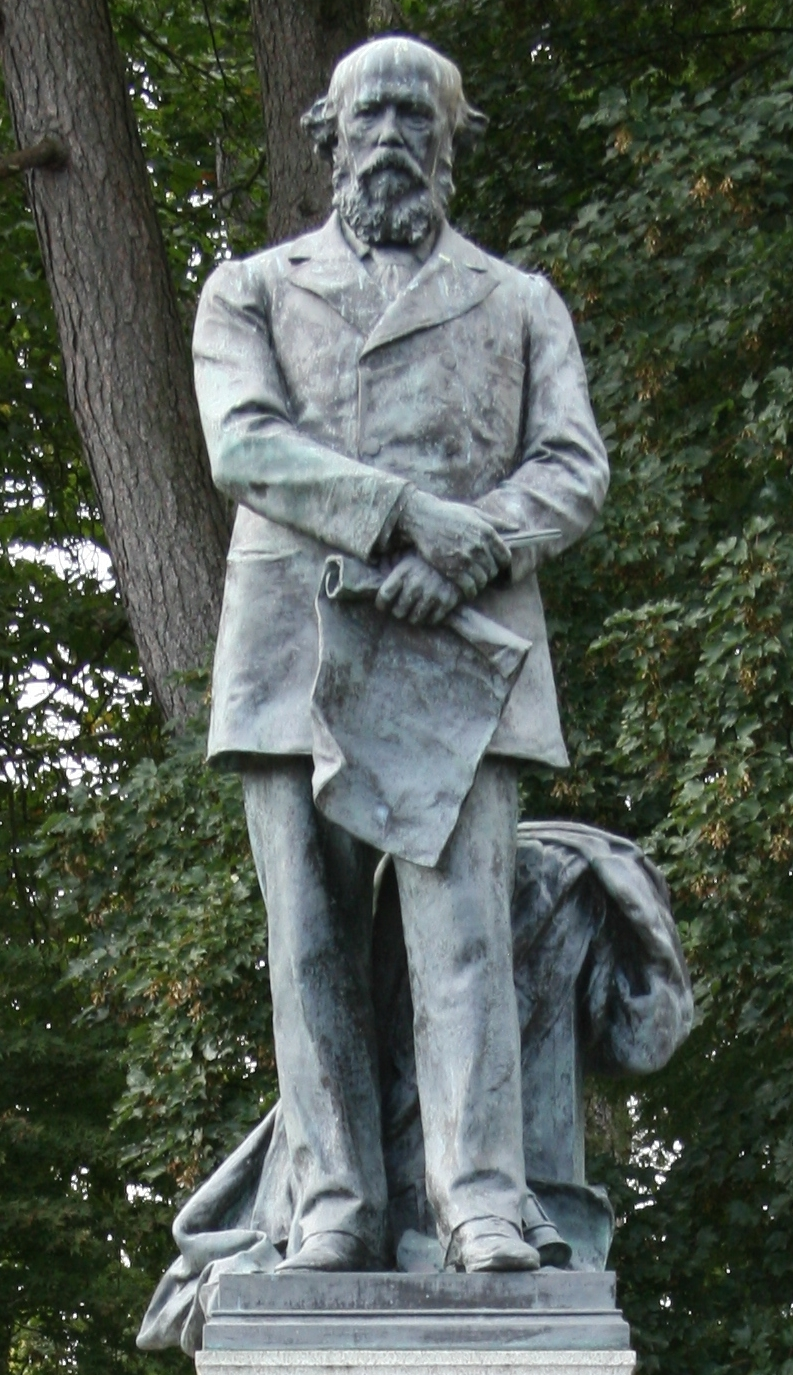
Lord Merthyr sculpture by Thomas Brock

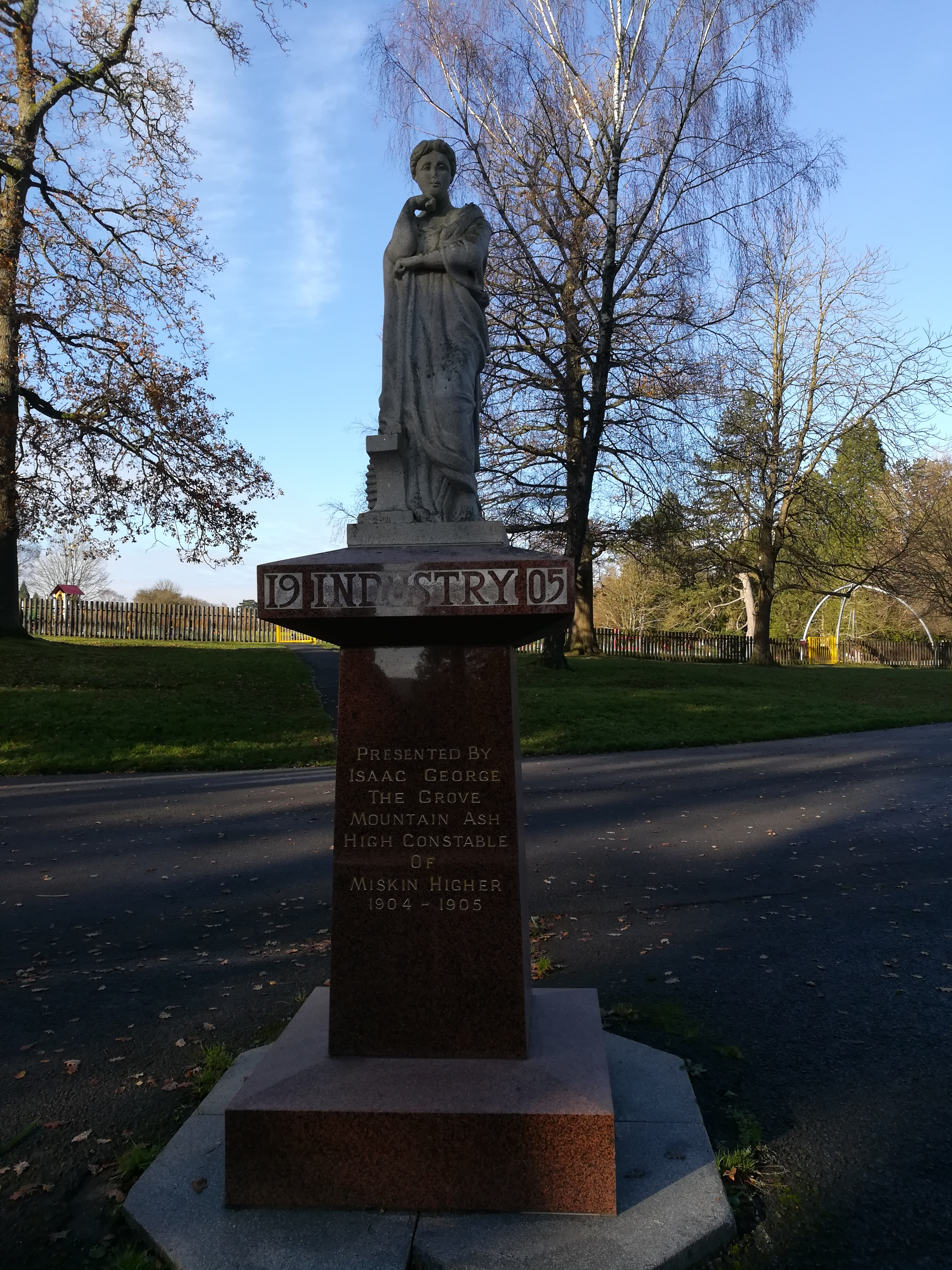
The Spirit of Industry statue which replaced the original fountain

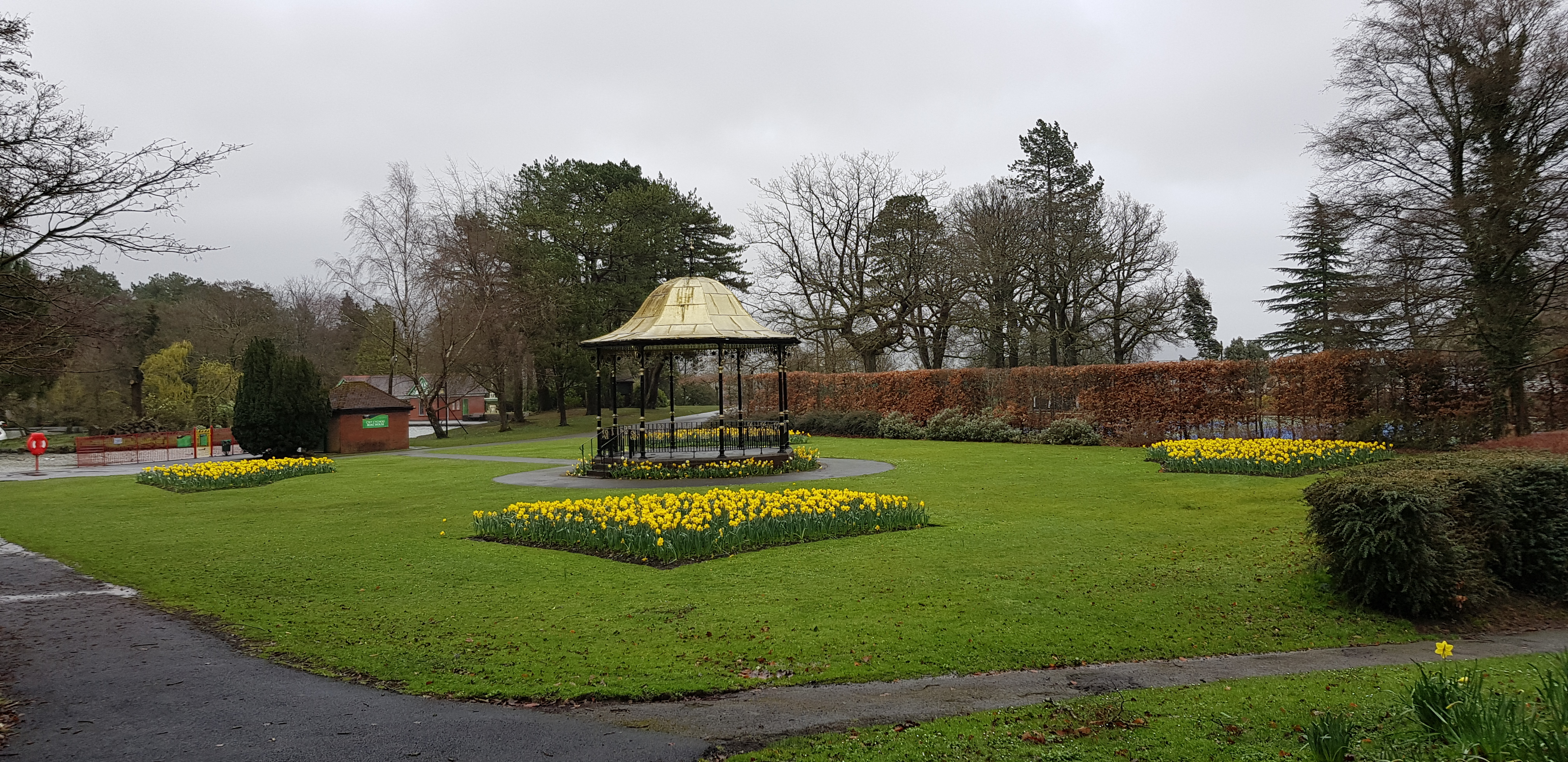
Bandstand at Aberdare Park, refurbished in 2019 to celebrate 150th Anniversary of Park opening

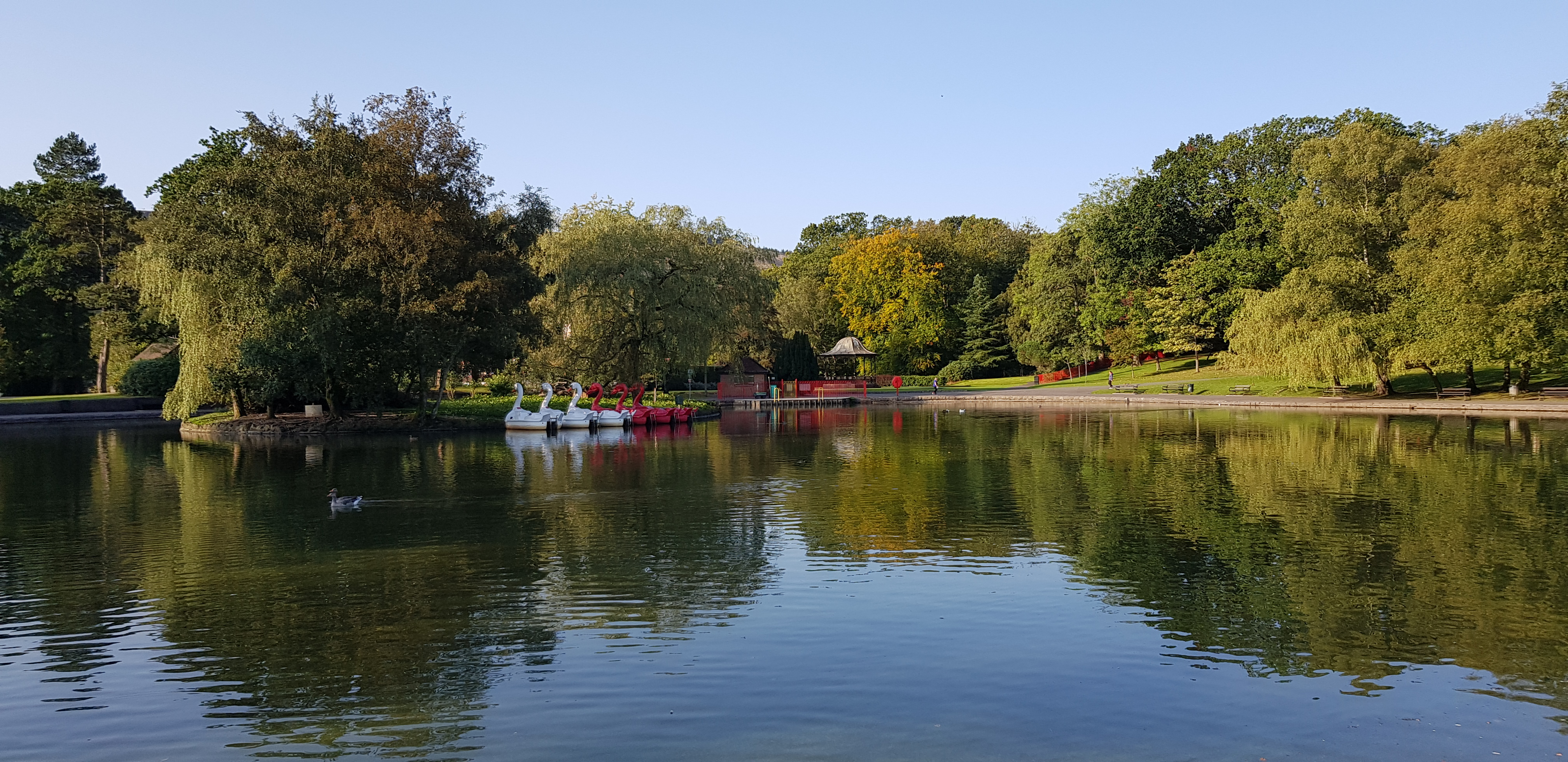
Aberdare Park Boating Lake

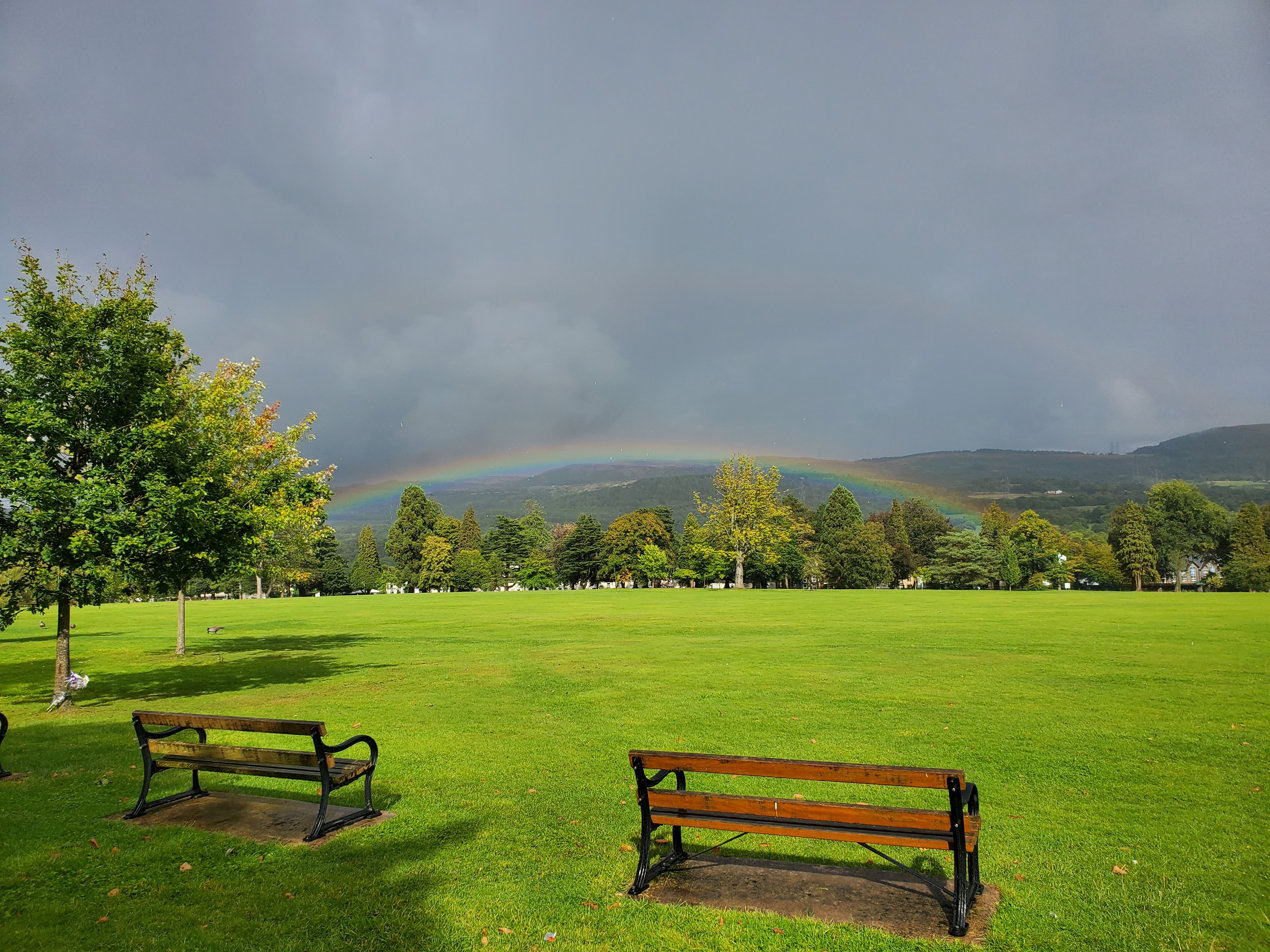
Rainbow over Trecynon, view from Aberdare Park

== See also ==
- Dare Valley Country Park
