= Insole (disambiguation) =

An insole is the inner sole of a shoe or other footwear.

Insole may also refer to:

- Doug Insole (1926–2017), English cricketer
- George Insole (1790–1851), South Wales colliery owner
- James Harvey Insole (1821–1901), South Wales colliery owner
- Insole Court, a Victorian Gothic mansion in Cardiff, Wales
