= Cymmer =

Cymer or Cymmer may refer to:

- Cymer Abbey a Cistercian abbey in Wales
- Cymmer Colliery explosion, a mining accident in the Rhondda Valley in 1856

There are several places in Wales named Cymmer (standard Welsh: Cymer, meaning "confluence").

- Cymmer, Rhondda Cynon Taf, a village and community near Porth
- Cymmer, Neath Port Talbot, a village in the Afan Valley (also spelt Cymer)
- Cymer (Edeirnion) (sometimes spelt Cymmer), a place in the former parish of Llangar, Denbighshire
