= Idris Williams =

Welsh educationalist and councillor (1836–1894)

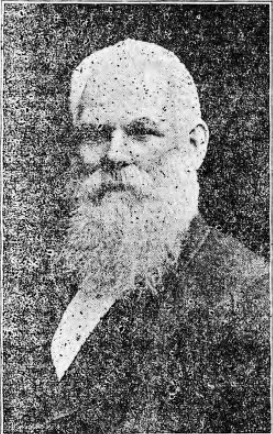
- Born: 19 (or 9) April 1836; Porth, Rhondda Valley, Wales
- Died: 4 November 1894 (aged 58); Porth, Rhondda Valley, Wales
- Burial place: Cymmer Independent Chapel, Cymmer, Rhondda Valley, Wales
- Known for: Educationalist, prominent Congregationalist, Glamorgan County Council councillor

Idris Williams (19 (or 9) April 1836 – 4 November 1894) was an educationalist, prominent Congregationalist, and Liberal councillor for the Cymmer division of the Glamorgan County Council, South Wales.

== Early life ==
Idris Williams was born at Porth Farm on 19 (or 9) April 1836, the third and youngest son of Edward and Jane Williams. At that time, Rhondda was a remote, rural town. During his lifetime, Williams witnessed the transformation of the valley into an industrial community. In the early 1840s, his family leased land and mineral rights at Ynyshir to Shepherd and Evans. Williams received very little formal education and at the age of nine he went to work as a haulier at George Insole & Son's Cymmer Colliery. At the age of sixteen he was sent to a school in Cardiff and two years later became an apprentice carpenter at Pontypridd. After completing his training he returned to the Cymmer Pit to work as a carpenter in 1854–5. In 1855 he was married to Mary Evans, daughter of the Rev. Joshua Evans of Cymmer. They had six children.

== Public life ==
Williams supported William Abraham (Mabon) during his successful campaign for election to Parliament in 1885 as Liberal-Labour MP for Rhondda. In 1892 Williams became a Liberal councillor for the Cymmer division of the Glamorgan County Council. Although he lost the popular election he took up the position unopposed a month later when the winning candidate became an alderman.

Richard Griffiths, in his study of the commercial life of the Rhondda, speculates that Williams' prominence in the public life of the Rhondda Valley was based on two factors. The first was his connection with the pre-industrial society of the valley as the heir to Porth Farm, an agricultural holding that disappeared with the advent of industrialisation (although the former farmhouse, where his younger brother Levi Williams lived, survived next to the railway station in the centre of Porth). The second factor was the considerable wealth that he accrued after coal mining operations commenced on the land which formerly formed part of the Porth Farm.

== Death and legacy ==
Williams died suddenly in Porth on 4 November 1894 and was buried four days later at the Cymmer Independent Chapel graveyard after "a vast concourse of people [had] assembled to pay their last tokens of respect and esteem."
