= Charles Wilkins (disambiguation) =

Sir Charles Wilkins (1749–1836) was an English printer and scholar.

Charles Wilkins may also refer to:

- Charles Wilkins (writer) (1830–1913), Welsh writer and historian
- Charles Wilkins (chemist) (1938–2025), American chemist
