= Cymmer Colliery explosion =

July 1856 mining disaster in Wales

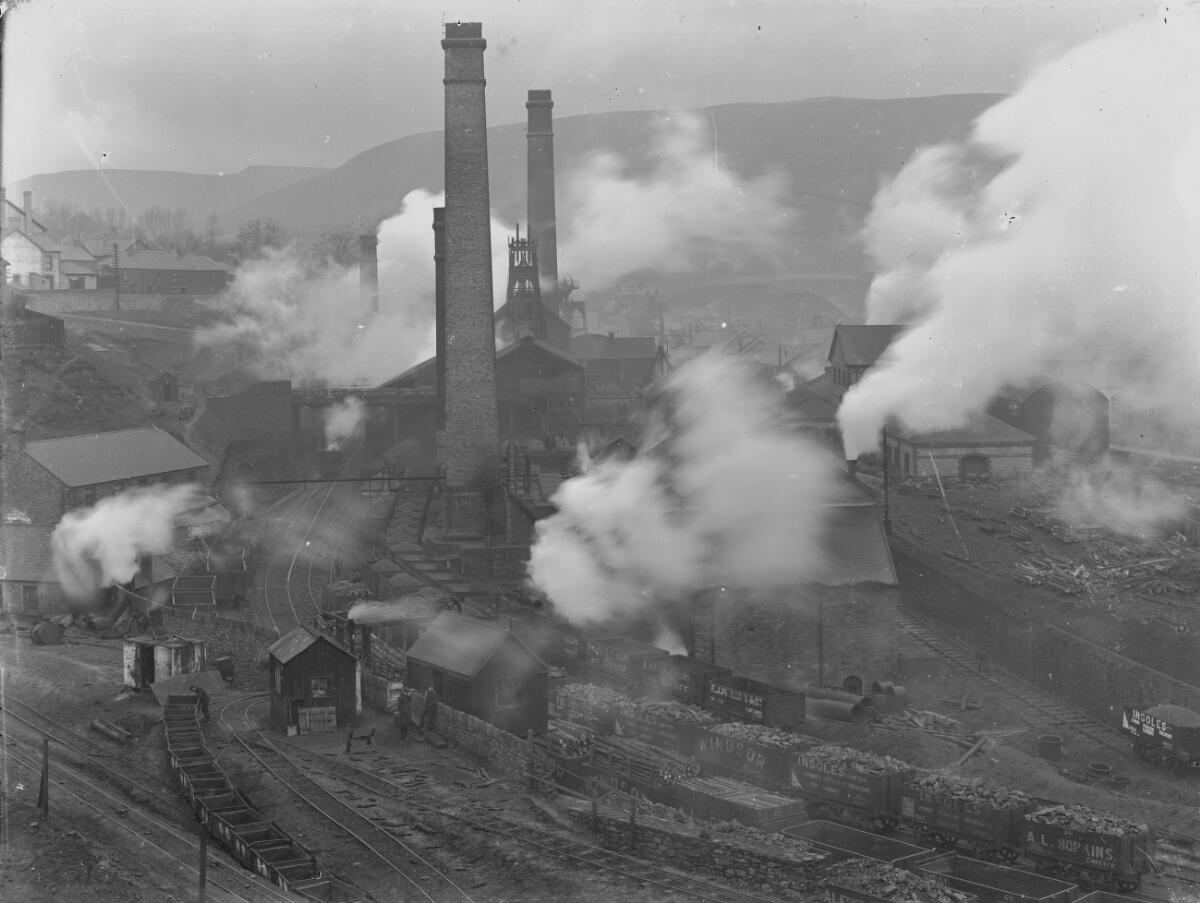
- Cymmer Colliery c. 1905

- Cymmer Old Pit mine (Rhondda Cynon Taf)
- Date: 15 July 1856
- Location: Cymmer Colliery near Porth, Wales; 51.6107°N 3.408°W
- Type: Underground gas explosion
- Cause: Defective mine ventilation and the use of naked flames underground
- Deaths: 114 men and boys
- Inquiries: Coroner's inquest: July 1856
- Coroner: George Overton
- Accused: Jabez Thomas (mine manager), Rowland Rowlands (overman), Morgan Rowlands (fireman), David Jones (fireman), William Thomas (fireman)
- Charges: Manslaughter
- Trial: Glamorgan Assizes: March 1857, Baron Watson
- Verdict: All defendants were acquitted

The Cymmer Colliery explosion occurred in the early morning of 15 July 1856 at the Old Pit mine of the Cymmer Colliery near Porth (lower Rhondda Valley), Wales, operated by George Insole & Son. The underground gas explosion resulted in a "sacrifice of human life to an extent unparalleled in the history of coal mining of this country" in which 114 men and boys were killed. Thirty-five widows, ninety-two children, and other dependent relatives were left with no immediate means of support.

The immediate cause of the explosion was defective mine ventilation and the use of naked flames underground. Factors contributing to the explosion included the rapid development of the mine to meet increased demand for coal, poor mine safety practices allowed by management despite official warnings, and deteriorating working relationships between miners and management.

After the explosion, mine owner James Harvey Insole and his officials were accused of "neglecting the commonest precautions for the safety of the men and the safe working of the colliery". At the coroner's inquest into the deaths, Insole deflected responsibility onto his mine manager Jabez Thomas and the jury brought a charge of manslaughter against Thomas and the four other mine officials. To the outrage of the local mining communities, the subsequent criminal proceedings resulted in the exoneration of the mine officials from any blame for the disaster.

The Cymmer Colliery disaster influenced the introduction of mine safety improvements including legislation for improved mine ventilation and the use of safety lamps, employment of children, and qualifications of mine officials. The tragedy highlighted the need for a workable compensation scheme for miners and their dependents to reduce their reliance on public charity after such disasters.

== Background ==
George Insole and his son James Harvey Insole purchased the Cymmer Colliery in 1844. In 1847 they sank the No. 1 Pit which, after 1853, became known as the Cymmer Old Pit. James Insole took control of the business on his father's death in 1851.

Between 1852 and 1855, HM Inspector of Mines Herbert Francis Mackworth inspected the colliery twice and sent letters to Insole recommending safety improvements, in particular to the mine's underground ventilation system and the use of safety lamps underground.

Colliers (miners) relied on the colliery firemen's daily reports of gas hazards before entering the mine. In 1854, mine manager Jabez Thomas summarily dismissed two experienced firemen and appointed two others from outside the colliery. The workmen complained to Insole they had no confidence in these replacements. The men's refusal to work under the new firemen, and Insole's insistence on exercising his "authority to dismiss or employ those whom I please, without consulting any body of men", led to a twenty-two week miners' strike. Financial loss and threat of legal action eventually compelled the men to return to work under the new firemen. (Note: The two fireman at the centre of the 1854 strike were replaced in 1855.)

By the mid-1800s, the Rhondda variety of coal was in high demand as a coking coal. The Crimean War created additional demand for coal, and in 1855 Insole intensified his mining operations at the Old Pit, doubling the number of colliers and increasing the mine area by over a third. Welsh historian E. D. Lewis concluded that,

It was the success of [the Cymmer Old Pit mine] when developed with such inordinate speed and recklessness by [George Insole's] son, James Harvey Insole, that led directly to the terrible mining disaster of 1856.

== Explosion ==
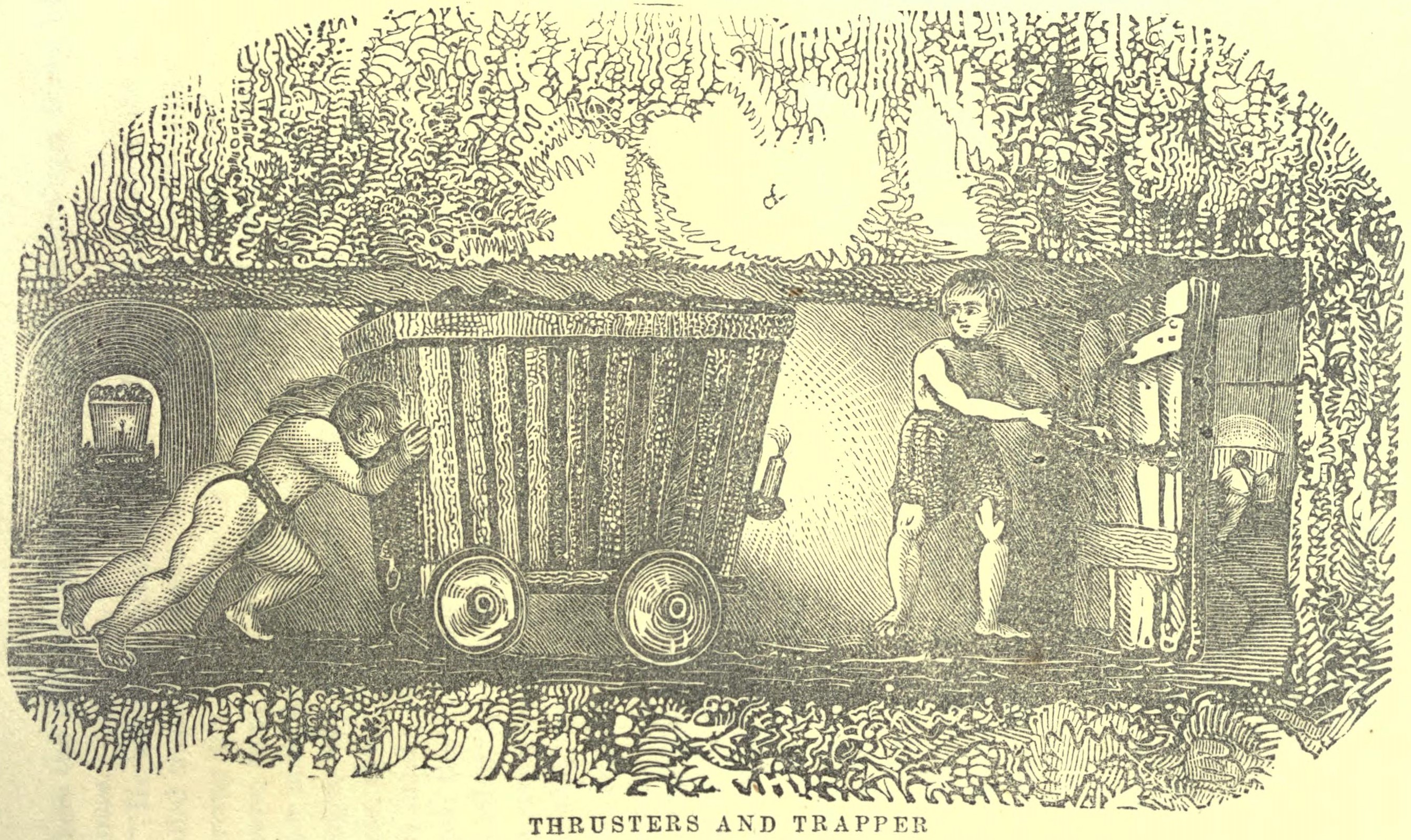
Two thrusters and a trapper (who worked the ventilation doors, usually boys) in a UK coal mine about 1853

On Tuesday, 15 July 1856, 160 men and boys descended the Old Pit mine shaft to commence their 6:00 a.m. shift. As they made their way to their workplaces underground, there was an explosion of gas near the mine entrance which trapped the colliers already deeper in the mine. It was three hours before rescuers could reach the site. They found that many of the colliers had congregated in groups to die together as they ran out of air. By that evening, 112 bodies had been recovered, another was brought up the next day, and a severely burnt collier died the following day. In his report to the Secretary of State for the year 1856, Mines Inspector Mackworth described the disaster as "the most lamentable and destructive explosion which had ever occurred in any colliery either in this country or abroad".

== Inquest ==
The coroner's inquest into the deaths began on 16 July 1856 in Porth before the North Glamorgan coroner George Overton and a jury of eighteen. It was adjourned to allow the jurors to view the bodies and reconvened eleven days later in Pontypridd. Twenty-nine witnesses were called. The evidence indicated that the explosion resulted from defective mine ventilation and the use of naked flames underground, (Note: both the Davy lamp and Geordie lamp safety lamps had been invented in 1815, and widely used in mines at the time) despite warnings having been sent to the mine owner by Mackworth. He told the inquest that "the explosion arose from the persons in charge of the pit neglecting the commonest precautions for the safety of the men and the safe working of the colliery".

The inquest determined that, apart from the collier who died later of burns, all the deaths were the result of "suffocation, caused by the post-explosion effects of afterdamp or methane poisoning". Among the 114 victims, thirty-four were boys under the age of sixteen and another fifteen were under the age of twelve. Insole, the mine owner, walked free from the inquest after claiming he took "no part in management" of the mine. The mine manager, Jabez Thomas, and the mine's officials, Rowland Rowlands (overman), Morgan Rowlands (fireman), David Jones (fireman), and William Thomas (fireman), were charged with manslaughter for negligence causing the deaths of 114 men.

Cymmer Colliery explosion victims as reported on 26 July 1856
#	Surname	Forename	Age	Condition	Reported description
1	Evans	Matthew	66	suffocated	married
2	Evans	Philip	22	burnt	
3	David	Jenkin	32	suffocated	
4	Daniel	David	25	suffocated	married
5	Lewis	Thomas	30	burnt	married
6	Hugh	Evan	24	suffocated	brother of John (18) and William (14), the three brothers and Thomas Lewis (30) lodged in the house of Lewis Powell who was unable to go to work that morning from having a day or two before accidentally hurt his arm
7	Hugh	John	18	suffocated	
8	Hugh	William	14	suffocated	
9	Griffiths	Peter	15	suffocated	
10	Griffiths	Henry	13	burnt	this poor little fellow was literally charred
11	Powell	David	13	suffocated	
12	Llewellyn	William	33	suffocated	wife and three children
13	Jenkins	Rees		suffocated and bruised	brother of John (18) and David (10)
14	Jenkins	John	18	suffocated	
15	Jenkins	David	10	suffocated	
16	Thomas	David	29	suffocated and bruised	
17	Isaac	John	17	suffocated	
18	Martin	William	23	suffocated and bruised	
19	Jones	Thomas	10	suffocated and bruised	
20	Rees	Benjamin	42	burnt badly	leaving a wife and five children
21	Llewellyn	Thomas	28	burnt slightly	leaving a wife and four small children
22	Thomas	David	17	burnt badly	he supported his widowed mother
23	Salathiel	Jaconia	18	suffocated and bruised	brother of John (14)
24	Salathiel	John	14	suffocated and bruised	
25	Lewis	Thomas	36	suffocated	wife and five children
26	Lewis	David	22	burnt badly	
27	Davies	David	15	burnt	the mother of this lad depended upon his labour for her support
28	Thomas	John	18	burnt very badly	
29	Callacott	William	12	suffocated	
30	Howells	Edward	22	suffocated	brother of David (17), they kept their mother, a widow at Dinas
31	Howells	David	17	burnt	
32	Hopkins	Thomas	26	burnt badly	wife and infant
33	John	Joseph	64	burnt	leaving a widow and several children all grown up
34	Morgan	John	15	suffocated	
35	Rees	Thomas	36	suffocated	married
36	Evans	W	17	suffocated and bruised	
37	Morgan	David	14	suffocated	
38	Williams	Thomas	38	suffocated	wife and four children
39	Rees	Richard	27	suffocated	wife and one child
40	Davies	Thomas	45	suffocated	wife and four children depending upon him for support, his son William (12) died with him
41	Davies	William	12	suffocated	
42	Davies	Thomas	46	burnt badly	leaving a widow and one child, his three sons William (16) Thos (13) David (10) also killed
43	Davies	William	16	burnt badly	
44	Davies	Thos	13	burnt badly	
45	Davies	David	10	burnt badly	
46	John	Isaac	18	suffocated	
47	Griffiths	George	18	burnt slightly	
48	Rees	Aaron	23	suffocated	wife and one young child
49	Davies	William	28	burnt	leaving a wife and one child
50	Roberts	John	11	burnt	
51	Matthews	Thomas	40	burnt	wife and six children
52	Williams	Thomas	40	burnt	
53	Jones	Billy		burnt	a young orphan lad, inmate of the same house as Thomas Matthews (40) and Thomas Williams (40)
54	Thomas	Gomer	11	suffocated	kept his mother who is a widow, her husband having been killed at these works a short time ago
55	Jervis	Henry	18	burnt badly	
56	Evans	John	16	burnt	
57	Evans	John	12	suffocated	
58	Thomas	Rees	16	burnt	
59	Miles	Walter	17	suffocated	brother of Richard (10), the two brothers kept their mother. Their father was formerly a fireman at the colliery, but he and the other fireman apprehended danger. They were discharged and the whole of the colliers turned out in consequence. He left to seek a home for his family in Australia leaving strict injunctions during his absence for neither of the boys to work in this colliery or he should not find them alive when he came back or send for them to come out to him.
60	Miles	Richard	10	suffocated	
61	Davies	Hezekiah	37	burnt	leaving a widow and two children
62	Davies	Thomas	11	burnt	
63	Davies	Eli	10	suffocated	
64	David	Morgan	18	suffocated	
65	Miles	Matthew	11	suffocated	
66	Morgan	Isaac	18	burnt	he supported his mother a widow
67	Morgan	David	23	suffocated	
68	Lewis	Evan	26	burnt badly	leaving a widow and one child
69	Evans	Morgan	15	suffocated	
70	Evans	Nathaniel	57	suffocated	wife and five children
71	Thomas	Daniel	21	burnt badly	
72	Davies	Thomas	20	suffocated	
73	Soloway	George	65	suffocated	wife and four children two of whom are grown up, his son Henry (13) also killed
74	Soloway	Henry	13	burnt	
75	Phillips	Evan	45	suffocated	wife and 4 children
76	Thomas	W	19	burnt	
77	Andrews	Thos	26	suffocated	wife and one child
78	James	Richard	15	suffocated	
79	Morgan	Morgan	18	suffocated	brother of Enoch (15) and Thomas (12)
80	Morgan	Enoch	15	suffocated	
81	Morgan	Thomas	12	burnt	
82	Jones	Enoch	22	suffocated	brother of Henry (18)
83	Jones	Henry	18	suffocated	
84	Lewis	Daniel	30	suffocated	leaving a widow and three children
85	Richards	David	34	burnt	wife and one child
86	Richards	Zacheniah	24	burnt slightly	wife and three children
87	Morgan	David	17	suffocated	
88	Jenkins	William	40	suffocated	leaving a widow and three children, his son William (12) also killed
89	Jenkins	William	12	suffocated	
90	Williams	William	28	burnt	wife and three small children
91	Rees	John	11	burnt badly	
92	Morgan	Morgan	42	suffocated	wife and six children
93	Evans	Benjamin	14	suffocated	
94	Williams	John	48	suffocated	
95	Williams	Daniel	17	suffocated	
96	Davies	Edward	10	suffocated	
97	Edwards	Thomas	12	suffocated	
98	Morgan	William	11	suffocated	
99	John	David	37	suffocated	leaving a widow and three small children, his two sons John (11) and Lazarus (10) also killed
100	John	John	11	suffocated	
101	John	Lazarus	10	suffocated	
102	Williams	Thomas	15	burnt	
103	Davies	Thomas	17	suffocated	
104	Harris	David	15	suffocated	
105	Rees	William	41	suffocated	leaving a widow and four children
106	Edmunds	Samuel	37	suffocated	leaving a widow and seven children, his son William (11) was clasped fast in his father's arms
107	Edmunds	William	11	suffocated	
108	Haynes	William	12	suffocated	
109	Lewis	Edward	37	burnt	wife and one child, his son Thomas (12) also killed
110	Lewis	Thomas	12	suffocated	
111	Evans	William	46	suffocated	wife and one child, his son John (18) also killed
112	Evans	John	18	suffocated	
113	Thomas	Llewellyn	13	burnt badly	
114	Evans	Morgan	16	burnt badly	died the day after he was removed from the pit

== Trial ==
At the Glamorgan Spring Assizes held in Swansea in March 1857, the judge, Baron Watson (Sir William Henry Watson), made his own position clear in his pre-trial address to the grand jury. Noting that the mine manager did not go underground, and that "no direct case of omission" had been brought against the other mine officials, he indicated that they could not be guilty of manslaughter. Nevertheless, the grand jury returned a "true bill" (indictment) against Jabez Thomas, Rowland Rowlands, and Morgan Rowlands, who were then tried on the charge of "having feloniously and wilfully killed and slain one William Thomas, (Note: Evidence given at the inquest indicates William Thomas (19) and his brother (13) were probably closest to the source of the explosion.) on the 15th July, 1856". At the trial, it was reported that the judge made clear he sided with the defendants and thought the matter should not have come to court.

At the conclusion of the trial, the jury complied with the judge's directions to acquit the defendants. To the deep distress and anger of the local mining communities, the final result of the legal proceedings was that the mine owner and his officials were exonerated from all blame. However, E. D. Lewis' analysis of the disaster concluded that:

Possibly the legal processes of the time were insufficient to punish those who were culpable, but of the moral responsibility of owner and officials, even when judged against the background of their own time and place, there can be no question.

== Survivors ==
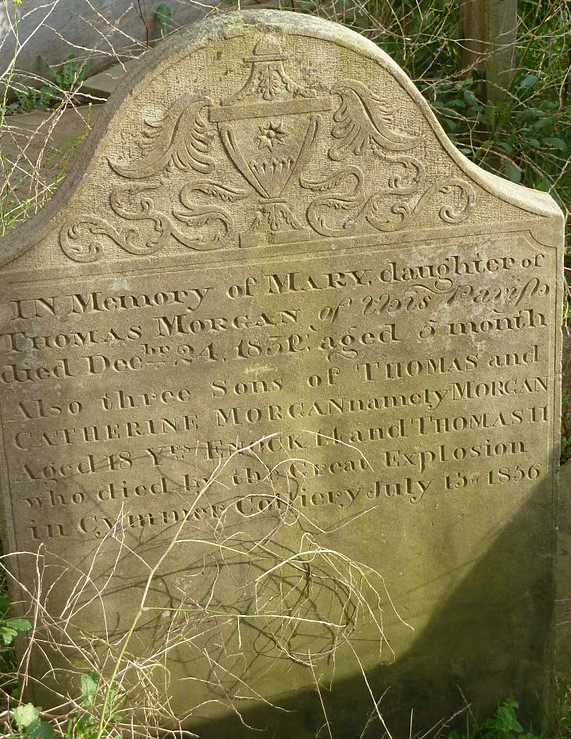
Gravestone of "three sons of Thomas and Catherine Morgan, namely Morgan aged 18 Yrs Enock 14 and Thomas 11 who died by the Great Explosion in the Cymmer Colliery July 15th 1856". They were buried in the Cymmer Independent Chapel graveyard.

Among the small local communities no household was left untouched, almost all the working-age men and boys having perished. Thirty graves were opened at the Cymmer Independent Chapel graveyard and the bodies of forty-eight victims were interred on 17 July 1856 in the presence of huge crowds (estimated at 15,000 people). Smaller numbers of burials occurred in other local communities, with "11 at Tonyrefail, nine at Ffrwd Amos, eight at the Dinas Methodist Chapel, and the rest at Pontypridd, Treforest, Coed Cymmer, Llantrissant, Llanharry, Bedwas, Trelanos, Brynmenyn, Wauntrodau, Llanwonno". Thirty-five widows, ninety-two children, and other dependent relatives were left with no immediate means of support. The court's verdict meant the Fatal Accidents Act 1846, which required compensation to be paid only when a mine manager or proprietor was held to have been at fault, did not apply.

However gross may have been the neglect which caused the husband's death, all interests are arrayed against the survivors. The colliers, the jury, the means of legal redress, are subject to the influence ... [of] the proprietor of the colliery. The cost of an administration, before an action can be commenced, and the difficulty of obtaining a solicitor who will undertake the odium and the risk, unite in forming an insuperable bar to the claim due to the widow and the fatherless, who, by the neglect or cupidity of others, have been plunged in one moment into the deepest affliction and most abject poverty.

— Mines Inspector Mackworth's report to the Secretary of State, 1855

The dependents of the victims of the disaster had to rely on public charity and "the final humiliation" of seeking poor relief. Insole contributed £500 (approximately equivalent to £46,600 in 2025) to the Cymer Widows' and Orphans' Fund, set up shortly after the disaster, and undertook to meet the cost of the thirty graves. However, local coal owners also combined to deny work to those colliers who had given evidence against the mine officials at the inquest and trial. Laments were published and, marking the first anniversary of the disaster, a song was published under the patronage of Mrs Insole of Ely Court (Insole's wife) in aid of the relief fund.

== Legacy ==
Described by Mines Inspector Thomas Evans as a "sacrifice of human life to an extent unparalleled in the history of coal mining of this country", the Cymmer Colliery disaster of 1856 influenced future coal-mining practices, locally and nationally. After another gas explosion at the colliery in December 1856, the single-shaft Cymmer Old Pit and New Pit mines were linked to create a safer and better ventilated two-shaft arrangement. Although mechanical mine ventilators had been used in the Lower Rhondda from 1851, they were installed at the Cymmer Colliery in the mid-1870s. Also by the mid-1870s, the colliery management realised it was safer and cheaper to provide colliers with safety lamps. The Cymmer Old Pit was worked by the Insole company until the mine closed in 1939.

More broadly, influenced by the number of children killed in the disaster, the Mines Regulation Act 1860 prohibited employment of boys under twelve years of age, unless they could read and write and were attending school for at least three hours a day on two days a week. Two-shaft mines were made compulsory by 1865. Mackworth's safety recommendations, sent to Insole in 1854 and including "that a qualified mining engineer and a sufficient number of competent subordinate officers and deputies should take complete charge of the machinery, ventilation, ways and works and watch over and provide for the safety of the workmen during the hours of labour", were passed in the Mines Act 1872. Following the Cymmer Colliery explosion, steps were taken to reduce the reliance on public charity in the case of fatal disasters by introducing comprehensive compensation schemes, but the first successful scheme did not emerge until 1881.

In July 2010 The Friends of Insole Court, the trust that was set up to restore Insole Court, dedicated a tree to the miners who died in the accident. In 2015 around 40 pupils and teachers from two different schools walked the Glo-Aur walk to remember the miners. The walk was 17 miles long, spanning from the site of the former pit to Insole Court. The pupils each brought a lump of coal from Porth, as a symbolic gesture. The coal was exchanged for a golden coin upon their arrival at Insole Court.

== See also ==
- List of disasters in Great Britain and Ireland by death toll
