= Ingrid Fritsch =

American biochemist

- Born: Utah, United States
- Spouse: Charles Wilkins
- Children: 2

Academic background
- Education: BSc, Chemistry, 1985, University of Utah; PhD, Chemistry, 1990, University of Illinois Urbana-Champaign
- Thesis: Relationships between electron transport and redox center concentrations within molecular networks (1990)
- Doctoral advisor: Larry Faulkner
- Website: wordpressua.uark.edu/analyticalchem/

Ingrid Fritsch is an American biochemist. She is a Professor in the Department of Chemistry and Biochemistry at the University of Arkansas.

== Early life and education ==
Fritsch graduated from Skyline High School in Millcreek, Utah in 1981. Due to her high grade point average, she received a President's Scholarship for the University of Utah. During her junior year, Fritsch was initiated into Phi Beta Kappa. After graduating with a Bachelor of Science degree in chemistry, Fritsch enrolled at the University of Illinois Urbana-Champaign for her PhD. She completed her PhD dissertation "Relationships between electron transport and redox center concentrations within molecular networks" under the guidance of Larry Faulkner.

== Career ==
After completing postdoctoral work at the Massachusetts Institute of Technology, Fritsch joined the faculty of Chemistry and Biochemistry at the University of Arkansas in 1992. She received the 1997 Royce W. Murray Young Investigator Award from The Society for Electroanalytical Chemistry in recognition of her accomplishments within the first 10 years of her career. As an associate professor in 1999, Fritsch helped build the world’s smallest self-contained electrochemical analyzer. The purpose of the device was to make analytical tools more accessible for scientists studying the glucose content of blood in diabetics and pollution levels of lakes, streams and city water sources.

In 2014, Fritsch was elected a Fellow of the National Academy of Inventors for "developing portable devices for environmental and point-of-care chemical analysis." She was elected a Fellow of the American Association for the Advancement of Science in 2015 for her "contributions in the field of magnetohydrodynamically-coupled electrochemistry and the development of microband electrodes."

== Personal life ==
Fritsch married Daniel Faules in June 1985. She later remarried to Charles Wilkins and they have two children together.
