= Lucy Thomas (businesswoman) =

Welsh colliery owner (1781–1847)

- Born: Lucy Williams; Llansamlet, Wales
- Baptised: 11 March 1781
- Died: 27 September 1847 (aged 66); Abercanaid, Wales
- Occupation: Coal owner
- Spouse: Robert Thomas (m.1802–d.1833)
- Children: 6 sons, 2 daughters
- Relatives: 1st Baron Merthyr (grandson-in-law)

Lucy Thomas (née Williams, baptised 11 March 1781 – 27 September 1847) was a Welsh businesswoman and colliery owner known as the "mother of the Welsh steam coal trade". Thomas took over the running of her husband Robert's coal mine after his death in 1833. Unusual as it was at the time that a woman ran the business, more unusually she was also illiterate. Business documents held in the Glamorgan Archives show she signed only with an X. Much of Thomas' subsequent success as a businesswoman was embellished by Merthyr historian Charles Wilkins, who wrote one of the few articles on her life. It is now believed that George Insole, a Cardiff agent, was one of the chief architects of her success, though this does not diminish Thomas's position as one of the few women coal owners in industrial Britain. It is recorded that Lucy once attended the Coal Exchange in Cardiff only to be told she could not enter. She sent a male clerk in her employ into the Coal Exchange with a letter informing the establishment that "My coal is equal to any mans, failure to grant entry will lead to my business lining another's pockets."

== Background ==
Lucy Thomas (née Williams) was baptised in Llansamlet, south Wales, on 11 March 1781; she is the daughter of Job Williams and his wife, Ann James. She married Robert Thomas at Llansamlet on 30 June 1802. Robert was a contractor of a coal level, providing fuel for Cyfarthfa Ironworks. They had eight children, six sons and two daughters.

== As an industrialist ==
In 1824, Robert Thomas took up an annual tenancy from Lord Plymouth for the opening and mining of a small coal level at Waun Wyllt, near Abercanaid, south of Merthyr. The contract forbade Robert Thomas from trading with the four local iron-works which were under the ownership of Lord Plymouth. Although little was expected from the level, it was the first to hit the "Four Foot Seam", a rich deposit of high quality steam coal. The mine initially sold its coal to local households in Merthyr and Cardiff, with a tramline being constructed from Thomas's level to the Glamorganshire Canal to allow transportation to Cardiff Docks. Robert shipped his coal along the canal to Merthyr from July 1828 and to Cardiff from February 1829 (in particular, Robert supplied Richard Biddle, a Cardiff trader, from that month). In November 1830, George Insole (in partnership with Biddle) had arranged the shipment of 414 tons of steam coal from Waun Wyllt to London.

Robert Thomas died in 1833. Lucy Thomas was granted letters of administration for the estate (having co-signed a surety bond with her son William and George Insole). From that time, Insole's payments for the coal dispatched were paid to her. Through Insole, a contract was written with Messrs Wood and Company to supply the London-based coal merchants with a quantity of 3,000 tons of coal per year. These early deals with the London markets helped establish the reputation of Welsh coal and were the basis on which Thomas became known as "the mother of the Welsh steam coal trade". Although Thomas was credited with these ventures, it is now believed that much of the success was due to Insole. The embellishment of Thomas's achievements are today attributed to Merthyr historian Charles Wilkins, who wrote an account of Thomas in 1888. Wilkins had a penchant for imaginative touches and his account gives the impression of Thomas as an enterprising woman who looked to set up new markets, whereas evidence now suggests that this work was conducted by her agents. Further research has also shown that coal had been shipped to London from Wales before either of the Thomases began extracting coal from their level, with shipments from Llanelli and Swansea being exported to the capital as early as 1824.

The lease for the Waun Wyllt level was terminated in the mid-1830s and Thomas then leased the neighbouring Graig pit which also exploited the Four Foot Seam.

== Death and legacy ==
In September 1847, Lucy Thomas contracted typhoid fever and died two weeks later on 27 September 1847 at her home in Abercanaid. She was buried in the family plot in the cemetery of the Unitarian chapel at Cefn-coed-y-cymmer near Merthyr. Despite the evidence available today, the myth of Lucy Thomas as "the mother of the Welsh steam coal trade" has endured, probably in part due to the image of a lone, illiterate but doughty widow engaging in a near-totally male dominated industry but also because the business did grow more than ten-fold under her hand in the fourteen years from her husband's death. A memorial fountain was erected in 1906 on the High Street of Merthyr Tydfil in commemoration of Robert and Lucy Thomas, in part funded by her granddaughter's husband, William Lewis, 1st Baron Merthyr.
