= The Red Dragon (magazine) =

Welsh literary periodical (1882–1887)

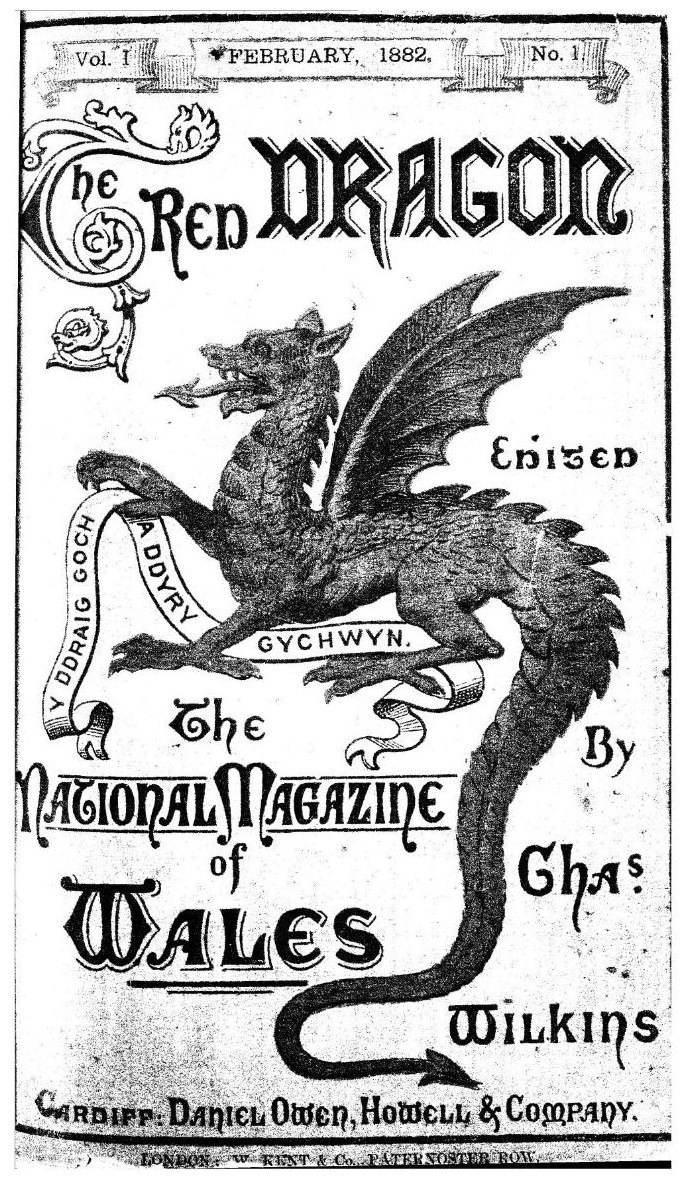
- Motto: Y Ddraig Goch A Ddyry Gychwyn "The Red Dragon Will Lead The Way"
- Editor: Charles Wilkins 1882–1885
- Editor: James Harris 1885–1887
- Categories: Welsh history and literature
- Frequency: Monthly
- Publisher: Daniel Owen & Co. (Cardiff, Wales)
- Founder: Charles Wilkins
- First issue: February 1882
- Final issue: June 1887
- Country: Wales
- Language: English
- Website: The National Library of Wales: Welsh Journals

The Red Dragon, The National Magazine of Wales, was a monthly English-language literary magazine published in Cardiff, Wales, from February 1882 until June 1887. It was edited by Charles Wilkins until July 1885 when James Harris took over.

Although directed primarily at the people of South Wales, it was intended "to make known to the greater English world the characteristics and aims of the Welsh people and the beauties of their language and literature". The magazine included articles on the history of Wales (emphasising its recent history), biographies, poetry and serial novels.

The closure of the magazine elicited numerous expressions of regret in local newspapers in 1887. The Red Dragon remains a useful historical resource for modern scholars as a record of traditional lore.

== Background ==
The 1880s was a pivotal time of social change for Wales, especially in terms of the effects of industrialisation on traditional rural culture, language, religion, education, and politics. Three-quarters of the population spoke Welsh (though most not exclusively) but a middle-class culture had developed that identified English with business and success. While there were "articulate and powerful groups of business and professional Welshmen who congregated in London", Wales was considered by many British people to be little more than a picturesque relic of earlier times.

English-language periodicals such as The Cambrian Register (1795–96, 1818), The Cambro-Britain and General Celtic Repository (1820–1822), The Cambrian Quarterly (1829–1833), and The Cambrian Journal (1854–1864) had intermittently attempted to promote Welsh learning, but had not lasted.

== History and content ==
The founding editor of The Red Dragon was historian and writer Charles Wilkins who managed the magazine from February 1882 to June 1885. By that time, he was "the most learned literary figure in Merthyr – and indeed in Wales". Although born in England, he had lived most of his life in Merthyr Tydfil. He had already written histories of Merthyr and Wales and won a gold medal for his writing at the 1881 National Eisteddfod. His bardic name was Catwg. Through The Red Dragon, Wilkins intended to reach a growing public literate in English but with little knowledge of Wales and "to make known to the greater English world the characteristics and aims of the Welsh people and the beauties of their language and literature".

James Harris took over the editorship in July 1885. Also from Merthyr Tydfil, he was previously a journalist and contributor to the magazine. He continued as editor until June 1887 when the last number was published. The magazine was printed in Cardiff by Daniel Owen & Company.

As well as writing extensively for the magazine themselves, the editors assembled a group of regular contributors "who had had an English scholastic training". Though traditional and conservative in outlook, the magazine featured a number of women authors, including Amy Dillwyn, Kate Dodd, Jeanette Forsyth, and Ella Egerton; and conveyed a "sense of admiration and affection for working people in Wales". The Red Dragon displayed a "sustained awareness of the pressures on the poor and a clear-sighted appreciation of the realities of working life", and treated the lives of working people in Wales "respectfully and with real interest".

Social and political comment is presented alongside other solid literary content including biographies, poetry and serialised novels. The magazine sought to provide a Welsh perspective on current issues of society, economics and politics, including land ownership and public education, and reported the activities of Welsh members of Parliament. Issues of social difference and the contrast between rural and urban are recurring themes. Regular sections include "Marginal Notes on Library Books", "Literary and Art Notes", and "Notes and Queries" on items of literary and antiquarian interest "confined to matters relating to Wales and the Border Counties".

The magazine received numerous favourable reviews in the South Wales newspapers (though Wilkins also wrote for many of the same papers). Malcolm Ballin's modern study of Welsh periodicals notes that "At its peak [The Red Dragon] commanded for the first time the attention of a newly recognised audience for a Welsh periodical in English." The magazine was priced at one shilling (approximately equivalent to £6 in 2023) per issue, though this was halved for the January 1884 to June 1885 issues.

The closure of The Red Dragon, in June 1887, was noted with regret in letters to the editors of the local newspapers. One newspaper editor opined that "it would appear to be one thing to place before the English-speaking public of Wales high-class reading matter, and quite another thing to make the said English-speaking public appreciate the effort at its true value".

== Legacy ==
The Red Dragon displays a "sustained awareness of the pressures on the poor and a clear-sighted appreciation of the realities of working life" and treats the lives of working people in Wales "respectfully and with real interest". The magazine continues to be valuable to modern scholars as a historical resource, created in response to the "urgent need to rescue and record such traditional lore which was then rapidly fading from memory".

== Issues ==
- 1882: Vol. I. Nos.1–6: February to July; Vol. II. Nos. 7–11: August to December
- 1883: Vol. III. Nos.1–6: January to June; Vol. IV. Nos. 7–12: July to December
- 1884: Vol. V. Nos.1–6: January to June; Vol. VI. Nos. 7–12: July to December
- 1885: Vol. VII. Nos.1–6: January to June; Vol. VIII. Nos. 7–12: July to December
- 1886: Vol. IX. Nos.1–6: January to June; Vol. X. Nos. 7–12: July to December
- 1887: Vol. XI. Nos.1–6: January to June (including an Index to our Notes and Queries from the Commencement to December 1886)
