= Charles Wilkins (writer) =

British writer and historian (1830–1913)

Charles Wilkins FGS
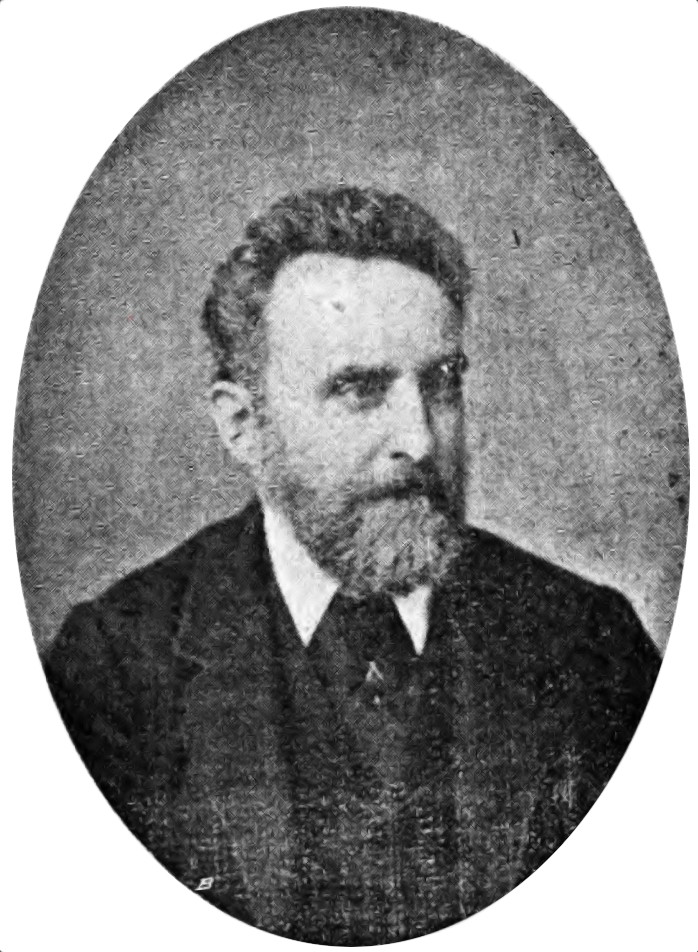
- Born: 16 August 1830; Stonehouse, Gloucestershire
- Died: 2 August 1913 (aged 82); Merthyr Tydfil, Glamorganshire
- Occupations: Postmaster, librarian
- Known for: Historical accounts of Wales and its industries
- Notable work: • The History of Merthyr Tydfil (1867, 1908) • The History of the Literature of Wales from 1300 to 1650 (1884) • The South Wales Coal Trade and Its Allied Industries (1888) • The History of the Iron, Steel, Tinplate and Other Trades of Wales (1903) • The Red Dragon (1882–1887, writer and founding editor)

Charles Wilkins (bardic name: Catwg, 16 August 1830 – 2 August 1913) of Merthyr Tydfil, Glamorganshire, was a prolific writer of historical accounts of Wales and its industries. He produced pioneering reference works on the histories of Merthyr Tydfil and Newport; the coal, iron, and steel trades of South Wales; and Welsh literature. He was also founding editor of The Red Dragon: The National Magazine of Wales.

== Background ==
Charles Wilkins was born on 16 August 1830 (Note: Some sources incorrectly give 1831.) in Stonehouse, Gloucestershire, the second of nine children of William Wilkins, a Chartist bookseller then postmaster, and Anna Maria Wilkins (née Jeens). From 1840 the family lived in Merthyr Tydfil, Glamorganshire. Leaving school at the age of fourteen, Wilkins worked first as postmaster's clerk to his father, then as postmaster from 1871 until his retirement in 1898. From 1846 to 1866 he was also librarian of the Merthyr Tydfil Subscription Library of which Thomas Stephens was secretary.

Wilkins married Lydia Jeens in Stonehouse in 1859. She died giving birth to their third child in 1867. The following year, Wilkins married Mary Skipp in Topsley, Hereford; they had two children.

Wilkins was Glamorganshire secretary of the Cambrian Archaeological Association, a fellow of the Geological Society of London, (Note: Some accounts incorrectly state Royal Geographical Society.) and a member of the Aberystwyth College committee. He was also a member of the Loyal Cambrian Lodge, No. 110, of Freemasons, Merthyr Tydfil, from 1872 to 1885.

== Historian, writer, editor ==
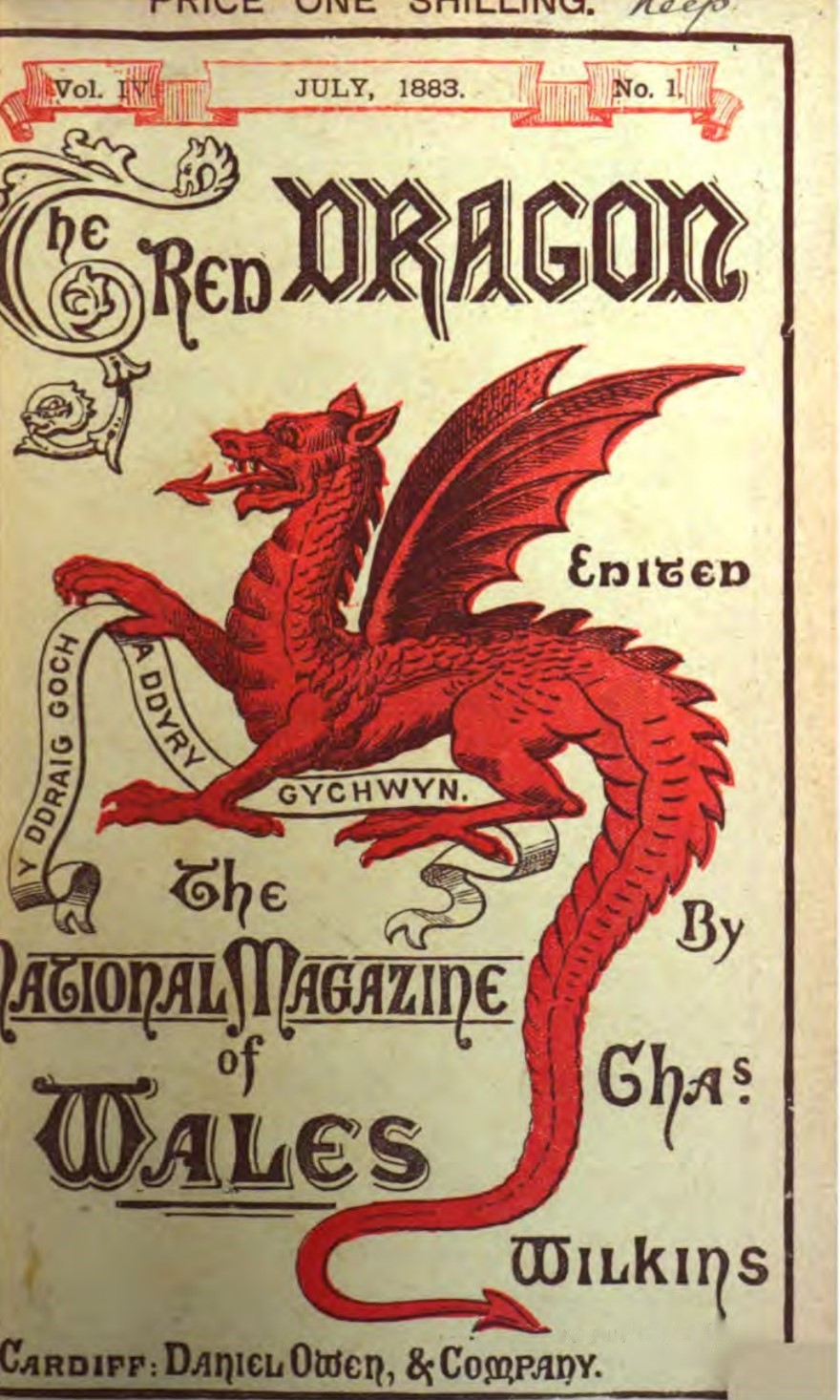
The Red Dragon cover page, July 1883 Motto: Y Ddraig Goch a ddyry gychwyn – "The Red Dragon will lead the way"

Wilkins' major works included the first histories of Merthyr Tydfil and Newport, a history of Wales, a history of Welsh literature, and histories of the coal, iron, and steel trades of South Wales.

From age fourteen, Wilkins wrote extensively over many years for the Merthyr Tydfil, Cardiff, and Swansea newspapers, including serialized versions of his books.

In 1877, Wilkins was "initiated into the mysteries of the Druidic lore", and at the 1881 National Eisteddfod, held in Merthyr Tydfil, he won a £21 prize (approximately equivalent to £2,200 in 2025) and gold medal for the best "History of the Literature of Monmouthshire and Glamorganshire from the earliest period to the present time." His bardic name was Catwg.

In 1882, it was reported that, "after careful examination of the various works written by Mr. Wilkins", he was "unanimously elected to the super graduate Degree of Literature (Lit. D.)" by the Druidic University of America and its affiliate in Maine. However, at the time of his retirement in 1898 the degree was described as PhD, though he "never permitted the title to be made any use of". (Note: Some use of the title (including the incorrect degree) was made, for example: "Charles Wilkins PhD" and "Dr Charles Wilkins". The Maine institution associated with the degree was closed in 1887 due to fraudulent transactions.)

From 1882 to 1885, Wilkins was editor and writer for the monthly periodical The Red Dragon: The National Magazine of Wales. This English language magazine published articles on Welsh history, biography, and poetry, and was a "calculated attempt to reach out to a new public literate in English but unschooled in a knowledge of Wales". Though traditional and conservative, it included women writers and displayed a "sense of admiration and affection for working people in Wales".

== Death ==
Wilkins died on 2 August 1913 at his home in Merthyr Tydfil and was buried at Cefn Cemetery, Merthyr Tydfil.

== Legacy ==
Except for his 1867 history of Merthyr Tydfil, reviews of Wilkins' major works were generally glowing, though not necessarily disinterested as they were published in newspapers for which Wilkins also wrote.

On his retirement in 1898, Wilkins was described as "a literary postmaster: successful editor, prolific writer, and sound historian – an Englishman with a Welshman's enthusiasm" and "a genuine Cymro by adoption". It was asserted "with great confidence that there are very few men indeed who have 'put in' more work for Wales than Charles Wilkins". He was described as "the first to write the history of Merthyr and Newport, the first to gather together the facts about the coal, iron, and steel trades of South Wales, and the first to set forth in due order the story of [Welsh] literature from 1300 to 1650."

In a wide-ranging survey of the literary associations of Merthyr Tydfil, given before the Merthyr Naturalists' Society in 1909, local scholar A. J. Perman highlighted "the veteran historian of Merthyr" Wilkins' work as particularly noteworthy among contemporary writers. "It is safe to say he has laid all future writers under immense obligation to his laborious efforts. They show doubtless less power of selection than of accumulation, but the facts are there in abundance, ... and it is this patient gathering of local annals which makes the wide generalisations of national history possible."

Malcolm Ballin's modern study of Welsh periodicals notes that during Wilkins' editorship of The Red Dragon the magazine displayed a "sustained awareness of the pressures on the poor and a clear-sighted appreciation of the realities of working life" and treated the lives of working people in Wales "respectfully and with real interest". Wilkins' magazine continues to be valuable as a historical resource, created in the context of the "urgent need to rescue and record such traditional lore which was then rapidly fading from memory".

Wilkins was a prolific pioneer in his field and later research has demonstrated some errors and imbalances in his writings. For example, Wilkins was the chief architect of Lucy Thomas' fame as "the mother of the Welsh steam coal trade". His 1888 account gives the impression of Thomas as an enterprising woman who actively went after new markets, whereas evidence now suggests that this work was mainly conducted by her agents, particularly George Insole. Later authors have also commented on the "notorious unreliability" of some of his work. Nevertheless, Wilkins' labours have "smooth[ed] the paths of all future writers on these subjects" and his works have continued to be referenced in later academic studies.

Literary editor Meic Stephens concluded that Wilkins "endeavoured, not least in the pages of The Red Dragon, ... to create in the English language a readership with sympathies like his own, and for that attempt, some fifty years before it became feasible, he deserves to be remembered".

== Works ==
Wilkins' major historical works are:

- The History of Merthyr Tydfil (1867,1908)
- Wales, Past and Present (1870) (The History of Wales for Englishmen)
- Tales and Sketches of Wales (1879,1880)
- The History of the Literature of Wales from 1300 to 1650 (1884)
- The History of Newport (1886)
- The South Wales Coal Trade and Its Allied Industries (1888)
- The History of the Iron, Steel, Tinplate and Other Trades of Wales (1903).

Wilkins' other writings include:

- Storm and Calm (1870, fiction)
- Old John: John Bull's Father and the Green Island Far Out at Sea: Being the Welshman's Reply to "The Times" (1877, pamphlet)
- Buried Alive: A Narrative of Suffering and Heroism, Being the Tale of the Rhondda Colliers, with Further Details (1877) (The Inundation of Tynewydd, booklet)
- A Relic of Roman Catholic Days in Wales (1877)
- Robert Fitzhamon: An Historical Romance of Glamorgan (1880, fiction)
- To be Sold by Auction (1881, fiction)
- A Memorial Sketch of the Visit of the Marquess of Salisbury to Newport, Mon. (1886) (The Salisbury Memorial: Gwent in the Old Days, The Morgan Family)
- Ivor Bach: A Tale of the Twelfth Century (c. 1890)
- Kilsanos: A Tale of the Welsh Mountains (1895, fiction)
- Merthyr Tydfil Illustrated: (including Aberdare, Dowlais and the Beacons) (1903, Edward J. Burrow ed.)
- Historical sketches of the Bute family, Noteworthy Men and Women of Wales (newspaper series), Welsh Industries (newspaper series), and Health and Holiday Resorts (newspaper series)
- numerous Red Dragon articles (1882–1885) such as: biographies of notable Welsh people, Summer Holidays in Wales, Shakespeare in Wales, The Shipping of Wales, Pioneers of the Welsh Iron Ore Industry.

== Other sources ==
- "The Miners' Provident Fund for South Wales". Western Mail. 15 September 1879. p. 2 – via Welsh Library Online. (Wilkins researched and suggested an insurance scheme for miners)
- "The Historian of the Welsh Coal Trade". Western Mail. 31 July 1890. p. 3. (Honoured by Geological Society)
- "The '97 Esteddfod. Should be Held at Merthyr. Interview with Mr. Charles Wilkins". Merthyr Times. 11 April 1895. p. 5. (Wilkins regarded as a literary authority)
- "Mr Charles Wilkins, F.G.S., Merthyr". Papur Pawb. 3 April 1897. p. 4. (Biography with portrait, in Welsh)
- "The Retirement of Mr. Charles Wilkins". Evening Express. 8 February 1898. p. 2. (Details of Wilkins' retirement function and presentation)
- "Presentation to Merthyr's Literary Ex-Postmaster, Mr. Charles Wilkins". The Merthyr Times. 11 February 1898. p. 6. (Further details, includes a photograph)
- "The Testimonial to Mr Charles Wilkins, F.G.S.". South Wales Daily News. 1 December 1898. p. 3. (Praise for Wilkins' work)
- "List of Subscriptions to the Testimonial Presented to Mr Charles Wilkins". The Merthyr Times. 21 April 1899. p. 4. (Subscribers include Marquess of Bute. Lord Tredegar, Sir W. T. Lewis, etc.)
- "Literary Associations of Merthyr Tydfil". Merthyr Express. 17 April 1909. p. 8 – via Welsh Library Online.(Lists Wilkins' main achievements)
- "Merthyrian Bibliography. 49. The History of Merthyr. By Charles Wilkins". Merthyr Express. 13 August 1910. p. 12 – via Welsh Library Online. (Includes a brief literary biography)
- "Former Postmaster at Merthyr". Western Mail. 5 August 1913. p. 10. (Includes a photograph)
- Wilkins, Charles (1994). "Recollections of three Merthyr artists". Merthyr Historian. 7:126–135.
- Roberts, Brynley F. (2001). "Charles Wilkins the Historian of Merthyr Tydfil". Merthyr Historian. 12:1–19.
- Wilkins, John (2001). "Charles Wilkins, writer, 1830–1913: A Biographical Note by his Great Grandson". Merthyr Historian. 13:5–18.
- Wilkins, John V. (2011). "A Scrap of Autobiography by Charles Wilkins, Annotated by his Great Grandson John V. Wilkins". Merthyr Historian. 22:141–150.
