= Insole Court =

Building in Llandaff, Cardiff, Wales

Coordinates: 51.4939°N 3.2264°W

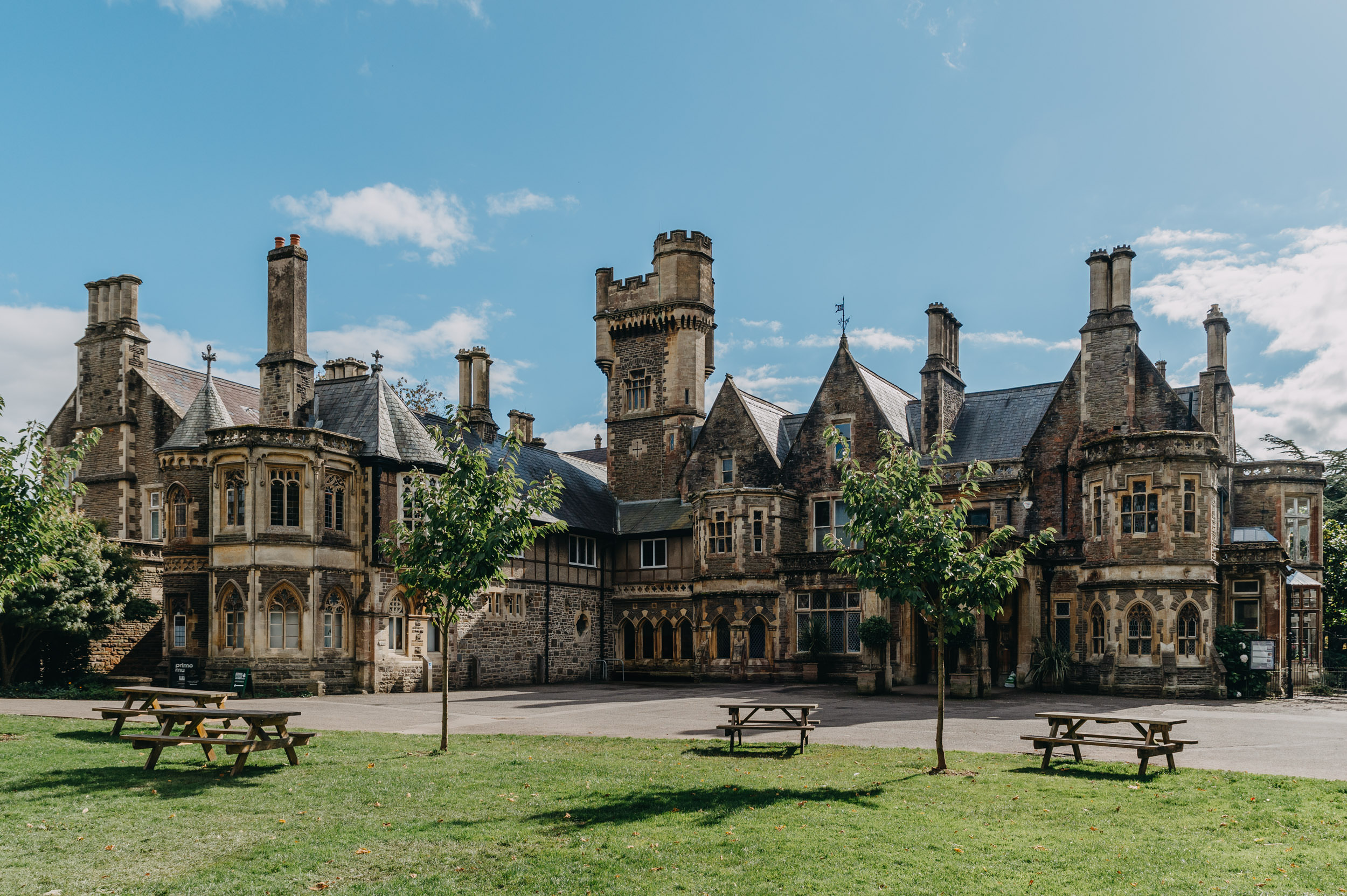
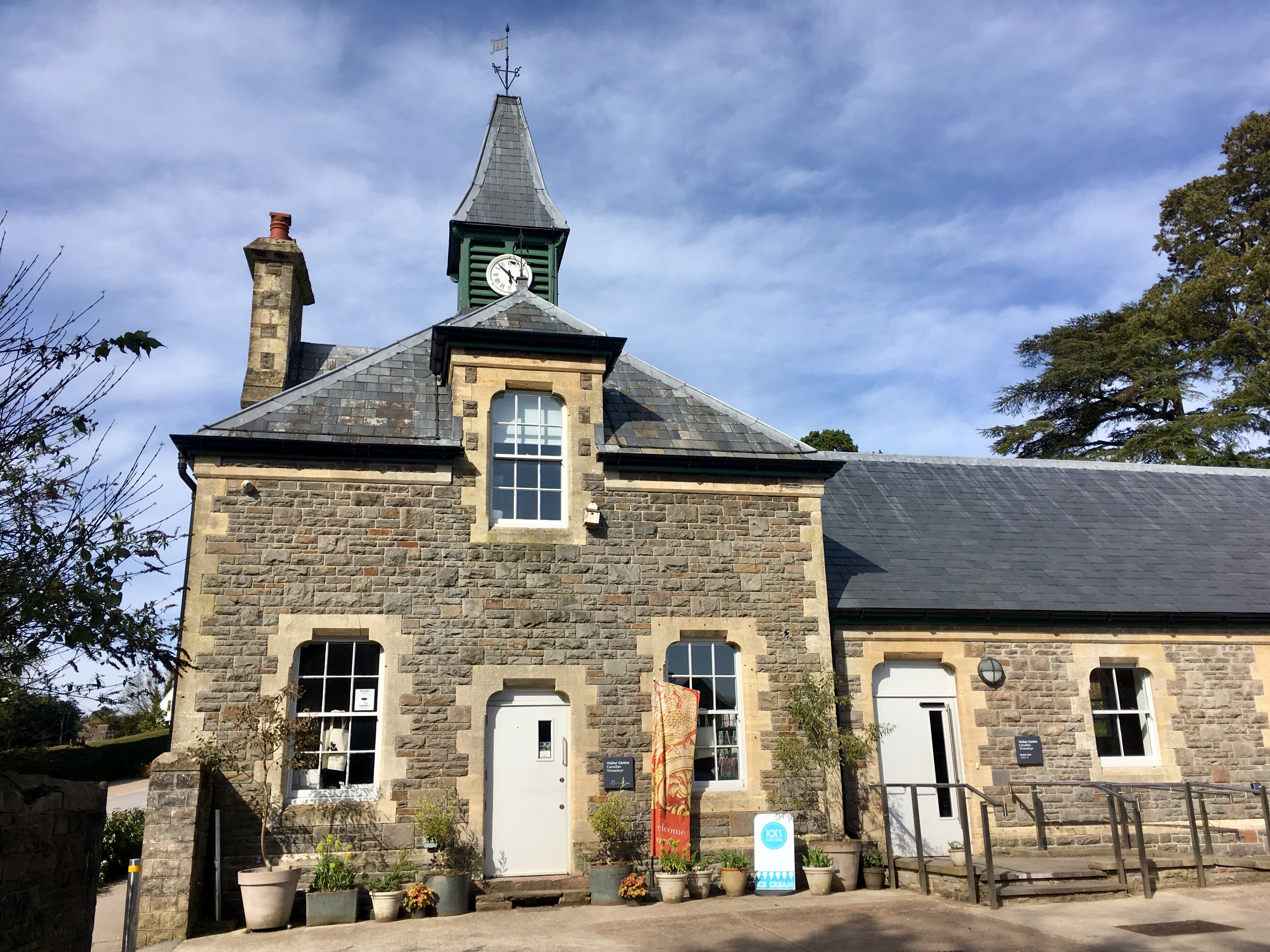
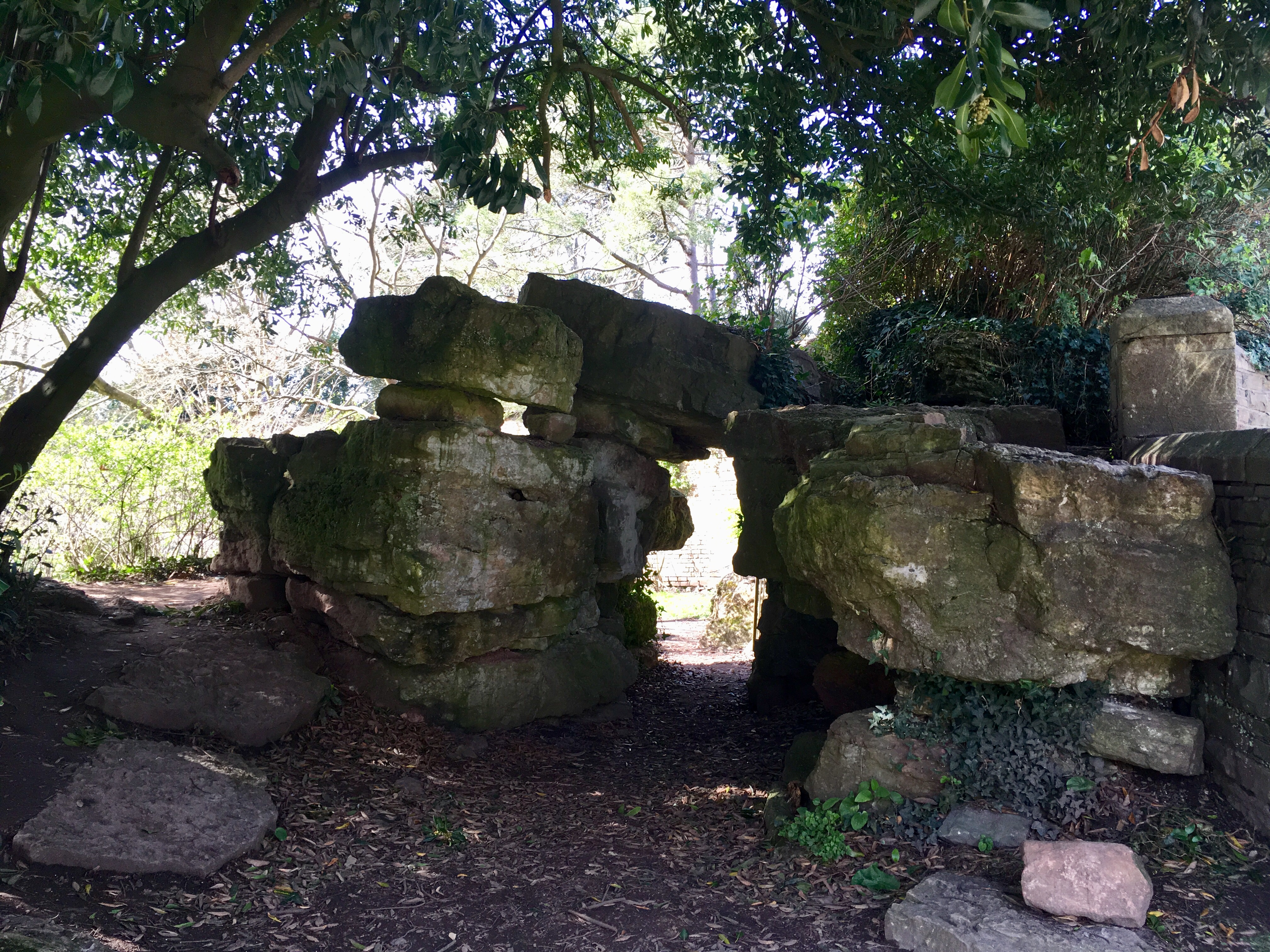
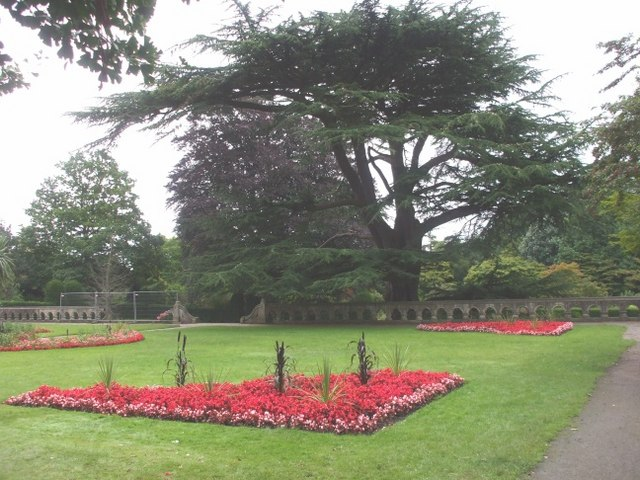
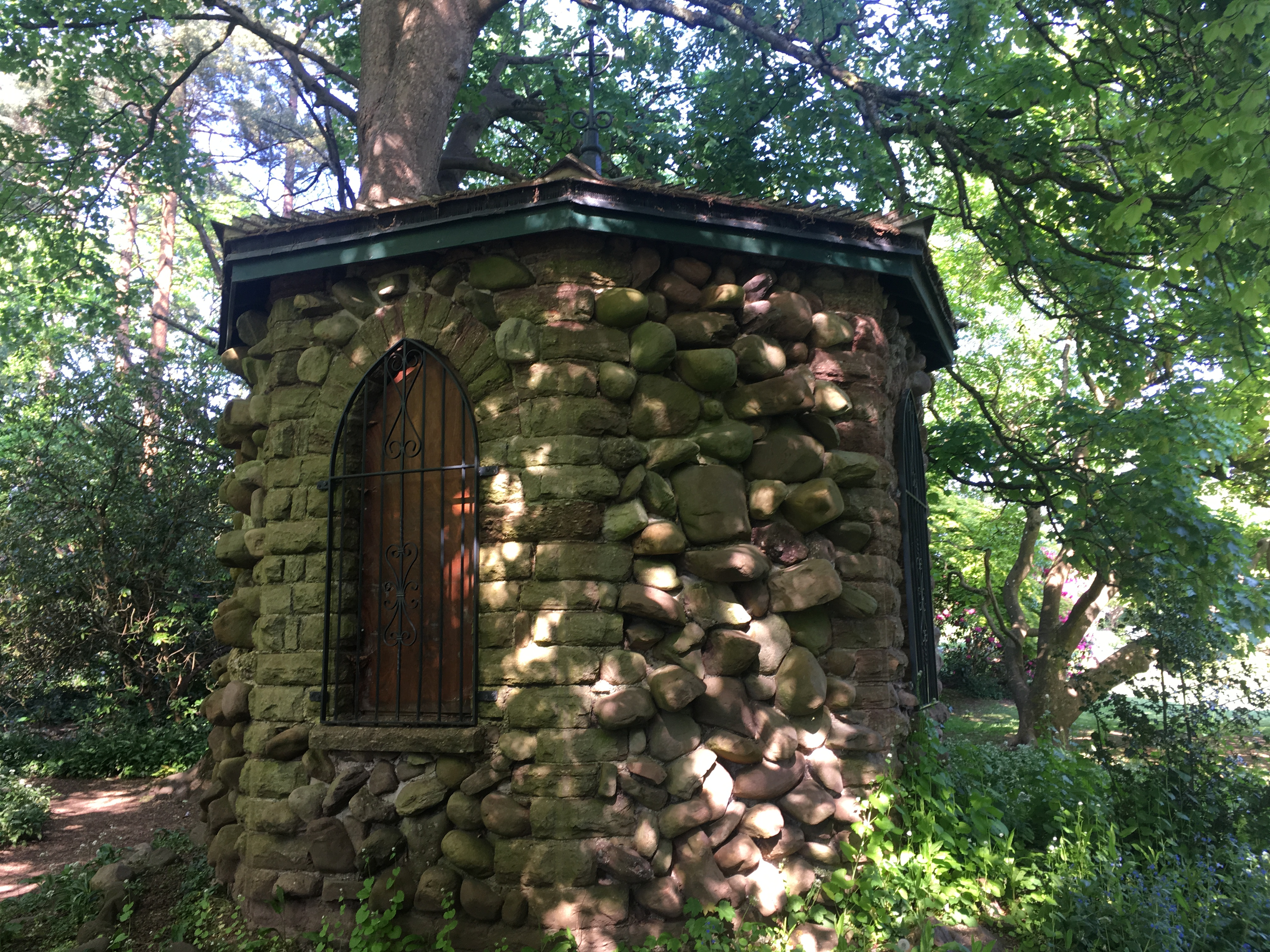
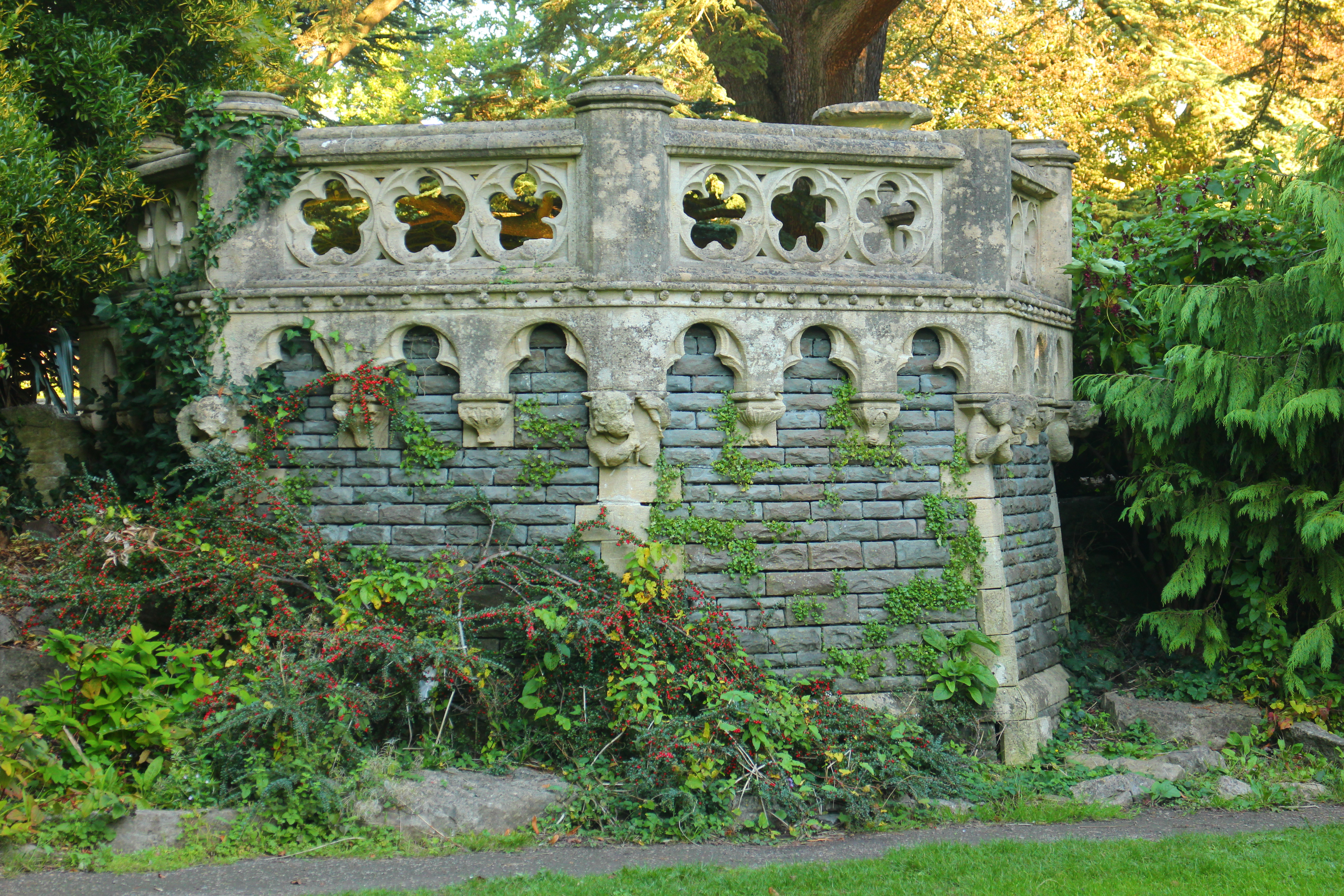
- Listed buildings within Insole Court Insole Court (Grade II*) Stable Block (Grade II) Rock Arch (Grade II) Ornamental gardens (Grade II*) Garden House (Grade II) Terrace Wall (Grade II)
- Interactive map of the Insole Court area
- Former names: Ely Court, The Court, Llandaff Court

General information
- Architectural style: Gothic revival
- Location: Llandaff, Cardiff, Wales
- Opened: 1856
- Cost: £10,000
- Client: James Harvey Insole
- Owner: Cardiff Council

Technical details
- Floor count: 4 (3 + basement)

Renovating team
- Architects: W G & E Habershon (1855); George Robinson (1873); Edwin Seward (1875)

Other information
- Parking: Free onsite parking

Website
- http://www.insolecourt.org

Cadw/ICOMOS Register of Parks and Gardens of Special Historic Interest in Wales
- Official name: Insole Court
- Designated: 1 February 2022; 4 years ago
- Reference no.: PGW(Gm)27(CDF)
- Listing: Grade II*

Listed Building – Grade II*
- Official name: Insole Court
- Designated: 26 March 1976; 50 years ago
- Reference no.: 14127

Insole Court (Welsh: Cwrt Insole) is a Grade II* Listed Victorian Gothic mansion in Llandaff, Cardiff, Wales, built for wealthy businessman James Harvey Insole (1821 Worcester - 1901 Llandaff) and dating back to 1855.

The mansion and Stable Yard are operated by a registered charity, the Insole Court Trust, who began operating the site in 2016. After an extensive refurbishment, the ground floor of the mansion reopened to the public in September 2017. In 2018, the first floor opened to the public for the first time, with an exhibition, 'This House is a Stage' that tells the story of the Insole family.

The site hosts daily classes and activities, as well as a The Potting Shed Café and room hire facilities. The mansion is free to visit and is open every day.

== Insole family ==
The Insole family lived on the site from 1856 to 1938. They had extensive coal-mining interests across the South Wales Coalfield, particularly the colliery at Cymmer, Rhondda Cynon Taf, and were closely involved in the development of the Barry Railway Company and the associated docks. Their growing prosperity enabled them to invest in land, including a site within the ancient Cathedral-city of Llandaff, between roads leading to Fairwater and Ely.

== Building ==
The original building was designed by W G & E Habershon and built in 1855 for James Harvey Insole, who commissioned a modest double-fronted building, named Ely Court. There was also a lodge built on Fairwater Road to house the family's coachman and his family.

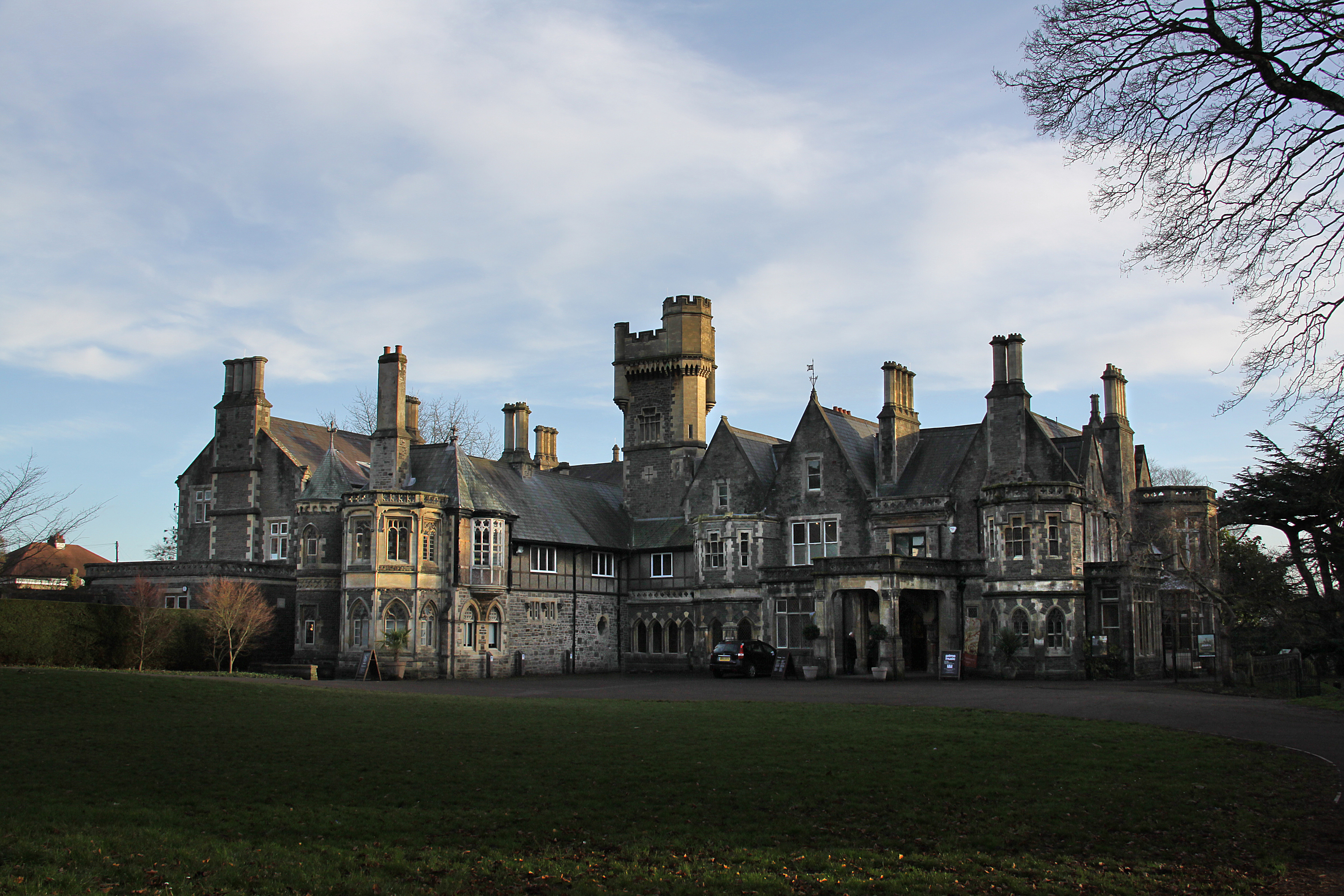
Front view of Insole Court

But as the family's fortunes rose, reflecting those of Cardiff itself, two major extensions developed the building into the modern Insole Court. In the 1870s James Harvey commissioned George Robinson and Edwin Seward to change the appearance of the building into the Gothic Revival architecture-led works reminiscent of those of Lord Bute's architect William Burges on Cardiff Castle. These works also included the addition in 1874 of a neo-Gothic tower, similar to the clock tower which Burges had added to the castle in 1869. Insole's tower contained a smoking room at the very top.

The second development in 1906 - the height of the family's fortune - was undertaken on the instructions of George Frederick Insole (James Harvey's son, usually known as Fred), to extend and modernise the building. Rooms were enlarged and panelled, a new guest wing erected, central heating and electrical distribution inserted, and a large carriage porch was added.

After World War I, in the light of Winston Churchill's decision to change the firing of the Royal Navy to oil and the loss of many European markets, the South Wales coal industry began to decline. The family's fortunes suffered a similar downturn, with the deaths of Fred, in 1917, and his son Claud, in 1918 whilst on war service in France. The house passed to Eric, who lived there with his mother, Jessy, and sister, Violet (who died in 1932).

In the 1930s Cardiff Council were looking to develop an orbital road system around the city. To facilitate the creation of Western Avenue the Council bought the entire 57 acres (23 ha)-acre estate in 1932 for £26,250 under a compulsory purchase order. The remaining family members were allowed to continue living in the house as tenants. However, the Council redeveloped much of the estate lands as housing, leaving just the mansion and ornamental gardens. With World War II fast approaching, the last of the Insoles - Eric and his mother Jessy - finally vacated the property in March 1938.

During World War II Insole Court was the regional Air Raid Warden HQ, and housed the Royal Observer Corps and Auxiliary Fire Service for Cardiff district. After the war, the upper floors were converted into self-contained flats and let to council employees and others. The ground floor housed a branch library, and a wide variety of adult education classes and community activities.

The Insole Court house became Grade II* heritage listed in 1992, the Stables Grade II and the gardens included on the Welsh Register of Historic Gardens as Grade II*.

== 21st century ==
Slowly falling into disrepair, despite restoration in 1995, the entire property was closed on health and safety grounds in November 2006. The Council undertook a major restoration of the ground floor, and the house reopened in November 2008.

Insole Court has been used for a variety of classes and societies, and has been open to view by the public on certain days. It has large gardens which are also open to the public. Until June 2014 the building was also home to the head office of the Wales Co-operative Centre.

The Insole Court Trust was awarded £2m funding from the Heritage Lottery Fund and £750,000 from the Big Lottery Fund and Welsh Government, to restore and redevelop Insole Court into a visitor attraction. The £4 million project started in December 2014. During restoration, stencilling and decoration was found on the walls throughout the house, which were believed to date to the 1870s. Newly built room hire facilities, 'The Stable Yard' and the Potting Shed Café opened in September 2016.

On 23 September 2016 Cardiff Council transferred the lease of Insole Court to the Insole Court Trust, a charity created to manage and protect the house. At the time, this was the largest Community Asset Transfer in Wales.

The mansion reopened to the public on 22 July 2017. Currently, the ground floor is open to visitors for free and includes a shop and a Reading Room in the former Smoking Room. The upper floor has an immersive walk-through 'play for voices' which dramatises the family history from their first arrival in Cardiff to the last members departing in the 1930s. Ongoing conservation and restoration work of other parts of the upper floors is continuing.
