= Cymmer, Rhondda Cynon Taf =

Cymmer: Welsh: Y Cymer
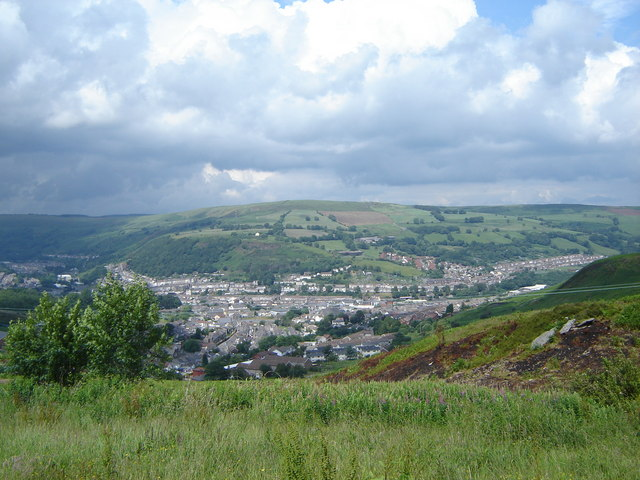

- Location within Rhondda Cynon Taf
- Population: 4,807 (2011)
- OS grid reference: ST0290
- Principal area: Rhondda Cynon Taf
- Preserved county: Mid Glamorgan
- Country: Wales
- Sovereign state: United Kingdom
- Post town: PORTH
- Postcode district: CF39
- Dialling code: 01443
- Police: South Wales
- Fire: South Wales
- Ambulance: Welsh
- UK Parliament: Rhondda
- Senedd Cymru – Welsh Parliament: Rhondda
- List of places UK Wales Rhondda Cynon Taf 51°36′54″N 3°23′49″W Community map: Map of the community

Cymmer (Welsh: Y Cymer) is a village and community in the Rhondda Valley, Wales. It is so named because of being located at the 'confluence' of the Rhondda Fawr and Rhondda Fach river valleys. Several collieries were opened here in the middle part of the nineteenth century. A coal mine disaster in 1856 resulted in 114 casualties, and the lack of payment of any compensation to the miners' families caused bitter feelings in the community.

== Location ==
Cymmer is located in the lower Rhondda Valley about halfway between Treorchy and Pontypridd. It is situated on the A4119 road half a mile from its junction with the A4058 road. Neighbouring settlements are Penygraig, Trealaw, Tonypandy, Dinas Rhondda, Llwyncelyn and Porth. Cymmer comprises the villages of Trehafod, Trebanog, Britannia, Glynfach and Cymmer itself.

== History ==
George Insole and his son James Harvey Insole owned the mineral rights to the land at Cymmer. Several collieries were sunk in the vicinity, namely Cymmer Colliery (Old No. 1 Pit) (1847), Glynfach Colliery (1851), New Cymmer Colliery (1855), Upper Cymmer Colliery (1851) and Ty-Newydd Colliery (1852), not to mention the several other collieries of Porth and Trehafod. In 1856 the Old Pit mine was the site of a mining disaster in which 114 men and boys were killed. The official inquest into the deaths found that inadequate ventilation had caused a build up of gas which was ignited by the use of naked flames underground, and the inquest jury brought in an indictment of manslaughter against the mine manager and four officials. However, at the ensuing trial at the Spring Assizes in Swansea in 1857, the cases against two were dismissed, the judge directed the jury to discharge one of the others and advised them to acquit the remaining two, which they did. The Cymmer community seethed with rancour and the bitter feelings lasted for many years. No compensation was paid to the families of the miners concerned.

The writer and broadcaster Gwyn Thomas (1913–1981) was born and brought up in Cymmer.

== Governance ==
Glamorgan County Council 1889–1974 Cymmer Division councillors pre-WWI
Year	Councillor (*elevated to aldermanic bench)	Party
1889	Dr Henry Naunton Davies* Dr Evan Naunton Davies	Liberal Liberal
1892	Moses Moses* Idris Williams (d. 1894)	Lib-Lab Liberal
1895	Dr Henry Naunton Davies	Liberal
1898	Morgan Williams	Liberal
1901	Morgan Williams	Liberal
1904	Morgan Williams	Liberal
1907	Morgan Williams	Liberal
1910	Morgan Williams	Liberal
1913	Morgan Williams	Liberal

Prior to 1889 local government had been carried out by unelected magistrates, often wealthy industrialists and landowners. Under the Local Government Act 1888, from 1889 to 1974 the Cymmer division elected one councillor to the Glamorgan County Council.

The council was abolished under the Local Government Act 1972 in 1974, after which the region was administered by the Mid Glamorgan County Council until 1996.

Under the Local Government (Wales) Act 1994 the Rhondda Cynon Taf County Borough Council was established in 1996 and included the Cymmer electoral ward. The population of this ward at the 2011 Census was 5,505, also including the neighbouring community of Trehafod. The ward was renamed 'Cymer' from the 2022 local elections.

The Cymmer ward elected two Labour councillors at every election from 1995. This continued in May 2022 with the Labour candidates, Gareth Caple and Ryan Evans, retaining the seats.

== Religion ==
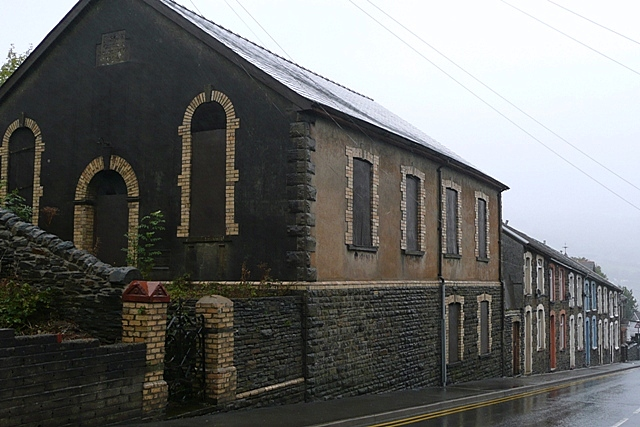
High Street, Cymmer; the A4233 runs past the Welsh Baptist Chapel (Capel Bedyddwyr Cymraeg Pisgah), built in 1894. Still in use in 1998, the chapel is now closed and boarded up

Cymmer Independent Chapel, said to be the first nonconformist chapel in the Rhondda, dates from 1743 and had connections to the revivalist Howel Harris. It was the mother church of all the Congregational chapels in the valley. In 1856, forty-eight victims of the Cymmer Colliery disaster were buried in the chapel graveyard. The chapel building erected in 1834 still survives, though in a dilapidated state and the chapel graveyard was almost completely destroyed in 2005 to accommodate roadworks. A new chapel opened in 1908 but was sold in the 1960s and put to commercial uses.

St John's Church, built in 1888–9, is situated on the hillside above the earlier village of Cymmer which was centred around the Cymmer Chapel.

== Education ==
In the early twenty-first century, there were three schools in the village: Cymmer Infants School, Cymmer Junior School and Ysgol Gyfun Cymer Rhondda. However, proposals put forward in 2015 resulted in the amalgamation of the infants and junior schools to form a new community primary school utilizing the existing site and buildings.
