= Charles Wilkins (chemist) =

American professor of chemistry and biochemistry (1938–2025)

- Born: August 14, 1938; Los Angeles, California, U.S.
- Died: June 27, 2025 (aged 86); Fayetteville, Arkansas, U.S.
- Awards: Tolman Award (1993)

Academic background
- Education: Chapman College (BS); University of Oregon (PhD)

Academic work
- Discipline: Chemistry
- Sub-discipline: Biochemistry; Analytical chemistry
- Institutions: University of Arkansas; University of California, Riverside; University of Nebraska–Lincoln

Charles Lee Wilkins (August 14, 1938 – June 27, 2025) was an American chemist who is a distinguished professor of chemistry and biochemistry at the University of Arkansas and the founding director of the University of Arkansas Statewide Mass Spectrometry Facility.

== Background ==
Wilkins was born in California on August 14, 1938. He earned a Bachelor of Science degree from Chapman College and a PhD from the University of Oregon.

Wilkins died after a short illness in Fayetteville, Arkansas, on June 27, 2025, at the age of 86.

== Career ==
Wilkins was a distinguished professor of chemistry at the University of California, Riverside and a chemistry professor at the University of Nebraska–Lincoln. In 1993, Wilkins was a recipient of the Tolman Award.

With Michael Gross, he built the second Fourier transform ion cyclotron resonance mass spectrometer and they were the first to use it for analytical applications. In November 2020, Wilkins was selected as the chief editor of the International Journal of Analytical Chemistry.
