= James Harvey Insole =

South Wales coal owner and shipper (1821–1901)

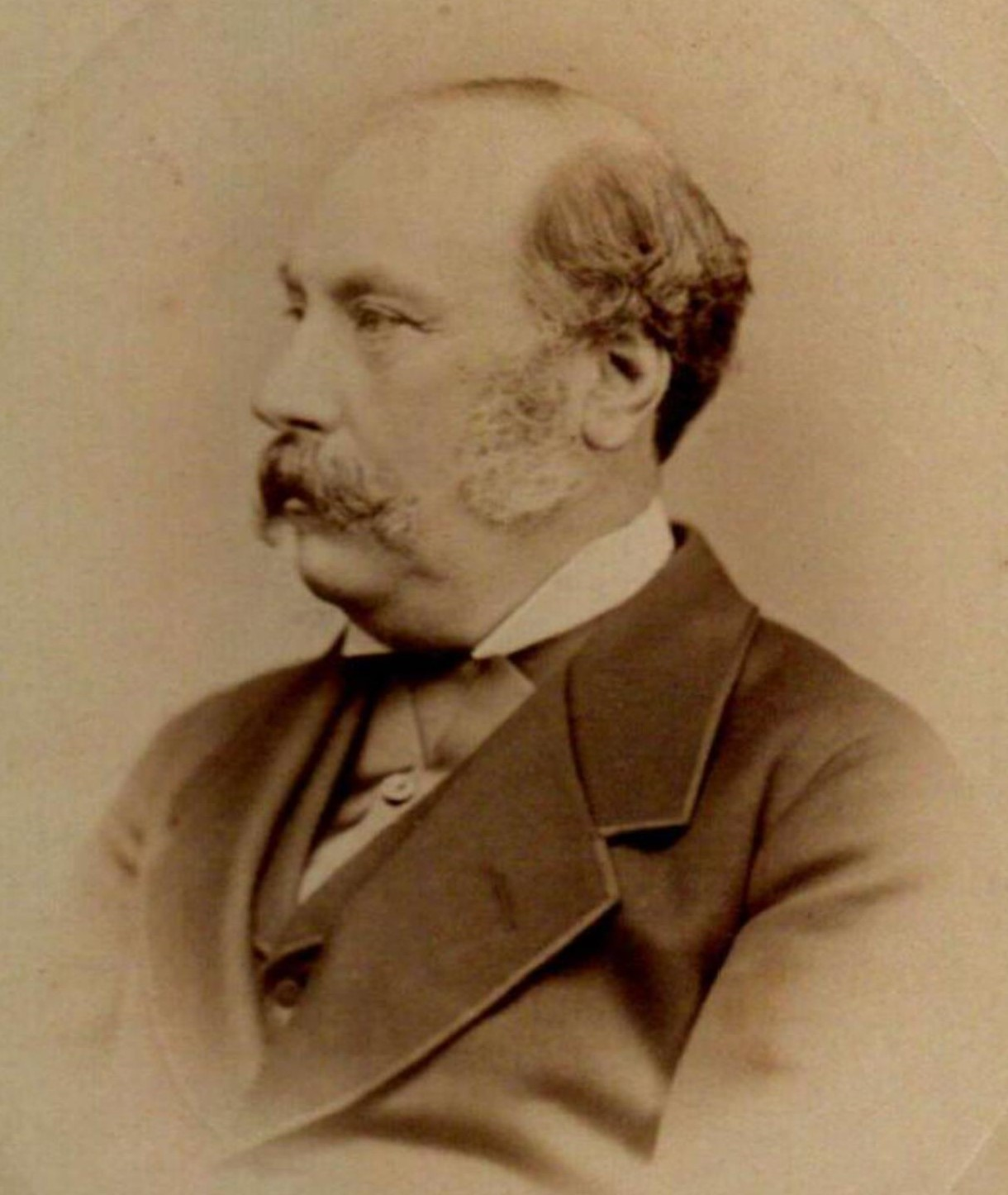
- Born: 30 April 1821; Worcester, Worcestershire, England
- Died: 20 January 1901 (aged 79); Llandaff, Glamorgan, Wales
- Burial place: Llandaff Cathedral, Llandaff, Glamorgan, Wales
- Occupation: Colliery proprietor
- Known for: Consolidation and development of the family's extensive South Wales coal business; development of Cardiff, Wales, as a coal shipping port; Insole Court
- Spouse(s): Mary Ann Jones (m. 1843–1882); Marian Louisa Carey née Eagle (m. 1890–1901)
- Parent: George Insole

James Harvey Insole JP (30 April 1821 – 20 January 1901) was an English businessman who consolidated and developed the extensive South Wales coal mining and shipping business begun by his father George Insole.

Insole became a partner in his father's business in 1842. They leased and revived the Cymmer (lower Rhondda Valley) bituminous coal pits in 1844 and developed their coastal and international markets together. When his father died in 1851, Insole took sole control of the company. Disaster struck in 1856 when an underground explosion of gas at the Cymmer mine resulted in a "sacrifice of human life to an extent unparalleled in the history of coal mining of this country". In 1862 Insole purchased the Abergorki mine in the upper Rhondda Valley. His company continued to develop the rich steam coal seams of the Rhondda and by the end of that century was one of the main exporters of South Wales steam coal. The company operated until 1940.

Insole also played a significant role in the development of Cardiff, Wales, as a coal shipping port, especially in connection with improving the means of loading coal ships and the construction of the new dock at Penarth which opened in 1865.

Among other civic roles, as a justice of the peace Insole served as magistrate for both Cardiff and Glamorgan. He was also the inaugural president of the Cardiff Chamber of Commerce and he and his company made significant contributions to public causes including education and health.

Insole's modern legacy survives in his Victorian mansion Ely Court in Llandaff, Wales, now a community resource known as Insole Court which is used for a wide range of activities and events.

== Early life ==
James Harvey Insole was born on 30 April 1821 in Worcester, Worcestershire, and was baptised at St Helen's Church, Worcester, on 2 May 1821. He was the second child and eldest son of the six children of George Insole and Mary Insole (née Finch). During Insole's early childhood his father was a carpenter in Worcester and the family was associated with the Angel Street Independent (Congregational) Meeting House. In 1828 the family moved to Cardiff where Insole's father began building his South Wales coal mining and shipping business. Insole attended schools in Cardiff and Melksham, Wiltshire.

When Insole came of age in 1842 he received a bequest from his father's uncle, a wealthy saddler's ironmonger in Birmingham. In 1843 Insole married Mary Ann Jones in Edgbaston. She was the daughter of his father's uncle's business partner. They had three children, two sons and a daughter. The family lived in Crockherbtown, Cardiff, next door to Insole's parents, until 1852.

== Coal producer ==
In 1842 Insole's father brought him into partnership as George Insole & Son, colliery proprietors and coal shippers. At that time they were working the steam coal seam at the Maesmawr pit (Llantwit Fardre), but the seam was reaching exhaustion. They then leased and revived bituminous coal pits at Cymmer (Lower Rhondda Valley) in 1844, and in 1848 opened 36 coking ovens to supply the Taff Vale Railway Company.

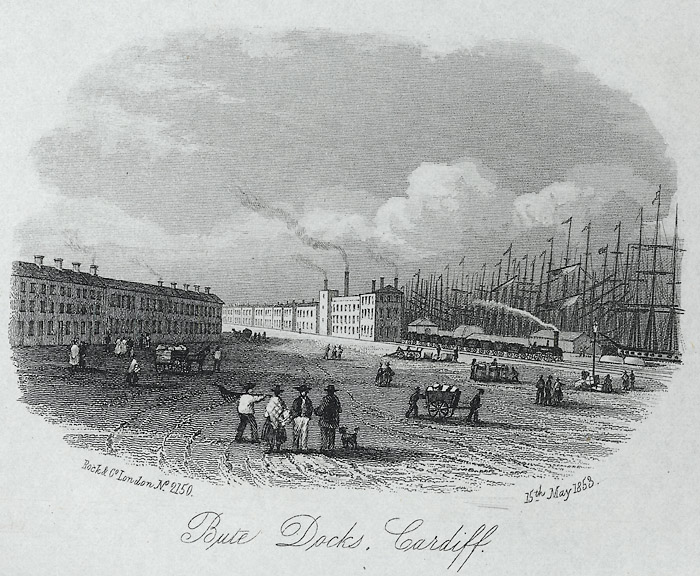
Bute Dock (West), Cardiff, in 1853, where Insole had his commercial offices

Insole had also suggested that the Taff Vale Railway Company negotiate with Lord Bute to erect coal staiths on the Cardiff Bute Dock (West). In 1848, when the first coal tip was ready, the Insoles became the first to load a ship at Cardiff by "mechanical appliances".

Up to 1847 the Insoles mainly supplied the coastal markets of the Bristol Channel (Bristol, Gloucester), the Cornish ports (St. Ives, Penzance, Fowey), and the Irish markets (Limerick, Dublin, Youghal, Waterford, Cork) with steam coal. Subsequently, they supplied the French markets, first Brest and Nantes, then Calais, Marseilles, and Corsica. In 1849 they sent coal shipments to the Mediterranean, the Near East (Alexandria, Constantinople, Beirut, Smyrna), to South America (Montevideo, Rio Grande, Rio de Janeiro), and as far as Chile and Singapore.

Insole took sole control of the business on his father's death in 1851. Aged twenty-nine, he was "a typical thrustful Victorian entrepreneur" and in that year he sank the Upper Cymmer Colliery, followed by the New Cymmer Colliery in 1855.

=== Cymmer disaster ===
The Crimean War made 1855 a boom year for coal and Insole began intensive excavation of his Cymmer Old Pit. In the early morning of 15 July 1856 an underground explosion of gas resulted in the deaths of 114 men and boys (thirty-four under the age of sixteen and fifteen under the age of twelve). It was described as a "sacrifice of human life to an extent unparalleled in the history of coal mining of this country". The local communities were also devastated by the disaster as almost all the working-age men and boys perished and thirty-five widows and ninety-two children, as well as other dependent relatives, were suddenly left without any immediate means of support.

The ensuing coroner's inquest determined the cause of the deaths to have been "the post-explosion effects of afterdamp or methane poisoning". The evidence indicated that the explosion was due to defective mine ventilation and the use of naked flames underground, despite warnings from HM Inspector of Mines, Herbert Francis Mackworth, who stated that "the explosion arose from the persons in charge of the pit neglecting the commonest precautions for the safety of the men and the safe working of the colliery".

Insole stated that he took "no part in the management", knew nothing of the duties of firemen or the problems of ventilation, did not refuse expenditure for safety, and could not recall having been sent any official documentation on mine safety. Insole was dismissed from the enquiry and, after further legal proceedings, he and his mine officials were exonerated from all blame. The apparent contradiction in Insole's evidence given at the inquest and the later assizes was criticised. At the inquest, Insole claimed his mine manager was "intrusted with the entire control" as he was "one of the most competent mining engineers in this district". Insole walked free but his manager was charged with manslaughter. At the assizes, in support of his manager and when his own "personal liberty [was] no longer at stake", Insole then claimed the man was "not a person skilled as an underground man or engineer", and his manager was acquitted.

Welsh historian E. D. Lewis' analysis of the disaster concludes:

It was the success of [the Cymmer Old Pit mine] when developed with such inordinate speed and recklessness by ... James Harvey Insole that led directly to the terrible mining disaster of 1856. Possibly the legal processes of the time were insufficient to punish those who were culpable, but of the moral responsibility of owner and officials, even when judged against the background of their own time and place, there can be no question.

Insole, described in The Cardiff and Merthyr Guardian as "the greatest sufferer in a pecuniary sense", contributed £500 (approximately equivalent to £46,600 in 2025) to the Relief Appeal Fund "in aid of the widows and orphans, and dependent relatives of the deceased" and undertook to meet the cost of the thirty graves opened at the Cymmer Independent Chapel.

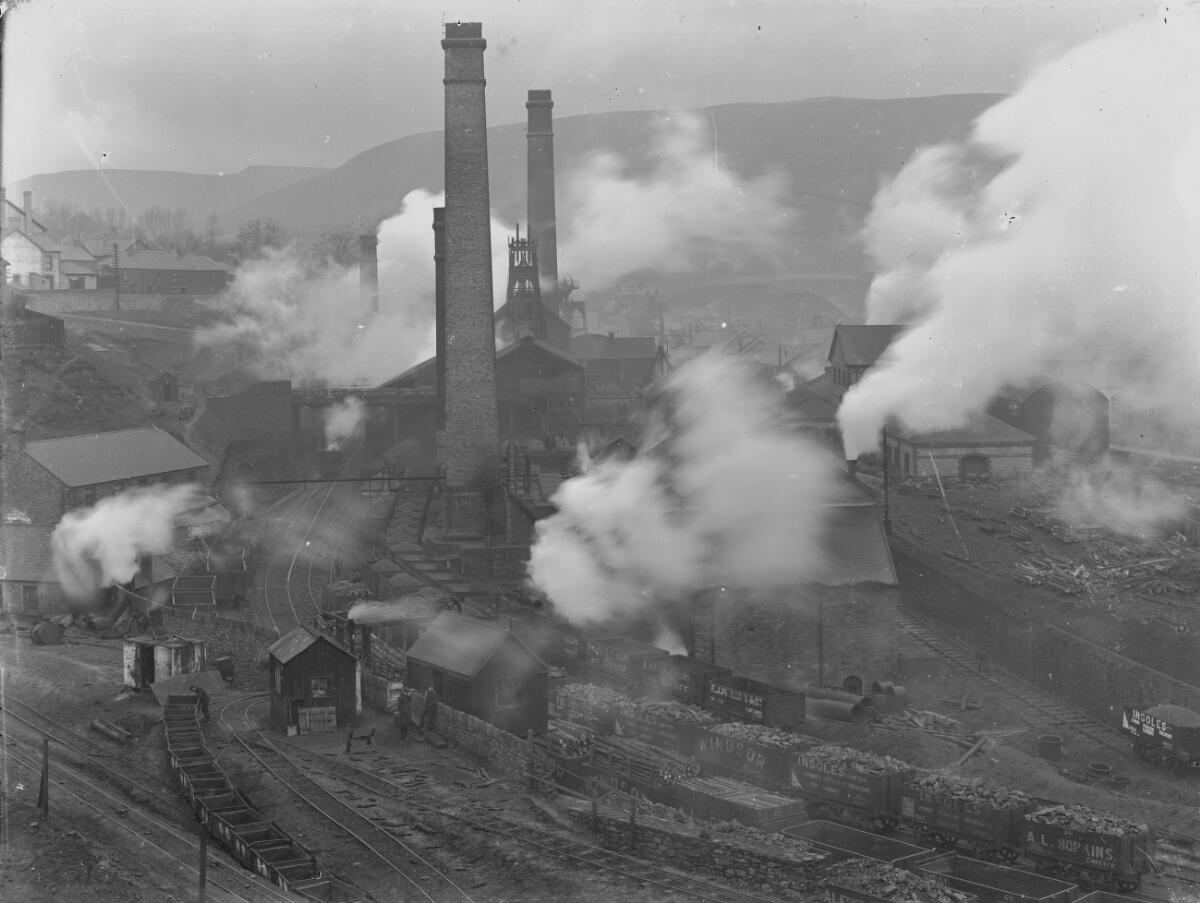
Cymmer Colliery, Rhondda Valley, c. 1905, with wagons labelled "Insoles"; also see this view of the colliery, c. 1860s, which possibly includes Insole and family members

=== Post 1856 ===
The Cymmer Old Pit continued in operation until 1939. To ensure his supply of steam coal, in 1862 Insole purchased the Abergorki Level at the top of the Rhondda Valley. In 1865 the Penarth Harbour, Dock and Railway Company, of which Insole was one of the original directors, opened the new dock at Penarth in competition with the congested Bute Docks. The Cymmer mine was deepened in 1875–1877 to reach four rich seams of steam coal. By the end of the century Insole's company was again one of the chief exporters of South Wales steam coal. The company remained in business until 1940. Although still maintaining an interest in the industry, Insole had effectively retired from direct involvement in his company by 1875.

== Gentrification ==
Coat of arms of James Harvey Insole
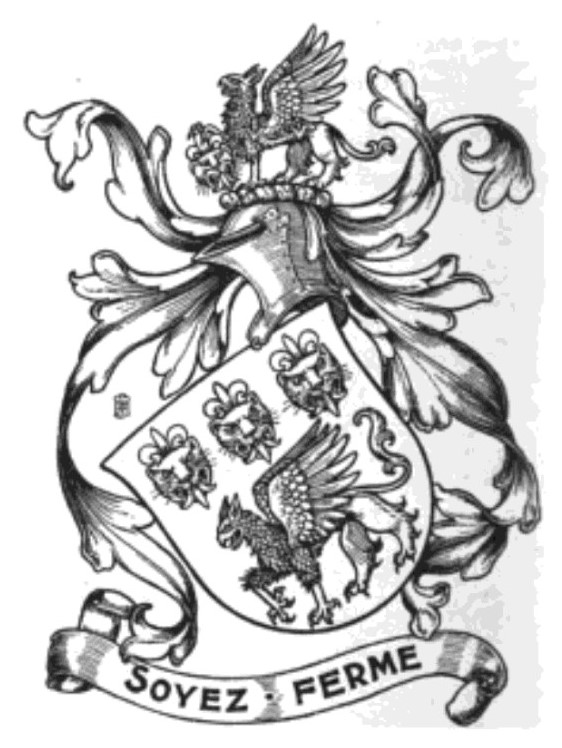
- Adopted: 15 April 1872 (H. Coll.)
- Crest: Upon a wreath of the colours, a griffin passant or, charged on the body with two pheons and resting the dexter claw on a leopard's face jessant-de-lys azure
- Shield: Azure, a griffin passant, in chief three leopards' faces jessant-de-lys or
- Motto: Soyez Ferme (Be Steadfast)
- Other elements: Mantling azure and or Livery blue, with yellow facings

Insole used his wealth to obtain social status. Following the death of his father in 1851 Insole moved his family two miles out of Cardiff to the healthier and increasingly fashionable city village of Llandaff. In 1855 building started on Ely Court, a three-storey twin-gabled villa set in a large garden and approached by an imposing carriage drive. Over the next twenty-five years Insole acquired much of the surrounding land to create an extensive park. In the 1870s the house was extended and embellished in the neo-Gothic style that had been employed by William Burges to transform Cardiff Castle for Lord Bute.

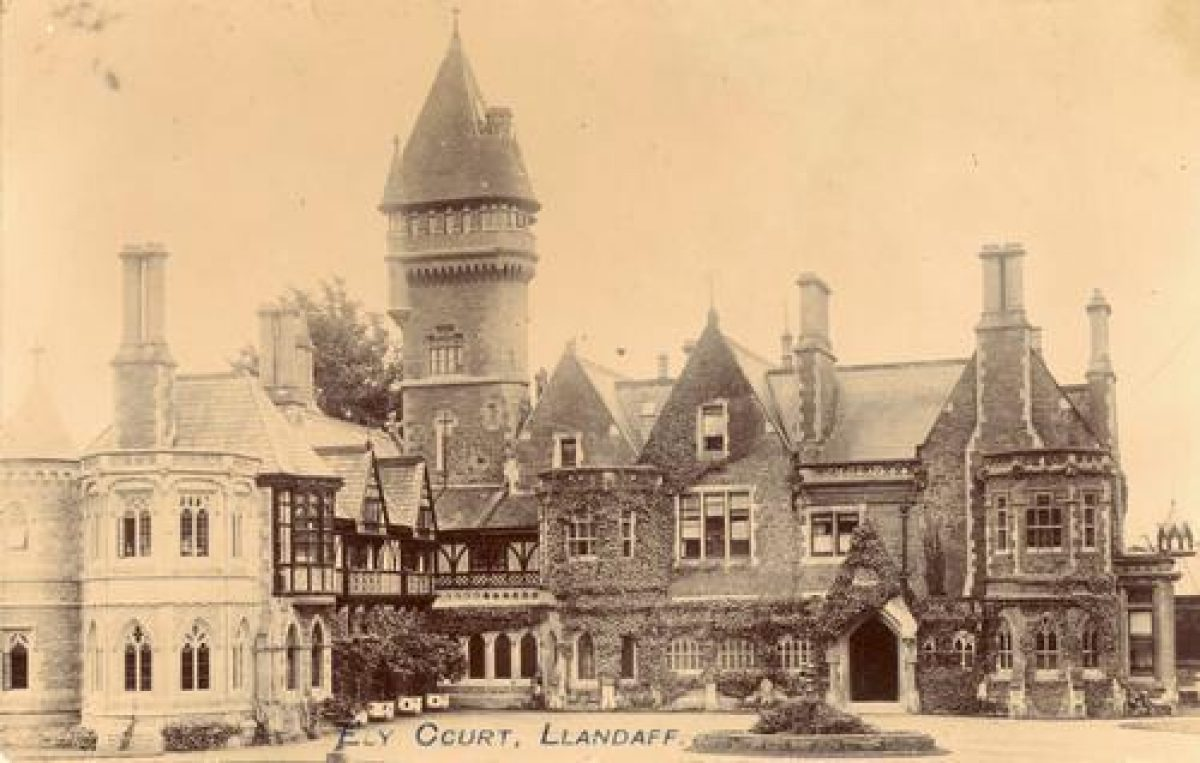
Ely Court, Llandaff, c. 1900 (north front). Insole built the original twin-gabled villa in 1855 and 1856, extensively renovated and enlarged it in the 1870s, and added a further extension (left of picture) in 1898 and 1899.

Insole already owned several estates in Glamorganshire as well as land in Cardiff when he set out to build a land-owning dynasty. In 1872, then semi-retired, he acquired armorial bearings from the College of Heralds. Three years later, he purchased the 7,291 acre Luxborough estate in Somerset, including the "picturesque and commodious shooting box", Chargot House (or Lodge), numerous farms and cottages, and "thriving woods and plantations, together with a large tract of moor". Insole was then able to style himself as "Lord of the Manors of Luxborough and Withiel Florey". In 1878 he was listed in Kelly's Handbook to the Upper Ten Thousand.

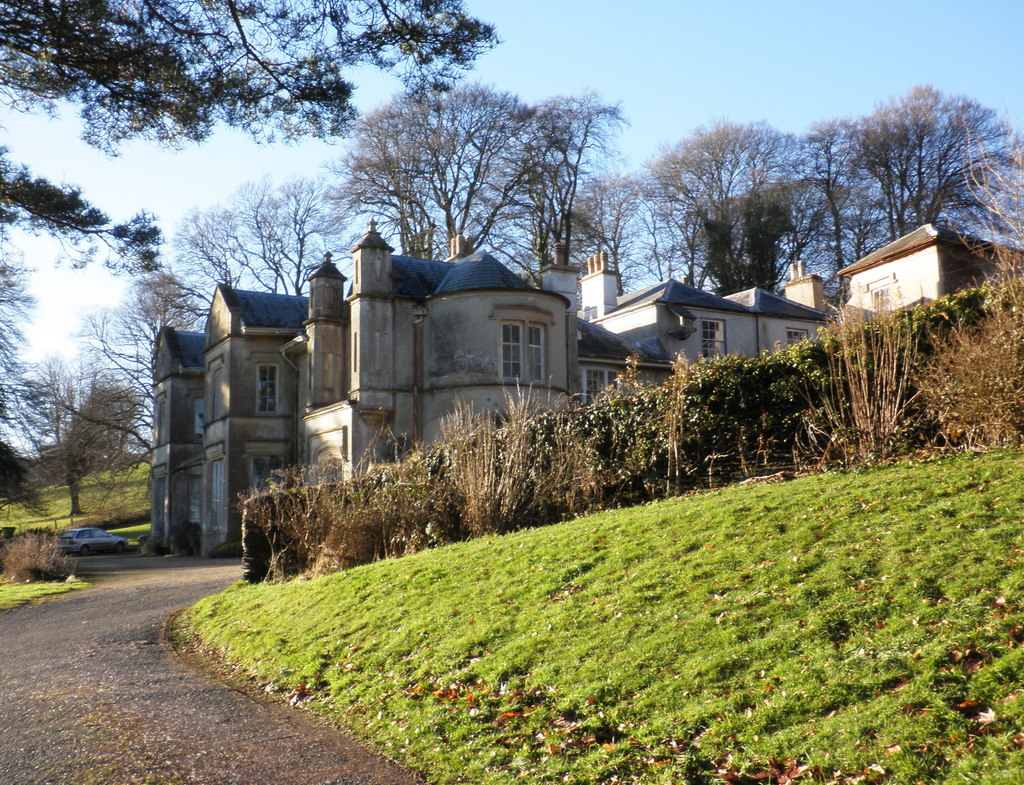
Chargot House, Luxborough, Somerset, on the Luxborough Estate purchased by Insole in 1875 (modern view)

Insole regularly entered plants he and his gardeners had cultivated in horticultural shows, competing successfully against other local gentlemen and their gardeners. He devoted over forty years to:

improving his gardens and estates in different parts of the country, but more especially his unique residence and home at Ely Court. ... Mr. Insole studied horticulture and agriculture deeply, and was therefore always ready to give anything new a trial upon his garden or land. ... [W]hen the once famous Glamorganshire Horticultural Society existed, he was an ardent supporter both as a subscriber and exhibitor.

In 1882 Ely Court was described as "the leading residence in the locality".

Insole also collected paintings and objets d'art. In 1881 several of his bronzes, silver items and paintings were exhibited at the Cardiff Fine Art and Industrial Exhibition.

=== Philanthropy ===
Insole and his company's names were to be found in published lists of subscribers to good causes. In 1882 he announced a subscription of £1,000 for the proposed University College of South Wales and Monmouthshire in Cardiff and provided a £25 per annum scholarship for a Cardiff student to pursue further studies. In 1883 a ward at the Cardiff Royal Infirmary was renamed the Insole Ward in recognition of his donation of £1,000. In 1890 Insole's company announced a £250 contribution over five years towards the funding and maintenance of the new University College engineering department and from 1892 the J. H. Insole scholarship provided £25 per annum for three years to support a University College student of mining.

Although he was associated with the Congregational Church as a boy and in later life financed Nonconformist building projects, as an adult Insole was a noted churchman and his tenants knew him as a generous patron of the parish church at Withiel Florey, of which he held the advowson.

== Other activities ==
Civic and other roles: Cardiff street commissioner (1848); justice of the peace and magistrate for Cardiff (1856); land tax commissioner for Glamorgan (1856/1857); vice consul to Spain at Cardiff (1858); inaugural president of the Cardiff Chamber of Commerce (1866); magistrate for Glamorgan (1867); member of the Pall Mall Club.

Insole held company directorships with: Penarth Harbour, Dock and Railway Company; Ely Valley Railway Company; Patent Fuel Works; Cardiff Hotel Company; Cardiff Baths Company.

== Remarriage, death, and legacy ==
A Pioneer of Cardiff's Trade – Mr Insole was one of the pioneers in the development of Cardiff as a port for the shipment of coal.

— Evening Express, 21 January 1901

Mr. Insole ... [took] an active part in the development of the [coal] trade, and by his knowledge and skill did much to assist in laying the foundation for the vast industry to which the success of Cardiff owes so much.

— Western Mail, 24 September 1888

[B]ut of the moral responsibility of [the Cymmer mine] owner ... there can be no question.

— E. D. Lewis, "The Cymer Explosion"

Insole was widowed in 1882. In 1890 he married Marian Louisa Carey (née Eagle), the widowed daughter of his former Dublin agent and sister-in-law of his eldest son who lived nearby in his Pencisely House mansion.

Insole died on 20 January 1901, aged 79, at his residence Ely Court, Llandaff, and was buried at the Llandaff Cathedral burial grounds on 24 January 1901. His estate was valued at £245,388 (approximately equivalent to £26,077,000 in 2025).

Insole's death was overshadowed by the death of Queen Victoria two days later, but his numerous obituaries praised his contributions to the South Wales coal industry and the development of Cardiff as a shipping port (the loss to the horticultural world also being noted). and his funeral was attended by many Cardiff dignitaries and businessmen.

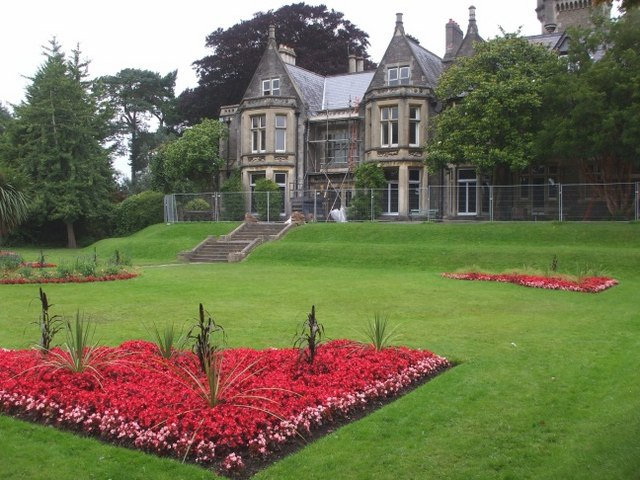
Insole Court (south front) in 2008

Insole's profits were underpinned by the harsh and dangerous working conditions imposed on miners, and these caused the devastating effects of the 1856 Cymmer disaster.

Insole's dynastic land-owning vision came to nought when the Luxborough estate was sold in 1920. The Insole coal company closed in 1940 amidst the general decline of the South Wales coal industry. Ely Court (now Insole Court) passed from family hands in 1932 and eventually fell into disrepair. However, after significant restoration, in 2017 the mansion was reopened to visitors for a wide range of community activities and events, and the gardens that Insole so loved are now a municipal park for public use.

== Selected histories ==
The following accounts include Insole's role in the development of the South Wales coal industry, although each is unreliable in various details, especially regarding his father's origins and early years as a merchant in Cardiff.

- Contemporary Portraits: Men and Women of South Wales and Monmouthshire; Cardiff Section. Cardiff: Western Mail. 1896. p. xxii.
- Lewis, E. D. (1959). The Rhondda Valleys. London: Phoenix House.
- Lewis, E. D. (1976). "Pioneers of the Cardiff Coal Trade", Glamorgan Historian. 11: 22–52.
- Watson, Richard C. (1997). Rhondda Coal, Cardiff Gold: The Insoles of Llandaff, Coal Owners and Shippers. Cardiff: Merton Priory Press.
