= George Insole =

South Wales coal owner and shipper (1790–1851)

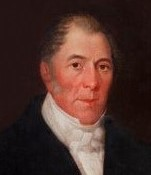
- Born: Worcestershire, England
- Baptised: 5 December 1790
- Died: 1 January 1851 (aged 60); Crockherbtown, Cardiff, Wales
- Burial place: St Margaret's Church, Roath, Cardiff
- Occupations: Colliery proprietor and entrepreneur
- Known for: Pioneering development of the mineral resources of the South Wales coal fields
- Children: James Harvey Insole

George Insole (baptised 5 December 1790 – 1 January 1851) was an English entrepreneur who built an extensive coal mining and shipping business in South Wales.

A younger son of an English tenant farmer in Worcestershire, Insole made judicious use of significant financial assistance from his wider family to move to Cardiff, Wales, in 1828, to enter into partnership there as a brick, timber and coal merchant (1829–1830), and to become an independent coal producer and shipper in 1832. He pioneered the introduction and early success of South Wales steam coal in the London and international markets and his coal contracts underpinned Lucy Thomas's reputation as "the mother of the Welsh steam coal trade".

Insole is claimed to have been the first to supply the London market (1830), the international market (Malta, 1831), and the Royal Navy (1831) with South Wales steam coal. Insole was for many years the largest shipper of steam coal at Cardiff.

== Early life ==
George Insole was baptised in Worcester on 5 December 1790, the fifth of six children of William Insole and Phoebe Insole (née Stinton). During Insole's childhood his father was a tenant farmer in Wichenford, near Worcester. In 1819 he married Mary Finch in Worcester and by 1820 was working there as a carpenter and cabinet maker. They had six children, two sons and four daughters. The two older children were baptised at St Helen's Church, Worcester, but from 1823 to 1827 Insole was associated with the Angel Street Independent (Congregational) Meeting House in Worcester.

== Coal merchant ==
Insole moved to Cardiff in 1828, and by late 1829 was in partnership with Richard Biddle as Insole & Biddle, brick, timber and coal merchants. The move and partnership were supported by family loans and inheritances. Biddle was one of the first agents in Cardiff for Robert Thomas's Waun Wyllt "smokeless" steam coal, sent by barge down the Glamorganshire Canal from Merthyr Tydfil, and had established a customer base in Cardiff prior to partnering with Insole. In 1830 Insole & Biddle had premises at the Wharf on the Glamorganshire Canal at Cardiff.

The Insole & Biddle day book for 1830 records a shipment of 414 tons of Waun Wyllt steam coal to London. This consignment was later claimed to have been the largest cargo of coal ever shipped at the Glamorganshire Canal. The shipment did not make a profit but the quality of the coal eventually made it very popular for both household and Royal Navy use. Insole also developed markets for coal along the Severn Estuary and in Ireland.

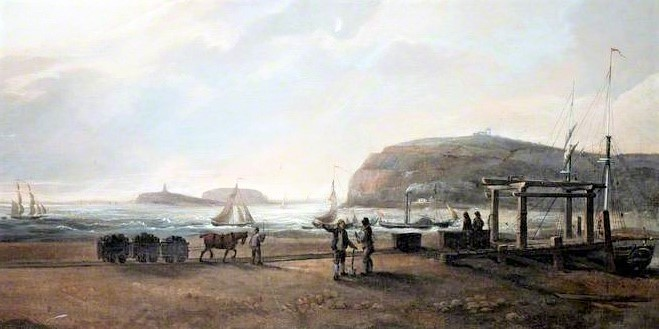
The first coal staiths at Cardiff on the River Taff, 1833, used by Insole to ship his coal from Cardiff

The Insole & Biddle partnership was bankrupted in early 1831. Insole was able to recover his financial position within a few months, and was also left a substantial inheritance that year. From his offices in Cardiff at the mouth of the Glamorganshire Canal, he continued as agent for Waun Wyllt coal, and contracts were written to supply London-based coal merchants. These contracts helped establish the reputation of Welsh coal in the London markets, and were the basis on which Lucy Thomas (widow of Robert) became known as "the mother of the Welsh steam coal trade". Although Thomas has been credited with these ventures, much of the success was due to Insole.

If the beginnings of Cardiff's trade in bituminous coal were due to the entrepreneurial flair of Walter Coffin, without question the pioneer of the port's trade in steam coal was George Insole. ... it was Insole who, in the 'thirties and 'forties of the last [19th] century, for the first time exported steam coal from Cardiff to London, to scattered overseas markets from Malta to Alexandria, and who supplied the British Admiralty.

— E. D. Lewis, "Pioneers of the Cardiff Coal Trade"

While their assertions were not universally accepted, the Insoles claimed to have been the first to supply the London market (in 1830), the international market (Malta, in 1831), and the Royal Navy (in 1831) with South Wales steam coal.

== Coal producer ==
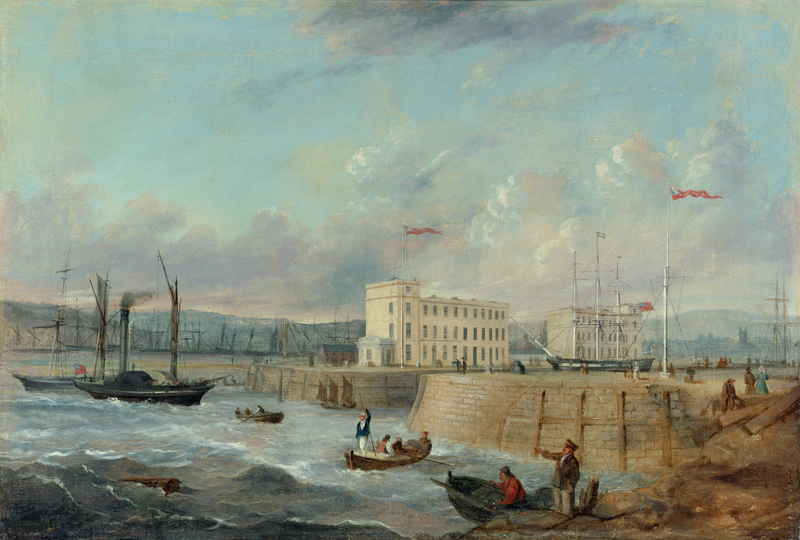
Entrance to the West Docks, Cardiff, in 1840, where Insole had his commercial offices; also see this view of the docks in 1849

In 1832 Insole leased the Maesmawr pit (Llantwit Fardre) to become a coal producer and shipper in his own right. He was one of the first to open offices at the Cardiff Docks when the Bute West Dock was opened in 1839. When his son James Harvey Insole came of age in 1842, Insole took him into partnership as George Insole & Son.

In 1844, as the Maesmawr seam was becoming depleted, they leased and revived collieries at Cymmer and in 1848 opened 36 coking ovens to supply the Taff Vale Railway Company, of which Insole was a principal promoter. Up to 1847 the Insoles mainly supplied the coastal markets of the Bristol Channel (Bristol, Gloucester), the Cornish ports (St. Ives, Penzance, Fowey), and the Irish markets (Limerick, Dublin, Youghal, Waterford, Cork) with steam coal. Insole continued to develop his international trade and afterwards supplied markets in France, the Mediterranean, Southeast Asia and South America and became the largest shipper of steam coal at Cardiff.

In Cardiff, Insole was associated with St John's Church in 1830 (where his daughter was baptised) and afterwards with the independent meetings at the Bethany Baptist Chapel (where his infant son was buried in 1837) and the New Trinity Congregational Chapel (making significant contributions to its rebuilding in 1846). Insole was involved in the introduction of British Schools in Cardiff and served as a town councillor for the South Ward of Cardiff.

== Death and legacy ==
Mr Insole was an enterprising and extensive coal proprietor; and was mainly instrumental in developing the resources of one of the most important mineral districts in this county.

— The Cardiff and Merthyr Guardian, 4 January 1851

Insole died on 1 January 1851, aged 60, at his residence in Crockherbtown, Cardiff. The cause of death was "Disease of Heart many years. Paralysis 1 week". He was buried at St Margaret's Church, Roath on 7 January 1851.

The high regard in which he was held is indicated in the two prize-winning elegies on Insole presented at the 1851 Cymmer Eisteddfod. Insole can be credited with much of the early success of South Wales steam coal in the London and international markets. The firm established by Insole continued in business until 1940.

== Selected histories ==
The following accounts present Insole as a pioneering entrepreneur of South Wales steam coal, although each is unreliable in various details, especially regarding his origins and early years as a merchant in Cardiff. They also overlook Biddle's earlier, independent sourcing of Waun Wyllt steam coal and its introduction by him to the Cardiff market prior to the Insole & Biddle partnership.

- Wilkins, Charles (1888). The South Wales Coal Trade and Its Allied Industries, from the Earliest Days to the Present Time. Cardiff.
- Contemporary Portraits: Men and Women of South Wales and Monmouthshire; Cardiff Section. Cardiff: Western Mail Ltd. 1896. p. xxii.
- Phillips, Elizabeth. "Pioneers of the Welsh Coalfield". Western Mail. 30 December 1924. p. 7.
- Phillips, Elizabeth (1925). A History of the Pioneers of the Welsh Coalfield. Cardiff.
- Morris, J. H.; Williams, L. J. (1957). "R. J. Nevill and the Early Welsh Coal Trade". National Library of Wales Journal. 10 (1): 59–64.
- Morris, J. H.; Williams, L. J. (1958). The South Wales Coal Industry 1841–1875. Cardiff: University of Wales Press.
- Lewis, E. D. (1976). "Pioneers of the Cardiff Coal Trade", Glamorgan Historian. 11: 22–52.
- Watson, Richard C. (1997). Rhondda Coal, Cardiff Gold: The Insoles of Llandaff, Coal Owners and Shippers. Cardiff: Merton Priory Press.
