= 1910–1914 Aberdare Urban District Council elections =

1910 Welsh local government election

The Aberdare Urban District Council was established in 1894 and covered the parish of Aberdare. Its responsibilities included public health, sanitation, roads and public works generally.

There were five wards, namely Aberaman (also known as No. 5 Ward), Blaengwawr (also known as No. 4 Ward), Gadlys (also known as No. 2 Ward), Llwydcoed (also known as No. 1 Ward), and the Town Ward (also known as No. 3 Ward). Originally, one member was elected from each ward on an annual basis, but from 1904 an additional member was granted to each ward, resulting in the election of ten members, out of a total of twenty, every three years. At the intervening election, one member continued to be elected.

In 1914, on the eve of the Great War, elections took place for an additional seven seats on the council, taking the total membership of the council to 27. No further elections were held until 1919

== 1910 Aberdare Urban District Council election ==
An election was held in April 1910. It was preceded by the 1909 election and followed by the 1911 election. The term of office of members elected at the 1907 election came to an end and those elected were to serve until 1913.

(*) denotes sitting member

=== Aberaman Ward (two seats) ===
Aberaman Ward 1910
Party	Candidate	Votes	%	±%
	Edmund Mills Hann*	1,226		
Labour	Illtyd Hopkins*	1,022		
Labour	Joseph Wigley	644		

=== Blaengwawr Ward (two seats) ===
Blaengwawr Ward 1910
Party	Candidate	Votes	%	±%
Labour	David Davies*	unopposed		
Labour	E. Stonelake*	unopposed		

=== Gadlys Ward ===
Gadlys Ward 1910
Party	Candidate	Votes	%	±%
	Thomas Lewis*	852		
	Henry Evans	812		
Labour	Idwal Thomas	597		
Ind. Labour Party	Evan Parker	345		

=== Llwydcoed Ward (two seats) ===
Llwydcoed Ward 1910
Party	Candidate	Votes	%	±%
	T. Walter Williams*	1,155		
	Rees Llewellyn*	1,034		
	W.T. Harries	244		

=== Town Ward (two seats) ===
Town Ward 1910
Party	Candidate	Votes	%	±%
	A.P. Jones	1,109		
	David Price Davies*	986		
Labour	W.T. James	414		

== 1911 Aberdare Urban District Council election ==
An election was held in April 1911. The retiring members had been elected in 1908. There were contested elections in two of the five wards.

=== Aberaman Ward ===
Aberaman Ward 1911
Party	Candidate	Votes	%	±%
Labour	John Davies*	Unopposed		
		Swing		

=== Blaengwawr Ward ===
Blaengwawr Ward 1911
Party	Candidate	Votes	%	±%
Liberal	John Howell	790		
Labour	Tom Bowen*	592		

=== Gadlys Ward ===
Gadlys Ward 1911
Party	Candidate	Votes	%	±%
Liberal	George Powell	747		
Labour	Idwal Thomas	642		
		Swing		

=== Llwydcoed Ward ===
Llwydcoed Ward 1911
Party	Candidate	Votes	%	±%
	M.J. Harries*	Unopposed		

=== Town Ward ===
Town Ward 1911
Party	Candidate	Votes	%	±%
	Lewis Noah Williams*	Unopposed		
		Swing		

== 1912 Aberdare Urban District Council election ==
Three of the five wards were contested with Labour retaining two seats and the Independents one.

=== Aberaman Ward ===
Aberaman Ward 1912
Party	Candidate	Votes	%	±%
Labour	William Rees*	unopposed		

=== Blaengwawr Ward ===
Blaengwawr Ward 1912
Party	Candidate	Votes	%	±%
Labour	D. Jackson Thomas*	unopposed		

=== Gadlys Ward ===
Gadlys Ward 1912
Party	Candidate	Votes	%	±%
Labour	Idwal Thomas	709		
	James H. James*	537		

=== Llwydcoed Ward ===
Llwydcoed Ward 1912
Party	Candidate	Votes	%	±%
	J.O. George	Unopposed		

=== Town Ward ===
Town Ward 1912
Party	Candidate	Votes	%	±%
	W. Thomas*	Unopposed		

== 1913 Aberdare Urban District Council election ==
An election was held on 7 April 1913. In Gadlys, Thomas Lewis, recently elected unopposed to Glamorgan County Council, lost his seat to Labour after Edmund Stonelake, who previously represeneted Blaengwawr, switched wards. Lewis's defeat was attributed not only to a feeling that he could not effectively serve as a county and district councillor but also the fact that he was estranged from many of his fellow members at Ebenezer chapel, who refused to support him.

=== Aberaman Ward (two seats) ===
Aberaman Ward 1913
Party	Candidate	Votes	%	±%
Independent	Edmund Mills Hann*	1,333		
Labour	Illtyd Hopkins*	550		
Liberal	Philip Rees	464		
Labour	J.T. Norman	435		
Conservative	Henry Davies	427		

=== Blaengwawr Ward (two seats) ===
Blaengwawr Ward 1913
Party	Candidate	Votes	%	±%
Liberal	Evan Jones	822		
Labour	David Davies*	632		
Labour	D.E. Davies	630		

=== Gadlys Ward ===
Gadlys Ward 1913
Party	Candidate	Votes	%	±%
Liberal	E. Ogwen Williams	709		
Labour	Edmund Stonelake*	649		
Liberal	Thomas Lewis*	584		

=== Llwydcoed Ward (two seats) ===
Llwydcoed Ward 1913
Party	Candidate	Votes	%	±%
Independent	T. Walter Williams*	Unopposed		
Independent	Rees Llewellyn*	Unopposed		

=== Town Ward (two seats) ===
Town Ward 1913
Party	Candidate	Votes	%	±%
Independent	A.P. Jones*	Unopposed		
Independent	David Price Davies*	Unopposed		

== 1914 Aberdare Urban District Council election ==
An election was held in April 1914. The retiring members had been elected in 1908. There were contested elections in two of the five wards.

=== Aberaman Ward ===
Aberaman Ward 1911
Party	Candidate	Votes	%	±%
Labour	John Davies*	Unopposed		
		Swing		

=== Blaengwawr Ward ===
Blaengwawr Ward 1911
Party	Candidate	Votes	%	±%
Liberal	John Howell	790		
Labour	Tom Bowen*	592		

=== Gadlys Ward ===
Gadlys Ward 1911
Party	Candidate	Votes	%	±%
Liberal	George Powell	747		
Labour	Idwal Thomas	642		
		Swing		

=== Llwydcoed Ward ===
Llwydcoed Ward 1911
Party	Candidate	Votes	%	±%
	M.J. Harries*	Unopposed		

=== Town Ward ===
Town Ward 1911
Party	Candidate	Votes	%	±%
	Lewis Noah Williams*	Unopposed		
		Swing		

== 1914 Aberdare Urban District Council by-elections ==
Elections for seven additional members; three in the Aberaman Ward and one in each of the other four wards, were held a few days before the outbreak of the Great War.

=== Aberaman Ward ===
Aberaman Ward 1914 by-election (three seats)
Party	Candidate	Votes	%	±%
Independent	Joseph Martin	1,260		
Labour	Evan Jones	961		
Labour	John Evans	700		
Independent	Henry Williams	655		
Labour	John Davies	630		

=== Blaengwawr Ward ===
Blaengwawr Ward 1914 by-election
Party	Candidate	Votes	%	±%
Independent	W.R. Morgan	784		
Labour	William Lawrence	438		

=== Gadlys Ward ===
Gadlys Ward 1914 by-election
Party	Candidate	Votes	%	±%
Liberal	T.W. Griffiths	718		
Labour	Enoch Jones	555		

=== Llwydcoed Ward ===
Llwydcoed Ward 1914
Party	Candidate	Votes	%	±%
Labour	John Griffiths	626		
Liberal	Thomas Lewis	531		

=== Town Ward ===
Town Ward 1914 by-election
Party	Candidate	Votes	%	±%
Independent	William Haggar	438		
Independent	Richard Morgan	364		
Labour	J.H. Bruton	258		
Independent	Mrs Richards	207		

== Bibliography ==
- Jones, Ieuan Gwynedd (1981). Explorations & Explanations. Essays in the Social History of Victorian Wales. Llandysul: Gomer. ISBN 0 85088 644 9.
- Jones, Ieuan Gwynedd (1987). Communities. Essays in the Social History of Victorian Wales. Llandysul: Gomer. ISBN 0 86383 223 7.
- Morgan, Kenneth O (1991). Wales in British Politics 1868-1922. Cardiff: University of Wales Press. ISBN 0708311245.
- Parry, Jon (1989). "Labour Leaders and Local Politics 1888-1902: The Example of Aberdare". Welsh History Review. 14 (3): 399–416.
