= 1909 Aberdare Urban District Council election =

1909 Welsh local government election

The Aberdare Urban District Council was established in 1894 and covered the parish of Aberdare. Its responsibilities included public health, sanitation, roads and public works generally.

There were five wards, namely Aberaman (also known as No. 5 Ward), Blaengwawr (also known as No. 4 Ward), Gadlys (also known as No. 2 Ward), Llwydcoed (also known as No. 1 Ward), and the Town Ward (also known as No. 3 Ward). At this time, one member was elected from each ward on an annual basis.

An election was held in April 1909. It was preceded by the 1908 election and followed by the 1910 election. The term of office of members elected at the 1906 election came to an end and those elected were to serve until 1912.

Four of the five wards were uncontested, with Labour candidates becoming increasingly the dominant force as they took a seat at Gadlys for the first time.

(*) denotes sitting member

== Results by ward ==
=== Aberaman Ward ===
Aberaman Ward 1909
Party	Candidate	Votes	%	±%
Labour	William Rees*	unopposed		

=== Blaengwawr Ward ===
Blaengwawr Ward 1909
Party	Candidate	Votes	%	±%
Labour	D. Jackson Thomas*	unopposed		

=== Gadlys Ward ===
Gadlys Ward 1909
Party	Candidate	Votes	%	±%
Labour	W. Harper	709		
	James H. James*	537		

=== Llwydcoed Ward ===
Llwydcoed Ward 1909
Party	Candidate	Votes	%	±%
	J.O. George	unopposed		

=== Town Ward ===
Town Ward 1909
Party	Candidate	Votes	%	±%
	W. Thomas*	unopposed		

== Bibliography ==
- Jones, Ieuan Gwynedd (1981). Explorations & Explanations. Essays in the Social History of Victorian Wales. Llandysul: Gomer. ISBN 0 85088 644 9.
- Jones, Ieuan Gwynedd (1987). Communities. Essays in the Social History of Victorian Wales. Llandysul: Gomer. ISBN 0 86383 223 7.
- Morgan, Kenneth O (1991). Wales in British Politics 1868-1922. Cardiff: University of Wales Press. ISBN 0708311245.
- Parry, Jon (1989). "Labour Leaders and Local Politics 1888-1902: The Example of Aberdare". Welsh History Review. 14 (3): 399–416.
