= 1906 Aberdare Urban District Council election =

1906 Welsh local government election

The Aberdare Urban District Council was established in 1894 and covered the parish of Aberdare. Its responsibilities included public health, sanitation, roads and public works generally.

There were five wards, namely Aberaman (also known as No. 5 Ward), Blaengwawr (also known as No. 4 Ward), Gadlys (also known as No. 2 Ward), Llwydcoed (also known as No. 1 Ward), and the Town Ward (also known as No. 3 Ward). At this time, one member was elected from each ward on an annual basis.

An election was held in April 1906. It was preceded by the 1905 election and followed by the 1907 election. The term of office of members elected at the 1903 election came to an end and those elected were to serve until 1909.

Three of the five wards were contested, with Labour candidates returned unopposed at Aberaman and Blaengwawr. The election was not said to have been fought on political lines with a backlash against retiring members.

(*) denotes sitting member

== Results by ward ==
=== Aberaman Ward ===
Aberaman Ward 1906
Party	Candidate	Votes	%	±%
Labour	William Rees*	unopposed		

=== Blaengwawr Ward ===
Blaengwawr Ward 1906
Party	Candidate	Votes	%	±%
Labour	D. Jackson Thomas*	unopposed		

=== Gadlys Ward ===
Gadlys Ward 1906
Party	Candidate	Votes	%	±%
	James H. James	635		
Lib-Lab	Thomas Lewis*	624		

=== Llwydcoed Ward ===
Llwydcoed Ward 1906
Party	Candidate	Votes	%	±%
	J.O. George	746		
Labour	Edward Davies	484		

=== Town Ward ===
Town Ward 1906
Party	Candidate	Votes	%	±%
	W. Thomas	947		
Lib-Lab	R.L. Berry*	419		
	F.E. Stansfield	53		
	D. Richards	16		

== Bibliography ==
- Jones, Ieuan Gwynedd (1981). Explorations & Explanations. Essays in the Social History of Victorian Wales. Llandysul: Gomer. ISBN 0 85088 644 9.
- Jones, Ieuan Gwynedd (1987). Communities. Essays in the Social History of Victorian Wales. Llandysul: Gomer. ISBN 0 86383 223 7.
- Morgan, Kenneth O (1991). Wales in British Politics 1868-1922. Cardiff: University of Wales Press. ISBN 0708311245.
- Parry, Jon (1989). "Labour Leaders and Local Politics 1888-1902: The Example of Aberdare". Welsh History Review. 14 (3): 399–416.
