= 1919-45 Aberdare Urban District Council elections =

The Aberdare Urban District Council was established in 1894 and consisted of the ancient parish of Aberdare. It took over the former responsibilities of the Aberdare Local Board of Health which had been in place since the 1850s. The responsibilities of the new authority included public health, sanitation, roads and public works generally.

The authority consisted of the five wards of Aberaman (also known as No. 5 Ward), Blaengwawr (also known as No. 4 Ward), Gadlys (also known as No. 2 Ward), Llwydcoed (also known as No. 1 Ward), and the Town Ward (also known as No. 3 Ward). Initially, each ward had three members, with one member was elected from each ward on an annual basis after the initial election of 1894. In 1904 an additional member was granted to each ward, resulting in the election of ten members, out of a total of 27. As the population of the Urban District continued to grow, an additional seven seats were created. Three of these were in the Aberaman Ward and one each in the other four wards.

== 1919 Aberdare Urban District Council election ==
At the first election held following the Great War, two candidates were elected from each of the five wards. There were contests in four of the five wards. There were no changes to the political complexion of the council following the results.

=== Aberaman Ward (two seats) ===
Aberaman Ward 1919
Party	Candidate	Votes	%	±%
Independent	Edmund Mills Hann*	1,968		
Labour	Illtyd Hopkins*	1,499		
Independent	Gomer Thomas	721		

=== Blaengwawr Ward (two seats) ===
Blaengwawr Ward 1919
Party	Candidate	Votes	%	±%
Labour	David Davies*	Unopposed		
Liberal	Evan Jones*	Unopposed		

=== Gadlys Ward ===
Gadlys Ward 1919
Party	Candidate	Votes	%	±%
Liberal	E. Ogwen Williams*	1,285		
Labour	Edmund Stonelake*	1,236		
Independent	D. Morris Powell	782		

=== Llwydcoed Ward (two seats) ===
Llwydcoed Ward 1919
Party	Candidate	Votes	%	±%
Independent	D.R. Llewellyn*	2,133		
Independent	Mrs A.N. Jenkins	1,501		
Labour	Isaac Edwards	707		

=== Town Ward (two seats) ===
Town Ward 1919
Party	Candidate	Votes	%	±%
Independent	Abel P. Thomas	862		
Independent	David James	790		
Independent	R.L. Berry	720		
Labour	Mrs F. Rose Davies	569		
Labour	Ben Brace	383		
Independent	John Davies	359		

== 1920 Aberdare Urban District Council election ==
A total of twelve candidates were to be elected; four in the Aberaman ward and two in each of the other wards. Llwydcoed ward was uncontested and the retiring members returned unopposed. Labour won two setas at Gadlys; the successful candidates included Rose Davies who became the first woman member of the council. In contrast, the party lost a seat in Aberaman.

=== Aberaman Ward (four seats) ===
Aberaman Ward 1920
Party	Candidate	Votes	%	±%
Independent	Joseph Martin*	2,176		
Labour	Owen Powell*	1,845		
Labour	E. Jones*	1,819		
Independent	Augustus Davies	1,541		
Labour	John Evans*	1,371		
Independent	W. Thomas	1,325		

=== Blaengwawr Ward (two seats) ===
Blaengwawr Ward 1920
Party	Candidate	Votes	%	±%
Discharged Soldiers	Rees Williams	1,230		
Labour	S. Davies	894		
Labour	D.E. Davies*	891		
Independent	James Jenkins	703		
Independent	Dan Hughes	409		

=== Gadlys Ward ===
Gadlys Ward 1920
Party	Candidate	Votes	%	±%
Labour	Ben Brace	1,114		
Labour	Mrs Rose Davies	1,097		
Independent	W.K. Thomas	809		
Independent	George Powell*	799		

=== Llwydcoed Ward (two seats) ===
Llwydcoed Ward 1920
Party	Candidate	Votes	%	±%
Labour	John Griffiths*	Unopposed		
Independent	W.M. Llewellyn*	Unopposed		

=== Town Ward (two seats) ===
Town Ward 1920
Party	Candidate	Votes	%	±%
Independent	R.D. Williams*	1,190		
Independent	R.L. Berry	1,137		
Independent	Rev J.A. Lewis	820		
Discharged Soldiers	J. Edwards	769		
Labour	Fred Davies	490		
Labour	W.T. James	369		

== 1921 Aberdare Urban District Council election ==
One member was to be returned for each ward; this was the first election for the retiring members to contest given that the 1915 and 1918 elections had not been held. All members were returned unoppposed.

=== Aberaman Ward ===
Aberaman Ward 1921
Party	Candidate	Votes	%	±%
Labour	William Rees*	unopposed		

=== Blaengwawr Ward ===
Blaengwawr Ward 1921
Party	Candidate	Votes	%	±%
Labour	William Lawrence*	unopposed		

=== Gadlys Ward ===
Gadlys Ward 1921
Party	Candidate	Votes	%	±%
Labour	Idwal Thomas*	Unopposed		

=== Llwydcoed Ward ===
Llwydcoed Ward 1921
Party	Candidate	Votes	%	±%
Independent	J.O. George*	Unopposed		

=== Town Ward ===
Town Ward 1921
Party	Candidate	Votes	%	±%
Independent	William Thomas*	Unopposed		

== 1922 Aberdare Urban District Council election ==
Four of the five wards were contested; the exception being the Llwydcoed ward where two Independents were returned unopposed. Labour lost two seats as prominent local figure Edmund Stonelake and the long-serving Illtyd Hopkins lost their seats. Prominent coalowner E.M. Hann did not seek re-election.

=== Aberaman Ward (two seats) ===
Aberaman Ward 1922
Party	Candidate	Votes	%	±%
Independent	Daniel Jones	2,034		
Independent	Major E.I. David	2,013		
Independent	Jonah Lewis	1,455		
Labour	Illtyd Hopkins*	1,397		

=== Blaengwawr Ward (two seats) ===
Blaengwawr Ward 1922
Party	Candidate	Votes	%	±%
Independent	Evan Jones*	1,248		
Labour	David Davies*	1,096		
British Legion	Shapland	1,064		

=== Gadlys Ward ===
Gadlys Ward 1922
Party	Candidate	Votes	%	±%
Independent	E. Ogwen Williams*	1,504		
Independent	D. Morris Powell	1,460		
Labour	Edmund Stonelake*	969		

=== Llwydcoed Ward (two seats) ===
Llwydcoed Ward 1922
Party	Candidate	Votes	%	±%
Independent	W.J. Hodges	Unopposed		
Independent	Mrs A.N. Jenkins*	Unopposed		

=== Town Ward (two seats) ===
Town Ward 1922
Party	Candidate	Votes	%	±%
Independent	Abel P. Thomas	1,563		
Independent	David James	1,449		
Labour	Fred Davies	705		

== 1923 Aberdare Urban District Council election ==
All five wards were contested with Labour losing a total of four seats. Labour's defeats consisted of two seats in Gadlys, and one each in Llwydcoed and Aberaman.

In Llwydcoed, prominent local builder D. Tyssul Davies, a native of Llandysul who had lived in Aberdare for 38 years, and had recently purchased the Llwydcoed estate, ousted Labour councillor John Griffiths. Two sitting members were defeated in Gadlys including serving county councillor Rose Davies. It was stated that a factor in the campaign had been her confinement at Aberdare General Hospital, with the Aberdare Leader commenting that "it is remarkable the indignation showed by so many towards this comparatively trivial incident". Glen George, one of the successful candidates in Gadlys, was the son of the late former councillor Griffith George. The other winning candidate, James Evans, was described as a fluent speaker but rather stiff in English.

=== Aberaman Ward (four seats) ===
Aberaman Ward 1923
Party	Candidate	Votes	%	±%
Independent	Harry Cohen	2,327		
Labour	Evan Jones*	1,848		
Independent	John Davies	1,591		
Independent	Augustus Davies*	1,589		
Labour	Owen Powell*	1,515		
Labour	J.T. Norman	1,407		
Independent	John James	916		
Independent	W.R. Morgan	792		

=== Blaengwawr Ward (two seats) ===
Blaengwawr Ward 1923
Party	Candidate	Votes	%	±%
Labour	D. Ezer Davies	1.044		
Independent	Tom Howells	1,027		
Independent	John Jenkins	987		
Labour	W.J. Rees	876		

=== Gadlys Ward ===
Gadlys Ward 1923
Party	Candidate	Votes	%	±%
Independent	Glen George	1,621		
Independent	James Evans	1,187		
Labour	Ben Brace*	1,108		
Labour	Mrs Rose Davies*	1,094		

=== Llwydcoed Ward (two seats) ===
Llwydcoed Ward 1923
Party	Candidate	Votes	%	±%
Independent	W.M. Llewellyn*	2,499		
Independent	D. Tyssul Davies	1,585		
Labour	John Griffiths*	1,096		

=== Town Ward (two seats) ===
Town Ward 1923
Party	Candidate	Votes	%	±%
Independent	Tom M. Miles	2.002		
Independent	R.L. Berry*	1,606		
Labour	Thomas Williams	817		

== 1924 Aberdare Urban District Council election ==
Five members were to be elected, one in each ward, and three wards were uncontested. The two contested wards saw no change in the political composition of the council.

=== Aberaman Ward ===
Aberaman Ward 1924
Party	Candidate	Votes	%	±%
Labour	John Lewis	unopposed		

=== Blaengwawr Ward ===
Blaengwawr Ward 1924
Party	Candidate	Votes	%	±%
Labour	William Lawrence*	unopposed		

=== Gadlys Ward ===
Gadlys Ward 1924
Party	Candidate	Votes	%	±%
Labour	Idwal Thomas*	1,220		
Independent	Richard Morgan	900		

=== Llwydcoed Ward ===
Llwydcoed Ward 1924
Party	Candidate	Votes	%	±%
Independent	George Jones	1,114		
Labour	W. Smith	741		

=== Town Ward ===
Town Ward 1924
Party	Candidate	Votes	%	±%
Independent	William Thomas*	Unopposed		

== 1925 Aberdare Urban District Council election ==
All five wards were contested, resulting in four Labour gains and the defeat of several long-serving Independent members.

=== Aberaman Ward (two seats) ===
Aberaman Ward 1925
Party	Candidate	Votes	%	±%
Labour	Evan Edwin Jones	2,398		
Labour	William Yeoman	2,165		
Independent	Daniel Jones*	1,961		
Independent	Major E.I. David *	1,733		

=== Blaengwawr Ward (two seats) ===
Blaengwawr Ward 1925
Party	Candidate	Votes	%	±%
Labour	T. Meredith*	1,316		
Labour	John Morgan	1,182		
Independent	Evan Jones*	1,136		
Independent	Cliff Thomas	976		

=== Gadlys Ward ===
Gadlys Ward 1925
Party	Candidate	Votes	%	±%
Labour	Ben J. Brace	1,349		
Independent	D. Morris Powell	1,181		
Independent	E. Ogwen Williams*	979		

=== Llwydcoed Ward (two seats) ===
Llwydcoed Ward 1925
Party	Candidate	Votes	%	±%
Independent	Mrs A.N. Jenkins*	1,492		
Independent	W.J. Hodges	1,471		
Labour	John Davies	708		

=== Town Ward (two seats) ===
Town Ward 1925
Party	Candidate	Votes	%	±%
Independent	David James	1,553		
Independent	Abel P. Thomas	1,542		
Labour	Simon Probert	710		

== 1926 Aberdare Urban District Council election ==
Four of the five wards were contested and, in contrast to three years previously when Labour lost four seats, they gained a further three seats, having made a similar advance in 1925. Labour gained a seat in Aberaman, Blengwawr and Gadlys.

=== Aberaman Ward (four seats) ===
Aberaman Ward 1926
Party	Candidate	Votes	%	±%
Independent	Harry Cohen*	2,271		
Labour	D.H. Jones	2,237		
Labour	D.J. Jones	2,050		
Labour	W.G. Morton	1,997		
Labour	James Lynch	1,984		
Independent	Daniel Jones	1,939		
Independent	Augustus Davies*	1,694		
Independent	James Roberts	1,613		

=== Blaengwawr Ward (two seats) ===
Blaengwawr Ward 1923
Party	Candidate	Votes	%	±%
Labour	D. Ezer Davies*	1.511		
Labour	Martin James	1.216		
Independent	Tom Howells*	1,081		
Independent	Clifford Thomas	866		

=== Gadlys Ward ===
Gadlys Ward 1926
Party	Candidate	Votes	%	±%
Independent	Glen George*	1,195		
Labour	John R. James	1,190		
Independent	James Evans*	1,168		
Labour	Mrs Matt Lewis	1,042		

=== Llwydcoed Ward (two seats) ===
Llwydcoed Ward 1923
Party	Candidate	Votes	%	±%
Independent	D. Tyssul Davies	Unopposed		
Independent	W.M. Llewellyn*	Unopposed		

=== Town Ward (two seats) ===
Town Ward 1926
Party	Candidate	Votes	%	±%
Independent	E.J. Lewis	1,512		
Independent	R.L. Berry*	1,500		
Labour	Edmund Stonelake	1,026		
Labour	S. Probert	812		
