= 1908 Aberdare Urban District Council election =

1908 Welsh local government election

The Aberdare Urban District Council was established in 1894 and covered the parish of Aberdare. Its responsibilities included public health, sanitation, roads and public works generally.

There were five wards, namely Aberaman (also known as No. 5 Ward), Blaengwawr (also known as No. 4 Ward), Gadlys (also known as No. 2 Ward), Llwydcoed (also known as No. 1 Ward), and the Town Ward (also known as No. 3 Ward). Originally, one member was elected from each ward on an annual basis, but from 1904 an additional member was granted to each ward resulting in the election of ten members, out of a total of twenty, every three years. At the intervening election, one member continued to be elected.

An election was held in April 1908. It was preceded by the 1907 election and followed by the 1909 election. The term of office of members elected at the 1905 election came to an end and those elected were to serve until 1911. There were contested elections in two of the five wards.

(*) denotes sitting member

== Results by ward ==
=== Aberaman Ward ===
Aberaman Ward 1908
Party	Candidate	Votes	%	±%
Labour	John Davies*	unopposed		
		Swing		

=== Blaengwawr Ward ===
Blaengwawr Ward 1908
Party	Candidate	Votes	%	±%
Labour	Tom Bowen	926		
	John Howell*	645		

=== Gadlys Ward ===
Gadlys Ward 1908
Party	Candidate	Votes	%	±%
	W.T. Morgan*	836		
	F. Brough	460		
		Swing		

=== Llwydcoed Ward ===
Llwydcoed Ward 1908
Party	Candidate	Votes	%	±%
	M.J. Harries*	unopposed		

=== Town Ward ===
Town Ward 1908
Party	Candidate	Votes	%	±%
	Lewis Noah Williams*	unopposed		
		Swing		

== Bibliography ==
- Jones, Ieuan Gwynedd (1981). Explorations & Explanations. Essays in the Social History of Victorian Wales. Llandysul: Gomer. ISBN 0 85088 644 9.
- Jones, Ieuan Gwynedd (1987). Communities. Essays in the Social History of Victorian Wales. Llandysul: Gomer. ISBN 0 86383 223 7.
