= 1907 Aberdare Urban District Council election =

1907 Welsh local government election

The Aberdare Urban District Council was established in 1894 and covered the parish of Aberdare. Its responsibilities included public health, sanitation, roads and public works generally.

There were five wards, namely Aberaman (also known as No. 5 Ward), Blaengwawr (also known as No. 4 Ward), Gadlys (also known as No. 2 Ward), Llwydcoed (also known as No. 1 Ward), and the Town Ward (also known as No. 3 Ward). Originally, one member was elected from each ward on an annual basis, but from 1904 an additional member was granted to each ward, resulting in the election of ten members, out of a total of twenty, every three years. At the intervening election, one member continued to be elected.

An election was held in March 1907. It was preceded by the 1906 election and followed by the 1908 election. The term of office of members elected at the 1904 election came to an end and those elected were to serve until 1910.

(*) denotes sitting member

== Results by ward ==
=== Aberaman Ward (two seats) ===
Aberaman Ward 1907
Party	Candidate	Votes	%	±%
	Edmund Mills Hann*	unopposed		
Labour	Illtyd Hopkins	unopposed		

=== Blaengwawr Ward (two seats) ===
Blaengwawr Ward 1907
Party	Candidate	Votes	%	±%
Labour	David Davies*	793		
Labour	E. Stonelake*	578		
	T. Jones	477		
	M. Parr	407		

=== Gadlys Ward ===
Gadlys Ward 1907
Party	Candidate	Votes	%	±%
	Thomas Lewis	793		
	D. Tyssul Davies	697		
	John Morgan Jones (Congregationalist minister)	599		

=== Llwydcoed Ward (two seats) ===
Llwydcoed Ward 1907
Party	Candidate	Votes	%	±%
	Rees Llewellyn*	1,034		
	T. Walter Williams*	795		
	D. Jenkins	456		

=== Town Ward (two seats) ===
Town Ward
Party	Candidate	Votes	%	±%
	Edward Morgan*	1,104		
	David Price Davies*	747		
Labour	Williams	459		

== Bibliography ==
- Jones, Ieuan Gwynedd (1981). Explorations & Explanations. Essays in the Social History of Victorian Wales. Llandysul: Gomer. ISBN 0 85088 644 9.
- Jones, Ieuan Gwynedd (1987). Communities. Essays in the Social History of Victorian Wales. Llandysul: Gomer. ISBN 0 86383 223 7.
- Morgan, Kenneth O (1991). Wales in British Politics 1868-1922. Cardiff: University of Wales Press. ISBN 0708311245.
- Parry, Jon (1989). "Labour Leaders and Local Politics 1888-1902: The Example of Aberdare". Welsh History Review. 14 (3): 399–416.
