= National Library of Wales =

Library in Aberystwyth, Wales

The National Library of Wales
- Llyfrgell Genedlaethol Cymru (Welsh)

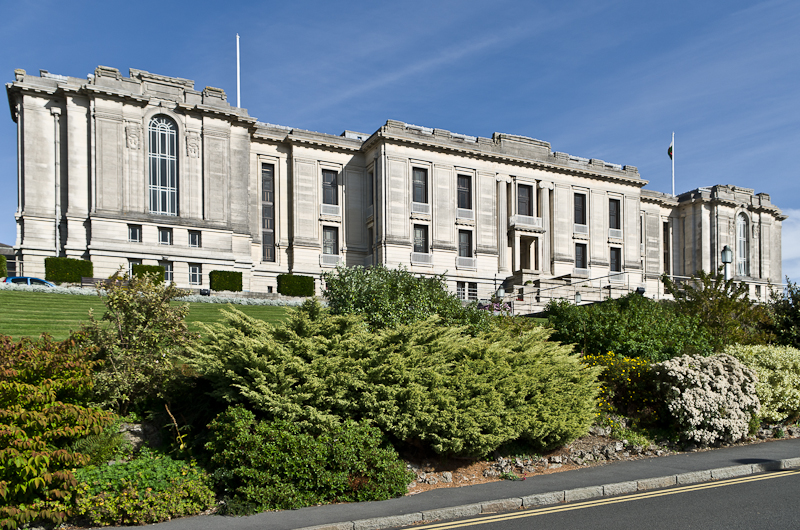
- 52°24′52″N 4°4′8″W
- Location: Penglais Road, Aberystwyth, Ceredigion SY23 3BU
- Type: National Library
- Established: 19 March 1907 (119 years ago)
- Reference to legal mandate: Established by Royal Charter on 19 March 1907. Supplemental Charters were given to the Library in 1911, 1978 and 2006

Collection
- Items collected: Printed Works, Maps, Archives, Manuscripts, Audio Visual Material, Photographs, Paintings
- Size: 6M Books, 1.5M Maps, 950,000 Photographs, 60,000 Works of Art
- Criteria for collection: Acquisition through purchase, bequest and legal deposit
- Legal deposit: Yes

Access and use
- Access requirements: Library open to all. Access to reading rooms restricted to over 16s without prior permission.

Other information
- Budget: £9.89 million (2020–21)
- Director: Rhodri Llwyd Morgan
- Employees: around 230 FTE
- Website: www.library.wales

The National Library of Wales (Welsh: Llyfrgell Genedlaethol Cymru, pronounced [ˈɬəvrɡɛɬ ɡɛnɛdˈleɨθɔl ˈkəmrɨ]) is the national legal deposit library of Wales and a Welsh Government sponsored body, located in Aberystwyth. It is the biggest library in Wales, holding over 6.5 million books and periodicals, and the largest collections of archives, portraits, maps, and photographic images in Wales. The Library is also home to the national collection of Welsh manuscripts, the National Screen and Sound Archive of Wales, and the most comprehensive collection of paintings and topographical prints in Wales. As the primary research library and archive in Wales and one of the largest research libraries in the United Kingdom, the National Library is a member of Research Libraries UK (RLUK) and the Consortium of European Research Libraries (CERL).

At the very core of the National Library of Wales is the mission to collect and preserve materials related to Wales and Welsh life and those which can be utilised by the people of Wales for study and research. Welsh is the Library's main medium of communication, but it does aim to deliver all public services in Welsh and English.

== History ==
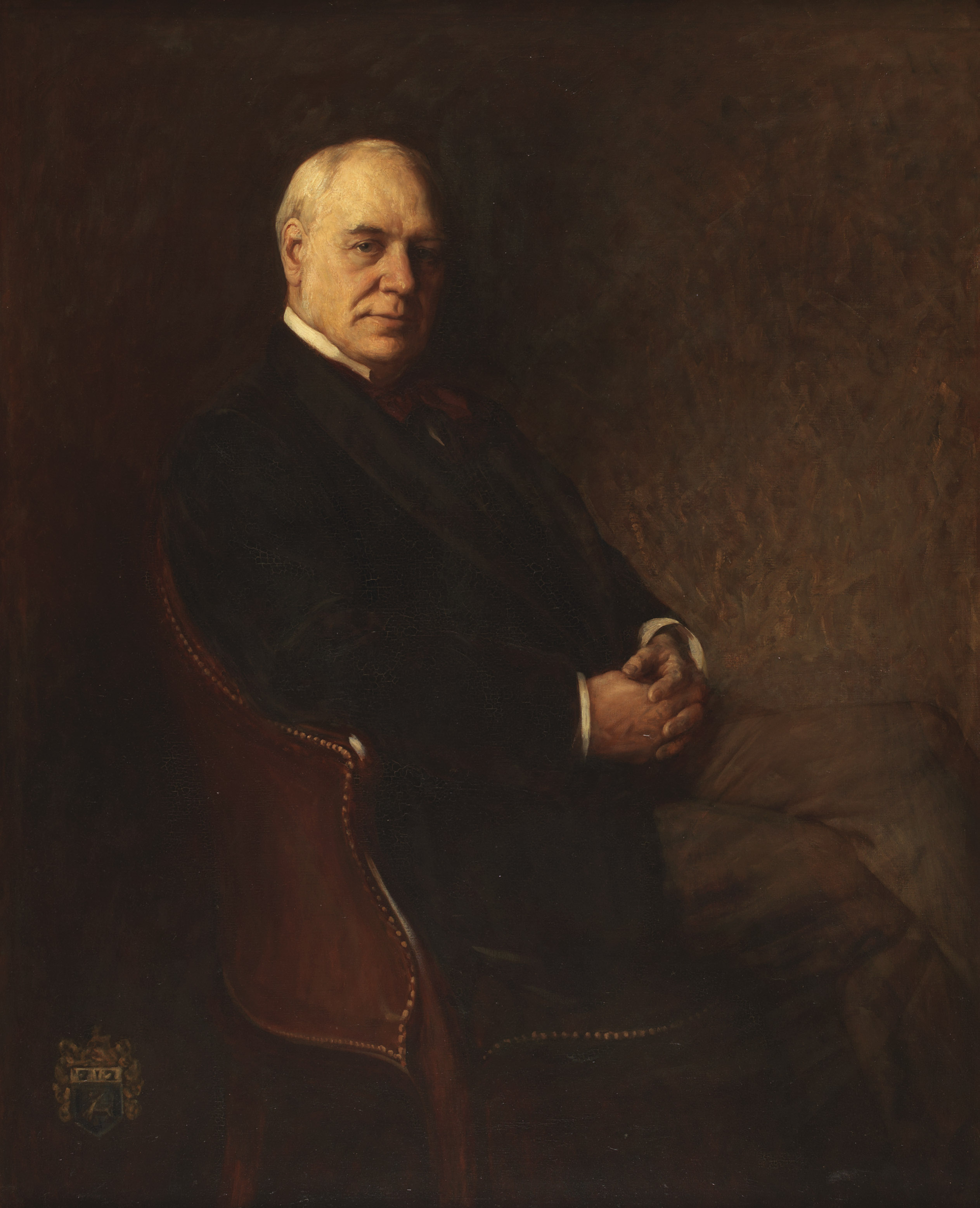
Sir John Williams, one of the principal founders of the National Library

In 1873, a committee was set up to collect Welsh material and house it at University College, Aberystwyth. In 1905, the government promised money in its budget to establish a National Library and a National Museum of Wales, and the Privy Council appointed a committee to decide on the location of the two institutions. David Lloyd George, who later became Prime Minister, supported the effort to establish the National Library in Aberystwyth, which was selected as the location of the library after a bitter fight with Cardiff, partly because a collection was already available in the College. Sir John Williams, physician and book collector, had also said he would present his collection (in particular, the Peniarth collection of manuscripts) to the library if it were established in Aberystwyth. He also eventually gave £20,000 to build and establish the library.

Cardiff was eventually selected as the location of the National Museum of Wales. Funds for both the National Library and the National Museum were contributed by the subscriptions of the working classes, which was unusual in the establishment of such institutions. In a Prefatory Note to A List of Subscribers to the Building Fund (1924), the first librarian, John Ballinger, estimates that there were almost 110,000 contributors. The Library and Museum were established by Royal Charter on 19 March 1907. The Charter stipulated that if the National Library of Wales should be removed from Aberystwyth then the manuscripts donated by Sir John Williams will become the property of the University College. A new Royal Charter was granted in 2006.

The National Library of Wales was granted the privilege of legal deposit under the Copyright Act 1911. Initially, however, the Library could only claim material deemed to be of Welsh and Celtic interest without any restrictions on expensive or limited edition publications. In 1987, the last of these restrictions were removed to make the legal deposit entitlement of the National Library of Wales equal to those of the Bodleian Library, Cambridge University Library, Trinity College Library, Dublin and the National Library of Scotland.

The first use of the Library of Congress Classification by a library in Britain was at the National Library of Wales in 1913.

=== Buildings ===
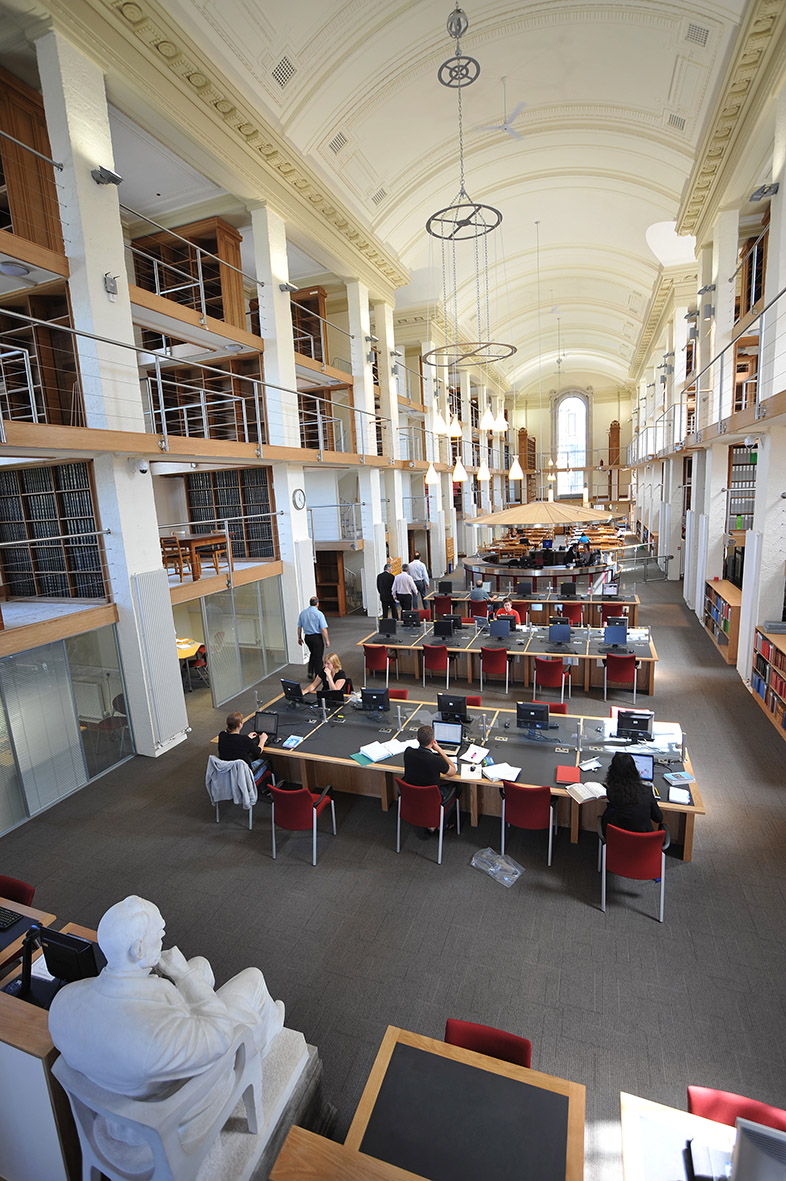
The North Reading Room

On 15 July 1911, King George V and Queen Mary laid the foundation stone of the National Library of Wales. Designed by architect Sidney Greenslade, who won the competition to design the building in 1909, the building at Grogythan, off Penglais Hill, was ready for occupation in August 1915 but the task of transferring the collections was not completed until 1 March 1916, St David's Day. The central block, or corps de logis, was added by Charles Holden to a modified version of Greenslade's design. It was completed in 1937 and is a Grade II* listed building. The grounds (landscaping) of the National Library of Wales are also Grade II listed, and are seen as a significant part of the historical landscape of Wales with the landscaping both supporting, and playing a key part of the overall architectural design of the library building.

The Library is faced with Portland stone on the upper storeys which contrasts with the Cornish granite below it. Restoration work was necessary in 1969 and 1983 due to the effects of weathering on the Portland stone. In recent years many changes have been made to the front part of the building.

The large North Reading Room, where printed books are consulted, has "the proportions of a Gothic Cathedral", being 175 feet long, 47 feet wide and 33 feet high. There are galleries at three levels above the floor. The feasibility of installing a mezzanine floor to make better use of the space has been considered on two occasions. Until 2022, The South Reading Room was used for consulting archives, manuscripts, maps and other printed materials. It now houses the Wales Broadcast Archive Centre, an Archive of programmes from all the major Welsh broadcasters dating back to the beginnings of broadcasting in Wales in the 1920s; this includes BBC Wales, ITV Wales and S4C. Carved above the entrance is the room's original name the Print and Maps Room. Above it on the second floor of the south wing is the Gregynog Gallery where temporary and permanent exhibitions display the treasures of the Library's collections.

A six-storey bookstack, which was completed in 1931, was built to increase storage space for the rapidly expanding book collection. A second bookstack was officially opened in March 1982. In 1996, the Third Library Building was opened, doubling the storage capacity of the Library. The second phase of the building was built by T. Alun Evans (Aberystwyth) Ltd.

A fire on 26 April 2013 destroyed a section of roofing in an office area of the building. Restoration was assisted by a government grant of £625,000.

=== Wartime sanctuary ===
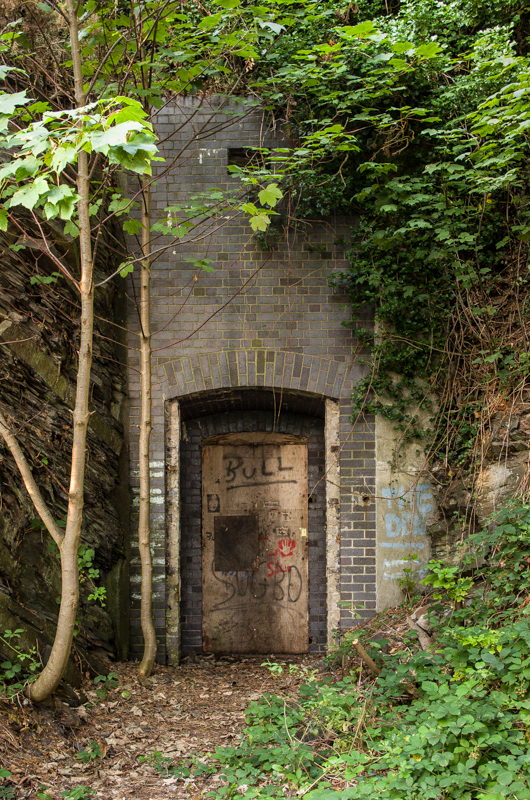
Entrance to the tunnel that was constructed under the National Library of Wales for the storage of valuable material during the Second World War

During the Second World War, many of Britain's most valuable artworks and manuscripts were stored in the National Library of Wales, which provided the evacuated treasures with a refuge from enemy bombing raids. The architect Charles Holden was instructed to design a tunnel for this purpose in the outcrop of rock close to the main building, with the British Museum sharing in the costs that this incurred. The tunnel was heated and ventilated to ensure the preservation of vellum, papyri and paper during its use from 18 July 1940 until 23 May 1945. In addition to an extensive consignment from the British Museum, which weighed over one hundred tons, the Library received forty-six boxes of manuscript and printed books from Corpus Christi College, Cambridge and over a thousand pictures, eighty-two boxes of books and twenty members of staff from the National Gallery. The Library also received irreplaceable items from other prestigious institutions such as the Ashmolean Museum, Oxford, Dulwich College and the Royal Society.

A number of distinguished scholars from the British Museum accompanied the collections to Aberystwyth. Their senior member of staff was Deputy Keeper of Printed Books, Victor Scholderer, who responded to a letter from the Director, Sir John Forsdyke, by insisting that he and his colleagues would continue to sleep in the Library so that the tunnel could be checked during the night to ensure that the air conditioning was functioning properly. Scholderer, an expert on incunabula, produced A Handlist of Incunabula in the National Library of Wales in gratitude to the hospitality that was afforded to them by the Library. Likewise, Arthur E. Popham, Keeper of Prints and Drawings, dedicated The Drawings of Leonardo da Vinci "To the Librarian and staff of the National Library of Wales". Several other institutions donated funds to the Library as an expression of their gratitude and Mrs. David Sassoon, London presented two works by Cicero that were printed at Venice in the fifteenth century.

The documents and artefacts that spent World War II in the care of the National Library include an original exemplification of Magna Carta, drawings by Leonardo da Vinci, paintings by Rembrandt, Rubens and Velásquez from Dulwich College, letters of the kings and queens of England, and autographs belonging to William Shakespeare.

=== National Librarians ===
The librarian of the National Library of Wales holds the title of National Librarian of Wales, and also serves as the National Library's chief executive. The National Librarians since 1909 have been:

- John Ballinger (1909–1930)
- William Llewelyn Davies (1930–1952)
- Thomas Parry (1953–1958)
- E. D. Jones (1958–1969)
- David Jenkins (1969–1979)
- R. Geraint Gruffydd (1980–1985)
- Brynley F. Roberts (1985–1994)
- J. Lionel Madden (1994–1998)
- Andrew M. Green (1998–2013)
- Aled Gruffydd Jones (2013–2015)
- Linda Tomos (2015–2019)
- Pedr ap Llwyd (2019–2024)
- Rhodri Llwyd Morgan (2024–)

== Library collections ==
The collections of the National Library of Wales include over 6.5 million printed volumes, including the first book printed in Welsh, Yny lhyvyr hwnn (1546). In addition to the printed book collections, there are about 25,000 manuscripts in the holdings. The archival collections at the Library include the Welsh Political Archive and National Screen and Sound Archive of Wales. The Library also keeps maps, photographs, paintings, topographical and landscape prints, periodicals and newspapers. In 2010, the Peniarth Manuscript collection and The Life Story of David Lloyd George were amongst the first ten inscriptions on the UK Memory of the World Register, a UNESCO record of documentary heritage of cultural significance.

Collection development is focused on materials relating to the people of Wales, those in the Welsh language and resources for Celtic studies, but other materials are collected for the purposes of education and literary and scientific research. As a legal deposit library, the National Library is entitled to request a copy of every work published in the United Kingdom and Ireland. This has allowed the Library to collect modern Welsh, Irish and Gaelic language books for its Celtic collection. The acquisition of material through legal deposit has been supplemented by purchases, international exchanges, donations and bequests.

The Celtic collection includes works in all six Celtic languages. A representative collection of Scottish Gaelic books has been assembled, primarily through purchase of earlier publications, guided by the standard bibliographies, and, for books published after 1911, by legal deposit. Irish literature, which is far more extensive, has been collected through a similar combination of purchase and deposit. However, many collections purchased by or donated to the Library have contained rare Irish books. The Library of Dr E. C. Quiggin, which was received in 1921, contained a large Irish collection and many early Breton books. Further Breton books have been purchased or were acquired in the libraries of Sir Edward Anwyl, Thomas Powel, Dr Thomas Gwynn Jones, Dr Paul Diverres and Llywarch Reynolds. The holdings of Cornish and Manx printed books include practically everything that has been published in those languages, with a few facsimiles.

The Library's holdings can also be found in the European Library and Copac union catalogues.

=== Manuscripts ===
The National Library of Wales keeps many rare and important manuscripts, including the Black Book of Carmarthen (the earliest surviving manuscript entirely in Welsh), the Book of Taliesin, the Hendregadredd Manuscript, and an early manuscript of Geoffrey Chaucer. Around three hundred medieval manuscripts are deposited in the Library: about 100 are in Welsh. The manuscript collection amalgamated a number of entire collections that were acquired in the early years of the Library's existence, including the Hengwrt-Peniarth, Mostyn, Llanstephan, Panton, Cwrtmawr, Wrexham and Aberdare manuscripts. The Welsh manuscripts in these foundation collections were catalogued by Dr J. Gwenogvryn Evans in the Reports on manuscripts in the Welsh language that he compiled for the Historic Manuscripts Commission.

==== Peniarth Manuscripts ====
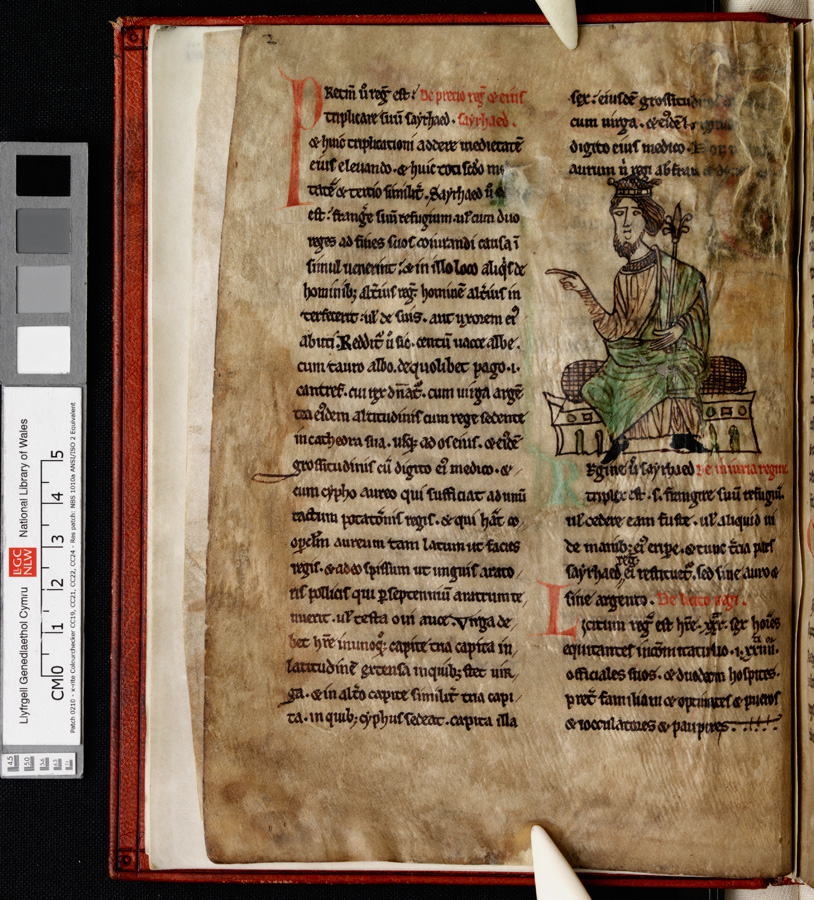
Laws of Hywel Dda (fol. 1v), King Hywel

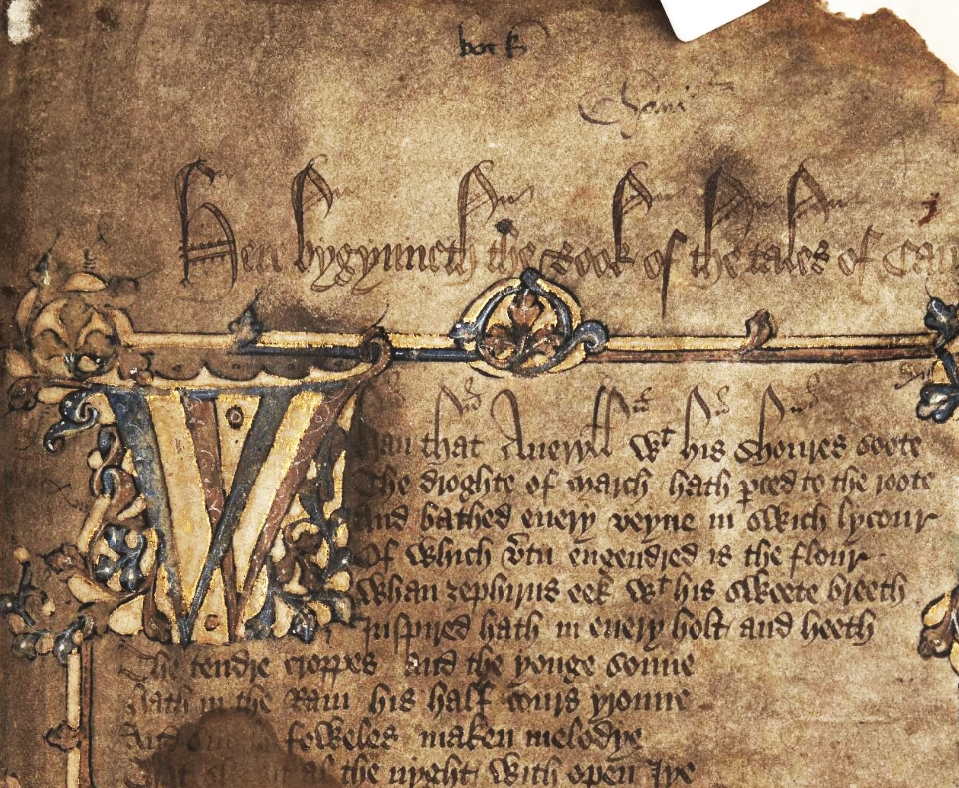
Hengwrt Chaucer

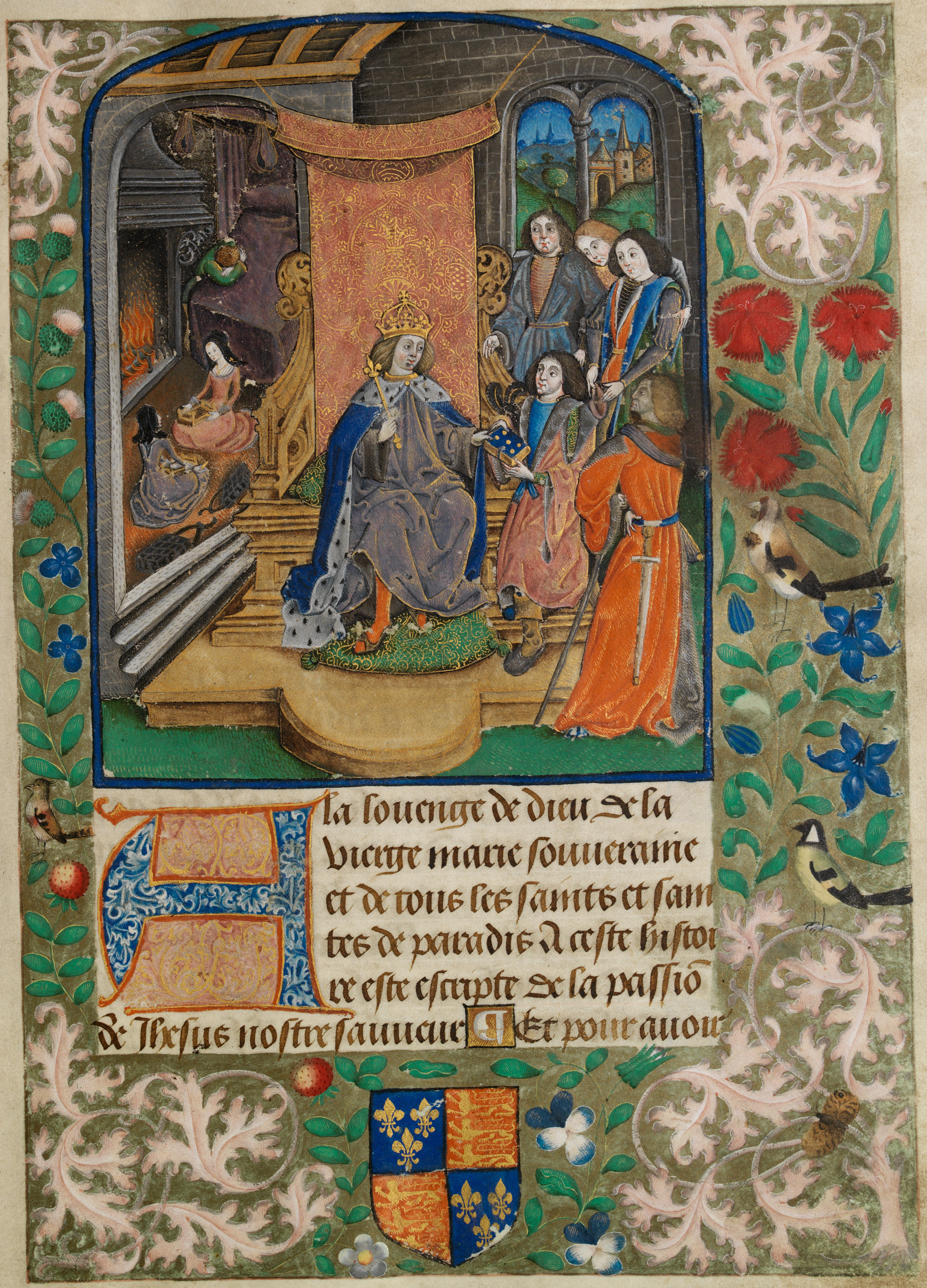
Vaux Passional (fol. 9r). In the first miniature the sovereign (King Henry VII) is presented with this book while the infant Henry VIII (upper left) mourns the death of his mother.

The Peniarth Manuscripts collection is considered to be of global significance and the most important collection of manuscripts in the National Library of Wales. In 2010, it was included in the UK Memory of the World Register of documentary heritage. Of the 561 volumes of manuscripts in the Peniarth collection, some four-fifths were collected by Robert Vaughan (c. 1592–1667) for his library in Hengwrt, Meirioneth. Three of the Four Ancient Books of Wales are part of the Peniarth collection, and this is indicative of the overall quality of the manuscripts and their importance as part of Welsh heritage. There are, however, also manuscripts in Cornish, Latin and English that are themselves noteworthy. The collection includes:

- The Black Book of Carmarthen (c. 1250), the earliest manuscript in Welsh (Peniarth MS 1).
- The Book of Taliesin (c. 1350–1400) contains the oldest Welsh verse by the sixth-century poet Taliesin (Peniarth MS 2).
- The White Book of Rhydderch (c. 1350), a composite volume that contains the earliest version of the Mabinogion (Peniarth MS 4).
- The earliest fragments of Branwen and Manawydan and two fragments of Geraint ap Erbin comprise the four parts of Peniarth MS 6.
- Ystoryaeu Seint Greal (Tales of the Holy Grail), transcribed by Hywel Fychan around the year 1300, is the finest in a series of Romance manuscripts. A letter addressed to Lady Charlotte Guest concerning access to this text to have it copied is loose inside the volume (Peniarth MS 11).
- The Chronicle of the Princes in Peniarth MS 20 (c. 1330) is one of the two main versions of Brut y Tywysogion, the other being the Red Book of Hergest, which is in the Bodleian Library, Oxford.
- History of the Kings (Peniarth MS 23C), is a copy of Brut y Brenhinedd, the Welsh translation of the Historia Regum Britanniae by Geoffrey of Monmouth. It is a rare instance of an illustrated medieval Welsh manuscript.
- The Laws of Hywel Dda (c. 1300–1350), the earliest extant text (in Latin) of native Welsh law (Peniarth MS 28). More than 50% of the manuscripts known to contain the laws of Hywel Dda are in the collections of the National Library, with the majority being in the Peniarth Collection (see the list of Welsh Law manuscripts).
- Llyfr Du'r Waun (mid-13th century), also known as the Black Book of Chirk, the earliest Welsh text of the laws of Hywel Dda (Peniarth MS 29).
- Peniarth 32 is a 15th-century volume of the laws of Hywel Dda.
- The Peniarth 51 manuscript contains poetry, Welsh grammar, vocabularies, and historical triads that was written, mostly in the hand of Gwilym Tew, during the second half of the 15th century.
- Barddoniaeth Hywel Dafi (c. 1483–1500), a volume of poetry most by and possibly in the hand of Howel Davi. Other poets included in this volume are Bedo Brwynllys, Dafydd Llwyd, Llywelyn ap Morgan, Dafydd ap Gwilym and Ieuan ap Howel. The assumption that this manuscript was written by Howel Davi is challenged by evidence, such as slips of the pen that occur in poems of Davi's composition, that suggest the scribe was copying these poems. With the exception of two sections (42 and 43), which are an attempt at transcription by an unskilled hand, the entire manuscript appears to be the work of one scribe (Peniarth MS 67).
- Beunans Meriasek (The Life of St Meriasek) (1504), the earliest surviving manuscript in the Cornish language (Peniarth MS 105B). It is believed to have been completed in 1504 by Radolphus Ton, who was a canon during the final efflorescence of Cornish literature at Glasney College, Penryn. This play, which is set in Camborne, is a celebration of the life and work of St Meriasek that depicts the cultural links between Cornwall and Brittany. Beunans Meriasek was rediscovered by W. W. E. Wynne in the 1860s among the volumes from the Hengwrt Library that had been bequeathed to him in 1859. It is the most important extant Cornish manuscript.
- Cywyddau and other poems, written in the hand of Lewys Glyn Cothi, comprise the manuscript Peniarth 109.
- Esboniadau ar Gyfraith Hywel Dda (Peniarth MS 164), is a volume of commentaries on the Laws of Hywel Dda from the early 15th century.
- Peniarth Manuscript 259B is a version of the Laws of Hywel Dda from the mid-16th century.
- The Hengwrt Chaucer (c. 1400–1410), a folio volume of The Canterbury Tales, sometimes attributed to the scribe Adam Pinkhurst. One of the treasures of the National Library of Wales and by far the most important of the Peniarth Manuscripts in English (Peniarth MS 392D).
- The 15th-century volume comprising Disticha Catonis, the Battles of Alexander the Great, and History of the Three Kings (Peniarth 481D), and the late 15th-century Vaux Passional (Peniarth 482), which was prepared for Henry VII, were acquired and deposited in the National Library by Gwendoline and Margaret Davies in 1921. These two fine illuminated manuscripts were retained by W. R. M. Wynne when he sold the Peniarth Manuscripts to Sir John Williams.
- A bound volume containing books by Giovanni Battista Palatino and Ugo da Carpi, both notable Italian masters of the 16th century, which is assumed to have been owned by John Jones of Gellilyfdy (Peniarth MS 522).
- Bede's De natura rerum (12th century), a copy of the scientific treatise in Latin that is believed to have been written in Wales. Contains decorative initials, including three that have a zoomorphic design similar to those found in Irish manuscripts from this time (Peniarth MS 540B).
- Over forty manuscripts in the hand of John Jones of Gellilyfdy, embellished with initial capital letters and head- and tailpieces that demonstrate his calligraphic talent.

==== Llanstephan Manuscripts ====
The Llanstephan Collection of manuscripts was donated to the National Library of Wales by Sir John Williams in 1909. It had been his personal collection, which he kept in the library of his home, Llanstephan mansion, Carmarthenshire. The collection is composed of the 154 manuscripts which had belonged to Moses Williams (1685–1742), that were purchased from Shirburn Castle, Oxfordshire and other manuscripts of diverse origins collected by Sir John. Medieval Welsh prose is well represented in the Shirburn Castle collection, with chronicles, legends, fables, theological tracts and collections of works by eminent poets of the period. These manuscripts include a Welsh translation of Geoffrey of Monmouth's Historia from the 13th century, the Gutun Owain Manuscript and the Red Book of Talgarth.

==== Cwrtmawr Manuscripts ====
The Cwrtmawr Manuscripts are one of the significant manuscript collections that were transferred to the National Library of Wales in the early years of its existence. They are from the personal collection of John Humphreys Davies, who was the Principal of University College, Aberystwyth. Davies was a barrister and a keen book collector who acquired the manuscripts gradually from a number of sources. The largest group of manuscripts are those acquired from John Jones ('Myrddin Fardd'), but there are several other substantial groups including those from a Welsh clerical family, the Richards of Darowen, Peter Bailey Williams and his brother Rev. St George Armstrong Williams, William John Roberts ('Gwilym Cowlyd'), and Daniel Silvan Evans.

==== General Manuscript Collection ====
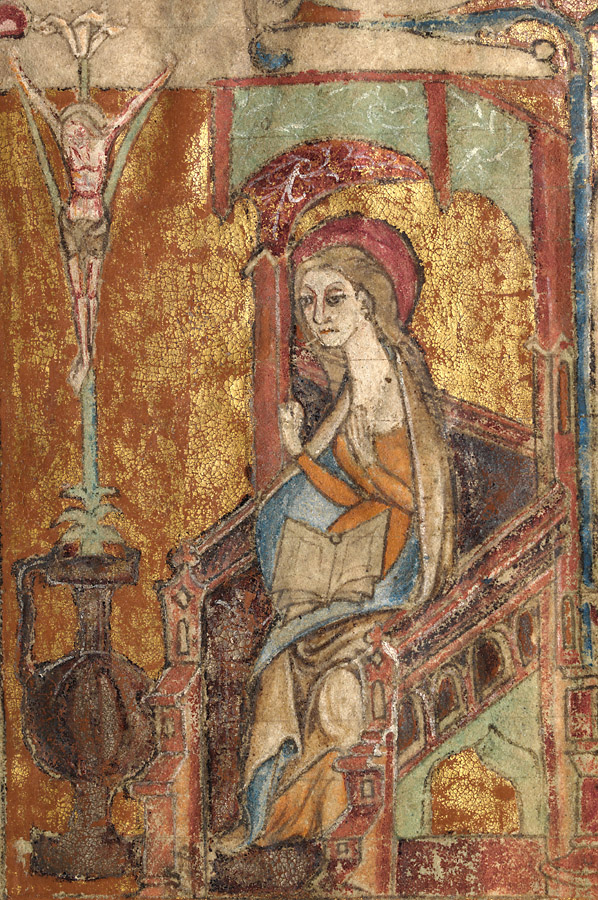
Llanbeblig Hours (fol. 2r): the "Lily Crucifixion" Annunciation scene with the Virgin Mary enthroned under a green canopy

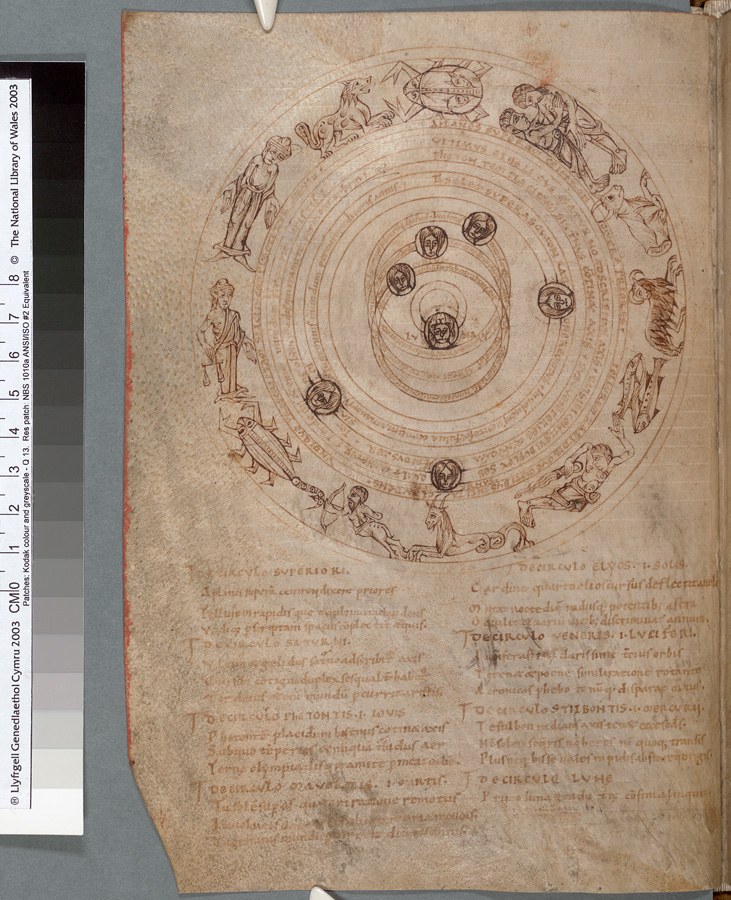
Medieval Astronomy (fol. 4v)

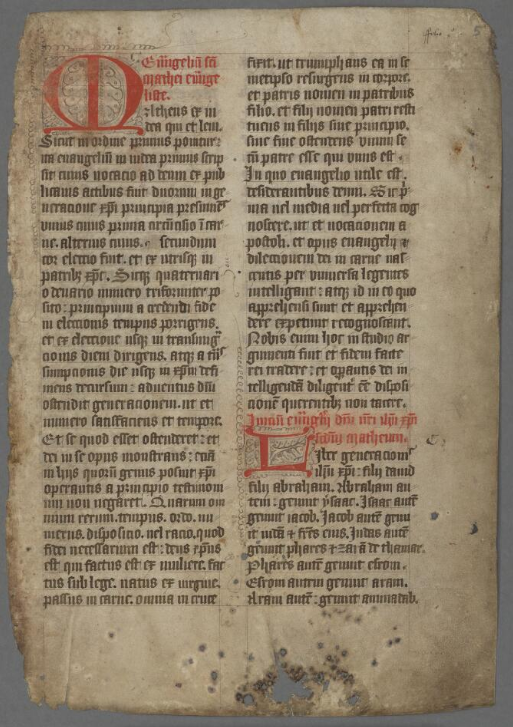
NLW MS 17110E Liber Lanavensis fol. 5r

In addition to the Peniarth and Llanstephan manuscripts, the collection that Sir John Williams donated to the National Library included 500 manuscripts in the general collection (NLW MS 1–500). These manuscripts are an amalgamation of the various purchases that Sir John made between 1894 and 1899, including groups of manuscripts from the Welsh philologist Egerton Phillimore, Sir Thomas Phillipps of Middle Hill, the Ashburn library and Sir Edmund Buckley of Plas Dinas Mawddwy. Descriptions of 446 of these manuscripts are provided by J. H. Davies in Additional Manuscripts in the Collections of Sir John Williams, which the Library published in 1921. The manuscripts in the National Library which are not part of the foundation collections are the focus of the Handlist of manuscripts, which was first published in 1941. All manuscripts acquired by donation or purchase are added to this open-ended series, either singly or in groups, if they are: a) in a format compatible with the collection, i.e. manuscript books or rolls, or unbound material that can be filed; and b) not integral to an archive or individual collection. There is, however, much archival material, most notably correspondence, held in the General Manuscript Collection. Individual manuscripts of particular interest include:

- A volume of medieval astronomy texts is the oldest scientific manuscript in the National Library (NLW MS 735C). The first section of the volume was written around 1000 and the second dates from c. 1150. Both sections were copied in the Limousin region of France. The Latin text describes the constellations with the aid of diagrams and colour illustrations of Zodiac images.
- The Black Book of Basingwerk (NLW MS 7006D) is a 15th-century manuscript containing a version of Brut y Brenhinedd, a Welsh translation of Geoffrey of Monmouth's Historia Regum Britanniae. Particular features of interest include the medieval wooden board binding and the decorated initials embellished with gold.
- The Llywarch Reynolds Manuscripts (NLW MS 970 to 997) are the 28 volumes that Llywarch Owain Reynolds bequeathed to the Library in 1916. The most notable among them is the 17th century collection of Welsh poetry, Llyuyr Hir Llywarch Reynolds.
- The Book of Llandaff (NLW MS 17110E), also known as Liber Landavensis, is an ecclesiastical manuscript written between 1120 and 1140.
- The Llanbeblig Book of Hours (NLW MS 17520A) is a small manuscript book compiled around 1390. The manuscript has a number of entries in the calendar that connect it to Wales, including a celebration of the dedication of the church of Saint Peblig, Caernarfon. Isabella Godynogh (d. 1413) was possibly its original owner. The full-page miniatures, illuminated with gold, and the fine lettering indicate the value of the book. The Llanbeblig Hours is the only known illuminated manuscript that contains the iconographical Lily Crucifixion motif, and may be the earliest example of its use in any media.
- NLW MS 20143A is a manuscript of the laws of Hywel Dda written in Welsh around 1350. It is unusual in that it retains a medieval binding.
- The Tintern Abbey Bible (NLW MS 22631C) is a 13th-century Bible that has a known association with the medieval library of the Cistercian monastery at Tintern, Monmouthshire. It was purchased by the National Library for £30,000 in a Christie's sale in December 1988 and is the second book known to have survived from the Tintern library. Under ultraviolet light the erased 15th-century inscription Ista biblia olim Abbathie de Tinternie (This Bible used to [belong to] Tintern Abbey) is visible to confirm the provenance of the manuscript.
- Beunans Ke (NLW MS 23849D) is a 16th-century Cornish manuscript discovered among the papers of Professor J. E. Caerwyn Williams after they were deposited in the National Library in 2000.

Groups of manuscripts in the general collection include:

- Panton (NLW MSS 1970–2068)
- Mostyn (NLW MSS 3021-76 and 21238-54)
- Bourdillon (NLW MSS 5001–5148)
- Llanover (NLW MSS 13061-184)
- Gwysaney (NLW MSS 17110-62).

=== Rare books ===
There are many rare books in the National Library of Wales including the three earliest books printed in Welsh, Yny lhyvyr hwnn (1546), Oll synnwyr pen Kembero ygyd (1547) and A Dictionary in Englyshe and Welshe (1547) by William Salesbury. The Library also holds the first Welsh translation of the complete Bible (1588). The National Library's rare books include collections of incunabula, sixteenth-century European imprints, private press publications, bindings and scientific works.

Thanks to the collections of printed books that were donated by Sir John Williams, J. H. Davies and Edward Humphrey Owen, the Library has particularly strong holdings of publications in the Welsh language from before 1912. Of the 286 Welsh books published between 1546 and 1710, the National Library possesses copies of 210, and has facsimiles of others that exist as a unique copy in another institution.

Many of the named collections of printed books include early or otherwise rare books:

- Anderson Collection (purchased 1981): twenty-four Short-title catalogue (STC) (1475–1640) and twenty-two Wing (1641–1700) books; five editions from the Nonesuch Press.
- Bangor Baptist College Collection: some thirty STC, ninety-five Wing and 185 eighteenth century items.
- Castell Gorfod Collection (deposited in 1920): includes twenty STC and ninety Wing books.
- Chirk Castle Collection: around seventy-five Wing items and many 18th century imprints.
- Early Law Collection: Approximately 120 works which include twenty STC, forty Wing and sixty ESTC items.
- Llandaff Cathedral Library (deposited 1943, purchased 1984): one incunabulum, twenty-two STC and 234 Wing items.
- St Asaph Cathedral Library (deposited 1970): around 2,500 volumes which include approximately 200 STC and 900 Wing items.
- Trefeca Collection (includes the collection of Howel Harris): 1,500 volumes with fifty STC and 350 Wing items.
- United Theological College, Aberystwyth (deposited 1982): ten STC and forty Wing items.
- Rowland Williams collection (deposited 1966): six STC, twelve Wing, and 191 ESTC books.

==== Sir John Williams Collection ====
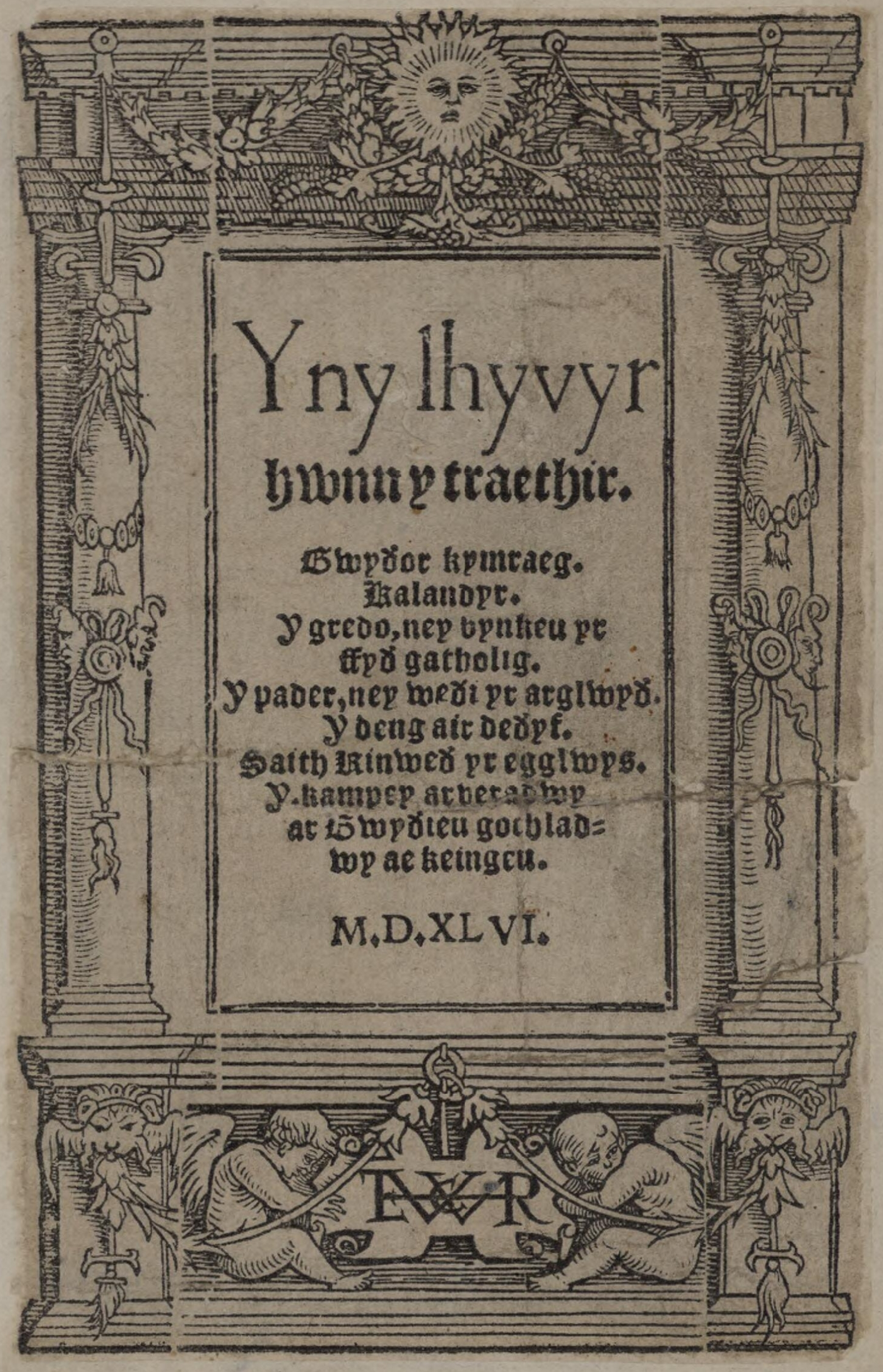
Yny lhyvyr hwnn, 1546: attributed to Sir John Prise

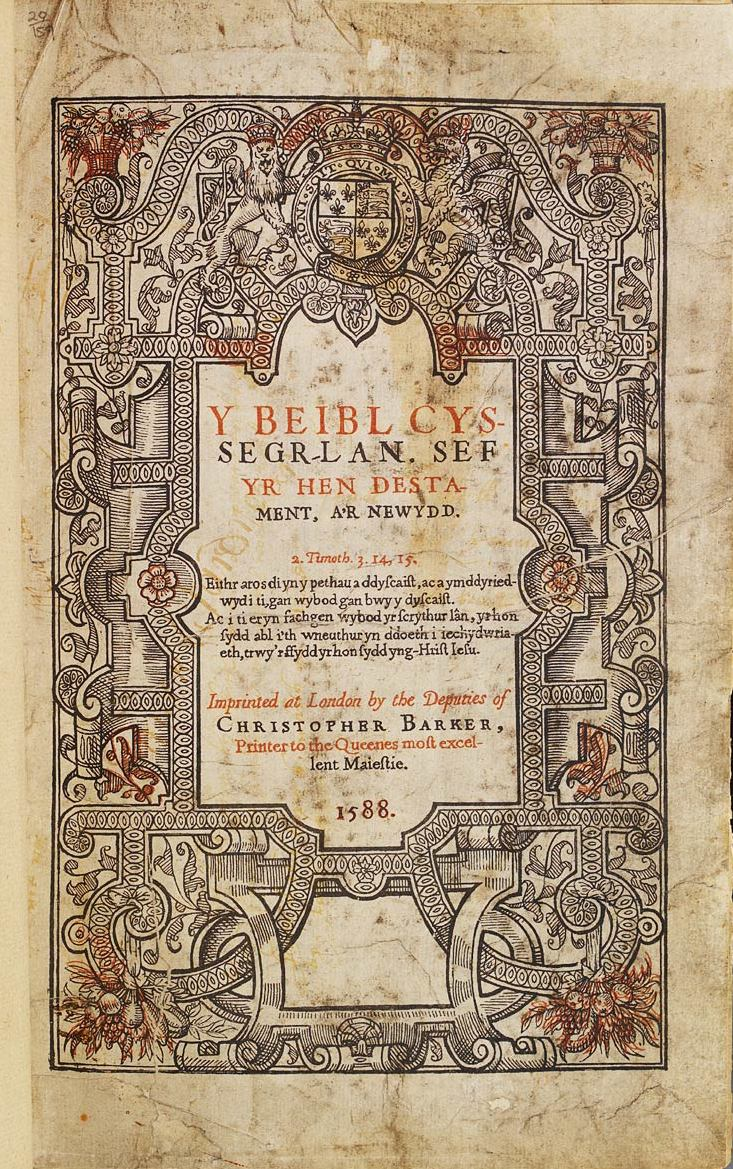
First Welsh Bible, 1588

The Sir John Williams Collection forms the nucleus of the Library's printed books collection. The collection of approximately 23,360 volumes contains many items of importance to the history of Welsh printing, which were donated to the Library when it was established in 1907. Nineteen of the first twenty-two books published in Welsh are present, of which fourteen were acquired from the Shirburn Castle library with the Llanstephan Manuscripts. The collection from Shirburn Castle comprises 193 printed books and pamphlets that were all printed before 1750; a superb miscellany of books from the first century of Welsh printing. Some of the particularly significant items that belonged to Sir John are:

- Yny lhyvyr hwnn ... [In this book ...] (1546) by Sir John Prise, the only known copy of the first book printed in Welsh.
- Oll synnwyr pen Kembero ygyd by Gruffudd Hiraethog (1547).
- William Salesbury's A Dictionary in Englyshe and Welshe (1547).
- A translation of the New Testament by Salesbury (1567). The difficulty of reading Salesbury's pedantic translation prompted William Morgan, vicar of Llanrhaeadr-ym-Mochnant, to begin his translation of the Bible in 1578.
- Y Drych Cristianogawl [The Christian Mirror] (1586–7), probably the earliest book printed in Wales.
- The first Welsh translation of the complete Bible by William Morgan (1588). Morgan's Bible not only strengthened the hold of the Protestant faith in Wales, it also created a new and accessible prose.
- John Penry's pamphlet of 1588, An exhortation unto the governours.
- The Welsh translation of the first part of Canisius's Opus catechisticum by Rosier Smyth, published in Paris, 1609.
- Cân o senn iw hên Feistr Tobacco [A Diatribe against Tobacco] (1718), the only extant copy.
- Early editions of Morgan Llwyd, Robert Recorde, Henry and Thomas Vaughan, and the epigrammist John Owen.
- A comprehensive collection of publications from the Kelmscott Press.
- A 1488 edition of Lancelot du lac, part of a large Arthurian collection.
- A Fourth Folio of Shakespeare (1685).

==== Ty Coch Collection ====
Purchased in 1910, the library of Edward Humphrey Owen (1850–1904), from Ty Coch, Caernarfon, is the third of the National Library of Wales' foundation collections. The 3,680 volumes are mainly of Welsh interest, with the 1567 New Testament and 1588 Bible to be found among some twenty books from the sixteenth century. Other items of interest are a first edition of Milton's Paradise lost (1668), numerous first editions of John Ruskin and George Borrow, and books from the Baskerville and Strawberry Hill presses.

==== John Humphreys Davies Bequest ====
When John Humphreys Davies died on 10 August 1926 he bequeathed his collection of over 10,000 printed volumes to the National Library of Wales. Davies was a keen bibliographer who acquired multiple copies of some works for variants in the typography and accumulated an important collection of Welsh literature, discovering some previously unrecorded works in the process. Some of the early Welsh books that Davies collected contain leaves or signatures that were not in the copies that the National Library already possessed. The rare books include:

- Annerch ir Cymru (1721) by Ellis Pugh was the first Welsh book to be printed in America.
- A complete first edition of part one of Aleluja, neu, Casgliad o hymnau, ar amryw ystyriaethau (1744) by William Williams of Pantycelyn.
- Testament Newydd (1567).
- Y Bibl (1630).
- Ystyriaethau Drexelivs ar dragywyddoldeb (1661), Ellis Lewis' Welsh translation, from the English translation by Winterton, of Jeremias Drexel's De aeternitate considerationes.
- A previously unrecorded large paper issue of Y Bibl (1690).
- A copy of the 1688 edition of Taith neu siwrnai y pererin [Pilgrim's Progress] is one of the seventy-three works by John Bunyan.
- Eighty-three volumes of the works of William Williams of Pantycelyn.

There are also substantial collections of pamphlets, elegies, almanacs, ballads, satires and tracts that Davies had collected.

==== Bourdillon Collection ====
In 1922 the National Library of Wales purchased the collection of French medieval literary texts and early illustrated books that had been assembled by Francis William Bourdillon (1852–1921). Bourdillon's library included twenty-three editions of the Roman de la Rose and an important group of works on the Arthurian legend. The 6,178 printed volumes include sixty-six incunabula, 180 English short title catalogue books (1475–1800), including twenty-five STC and fifty Wing books. Further, there are 320 volumes that were printed in continental Europe during the sixteenth century, and another 260 items which date from the 17th and 18th centuries.

==== Incunabula ====
The National Library has a collection of about 250 incunabula, which are predominantly German, Italian and French imprints. Sixty-six of the incunabula, including seven different editions of the Roman de la Rose, with the accepted first edition among them, are part of Francis William Bourdillon's collection that was purchased by the Library in 1922. At least three of the incunabula acquired from Bourdillon's library are not known in any other copy: a Quatre fils Aymon, a Destruction de Jerusalem, and a Vie de Ste. Catherine. Sir Charles Thomas-Stanford presented or bequeathed eighteen incunabula in total, half of which were printed in Germany.

Three examples of early English printing were donated to the Library by Gwendoline and Margaret Davies of Gregynog in 1921. Two of these books were printed by William Caxton: Speculum Vitae Christi of 1488, and the copy of Ranulf Higden's Polychronicon (1482) that had previously been the property of Higden's Monastery, St. Werburgh's Abbey at Chester. The third is another copy of the Polychronicon, printed by Caxton's successor Wynkyn de Worde in 1495. Nine specimens of early printed books (three German, five Italian and one printed in Ghent) were deposited by Lord Harlech between 1938 and 1941. Other notable incunabula in the Library are the Astronomica by Marcus Manilius (1474) with illuminated initials and borders, and Hartmann Schedel's Liber Chronicarum (1493).

During the time that the incunabula expert, Dr. Victor Scholderer, Deputy-Keeper in the Department of Printed Books at the British Museum, spent in Aberystwyth during the Second World War, he took an interest in the National Library's small collection of fifteenth-century printed books and produced a Hand-list of incunabula that was published as a supplement to the National Library of Wales Journal. The hand-list and its addenda and corrigenda describes 129 books, mostly printed in Germany, Italy and France, although examples from the Netherlands and England were also listed. Scholderer noted that some of the forty-five books printed in France, particularly those in the vernacular, were very rare.

==== Sixteenth-century imprints ====
There are approximately 2,500 sixteenth-century European imprints in the Library. Works from the leading scholar-printers of the early sixteenth-century are represented in the collection, which covers a broad array of subjects. These include Johann Froben (Basle), Jodocus Badius (Lyons and Paris), Robert Estienne (Paris) and Aldus Manutius (Venice). Aldus Manutius of Venice, who is known for his dolphin and anchor printer's device, was the finest of the Italian printers of this period and about a hundred examples of his works, known as Aldines, are in the National Library. The Library's also owns works from the sixteenth-century Antwerp press of Christophe Plantin and his son-in-law, Balthasar Moretus, who published De Symbolis Heroicis (1634) with its title-page designed by Peter Paul Rubens. The collection of French medieval romances and editions of the Roman de la rose from the library of F. W. Bourdillon and the Aldines, which are from the collection of J. Burleigh James, are important features.

The National Library of Wales has one of the two copies of the 1539 edition of Miles Coverdale's Great Bible, that were printed on vellum and illuminated throughout. The other copy is in the library of St. John's College, Cambridge.

==== Private presses ====
The Library has a substantial private press collection, some 1,800 volumes in total, with representative examples from all of the important British presses. The holdings of ordinary and special bindings of the Gregynog Press books are comprehensive and along with the reference collection from Gregynog, form the core of the National Library's collection of private press editions. However, the Library also has a complete set of the Kelmscott Press publications that Sir John Williams collected, including The Works of Geoffrey Chaucer (1896). The private press collection has been developed through further acquisitions by donation, purchase and legal deposit, and contains examples of the productions by the Doves Press, Ashendene Press and the Roxburghe Club. Works from foreign presses have been collected and include many publications of the Grolier Club, the Bremer Presse edition of Luther's Bible (1926–1928) and Eclogues of Virgil (1927) from the Cranach Press

==== Fine bindings ====
The National Library has many examples of books with fine bindings in its holdings. These include under-painted vellum, Victorian carved wood and papier-mâché bindings, French art nouveau bookbinding and bindings by Bernard C. Middleton and the Gregynog Press binder, George Fisher. In the late 1970s, the library acquired an archive recording the work of the Birdsall bindery, Northampton.

Bourdillon's library includes books printed before 1600 in their original pigskin or stamped calf bindings and some examples of modern fine binding.

Examples of fore-edge paintings that depict topographical scenes in Wales have been collected by the National Library, including a view of Conway Castle and Bridge on a 1795 copy of The Poetical Works of John Cunningham, a rural view, stated to be Wales, painted on a 1795 edition of Milton's Paradise Lost bound by Edwards of Halifax, and an 1823 English-Welsh bilingual edition of The Book of Common Prayer with a double fore-edge painting of (1) Bangor and (2) Bangor Cathedral. Other locations in Wales include Barmouth and Neath Abbey, both painted on books published during the nineteenth century. The earliest volume with a fore-edge painting owned by the Library is the 1669 Book of Common Prayer with a depiction of the Crucifixion.

==== The Euclid Collection ====
The National Library's collection of works ascribed to Euclid contains more than 300 volumes, representing 270 editions, and is considered to be an important reference point for Euclidean bibliographical studies. The collection has been developed through additions to the initial thirty-nine volumes of early editions of the Elements that Sir Charles Thomas-Stanford donated in 1927, including further eleven volumes from Sir Charles in 1928. With the subsequent additions the collection covers all of Euclid's works, including Data, Phaenomena, Optica and Catoptrica along with numerous editions of the Elements, in many languages. There are two incunabula (Erhard Ratdolt, Venice, 1482 and Leonardus de Basilea & Gulielmus de Papia, Vicenza, 1491) in the collection, as well as seventy-three volumes from the sixteenth century, including the first English (Reynold Wolfe, London, 1551) and Arabic (Typographia Medicea, Rome, 1594) editions.

=== Archives ===
The National Library of Wales is home to the largest collection of archival material in Wales. Around 2,500 archives of various sizes have been collected since the library was founded. These archives contain many different types of document, such as charters, estate records, correspondence, literary drafts and digital materials, which range from the medieval to contemporary periods. Many of the earlier archives are those of the landed gentry and their estates, which developed over many centuries, but these are supplemented by corporate archives including the Church of Wales archive and the archive of the Court of Great Sessions that the Library has received. The Library collects corporate archives, which are the records of institutions, societies and public bodies, and the personal archives of individuals who have played a significant role in the life of the nation. Personal archives contain a variety of material that is related to the life and work of notable individuals and families. For example, the papers of Celtic scholar Sir Idris Foster include correspondence, personal papers, scholarly and academic notes, and papers relating to organisations and societies, such as the Honourable Society of Cymmrodorion, the University of Wales and the Church in Wales.

==== The Welsh Political Archive ====
All materials concerning politics in Wales are kept in the Welsh Political Archive that the National Library established in 1983. This archive coordinates the collection of manuscript, printed and audiovisual records relating to the major political parties active in Wales, with the largest party archive being Plaid Cymru, and notable politicians including Lloyd George. The records of organisations including the Welsh National Council of the United Nations Association and the Association of Welsh Local Authorities also to be found in this archive, as are papers generated by the Parliament for Wales Campaign 1953–6, and several nationalist pressure groups.

Some of the political archives cannot be accessed due to their embargo status.

==== Modern Literary Archives ====
The Modern Literary Archives are home to the work of some of the most important Welsh poets and authors. An insight into the creation of prose and poetry is provided by the letters, manuscript and typescript drafts, notebooks, proofs and other personal papers of 20th and 21st century writers. Archives belonging to Welsh-language authors, Welsh authors writing in English and literary organisations are deposited in the National Library.

Papers and manuscripts belonging to Welsh authors who achieved their fame during the 20th century have been collected by the Library. The Archives of Welsh Authors include the work of authors, poets, playwrights, scholars, journalists and archdruids of the Gorsedd. Significant holding from these archives include draft copies of novels: Cysgod y Cryman [The Shadow of the Sickle] by Islwyn Ffowc Elis, Y Stafell Ddirgel [The Secret Room] by Marion Eames and Cyfres Rwdlan by Angharad Tomos; Saunders Lewis's letters, and the correspondence between Rhydwen Williams and Alwyn D. Rees; the diaries of Caradog Prichard and Euros Bowen; and, manuscript copies of poetry, such as Y Mynach by Gwenallt, Y Mynydd by T. H. Parry-Williams and Cerddi'r Gaeaf by R. Williams Parry. Parry-Williams and Williams Parry were both first cousins of Thomas Parry, the National Librarian.

Dylan Thomas is the most prominent name amongst the Anglo-Welsh authors and the Library has a large collection of his papers. Other important items in the Archives of Welsh Writers in English are Raymond Williams' drafts of the novels Border Country and People of the Black Mountains and the papers of David Jones, which include draft copies of In Parenthesis and The Anathemata.

Prominent holdings in the Archives of Literary Organisations, Journals and Publishers are the National Eisteddfod of Wales, BBC Wales, the Welsh Arts Council and the Welsh Academy. The archive of the National Eisteddfod of Wales contains the central office records, compositions, adjudications and criticisms from 1886 onwards. The Eisteddfod is a unique institution and an important part of the literary tradition of Wales that celebrates poetry, song and the Welsh language. The substantial archive of BBC Wales includes radio drama scripts and talks by well-known authors. A further collection of Welsh authors archives is available in the papers of the Welsh Arts Council.

==== Screen and Sound Archive ====
The Screen and Sound Archive contains The Life Story of David Lloyd George, a 1918 biographical film, which is thought to be the first feature-length biopic of a living politician. It was included on the UK Memory of the World Register in 2010.

A 2001 documentary film, Against the Dying of the Light, was produced about the work of the Archive.

==== Penrice and Margam Estate Records ====
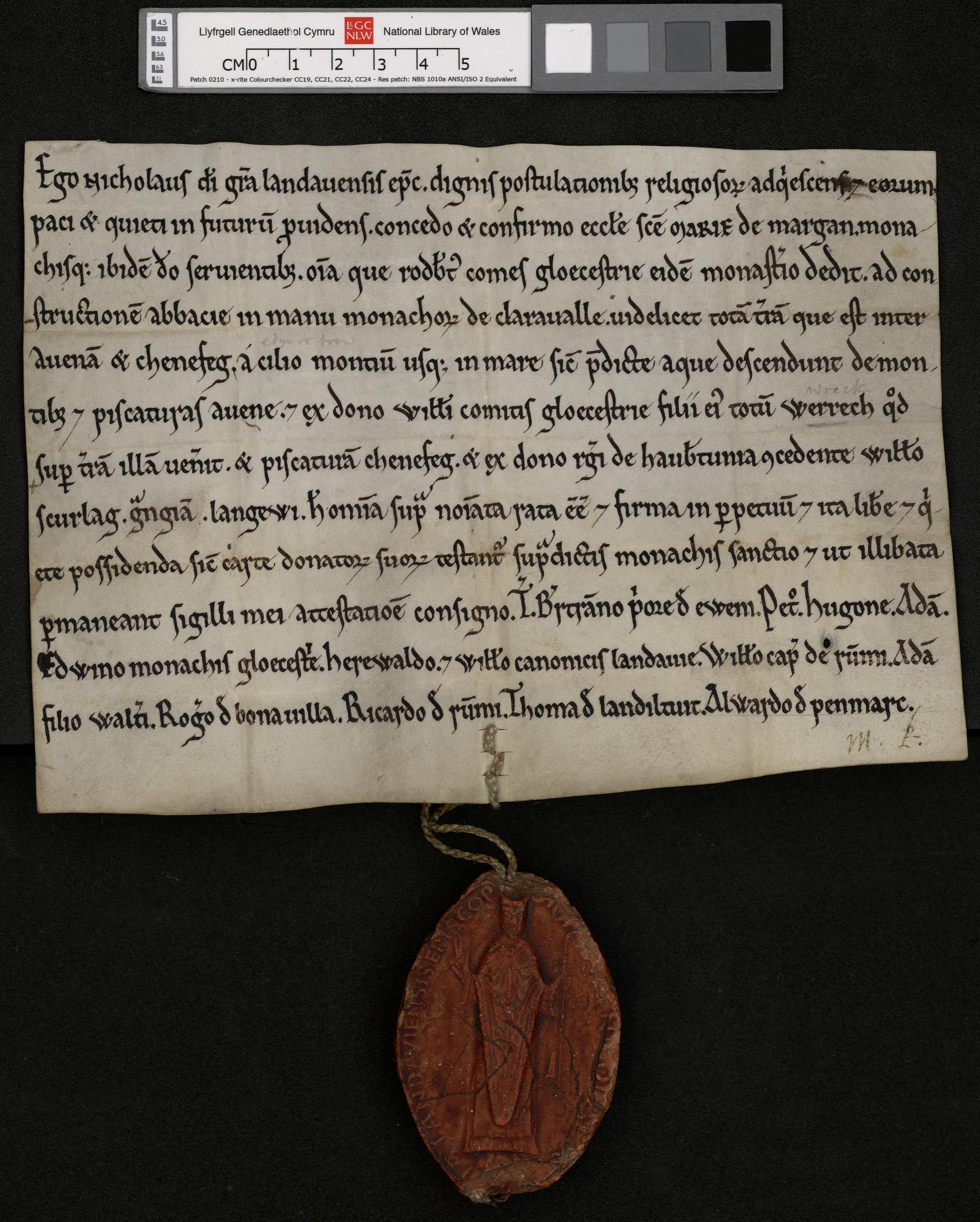
NLW Penrice and Margam Deeds 1

This extensive collection of estate and family records that was preserved at Penrice Castle in the possession of Miss Talbot of Margam contains manuscript material from the twelfth to nineteenth centuries. This includes the Margam Abbey archive which is one of the fullest surviving British monastic archives with charters from the period of the initial foundation of the Abbey at Pendar, its relocation to Margam, and the dissolution of the monastery.

Along with the manuscripts are numerous seal impressions which are themselves of historic importance. A collection of more than 30,000 seal impressions dating from the twelfth century onwards is preserved in the National Library of Wales, with examples including the seals of Welsh princes, ecclesiastic and papal seals, and in a variety of designs.

=== Pictures ===
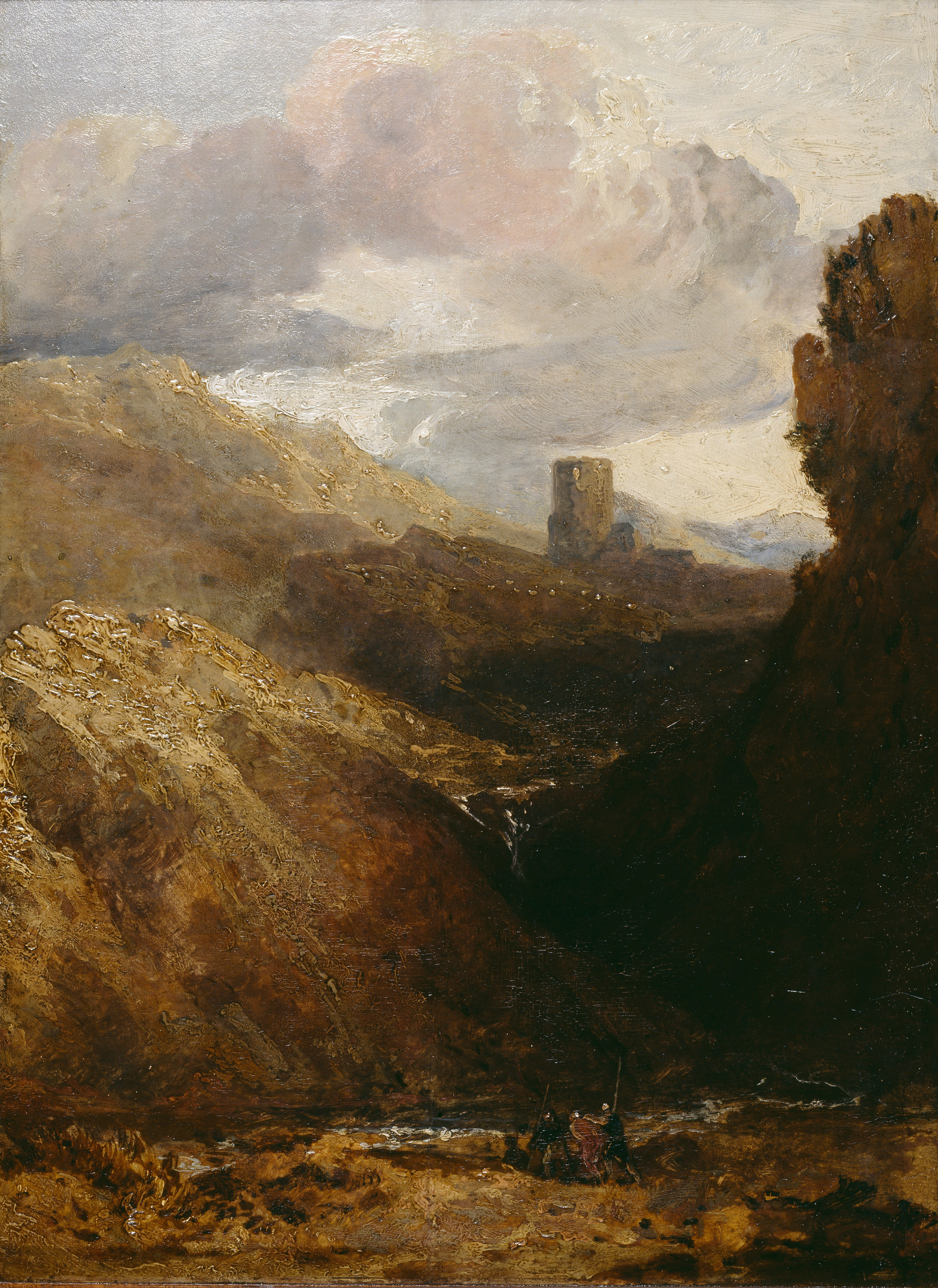
J. M. W. Turner – Dolbadarn Castle

The charter of the National Library of Wales states that pictures should be collected which portray places in Wales or people of Welsh background. Images in a number of different media are collected including paintings, drawings, prints and digital formats. The collection contains over 4000 framed paintings and drawings including paintings of Dolbadarn Castle and Aberdulais Mill by J. M. W. Turner and examples of the work of the landscape artist Richard Wilson, who influenced Turner, and Wilson's pupil, Thomas Jones of Pencerrig.

A set of original drawings of Welsh scenes that Thomas Rowlandson made during his 1797 tour of Wales with Henry Wigstead, and a set of original drawings of castles, abbeys and cities by Samuel and Nathaniel Buck were donated by Sir John Williams. The Library also has some two hundred original watercolour drawings of Welsh landscapes by John Warwick Smith, and collections of original drawings of Welsh interest by Philip J. de Loutherbourg and S. H. Grimm. The collection of engraved prints illustrate a wide variety of Welsh topography and aspects of Welsh culture, and also show the development of the art of engraving. Every method of engraving is represented in the collection, which also contains examples of the work of famous engravers.

There are around 15,000 Welsh portraits in various media and a further 50,000 photographs and negatives in the Library's collection. Portraits include the National Library's main benefactors, Sir John Williams, Sir John Herbert Lewis, Lord Rendel, and Lord Davies of Llandinam; prominent Welsh individuals including David Lloyd George and Hwfa Môn; and, those by artists with a connection to Wales, such as Hugh Hughes, William Roos and Christopher Williams. Self-portraits by modern Welsh artists are also collected and include Keith Andrew, David Jones, Charles Tunnicliffe and Kyffin Williams. There are also many photographic portraits of Welsh individuals in the 1880s and 1890s that were taken by John Thomas.

There is a large collection of the work of Kyffin Williams in the Library, which includes his paintings of north Wales, sketches and watercolours of the Welsh colony in Patagonia and caricature portraits. Kyffin Williams bequeathed a significant part of his estate, including his own works and archives, to the National Library when he died in 2006.

=== Photographs ===
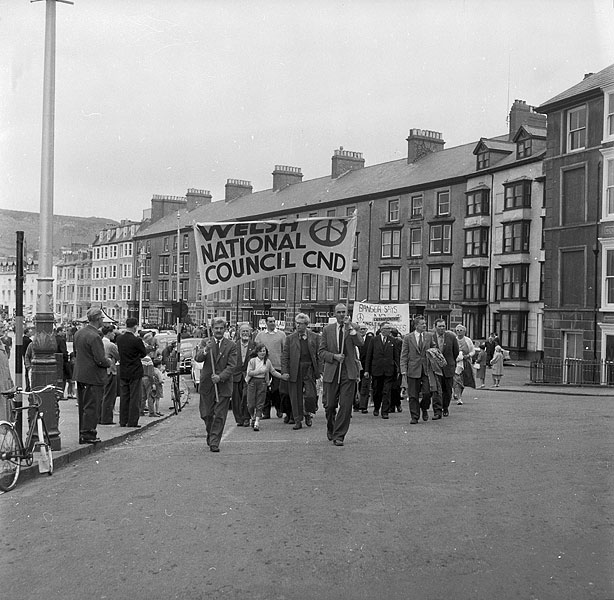
CND rally, Aberystwyth

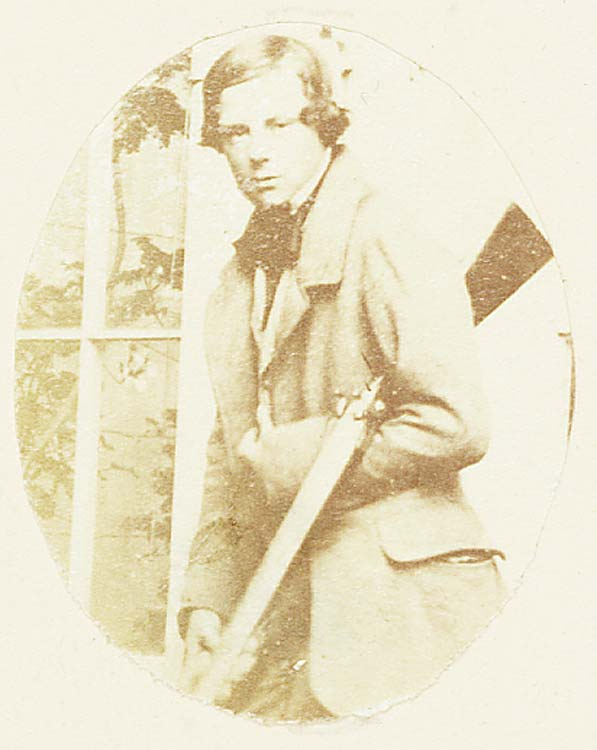
John Talbot Dillwyn Llewelyn carrying a gun

The Library holds a collection of more than 800,000 photographs, including the earliest-known photograph in Wales. The daguerreotype of Margam Castle, made by Reverend Calvert Richard Jones, dates from 1841. Many other examples of photography from the 1840s and 1850s, such as the early Swansea photography of the Dillwyn Llewelyn family, are kept in the National Collection of Welsh Photographs. This collection also contains mounted portraits by high-street photographers, topographic views and portraits by John Thomas and scenic postcard photography by Francis Frith that are connected to Wales.

During his career as a photojournalist, Geoff Charles produced a photographic archive that records life in Wales from the 1930s until the 1970s. The Geoff Charles Photographic Collection is the largest individual collection in the Library with 120,000 negatives. This unique contribution to Welsh photography is being preserved and digitised with sponsorship from the Big Lottery Fund.

=== Maps ===
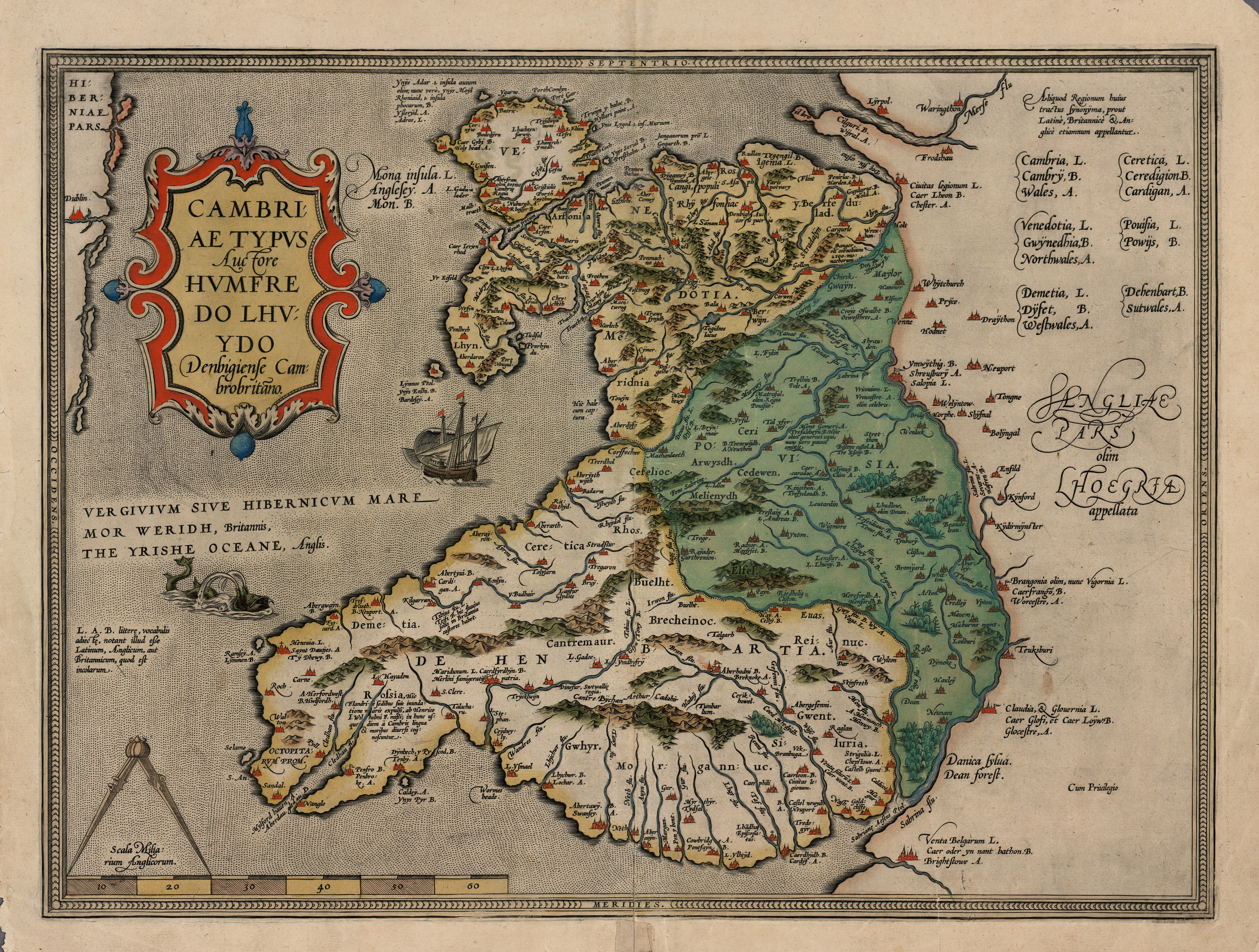
The first printed map of Wales from 1574 – Cambriae Typus by Humphrey Llwyd

There are over 1.5 million maps in the Library's collections. There are maps on paper, parchment, cloth, wood, metal and digital media. These formats include a range of material such as globes, manuscript items, a 15th-century woodcut print, copper printing plates, carpet-sized map of Britain and Ordnance Survey digital data.

The Ordnance Survey Maps Collection includes near-to-complete coverage for Wales, beginning with photocopies of the Ordnance Surveyor's drawings that formed the basis of the first edition of the one-inch-to-the-mile map which was published in 1818.

The collection of antiquarian printed mapping is substantial and includes examples of Humphrey Llwyd's Cambriae typus (1574), the first printed map specifically of Wales, and the first county maps of Wales. In 2000, Peter Bellwood stole at least fifty antique maps from the Library, which were sold to private collectors for £70,000. Arrested in 2004, he was jailed for four and a half years.

A complete set of tithe maps, covering almost the whole of Wales, is housed in the National Library. The Welsh Church Commission Collection, which, in 1944, was deposited in the Library, includes the diocesan copies of the tithe maps that were transferred to the Commission in 1920 following the disestablishment of the Church of Wales. They are an important source for the study of mid-nineteenth century Wales and, therefore, are the most frequently used collection of maps and one of the most consulted categories of documents in the Library. The Cynefin Project is digitising over 1100 tithe maps and transcribing the appointment documents to link them together. The project is planned for completion in September 2016.

Other holdings in the maps collection include: manuscript estate maps, enclosure maps, estate sale catalogues, railway plans, architectural drawings, mining plans, and nautical and aeronautical charts.

== Publications ==
The National Library of Wales has published a series of books about its history and collections, including manuscript catalogues, a bibliography of Welsh publications, Parish Registers of Wales, and academic studies of Gwen John and Kyffin Williams. The Library also publishes the National Library of Wales Journal.

Between 1909 and 1984, the Library published Bibliotheca Celtica in fulfilment of the terms of its charter to keep a register of books printed in Welsh and other Celtic languages or relating to Wales and the Celtic nations. In 1985 Bibliotheca Celtica was merged with the Subject Index to Welsh Periodicals to form A Bibliography of Wales (Llyfryddiaeth Cymru). In 1987, the retrospective bibliography Libri Walliae: a catalogue of Welsh books and books printed in Wales 1546–1820 was published.

== Digital content ==
Many of the most important manuscripts and books at the Library have been digitised and made freely available to view on the library's website in its "Digital Mirror".

In April 2012, the Library made a policy decision not to claim ownership of copyright in digital reproductions. This meant that the rights information attached to digital representations of works would reflect the copyright status of the original (i.e., that originals in the public domain would remain in the public domain in their digital form). The Library has applied this policy to projects delivered since then (the Welsh Journals Online and Cymru1914) and is still in the process of updating rights information for its pre-2012 projects. Metadata are released into the public domain using the CC0 licence.

The Library has experience of sharing content from its collections under open content licences on platforms such as Wikipedia (e.g., the John Thomas photographic collection) and Flickr. In February 2013, the Library contributed 50 images relating to Monmouthshire to Wikipedia, a successful pilot project with Wikimedia UK. The following month, they became one of the cultural heritage organisations that partnered with Wikimedia Nederland, Wikimedia UK and Wikimedia France, together with Europeana, to be part of their collaboration to provide a set of tools to mass upload material from GLAM institutions to Wikimedia Commons. Also in 2013, the Library was awarded the Wikimedia UK 'GLAM (Galleries, Libraries, Archives and Museums) of the Year Award', for being "a reliable supporter of the Wikimedia movement aims". By January 2016 almost 8,000 images had been made available for free download.

In January 2015, the Library, in partnership with Wikimedia UK, appointed a full-time Wikipedian in Residence with the aim of developing further its resources on an open licence for a worldwide audience.

The "Cynefin: Mapping Wales' Sense of Place" project has created a unified tithe map of Wales by digitising over a thousand tithe maps. Cynefin is a partnership between Archives Wales, the National Library of Wales and People's Collection Wales that was launched in November 2014. A valuable online tool for historical research is being produced by crowdsourcing the contributions of volunteers through the Cynefin website to transcribe the apportionment documents and link them to the digitised tithe maps.

The Kyffin Williams Bequest Project was set up to catalogue and digitise the material that Kyffin Williams bequeathed to the National Library of Wales on his death in 2006. In addition to the collection of artwork, the bequest also included funds to cover this project. The cataloguing work began in 2008 and the digitisation started in 2009.

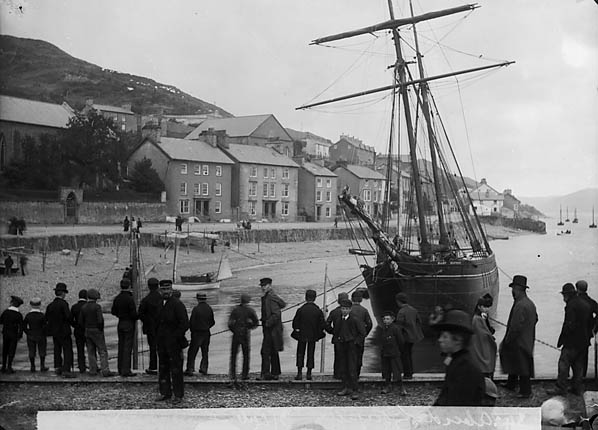
A group of men and boys standing on the quayside, Aberdyfi. Aberdyfi Regatta. John Thomas c. 1885

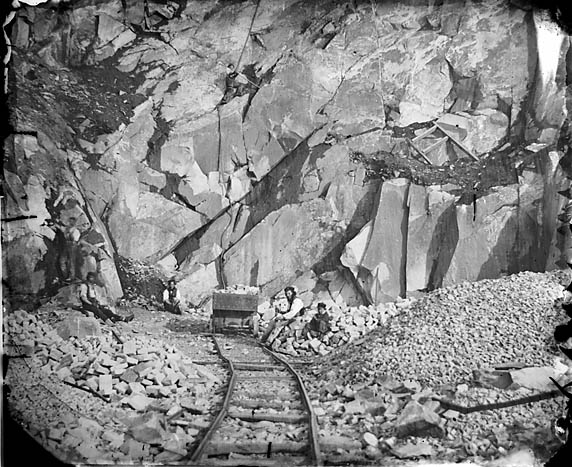
Chwarel Sets, at Trefor; John Thomas c. 1875

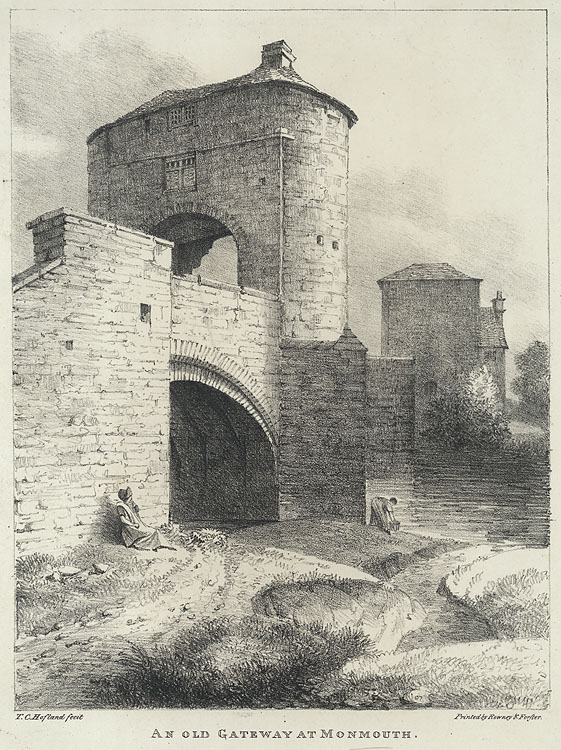
Thomas Christopher Hofland's 'An old gateway at Monmouth' lithograph; 1825

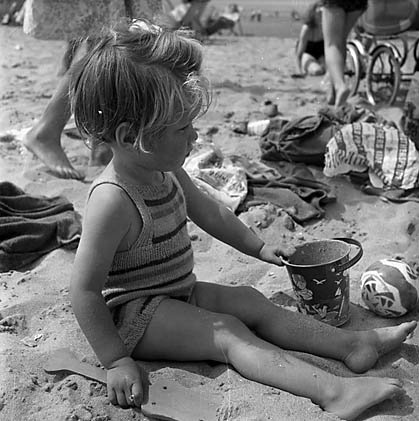
An image from the Geoff Charles (1909–2002) Collection: a Sunday school trip to Rhyl; Geoff Charles 20 July 1955

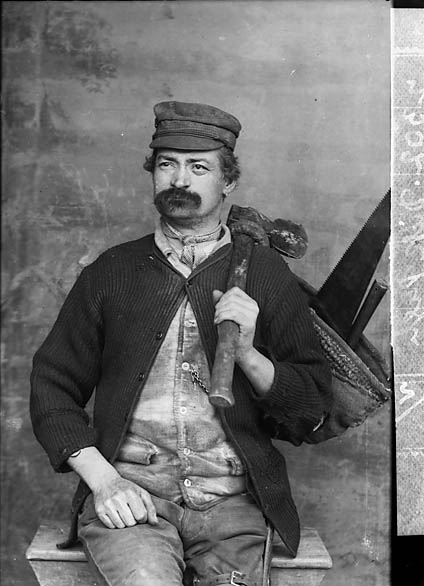
Dick Puw; John Thomas c. 1875

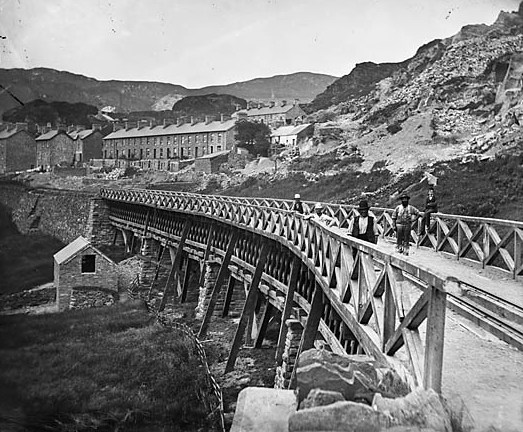
Viaduct on the Festiniog and Blaenau Railway, Blaenau Ffestiniog, Wales; John Thomas c. 1875

=== Welsh Journals Online ===
The National Library of Wales has digitised the back-numbers of 50 journals relating to Wales, in Welsh and English, in the Welsh Journals Online project funded by Jisc. It forms the largest body of Welsh text on the Web, and as well as allowing free access for all to scholarly articles on history, literature and science, and poems and book reviews. OCR of the page scans was undertaken to create TEI searchable text versions. The website contains a total of 400,000 pages. It is intended to add new issues of the titles as they emerge from the embargo period agreed with the publisher.

The fifty titles include:

- Archaeologia Cambrensis 1846–1999
- Yr Arloeswr ('the pioneer') 1957–1960
- Bathafarn 1946–2003
- Brycheiniog 1955–2006
- Bwletin Cymdeithas Emynau Cymru ('bulletin of the Welsh hymns society') 1968–2003
- Cambria: a Welsh geographical review 1974–1989
- Cennad ('messenger') 1980–2001
- Ceredigion 1951–2004
- Y Cofiadur ('the recorder') 1923–2002
- Contemporary Wales 1987–2001
- Cristion ('Christian') 1983–2006
- Y Cymmrodor 1822–1951
- Cymru 1891–1927
- Efrydiau Athronyddol 1938–2000
- Fflam, Y ('the flame') 1946–1952
- Y ford gron ('the round table') 1930–1935
- Gower 1948–2005
- Gwent Local History, the journal of Gwent Local History Council 1977–2006
- Y Gwyddonydd ('the scientist') 1963–1996
- Heddiw ('today') 1936–1942
- Journal of the Pembrokeshire Historical Society 1985–2004
- Journal of the Welsh Bibliographical Society 1910–1984
- Journal of Welsh Ecclesiastical History 1984–1992
- Journal of Welsh Religious History 1993–2005
- Llafur ('labour'), the journal of the Society for the Study of Welsh Labour History 1972–2004
- Y Llenor ('the reader') 1922–1955
- Lleufer: cylchgrawn Cymdeithas Addysg y Gweithwyr yng Nghymru (Journal of the Workers' Educational Association in Wales) 1944–1979
- Minerva: transactions of the Royal Institution of South Wales 1993–2006
- Montgomeryshire Collections, relating to Montgomeryshire and its borders 1868–2002
- Morgannwg, transactions of the Glamorgan Local History Society 1957–2006
- National Library of Wales Journal 1939–2005
- Nature in Wales, the quarterly journal of the West Wales Field Society 1955–1987
- Pembrokeshire historian, journal of the Pembrokeshire Local History Society 1959–1981
- Presenting Monmouthshire, the journal of the Monmouthshire Local History Council (now Gwent Local History Council) 1956–1975
- Proceedings of the South Wales Institute of Engineers 1857–1998
- Radnorshire Society Transactions 1931–2004
- Reports and Transactions, Cardiff Naturalists' Society 1867–1986
- South Wales Record Society publications 1987–1994
- Studia Celtica 1966–2000
- Tir Newydd ('new land') 1935–1939
- Y Traethodydd ('the essayist') 1845–2006
- Transactions and archaeological record, Cardiganshire Antiquarian Society 1911–1938
- Transactions of the Honourable Society of Cymmrodorion 1892–2005
- Wales 1937–1959
- Welsh Book Studies (Llyfr yng Nghymru)) 1998–2007
- Welsh History Review (Cylchgrawn hanes cymru) 1959–2001
- Welsh Music History 1996–2004
- Welsh Outlook 1914–1933

=== Welsh Newspapers Online ===
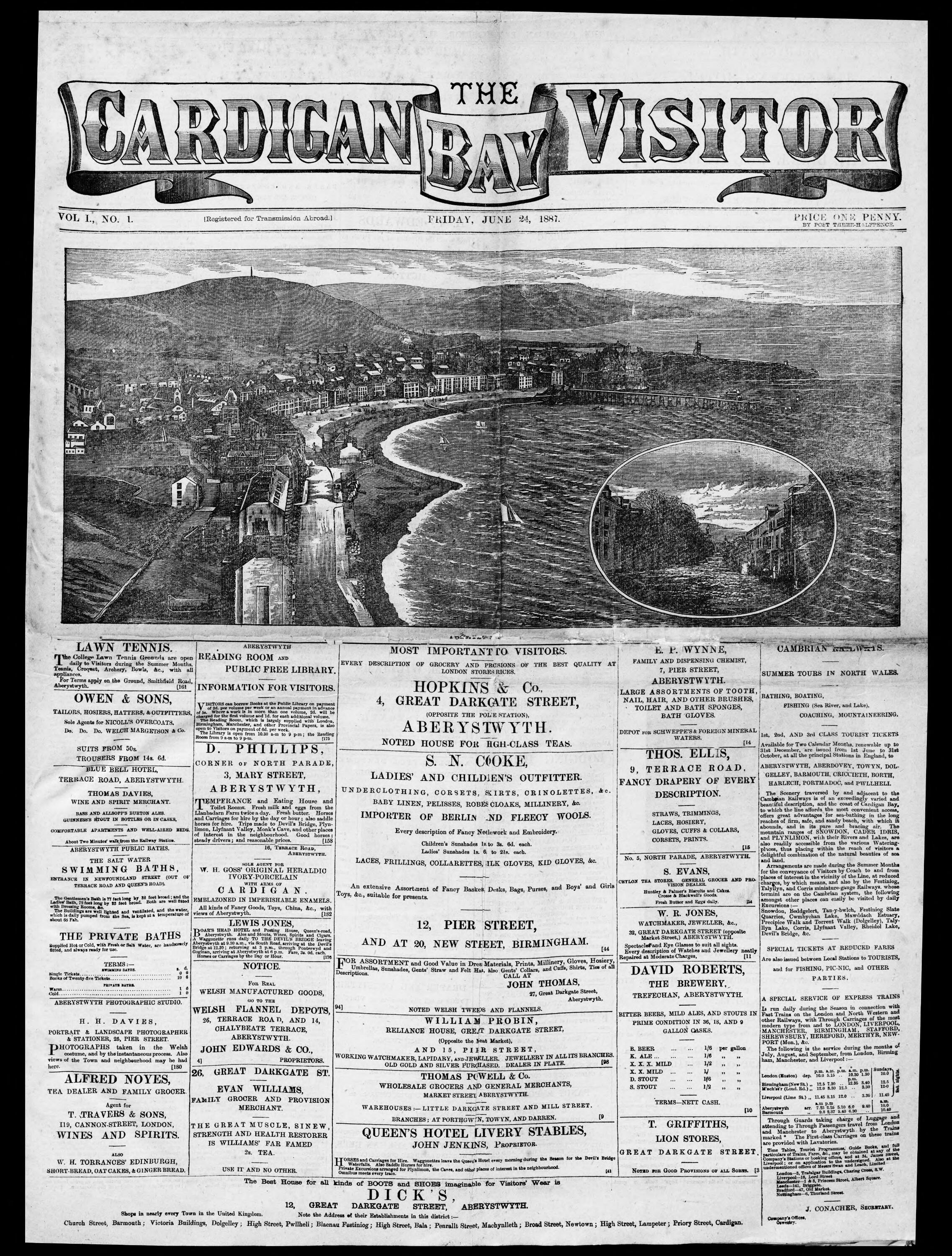
The Cardigan Bay Visitor, 24 June 1887

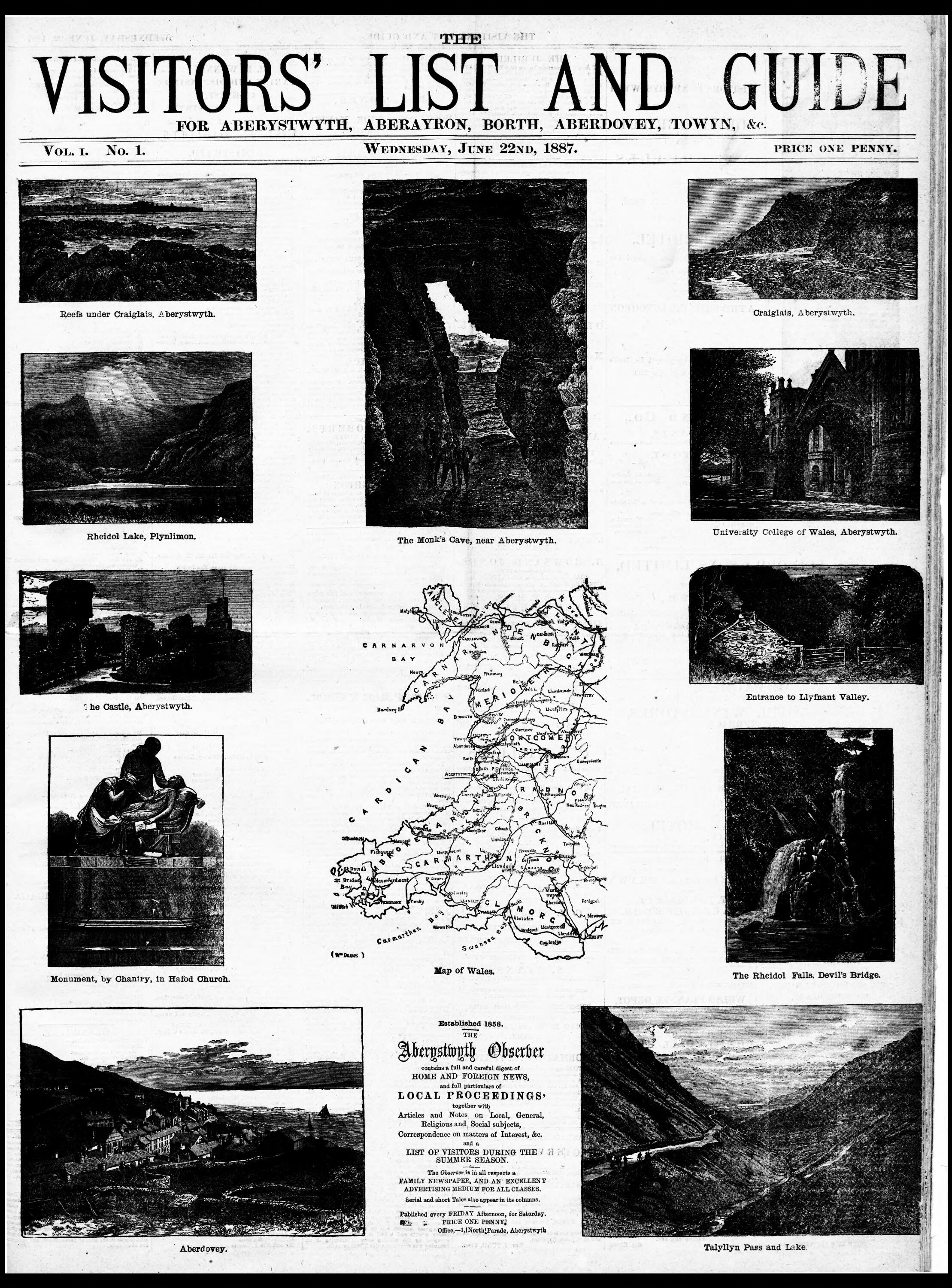
The Visitor's List and Guide, 22 June 1887

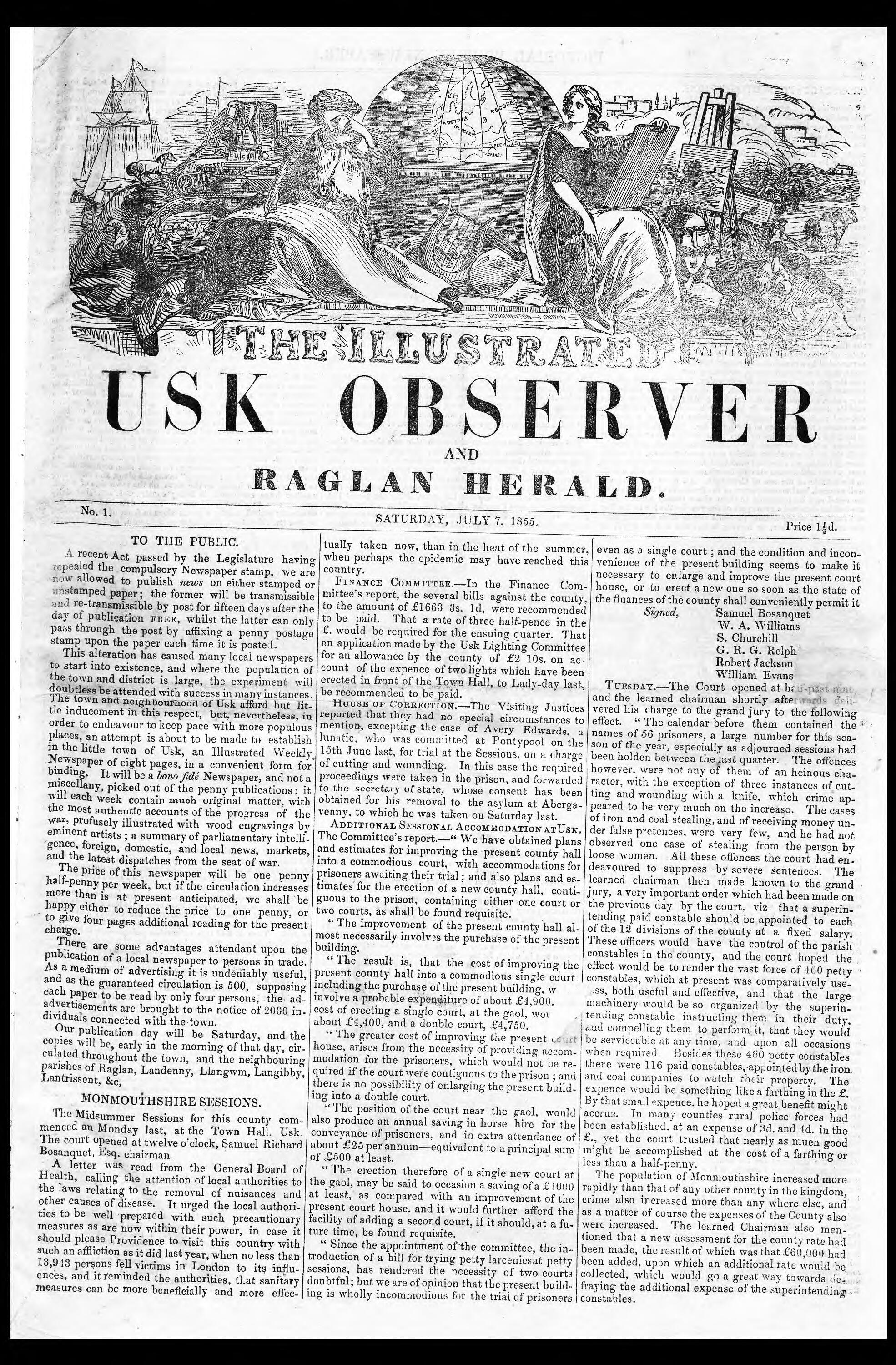
The Illustrated Usk Observer, 7 July 1855

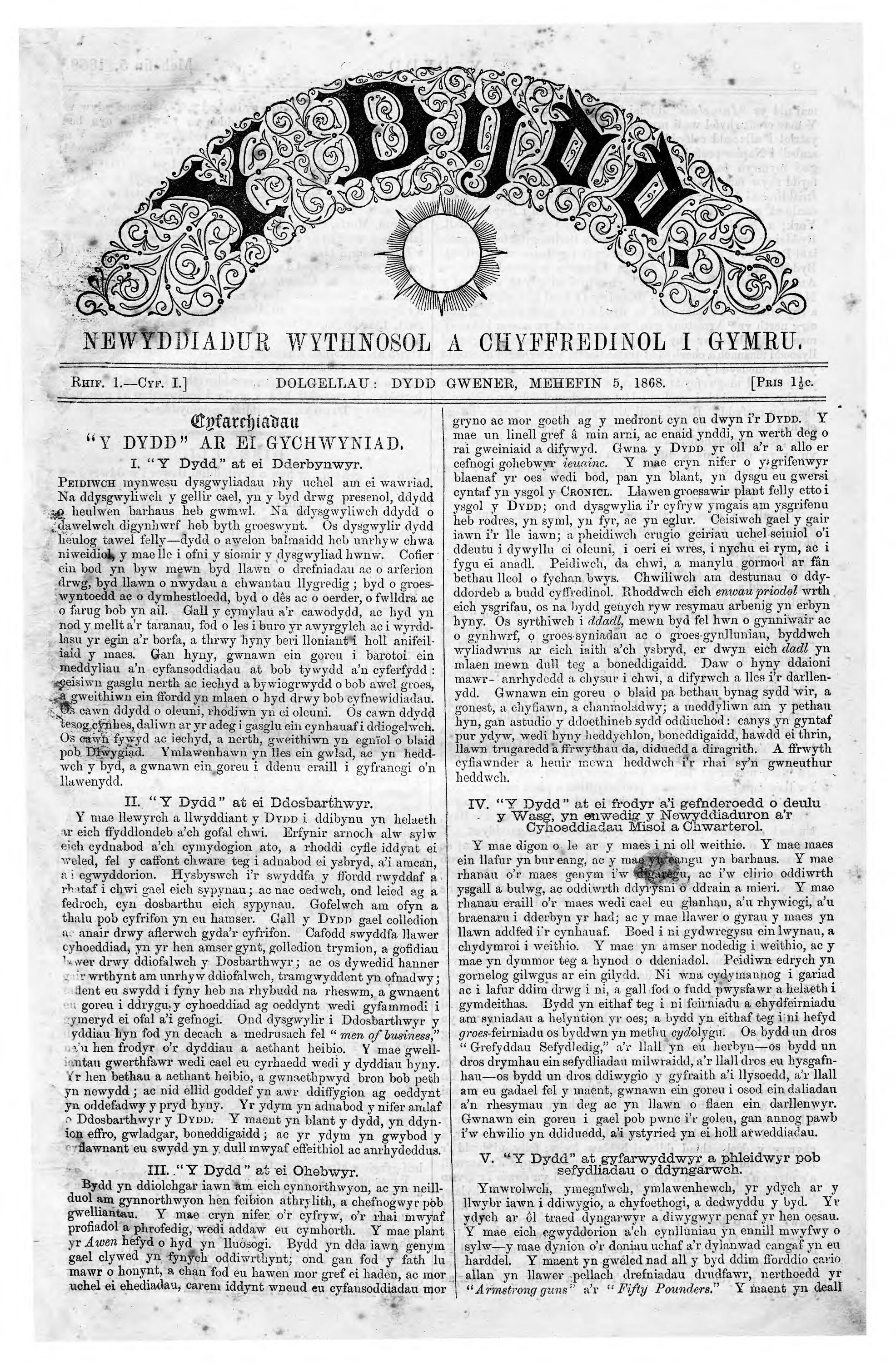
Y Dydd, 5 June 1868

Welsh Newspapers Online is an open access database of Welsh regional newspapers that has been created from the National Library of Wales' collection of historical newspapers. The database includes nearly 120 newspapers titles and provides access to over 1,100,000 pages from the years before 1919. Content relating to the First World War that has been digitised is also included in the database. The following publications are included:

- Aberdare Leader 1902–1910; 1913–1919
- Aberdare Times 1861–1902
- Abergavenny Chronicle 1909–1910; 1914–1919
- Abergavenny Mail 1914
- Aberystwyth Observer 1858–1861; 1864–1900; 1902–1910
- Aberystwyth Times 1868–1870
- Aberystwyth Visitors' List and Guide 1887
- Adsain 1906; 1914–1919
- Amman Valley Chronicle 1913–1919
- Amserau 1846–59
- Baner ac Amserau Cymru 1857–1910; 1914–1919
- Barmouth and County Advertiser 1914–1917
- Barry Dock News 1889–1910; 1914–1918
- Barry Herald 1896–1910
- Brecon and Radnor Express 1914–1918
- Brecon County Times 1866–1869; 1900; 1905–1910; 1913–1919
- Brecon Reporter 1865–1867
- Brython (Lerpwl) 1914–1919
- Brython Cymreig 1892–1901; 1906–1910
- Carnarvon and Denbigh Herald 1836–1910
- Cambrian Daily Leader 1913; 1914–1918; 1919
- Cambrian 1804–1860; 1870–1910
- Cambrian News 1860–1910; 1914–1919
- Cardiff and Merthyr Guardian 1845–1874
- Cardiff Times 1858–1910
- Cardigan Bay Visitor 1887–1905
- Cardigan Observer 1878–1897
- Carmarthen Journal 1810–1812; 1828–1831; 1889–1893; 1901–1910; 1913–1919
- Carmarthen Weekly Reporter 1860–1910; 1913–1919
- Celt 1878–1879; 1881–1906
- Cheshire Observer 1901–1908
- Chester Courant 1897–1908
- Clorianydd 1897–1907; 1909–1910; 1914–1919
- Colwyn Bay & North Wales Weekly News 1892; 1894–1907
- County Echo [Pembrokeshire] 1893–1896; 1901–1910
- County Observer and Monmouthshire Central Advertiser 1867–1878; 1881–1884; 1899–1908
- Cymro a'r Celt Llundain 1907–1910
- Cymro [Lerpwl a'r Wyddgrug] 1890–1907; 1914–1919
- Darian 1914–1919
- Demetian Mirror 1840
- Denbighshire Free Press 1882–1910; 1914–1919
- Dinesydd Cymreig 1914–1919
- Drafod 1913–1919
- Drych 1875–1878; 1881–1900; 1914–1919
- Dydd 1868–1870; 1872–1890; 1892–1910; 1914–1919
- Evening Express 1891–1899; 1900–1910 1900–1910
- Flintshire Observer 1864–1900; 1907–1910; 1913–1915
- Genedl 1914–1917
- Genedl Gymreig
- Glamorgan Free Press 1897–1899
- Glamorgan Gazette 1894–1895; 1906–1910; 1914–1919
- Glamorgan, Monmouth and Brecon Gazette and Merthyr Guardian 1832–1843
- Goleuad 1869–1910; 1914–1919 1869–1910
- Gwalia 1883; 1897–1910
- Gwladgarwr 1858–1882
- Gwyliedydd 1877–1908
- Gwyliedydd Newydd 1910; 1914–1919
- Haverfordwest and Milford Haven Telegraph 1857–1910; 1914–1919
- Herald Cymraeg 1901–1910; 1914–1919
- Herald of Wales and Monmouthshire Recorder 1897; 1914–1919
- Illustrated Usk Observer 1855–1866
- Llais Y Wlad 1874–1884
- Llais Llafur 1914–1919
- Y Llan 1881–1910; 1913–1919
- Llandudno Advertiser and List of Visitors 1896–1910
- Llanelly Mercury 1897; 1909–1910
- Llanelly Star 1910; 1914–1919
- Llangollen Advertiser 1868–1873; 1875–1903; 1905–1908; 1909–1910; 1914–1919
- London Kelt – Celt Llundain 1895–1904
- London Welshman – Cymro Llundain 1904–1906
- Merthyr Express 1864–1869; 1909–1910
- Merthyr Pioneer 1914–1919
- Merthyr Telegraph 1855–1881
- Merthyr Times 1895–1897
- Monmouth Guardian 1914–1919
- Monmouthshire Merlin 1829–1884
- Montgomery County Times 1893–1900
- Montgomeryshire Express and Radnor Times 1892–1908
- Negesydd 1895–1909
- North Wales Chronicle 1827–1900; 1914–1919
- North Wales Express 1878–1910
- North Wales Gazette 1808–1816; 1823–1825
- North Wales Times 1897–1900
- North Wales Weekly News 1909–1910
- Papur Pawb 1893–1904; 1909–1910
- Pembroke County Guardian 1898–1910
- Pembrokeshire Herald 1844–1891; 1901–1910
- Penarth Chronicle 1895
- Pontypool Free Press 1859–1869; 1872–1893
- Pontypridd Chronicle 1881–1883; 1886–1905
- Potter's Electric News 1859–1868
- Prestatyn Weekly 1905–1910
- Principality 1848–1850
- Rhedegydd 1878–1879; 1886; 1889; 1893–1910
- Rhondda Leader 1899–1910
- Rhos Herald 1909–1910
- Rhyl Advertiser 1878–1887; 1893
- Rhyl Journal 1889–1910
- Rhyl Record and Advertiser 1888–1910
- Seren Cymru 1851–1852; 1856–1857; 1860–1910; 1913; 1914–1918; 1919
- Seren Gomer 1814–1815
- South Wales Daily News 1872–1900
- South Wales Daily Post 1893–1900; 1910
- South Wales Echo 1880–1882; 1885–1900
- South Wales Star 1891–1894
- South Wales Weekly Post 1914–1919
- Swansea Gazette and Daily Shipping Register 1909–1910
- Tarian y Gweithiwr 1875–1910
- Tenby Observer 1854–1860; 1867–1889; 1909–1910
- Towyn on Sea and Merioneth County Times 1897–1905
- Tyst a'r Dydd 1871–1891
- Tyst Cymreig 1867–1870
- Tyst 1892–1910; 1914–1917
- Udgorn 1913–1918
- Weekly Mail 1879–1910
- Welsh Coast Pioneer 1900–1910
- Welsh Gazette 1899–1910
- Welshman 1835–1910
- Werin 1885–1900
- Western Mail 1869–1900
- Wrexham and Denbigh Weekly Advertiser 1854–1900
- Wrexham Guardian 1875–1879
- Wythnos a'r Eryr 1899–1903; 1909–1910

== In popular culture ==
- The library was the setting for award-winning 2017 film The Library Suicides, based on the book of the same name. Filming took place there in 2016.

== See also ==
- Books in the United Kingdom
- List of libraries in the United Kingdom
