= The Demetian Mirror =

English-language Welsh newspaper

- The Demetian Mirror or, Aberystwyth reporter, and visitants' informant forming a record of local events, and channel of general information
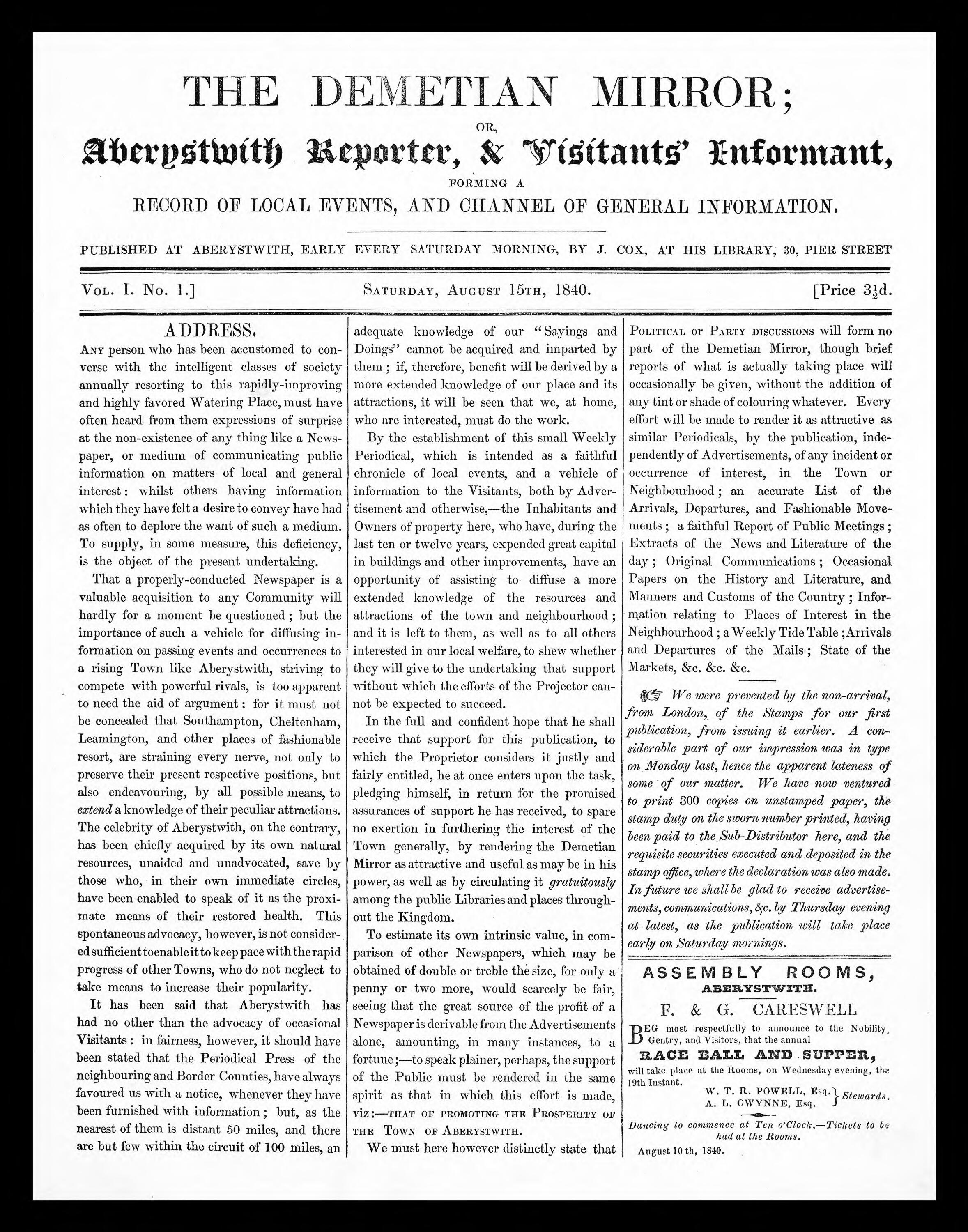
- Type: weekly newspaper
- Publisher: John Cox
- Editor: Evan Watkin[*]
- Launched: 15 August 1840
- City: Aberystwyth
- Country: Wales

The Demetian Mirror was an English-language newspaper published weekly in Carmarthenshire, Cardiganshire, and Pembrokeshire in Wales. It contained local news and information.

Welsh Newspapers Online has digitised twelve issues of The Demetian Mirror that were published in 1840, from the newspaper holdings of the National Library of Wales.
