= Pembrokeshire Historian =

The Pembrokeshire Historian: journal of the Pembrokeshire Local History Society was an annual English-language local history journal published by the Pembrokeshire Historical Society. It contains academic and general articles on historical and archaeological topics. In 1985 it was renamed Cylchgrawn Cymdeithas Hanesyddol Sir Benfro / Journal of the Pembrokeshire Historical Society.

The journal has been digitized by the Welsh Journals Online project at the National Library of Wales.
