= Welsh Music History =

- Discipline: Welsh music
- Language: English

Publication details
- History: 1996–present
- Publisher: University of Wales Press
- Frequency: Biennial

Standard abbreviations
- ISO 4: Welsh Music Hist.

Indexing
- ISSN: 1362-0681
- OCLC no.: 741727731

Welsh Music History / Hanes Cerddoriaeth Cymru is published by the University of Wales Press on behalf of the Centre for Advanced Welsh Music Studies, Bangor University. It is a biennial bilingual journal contain academic articles and reviews relating to Welsh music and music in Wales.

It is being digitised by the Welsh Journals Online project at the National Library of Wales.
