= Bathafarn =

English/Welsh-language magazine

- First issue: 1946
- Language: Welsh

Bathafarn, the magazine of the Historical Society of the Methodist Church in Wales, is a bilingual English and Welsh-language publication containing essays and book reviews. It was established in 1946 and based in Cardiff.

The journal has been digitised by the Welsh Journals Online project at the National Library of Wales.
