= Nature in Wales =

Defunct quarterly scientific journal

Nature in Wales was a quarterly scientific journal, mainly written in English but with some Welsh-language content, containing academic and general articles and book reviews, published from 1955 to 1987. From 1955 to 1981 it was published by West Wales Field Society; a new series was started when the National Museum of Wales took over in 1982.

Pembrokeshire Bird Protection Society was formed in 1938; in 1946 it changed its name to West Wales Field Society, then in 1962 to West Wales Naturalists' Trust. In 1981 it became Dyfed Wildlife Trust, and the National Museum of Wales took over publication of Nature in Wales.

The journal has been digitised by the Welsh Journals Online project at the National Library of Wales.
