= Llangollen Advertiser =

Former English-language newspaper in north Wales

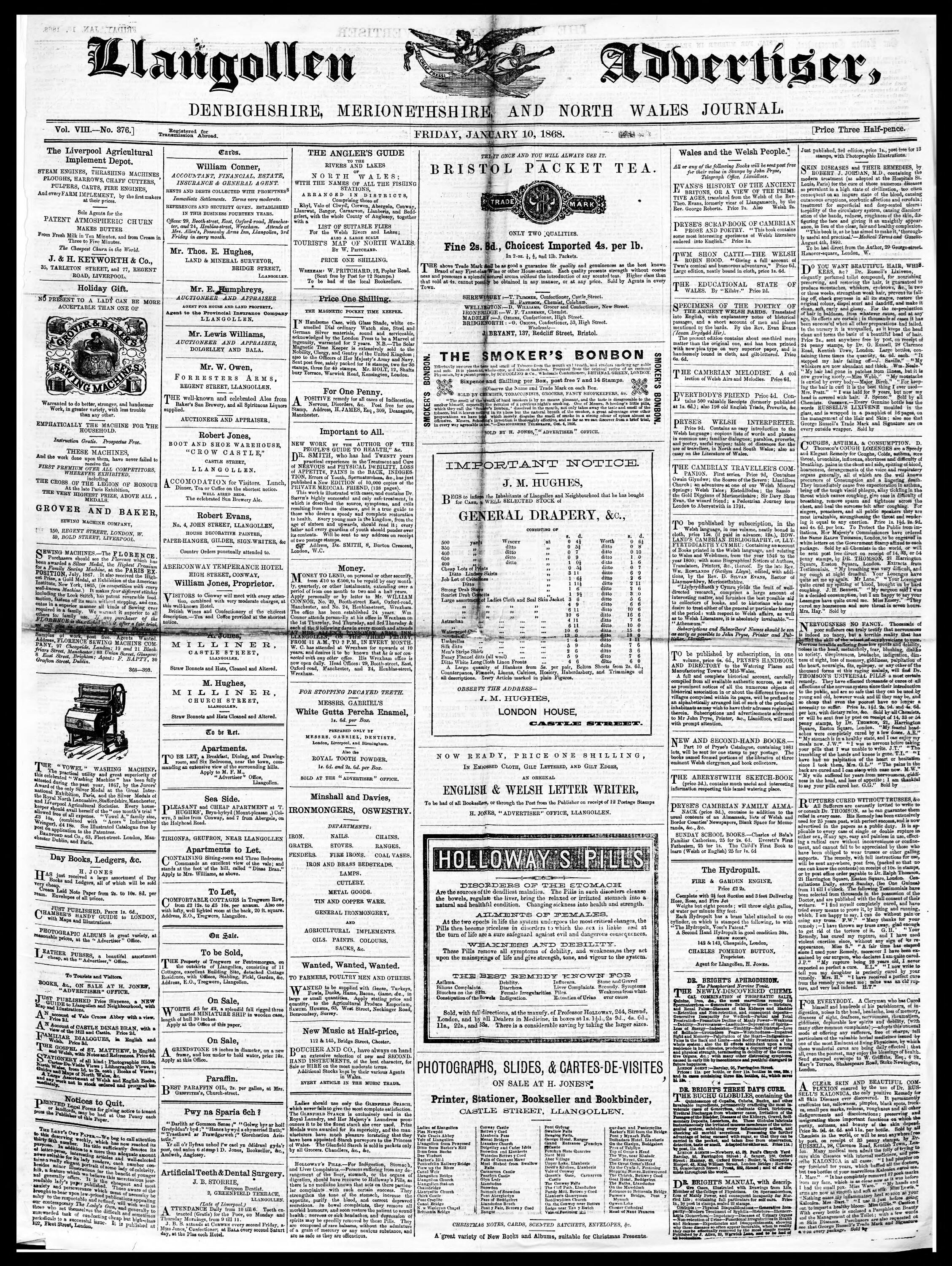
- The Llangollen advertiser, Denbighshire, Merionethshire and North Wales journal
- Type: weekly newspaper
- Publisher: Hugh Jones
- Editor: Hugh Jones[*]
- Launched: 2 November 1860
- City: Llangollen
- Country: Wales
- OCLC number: 766007626

The Llangollen Advertiser, Denbighshire, Merionethshire and North Wales Journal was a weekly English-language newspaper that circulated in Denbighshire, Merionethshire, and North Wales. It was first published on 2 November 1860.

Welsh Newspapers Online has digitised 2,311 issues of the Llangollen Advertiser (1868–1919) from the newspaper holdings of the National Library of Wales.
