= Efrydiau Athronyddol =

Welsh-language academic journal

Efrydiau Athronyddol (meaning 'philosophical studies') is a Welsh-language academic journal of philosophy published by the University of Wales Press on behalf of the Philosophy Section of the Guild of Graduates of the University of Wales. It contains philosophical papers, book reviews and obituaries.

The journal has been digitized by the Welsh Journals Online project at the National Library of Wales.
