= Haverfordwest & Milford Haven Telegraph =

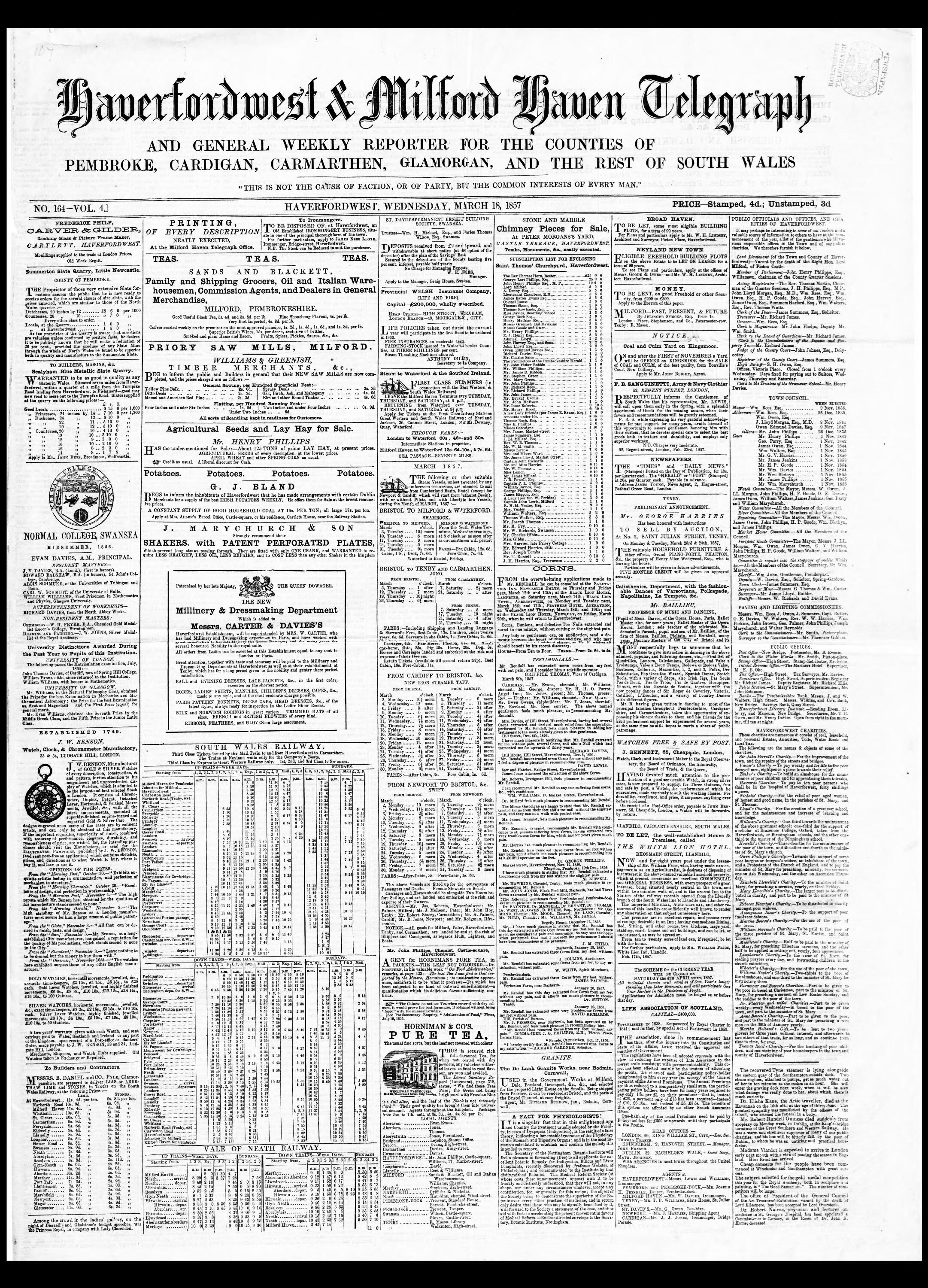
- Type: weekly newspaper
- City: Haverfordwest
- OCLC number: 751633611

Haverfordwest & Milford Haven Telegraph was a weekly English-language newspaper which circulated Pembrokeshire and Cardiganshire. The paper featured news coverage and editorials on the arts.

Welsh Newspapers Online has digitised 713 issues of the Haverfordwest & Milford Haven Telegraph (1857-1919) from the newspaper holdings of the National Library of Wales.
