= Yr Arloeswr =

Yr Arloeswr (Welsh: "the pioneer") was a Welsh-language literary magazine published between 1957 and 1960. It was edited by R. Gerallt Jones and Bedwyr Lewis Jones, and contained short stories, poems, and book reviews, and sometimes works of art. Its contributors included Gwyn Thomas and Bobi Jones.

The magazine has been digitised by the Welsh Journals Online project at the National Library of Wales.
