= National Library of Wales Journal =

- Discipline: History of Wales
- Language: English, Welsh

Publication details
- History: 1939-present
- Publisher: National Library of Wales (United Kingdom)
- Frequency: Annual

Standard abbreviations
- ISO 4: Natl. Libr. Wales J.

Indexing
- ISSN: 1758-2539

Links
- Journal homepage

The National Library of Wales Journal (Cylchgrawn Llyfrgell Genedlaethol Cymru) is an annual academic journal containing scholarly articles on historical topics relating to the Library's collections, covering Welsh medieval and local history, literature, and the Welsh diaspora. It was first published in 1939. Its last printed issue was published in 2006, and it is now an electronic publication.

It is being digitised by the Welsh Journals Online project at the National Library of Wales.
