= Glamorgan Monmouth and Brecon Gazette and Merthyr Guardian =

- Y gwir yn erbyn y byd
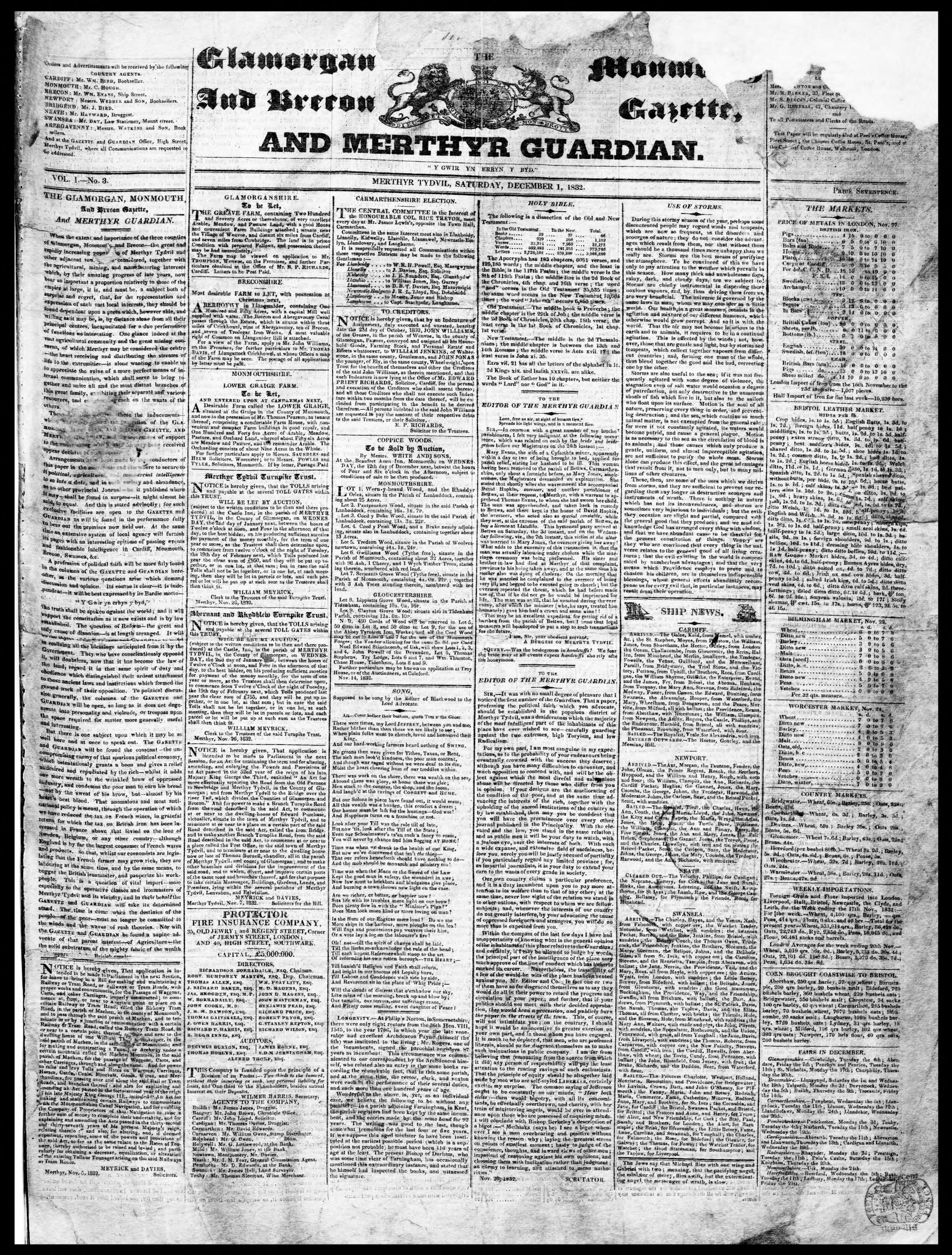
- Type: weekly newspaper
- Publisher: William Mallalieu
- Launched: 17 November 1832
- Relaunched: Glamorgan, Monmouth & Brecon gazette, Cardiff advertiser, and Merthyr guardian
- City: Merthyr Tydfil
- Country: Wales
- OCLC number: 751657426

The Glamorgan Monmouth and Brecon Gazette and Merthyr Guardian was a weekly English-language local newspaper that circulated in Breconshire, Glamorganshire, and Monmouthshire.

Welsh Newspapers Online has digitised 493 issues of the Glamorgan Monmouth and Brecon Gazette and Merthyr Guardian (1832-1843) from the newspaper holdings of the National Library of Wales.
