= Y Cofiadur =

Welsh language publication

Y Cofiadur is published by Cymdeithas Hanes Annibynwyr Cymru, a society founded in 1920 by Undeb yr Annibynwyr Cymraeg (English: Union of Welsh Independents). The first issue was published in 1923. It is an annual Welsh-language magazine on the history of religion and contains articles on the history of Welsh Independent churches and the individuals involved, with references. It also includes society notes. The magazine has been digitised by the Welsh Journals Online project at the National Library of Wales.
