= The Brecon Reporter =

Weekly newspaper

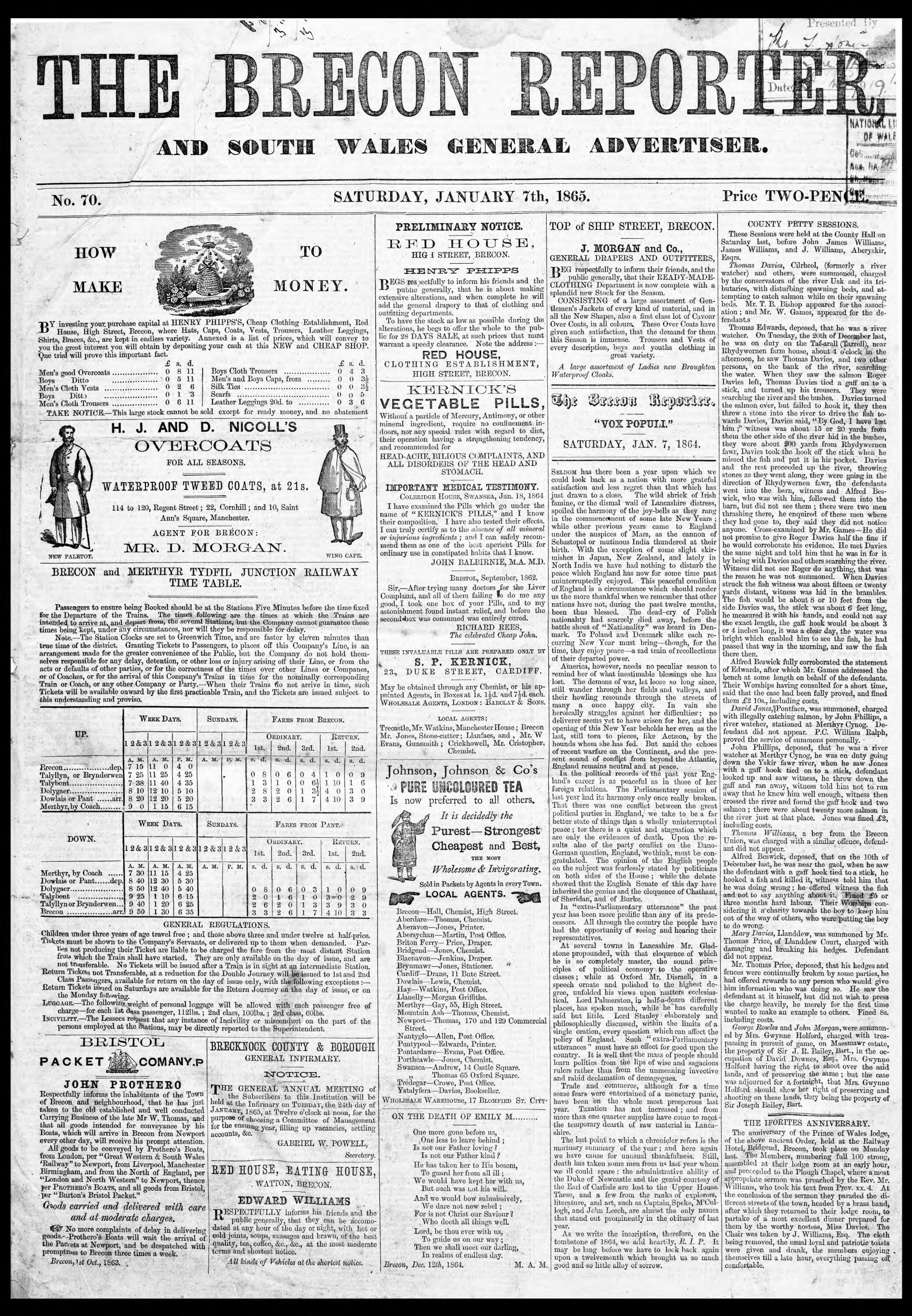
- Type: weekly newspaper
- City: Brecon
- OCLC number: 751653021

The Brecon Reporter was a weekly newspaper, published mainly in English, which circulated through South Wales and Brecknock, from January 1865 through November 1866.

Welsh Newspapers Online has digitised 140 issues of the Brecon Reporter from the newspaper holdings of the National Library of Wales.
