= Y Gwyddonydd =

Y Gwyddonydd ("The Scientist") was a Welsh-language magazine containing articles, reviews, and news items on scientific topics. It was published between 1963 and 1996 by the University of Wales Press.

The magazine has been digitized by the Welsh Journals Online project at the National Library of Wales.
