= Potter's Electric News =

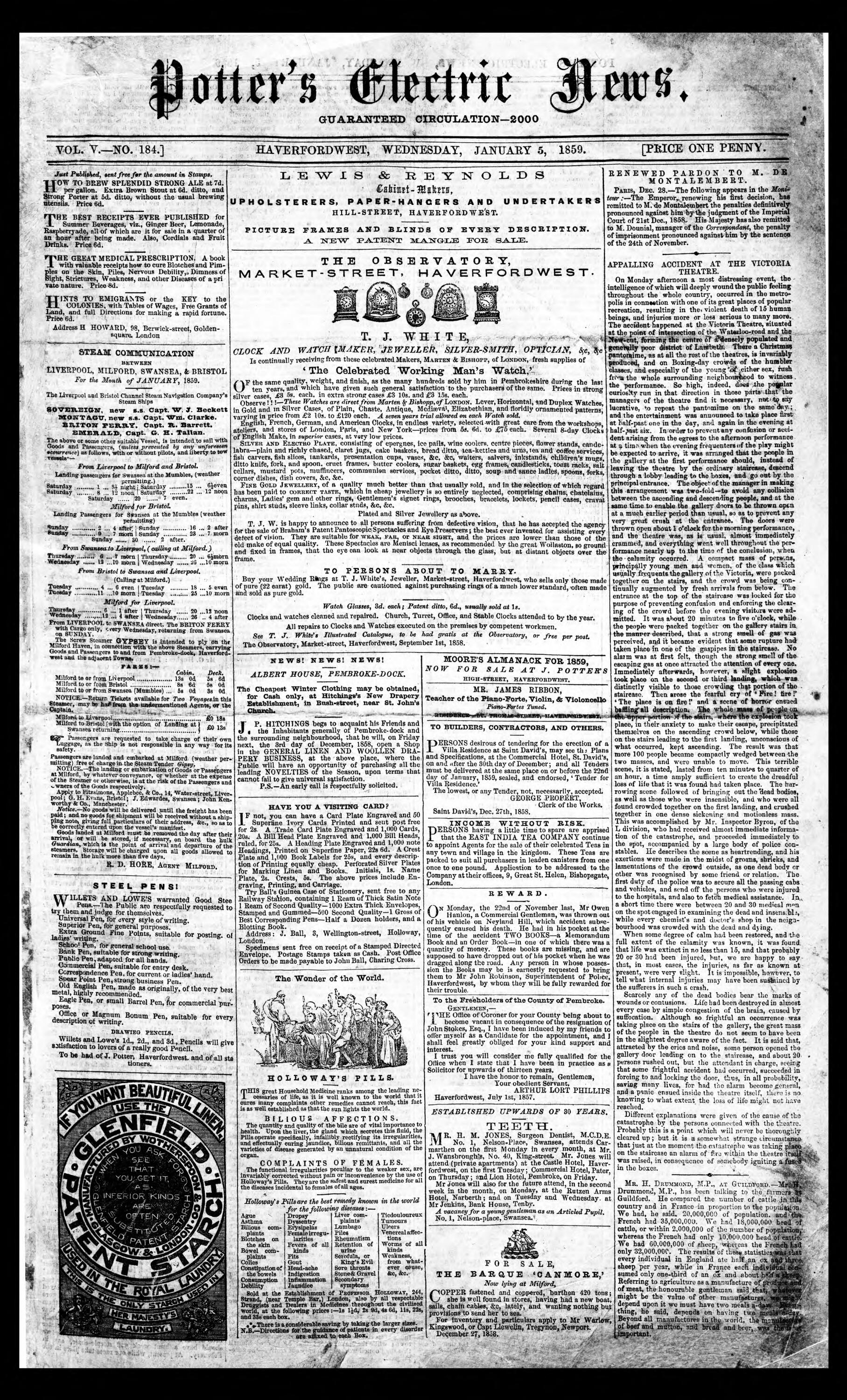
- Type: weekly newspaper
- Publisher: Joseph Potter
- Editor: Joseph Potter[*]
- Launched: 20 June 1855
- City: Haverfordwest
- Country: Wales
- OCLC number: 751653878

Potter's Electric News (published by Joseph Potter) was a weekly English language newspaper distributed in districts of South Wales (Haverfordwest, Fishguard, Begelly, Milford Haven and Tenby). It contained local, national and international news, and information. It was a very popular paper for a time, and at its peak had a weekly circulation of 2,000. Associated titles: Pembrokeshire Herald and General Advertiser.
