= The Rhyl Advertiser =

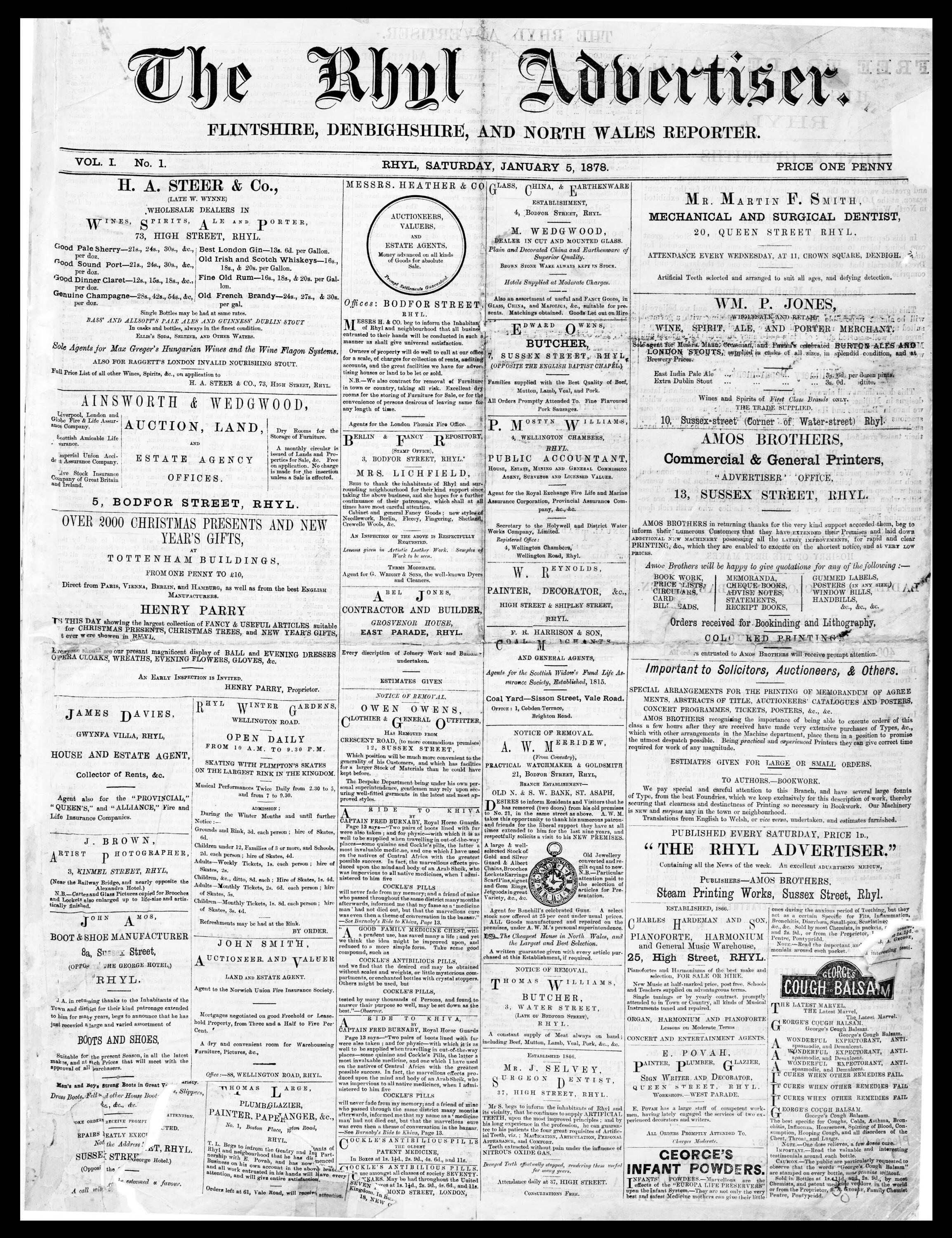
The Rhyl Advertiser Jan 5 1878

The Rhyl Advertiser (published between 1878 and 1893) was a weekly English language newspaper.

It was distributed throughout the Flintshire and Denbighshire areas in Wales. Associated titles: Rhyl Record and Advertiser (1886–1902, 1911–1917); Record and Advertiser (1902–1911).
