= Media of Wales =

Overview of mass media in Wales

The media in Wales provide services in both English and Welsh, and play a role in modern Welsh culture. BBC Cymru Wales began broadcasting in 1923 have helped to promote a form of standardised spoken Welsh, and one historian has argued that the concept of Wales as a single national entity owes much to modern broadcasting. The national broadcasters are based in the capital, Cardiff.

== Newspapers and news magazines ==
=== History of newspapers in Wales ===
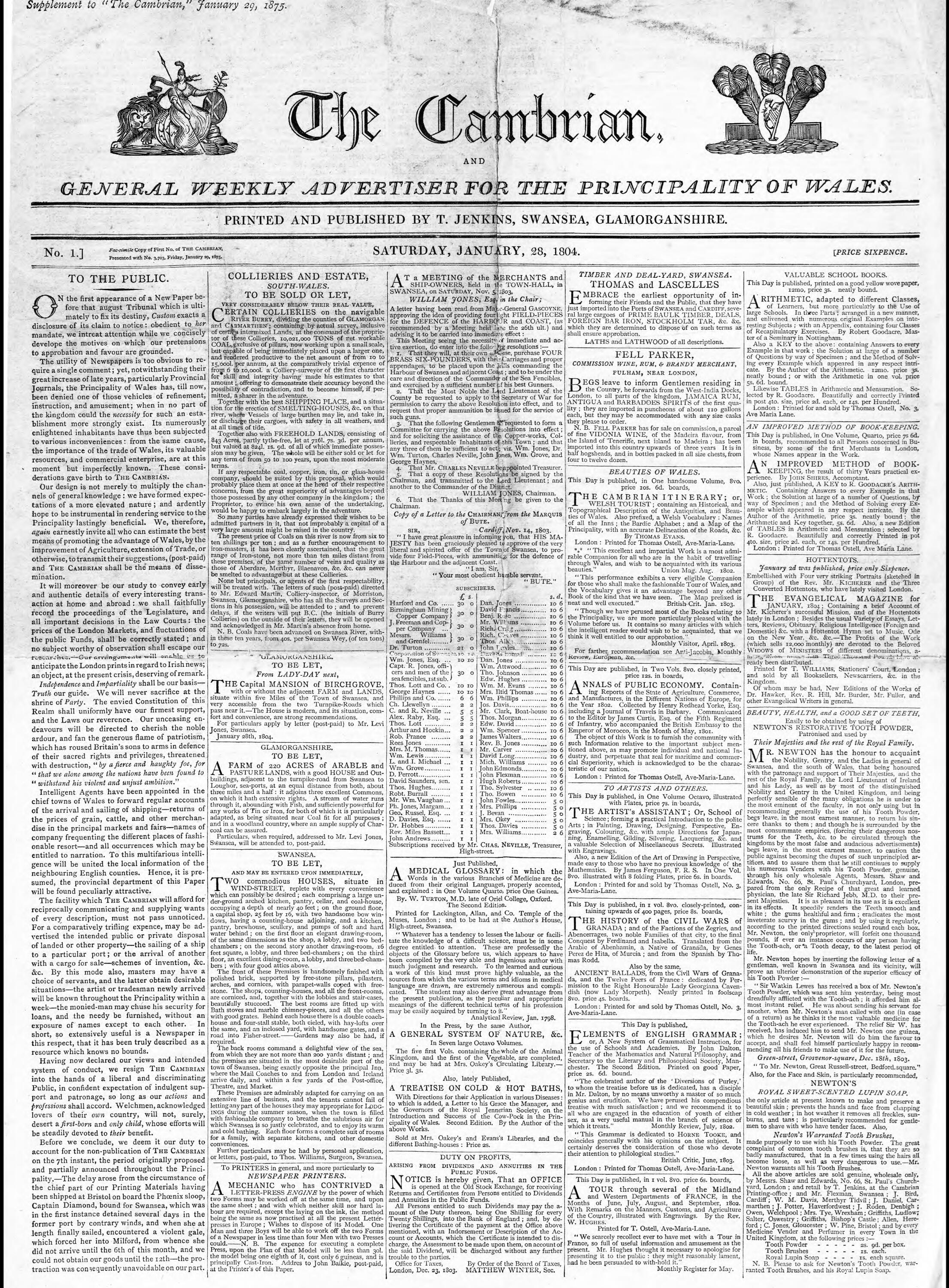
An 1804 front page of Wales' first weekly newspaper, The Cambrian.

The initial growth of newspaper publishing in Wales was slow in comparison to that of urban England, mainly due to distribution problems caused by poor transport networks and in particular rail links. It was further hindered by taxes on paper, advertising and the newspapers themselves. This changed in the early 19th century when Wales experienced sweeping social changes due to the Industrial Revolution. A rapid surge in population growth, along with the adoption of radacalist political views and the growth of Nonconformity saw the development of newspaper publishing in Wales. However the market for newspapers in Wales was much smaller than in England and was also to some extent split between two languages.

The first weekly newspaper in Wales was The Cambrian, published in 1804 and based in Swansea. Printed only in the English language, it was initially restricted to circulation in the southern towns of Wales, but over time its distribution increased, reaching not just South Wales, but also the West of England, America, India and the British colonies. The newspaper mainly covered local and general news, but also advocated mining, agricultural, and commercial interests. The success of The Cambrian was followed by other weeklies, including the North Wales Gazette (Bangor, 1808) and the Carmarthen Journal (Carmarthen, 1910). The first Welsh-language weekly, Seren Gomer, was founded by Joseph Harris (Gomer) in Swansea in 1814. It covered national, foreign, political and religious news, and also included literary contributions from notable Welsh Nonconformists. Although it had a considerable circulation, the tax on paper made the Seren Gomer unviable, and it stopped after 85 issues. It was relaunched as a fortnightly in 1818 and then a monthly in 1820.

Few newspapers were established in Wales in the 1820s and 1830s. Both the Cardiff Weekly Reporter and the Newport Review were launched in Cardiff in 1822, and in 1836 the Welsh-language weekly Cronicl yr Oes (The Chronicle of the Age) began distributing from Mold in North Wales. 1836 also saw the printing of a West Wales paper, the Cambrian Gazette: Y Freinlen Gymroaidd ("The Welshmen's Charter"), based in Aberystwyth. All four were short lived. More successful papers from that period included the Monmouthshire Merlin (Newport, 1829–91) and The Welshman (1832-1984). In 1843, Yr Amserau (The Times), which was to become the first successful Welsh-language newspaper, was launched. Established across the border in Liverpool by Gwilym Hiraethog, it was later bought by Thomas Gee of Denbigh in 1859 and amalgamated with Baner Cymru (The Banner of Wales) (1857) to form Baner ac Amserau Cymru. This became a powerful influence on Welsh life, and through its most notable contributor John Griffith, writing under his pen name Y Gohebydd (The Correspondent), the paper would champion radical causes, including the defence of Nonconformist views. In Wrexham, two monthly newspapers were established in 1848, the Wrexham Recorder and the Wrexham Registrar, although both shut down the following year. In 1854 George Bayley established the Wrexham Advertiser, a weekly newspaper that remained active for several decades.

When stamp duty on newspapers was abolished in 1855, the effect was a rise in the number of publications, and most of the denominational papers in Wales originated around this period. The Baptist Seren Cymru (Star of Wales) launched in Carmarthen 1851, but had a short run followed by a more successful launch when it re-established in 1856. This was followed by the Congregationalists' Y Tyst Cymreig (The Welsh Witness) (1867), the Calvinistic Methodists' Y Goleuad (The Illuminator) (1869), the Wesleyans' Y Gwyliedydd (The Sentinel) (1877) and the Anglican Y Llan a'r Dywysogaeth (The Parish and Principality) (1881). These religious papers were published nationally and reported on home and wider British news, though they also gave leadership on political and social issues.

Outside of Cardiff and Swansea, two other towns in the south Wales, Merthyr Tydfil and Aberdare, developed as newspaper publishing hubs in the mid- to late 19th century. Josiah Thomas Jones of Aberdare launched both Y Gwron Cymreig ("The Welsh Hero", 1854–60) and The Aberdare Times (1861-1902), while David Williams (Alaw Goch), Abraham Mason and William Williams (Carw Goch) also of Aberdare, published Y Gwladgarwr ("The Patriot", 1858–82). The most important of these newspapers was Tarian y Gweithiwr ("The Workers' Shield"), which had a strong Liberal-Labour bias and stood for workers' rights; this made it popular with the coal miners and tinplate workers of the region. Merthyr Tydfil in turn was home to The Cardiff and Merthyr Guardian (1832–74), The Merthyr Star (1859-1881), Y Fellten ("The Lightning Flash", 1868–76), and two Chartist publications The Workman and Udgorn Cymru ("The Trumpet of Wales").

In the north, Bangor and Caernarfon rose as important print towns. The North Wales Gazette was first published in Bangor in 1808 before changing title to the North Wales Chronicle in 1827. In direct conflict was the Carnarvon and Denbigh Herald, whose editorials were Liberal and Nonconformist, in contrast with the support of the Chronicle for Toryism and the Established Church.

=== Modern national newspapers ===
Unlike Scotland and Northern Ireland, the Welsh national press is limited. The only English-language Wales-based national newspapers are the Western Mail, produced by Reach plc and The National produced by Newsquest. The Western Mail's Sunday counterpart is the Wales on Sunday.

Circulation rank for Welsh published national newspapers, 2012-2019
Rank	Newspaper	Circulation (2019)
1	The Western Mail	12,000

One study in the 1990s found that the most widely read newspaper in Wales was The Sun. Despite the popularity of London-based newspapers in Wales, most UK newspapers do not produce regional editions for the Welsh audience, although until 2003 The Mirror was branded as the Welsh Mirror. Since the 1970s, there has been a decline in the number of Fleet Street newspaper journalists based in Wales; now all national UK newspapers rely on the Press Association reporter in Wales.

=== Modern regional newspapers ===
==== Daily newspapers ====
The most popular local newspapers in Wales, as of 2018, are the Daily Post, the Swansea-based South Wales Evening Post, the Cardiff-based South Wales Echo and Western Mail, and the Newport-based South Wales Argus. The North Wales edition of the Liverpool Daily Post is distributed in that region. The Evening Leader is the main evening newspaper for North East Wales.

Circulation rank for Welsh daily newspapers, 2024
Rank	Newspaper	Circulation (2019)	Region population	Reach percentage
1	Daily Post	8350	687,937	1.21%
2	South Wales Evening Post	5471	573,600	0.95%
3	The Western Mail	5271	1,481,570	0.35%
4	South Wales Echo	4574	1,481,570	0.3%
5	South Wales Argus	3623	337,400	1.07%

==== Weekly newspapers ====
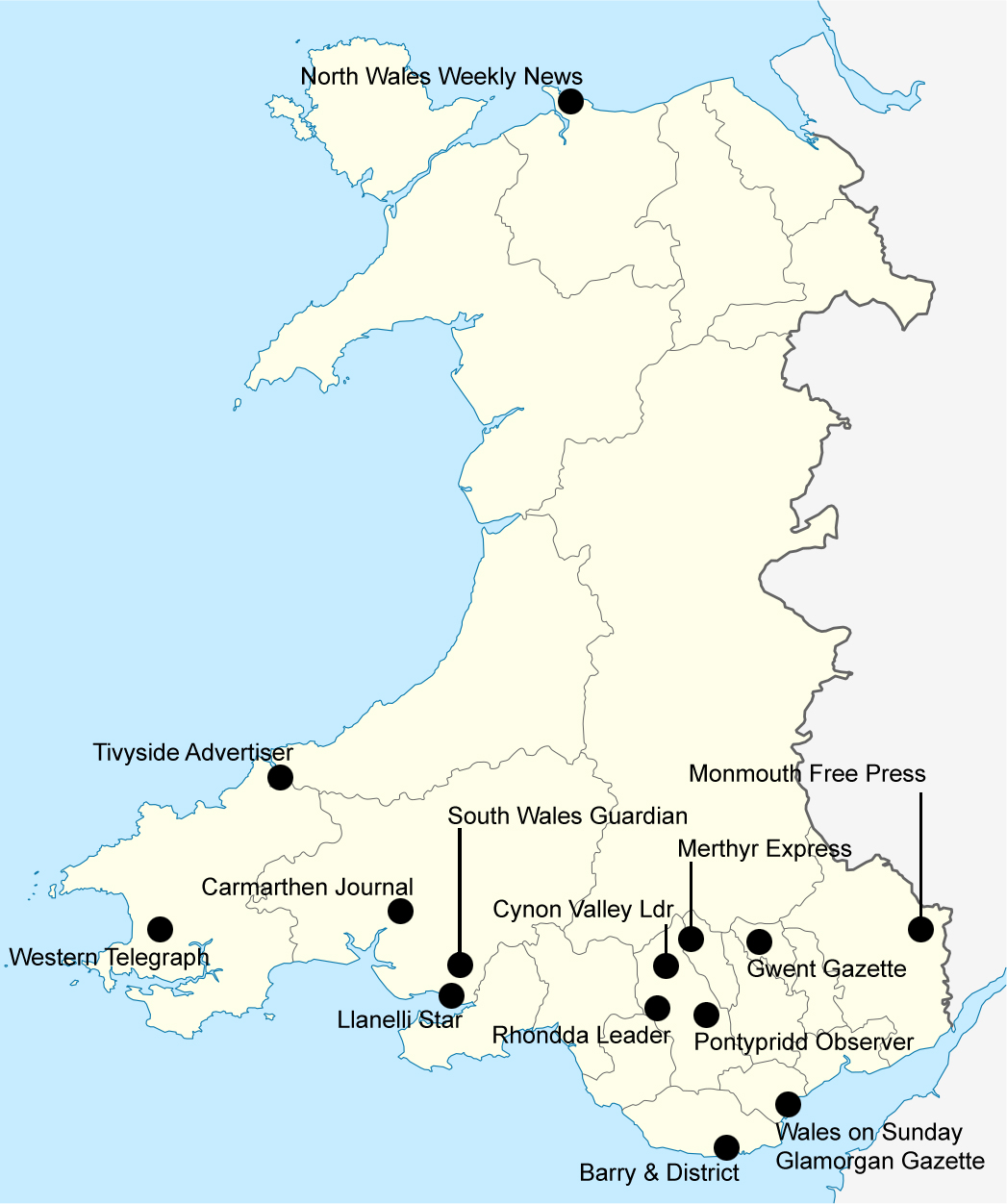
Locations of Welsh weekly newspapers, highlighted over a map of the country

Y Cymro ("The Welshman", Welsh pronunciation: [ə ˈkəmrɔ]) was Wales' last Welsh language weekly newspaper, first published in 1932. By the time of its cessation in 2017 its sales had dwindled to around 2,000 copies. It now shares content through social media and has applied for funding from the Welsh Books Council for the resumption of physical publication.

Circulation rank for Welsh weekly newspapers, 2012-2019
Rank	Newspaper
1	Western Telegraph
2	Wales on Sunday
3	Carmarthen Journal
4	Llanelli Star
5	Glamorgan Gazette
6	Tivyside Advertiser
7	Cynon Valley Leader
8	North Wales Weekly News
9	South Wales Guardian
10	Monmouth Free Press
11	Caernarfon & Denbigh Herald
12	Barry & District
13	Merthyr Express
14	Rhondda Leader
15	Pontypridd Observer
16	Gwent Gazette
17	Abergavenny Chronicle

=== Literature ===
==== Publishers ====
There are a number of large, medium, and small-sized publishing houses across Wales; however, the industry has seen contraction in recent years. The Wales Books Council states that there are 109 publishers in Wales. Funding for literature in Wales is dominated by the Welsh Books Council in Cardiff and Literature Wales in Aberystwyth.

- Gomer Press is the largest and oldest publisher of English and Welsh language books in Wales, established in 1892. It is based in Llandysul and publishes around 120 titles a year. In September 2019 it was announced Gomer would be closing their publishing arm to focus on printing. Its 55 employees will be retained but will no longer publish new titles, of which it produced 36 in 2018. It marked the end of 127 years of publishing.
- Publish & Print is a publisher based in Pontypridd, founded in 2014 by the Welsh writer Dave Lewis.
- Accent Press is a publisher based in Mountain Ash and Cardiff, founded in 2003 by Hazel Cushion.
- Parthian Books are Cardigan-based publishers, established in 1994 by Richard Lewis Davies and Gillian Griffiths.
- Seren is a Bridgend-based independent publisher, established in 1988. They are a subsidiary of Poetry Wales Press Ltd.
- Dref Wen is a Cardiff-based publisher, established in 1998, specialising in children's books written in both English and Welsh.
- Welsh Academic Press is a publishing house established in 1994 focused on historical and political non-fiction. Their imprint St David's Press focuses on leisure, sport, and history.
- Crown House Publishing is a Carmarthen-based publishing company established in 1998. It specialises in literature about education, coaching, NLP, hypnosis, self-help and personal development
- Graffeg is a publisher founded in 2003 by Peter Gill specialising in illustrated children's and non-fiction books.
- Deadstar Publishing is a graphic novel publisher based in Cardiff and established in 2011.
- University of Wales Press was established in 1922 and publishes 50 to 70 new titles each year. Their work focuses on the humanities, arts, and social sciences.

==== Modern magazines ====
Around Town is a free lifestyle and events magazine which publishes four variant editions that serve Bridgend, Cardiff, Swansea and Rhondda Cynon Taff.

Golwg ("View"; Welsh pronunciation: [ˈɡɔlʊk]) is a Welsh-language magazine established in 1988. It covers current events and features and claims a monthly circulation of 12,000, the largest circulation of any magazine in Wales.

Cambria, which referred to itself as the 'National Magazine of Wales', was first launched in 1997 and was published bi-monthly. A glossy publication covering the arts, current affairs, topical subjects, history and lifestyle, it was aimed at ABC1 readers. It faced closure in 2015 after losing its funding from the Welsh Books Council, but was temporarily saved after a newly formed company, MegaGroup Newspapers, bought a half share in the publication. It printed its final issue in 2016 and MegaGroup was made insolvent in 2017.

Planet, a bi-monthly magazine covering the arts, literature and politics in Wales and the wider world, is produced in Aberystwyth. Each edition features poems and short stories alongside cultural reviews and political analysis.

A Welsh edition of the Times Educational Supplement, called TES Cymru, dedicates a number of pages to Wales' devolved education system, with a reporter based in Cardiff.

South Wales Media Ltd produces local community magazines in the Swansea and Neath Port Talbot counties: The Ponty Mag, which covers Pontardawe, Clydach Mag covering Clydach, Swansea East Mag, and SA4 Magazine. It also produces Swansea City FC fanzine Jack Swan magazine.

Furthermore, Wales has a network of local Welsh-language newsletters. Known as papurau bro ("local papers"), they are produced by volunteers and generally published monthly, serving a hyperlocal market. The first such publication was Y Dinesydd ("The Citizen"), established in Cardiff in April 1973. There are currently over 50 papurau bro, produced throughout Wales.

==== Zines ====
There are a large number of specialist zines produced in Wales, including Gagged! (the South Wales anarchist newsletter), The Free Flyer (the free paper for "Brecon, Builth, Crickhowell, Hay on Wye, Llandovery, Llandrindod, Llanwrtyd, Talgarth and Rhayader"), and the Cambrian Snooze newsletter in Aberystwyth.

=== Digital ===
For 2019–20 the Welsh Government has allocated a £200,000 budget to stimulate and continue digital and hyperlocal journalism in Wales.

Golwg360

In 2009, Golwg launched Golwg360, a news website offering daily Welsh and international news in the Welsh language. It was initially launched with £600,000 funding from the Welsh Government, and is currently funded through the Welsh Books Council.

Senedd Home

Blogger Owen Donovan operates an extensive network of blogs covering a range of hyperlocal and national events. Three blogs are published, namely Senedd Home (reporting on business of the Senedd and Welsh Government), State of Wales (a pro-independence blog about Welsh national issues and developments), and Oggy Bloggy Ogwr, which reports on Local Authority matters in Wales.

Nation.Cymru

Nation.Cymru is a national English language news service established in 2017 by Bangor University journalism lecturer and former Golwg editor Ifan Morgan Jones, alongside its current CEO Mark Mansfield. The service states it aims to address the absence of a national print media in Wales, and provide pan-Wales reporting to better inform Welsh people, particularly about politics, the Welsh Parliament (Senedd), and the functioning of the devolved Government. It has an agreement with Owen Donovan of Senedd Home to report on stories related to Welsh parliamentary business.

News from Wales

Newsfromwales.co.uk is another national online English language business and community news service established in 2017 by local journalist and writer Lisa Baker. The site was formed to help Welsh SMEs and local charities in Wales get their news out there, although the site also covers local events and community news. The site was named Best Online News Platform - Wales 2021 in the SME News UK Enterprise Awards 2021 and Best National Community & Business News Platform in the SME News UK Enterprise Awards 2024.

Sports media

Other websites in the sphere include sports pages Dai Sport and Y Clwb Pel Droed.

Business media and hyperlocal reporting

Business news is dominated in Wales by Business News Wales, and hyperlocal sites operate such as Carmarthenshire News Online, Caerphilly Observer, Wrexham.com, Deeside.com, Cwmbran Life, The Bangor Aye, We Are Cardiff, Cardiff Directory Wales, and My Cardiff North.

== Broadcasting ==
=== History ===
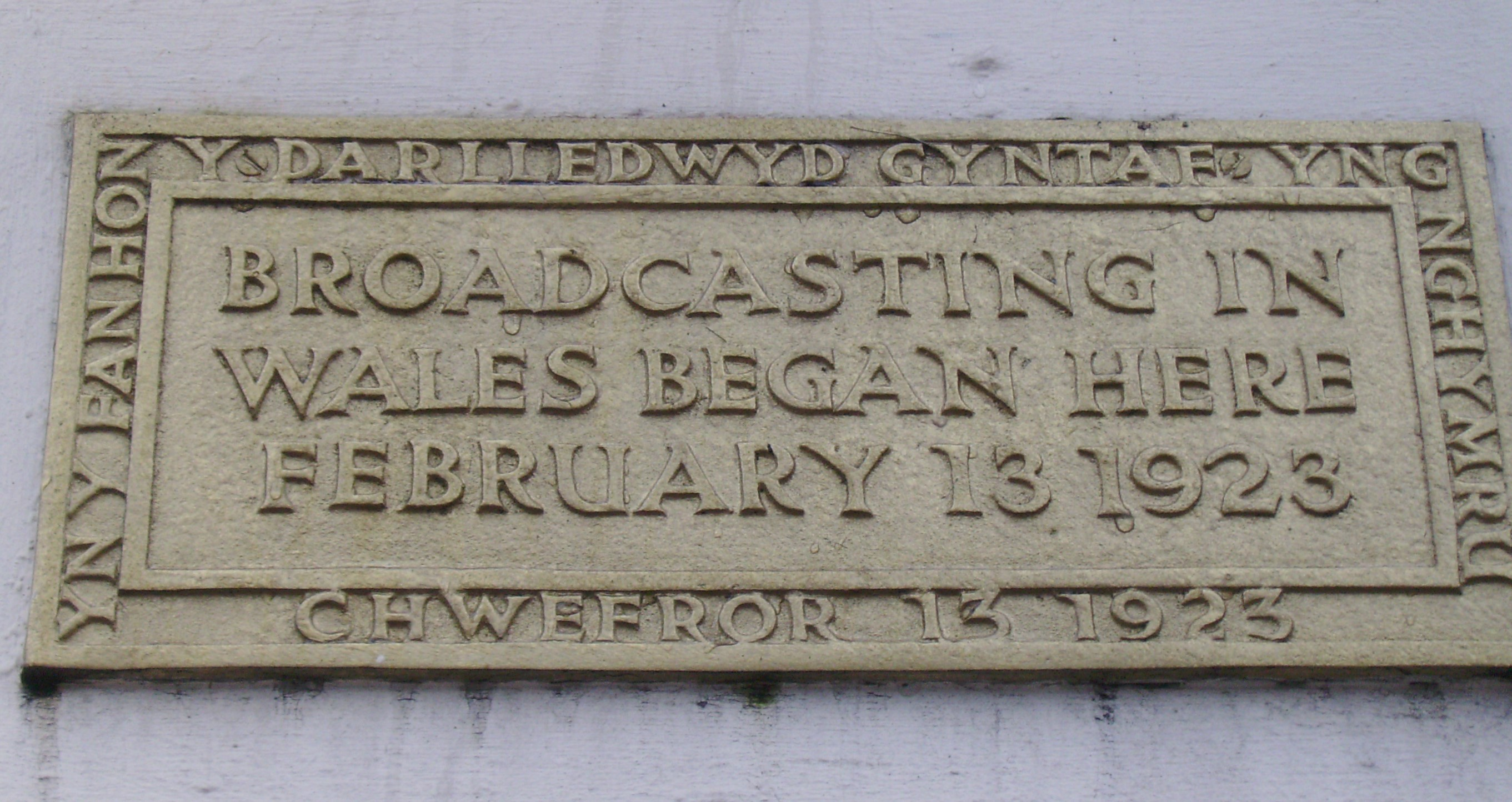
Plaque commemorating the first broadcast in Wales on 13 February 1923

At 5 pm on 13 February 1923, 5WA Cardiff, a forerunner of BBC Radio Wales, first broadcast from a music shop at 19 Castle Street in Cardiff city centre. Later that evening Mostyn Thomas sang Dafydd y Garreg Wen, which was the first Welsh language song to be broadcast. A commemorative plaque records the event. However 5WA Cardiff ended on 28 May 1923.

=== Television ===
==== Public service television broadcasting ====
BBC Cymru Wales is based in New Broadcasting House, Central Square, Cardiff, and provides BBC One Wales and BBC Two Wales television channels. BBC Wales produces the most-watched Welsh news programme BBC Wales Today, current affairs programme Week In Week Out, sports coverage in Scrum V and Sport Wales, science-fiction programmes including Doctor Who and Torchwood, and factual programmes such as X-Ray.

S4C is the main Welsh-language station and has its headquarters in Llanishen, northern Cardiff. The channel features around 10 hours a week of programmes made in Welsh by BBC Cymru Wales, such as Newyddion S4C (S4C News) and Pobol y Cwm (People of the Valley; a long-running soap opera) as well as programmes made by independent production companies.

==== Commercial television broadcasting ====
ITV Cymru Wales is based in Culverhouse Cross, western Cardiff and produces regional news and factual programmes such as Wales at Six, Wales This Week, Sharp End and The Wales Show.

In 2012, the Chancellor George Osborne invited new local television licence bids in order to establish stations akin to American decentralized affiliate broadcasters. Since its introduction, there have been two dominant companies that operate the majority of local licenses in the UK, specifically Local Television Limited, who run Cardiff TV and North Wales TV, and That's TV, who run the That's Swansea Bay station.

=== Radio ===
==== Public service radio broadcasting ====
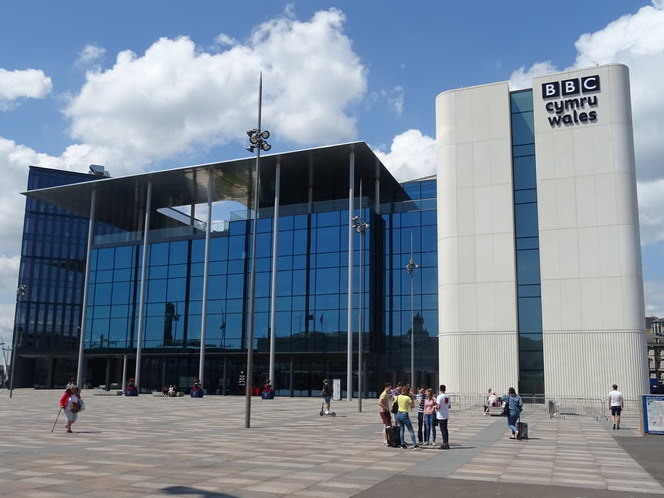
BBC Cymru Wales New Broadcasting House

The BBC runs two national radio stations, BBC Radio Wales in English and BBC Radio Cymru and its spin-off in Welsh. A third national service is provided by Heart in South Wales and North and Mid Wales. There are also a number of commercial and community radio stations throughout the country which broadcast in both Welsh and English.

==== Commercial radio broadcasting ====
In 2019, UK radio conglomerate Global Plc cut a significant amount of its local programing across the UK, specifically stations branded as Capital, Smooth, and Heart, as well as those produced under license for Communicorp (owner of the Capital South Wales brand).

The result is that a majority of content on five of the top ten Welsh radio stations is now produced in London, with the exception of Capital Cymru who retained local programming in order to meet their Welsh language obligations.

Name of conglomerate	Number of stations owned
Nation Broadcasting	7
Communicorp	2 (with 4 regional outputs)
Bauer Media Group	2

The industry monitor Rajar has recorded a subsequent fall in listenership of these deregulated stations, and an increase in listenership for Capital's commercial competitors, including Nation Radio and Dragon Radio Wales.

Rank	Radio station	Broadcast office location	Weekly reach (Q2 2019)	Reach change (Q2 on Q1 2019)
1	Heart South Wales	Global Studios, London	394,000	
2	BBC Radio Wales	New Broadcasting House, Cardiff	365,000	
3	Capital South Wales	Communicorp Studios, London	231,000	
4	Nation Radio Wales	Cardiff (Bay)	145,000	
5	Capital North West and Wales	Wrexham	140,000	
6	Hits Radio South Wales	Swansea	115,000	
7	BBC Radio Cymru	New Broadcasting House, Cardiff	112,000	
8	Heart North and Mid Wales	Global Studios, London	108,000	
9	Smooth Wales	Global Studios, London	81,000	
10	Smooth North Wales	Global Studios, London	67,000	
11	Dragon Radio Wales	Cardiff	49,000	
13	Greatest Hits Radio South Wales	Swansea	40,000	
14	Radio Pembrokeshire	St Hilary	35,000	
15	Radio Carmarthenshire	St Hilary	30,000	No change
16	Bridge FM	Bridgend	22,000	
17	Easy Radio	Swansea Bay	21,000	
18	Nation Radio Wales (Radio Ceredigion)	St Hilary	14,000	

== See also ==
- BBC Wales Drama Village
- Mass media
- Media in Cardiff
- Media Wales

== Sources ==
=== Primary sources ===
- Davies, John (1994). Broadcasting and the BBC in Wales. Cardiff: University of Wales Press. ISBN 0-7083-1273-X.
- Davies, John; Jenkins, Nigel; Menna, Baines; Lynch, Peredur I., eds. (2008). The Welsh Academy Encyclopaedia of Wales. Cardiff: University of Wales Press. ISBN 978-0-7083-1953-6.
- Medhurst, Jamie (2010). A History of Independent Television in Wales. Cardiff: University of Wales Press. ISBN 978-0-7083-2308-3.
- Read all about it, Inquiry into News Journalism in Wales (PDF) (Report). Cardiff: National Assembly of Wales: Welsh Language and Communications Committee. May 2018.
