= Wrexhamite =

Welsh newspaper

The Wrexhamite was a weekly newspaper from Wrexham, a town in northern Wales. It was the second weekly newspaper published in Wrexham. Lisa Peters comments that the Wrexhamite showed that it was possible to establish a Conservative-supporting newspaper in north Wales and that Wrexham could support two weekly newspapers. The first issue was published on in January 1855 and in January 1857 its name was changed to the Wrexham Telegraph. It continued under that title until ceasing publication in 1867 possibly due to serious financial problems, although no explanation was ever provided by the newspaper itself.

According to an advertisement in the Wrexham Albion, the first issue of the Wrexhamite was due to be published on 1 November 1854. However it did not appear until 11 January 1855. It cost two pence. A.H. Dodd acknowledges that it was established to oppose the pro-Nonconformist and pro-Liberal Wrexham Advertiser and, as such, "brought political diversity to Wrexham's press market". In its first issue, it may have been referring to medical advertising when it stated that it would decline advertisements of an "exceptional nature". In December 1855 the newspaper announced that it would change from a four page broadsheet to a small sixteen-page folio, change its publication day to Friday, appoint a new editor who was described as "a gentleman connected with the London daily press", and the general articles and news would be prepared in London. However, a year later, it reverted to being a broadsheet and moved its publication day back to Thursday.

It survived for twelve years although its frequent changes in ownership points to a lack of stability and financial problems. Despite its initial reluctance to include medical advertising, by 1865, the newspaper had an average of nine medical advertisements per issue, despite medical advertisements having a reputation of quackery amongst the press.

== Ownership ==
The name of the first proprietor was not provided, although Mitchell's Press Directory named James Lindop, the newspaper's printer and publisher as the owner. However, the Wrexham Advertiser revealed that the owner was Wrexham solicitor John Lewis although the Wrexham Printers' Society stated that Lewis was just the principal of a private company which owned the newspaper. As Lisa Peters comments, John Lewis never explained why he attempted to hide his involvement with the Wrexhamite, although it may have been the case that it was not considered appropriate for a solicitor and aspiring political to be involved in the press. Lewis sold the Wrexhamite in April 1857 to the printer Railton Potter. Lewis later served as Conservative mayor of Wrexham in 1862 and 1863 and was convicted of theft and imprisoned in 1896.

By the end of 1858, Potter sold the newspaper to another printer, Charles Griffiths and in April 1863 he sold the newspaper to William Bellingham. Bellingham changed the day of publication to a Saturday, doubled the size from four to eight pages and changed the title to the Denbighshire and Flintshire Telegraph. From 1865 it produced three editions (Wednesday morning, Thursday morning - a special market edition for Wrexham only, and Saturday. Lisa Peters comments that this was the closest a Wrexham newspaper came to daily publication until the weekday Wrexham Evening Leader in 1973.

The last issue was published on 16 February 1867 with Bellingham declining to provide a reason for the closure merely saying that "the reasons for its discontinuance being of a private and personal nature need not be publicly explained".

== Premises ==
The Wrexhamite's original printing and publishing office was in Hope street but when it was sold in April 1857, it moved to High street. When Charles Griffiths purchased the newspaper, its offices moved to Bryn-y-Ffynnon and then Henblas Street in 1861 and High street in 1863. When William Bellingham purchased the newspaper, the offices moved to Lambpit Street and finally to Hope Chambers, Hope street in April 1866.

After the newspaper changed title to the Denbighshire and Flintshire Telegraph, three publishing establishments were set up in October 1863 in Mold, Oswestry, and Chester. The Oswestry and Chester publishing establishments closed in January 1865.

== Title changes ==
- 1855–1856 – Wrexhamite
- January–May 1857 – Wrexham Telegraph and Denbighshire and Flintshire Reporter with which is incorporated the Wrexhamite
- May 1857 – September 1863 – Wrexham Telegraph and Denbighshire and Flintshire Reporter
- April 1863 – The Denbighshire and Flintshire Telegraph, North Shropshire and West Cheshire Reporter

== Rivals ==
The Wrexhamite's main rival was the Liberal-supporting Wrexham Advertiser. Lisa Peters describes the two newspapers as "bitter rivals" whose rivalry culminated in two libel cases. It revealed the identity of the owner as John Lewis (see above) which led to the Advertiser being described as "personally assailing every one whose views were not in unison with its own." Eventually Lewis sued the owner of the Advertiser, George Bayley, for libel, requesting £100 but was awarded only £10. In July 1861 it published an anonymous letter which accused the Advertiser of being an "organised hypocrisy" which lacked the courage to express its own opinions due to its fear of losing readers and advertising.

== Circulation and distribution ==
July 1859 - over 1,000 copies

The Wrexhamite published agents listings between 1857 and 1863 which showed where the newspaper could be purchased. In 1857 it had agents in the towns of Denbigh, Ruthin, Holywell, and Chester but six years later, it only had fourteen agents. It did not have any agents in the mining villages near Wrexham and Lisa Peters comments that this could have been because its pro-Conservative stance would not have made it popular amongst working-class miners.

== Editors ==
- 1855– James Lindop
- 1856 – an unknown "gentleman connected with the London daily press"
- 1857 – Mr Williams
- 1858 – Charles Griffiths
- 1859 – Richard Richards, a journalist and poet from the Oswestry area who had previously worked for the North Wales Chronicle. Richards had previously also been employed on the Advertiser and after his dismissal from that newspaper, a letter from him was published in the Telegraph in which Richards argued that he had been the editor of the Advertiser and that his work consisted mainly of scissors and paste journalism.
- January 1863 – unknown
- April 1863 – William Bellingham
