= Gwalia (newspaper) =

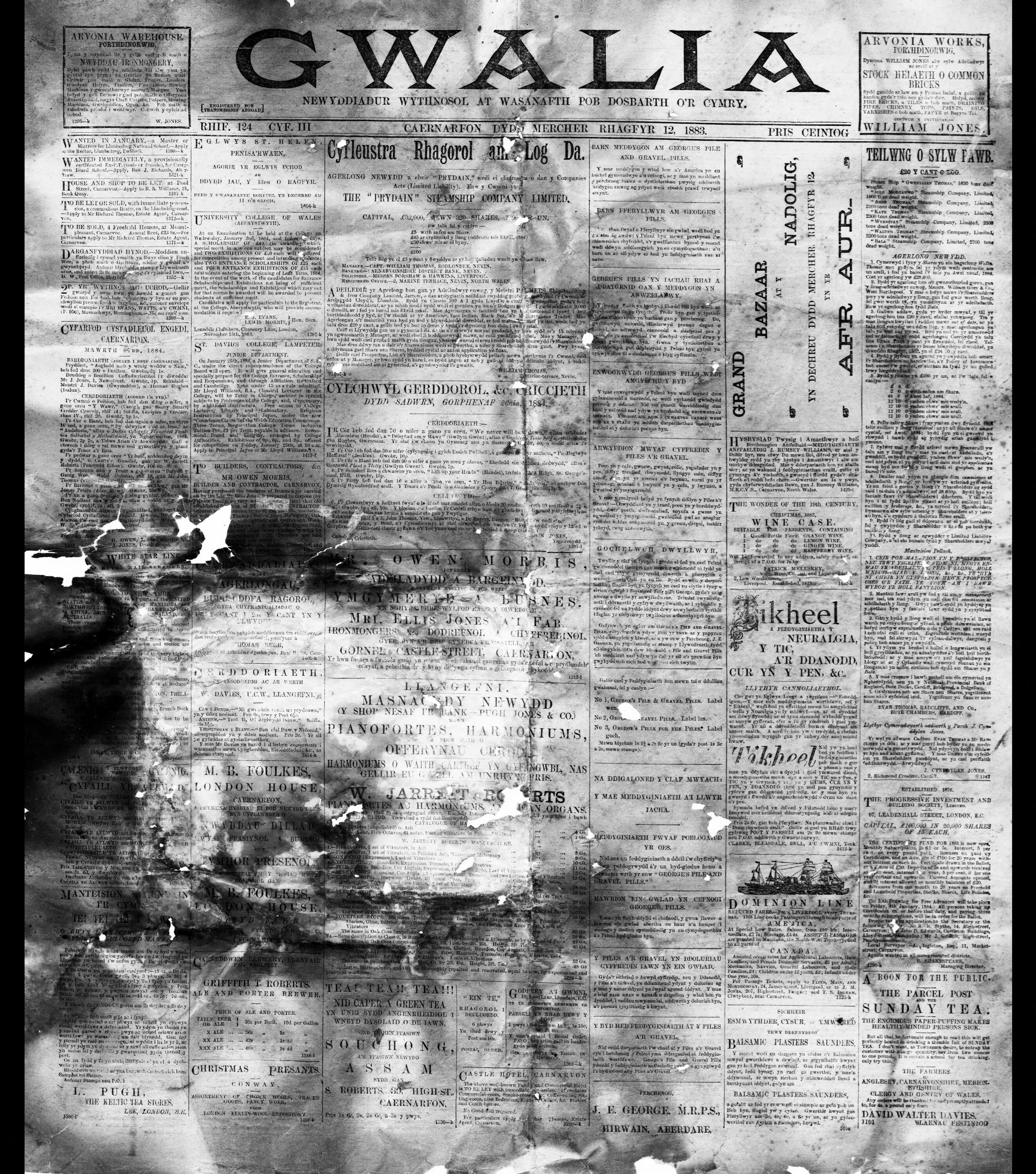
- Type: weekly newspaper
- City: Caernarfon
- OCLC number: 57310151

Gwalia was a weekly conservative Welsh language newspaper published by Robert Williams. It was distributed throughout Wales and also in Liverpool, Manchester, and London. It contained general political, social and religious news, and news of local interest such as eisteddfod events.

Welsh Newspapers Online has digitised 651 issues of Gwalia (1883-1910) from the newspaper holdings of the National Library of Wales.

Associated titles: Clorianydd a'r Gwalia (1921-1969); Clorianydd a'r Gwalia (1921-1969).
