= County Observer and Monmouthshire Central Advertiser =

English weekly newspaper

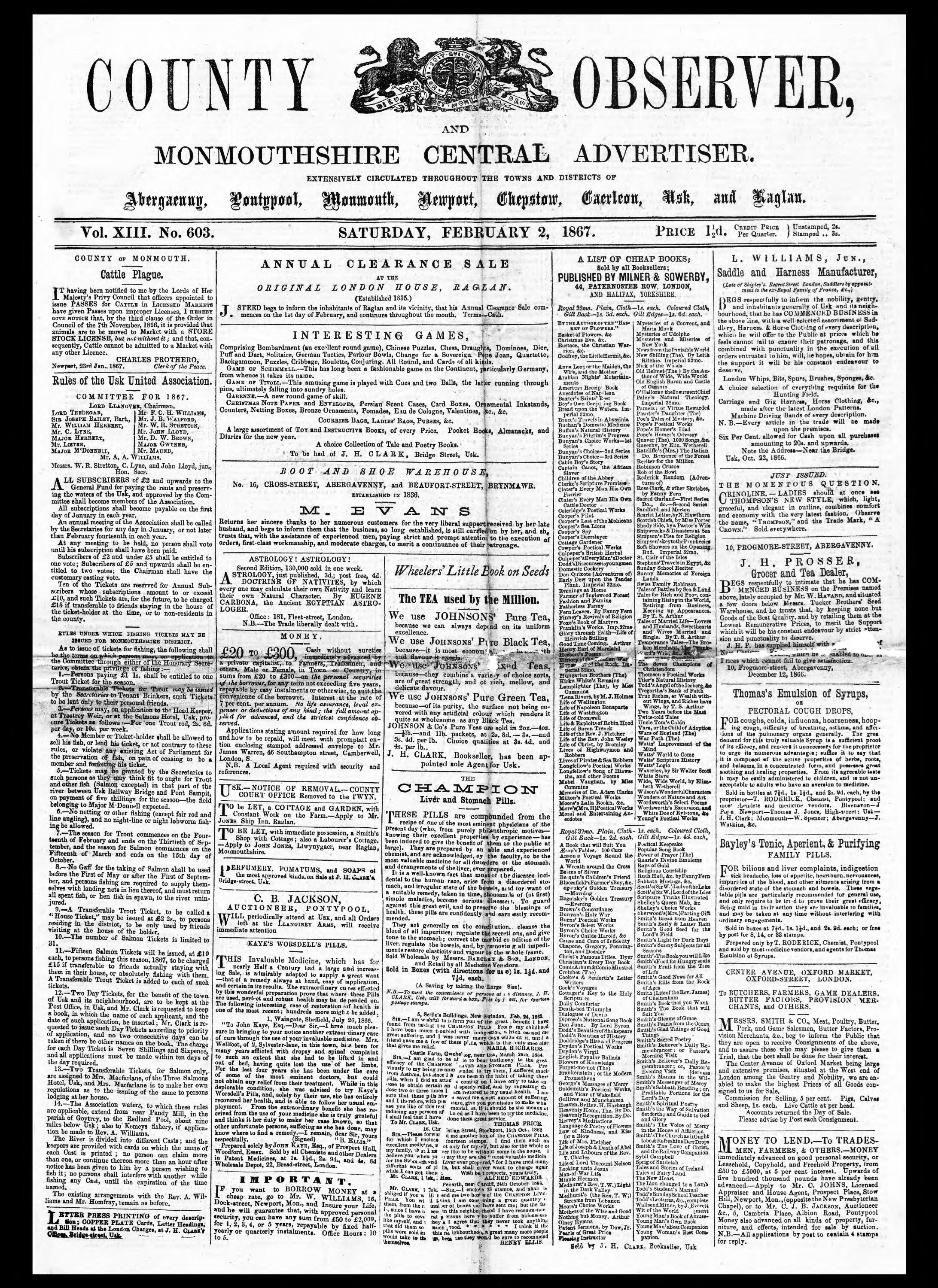
- Type: weekly newspaper
- OCLC number: 751673871

The County Observer and Monmouthshire Central Advertiser was a weekly English language newspaper with conservative editorial leanings that was published in Wales.

It was distributed in the Abergavenny, Raglan, Monmouth, Caerleon, Newport, Chepstow, Pontypool, and Usk regions, and mineral and agricultural districts. It contained articles covering local and district news, with an emphasis on agricultural issues.

Welsh Newspapers Online has digitised 1,095 issues of the County Observer and Monmouthshire Central Advertiser (1867–1908) from the newspaper holdings of the National Library of Wales.
