= The Cardigan Observer =

Newspaper published in Wales

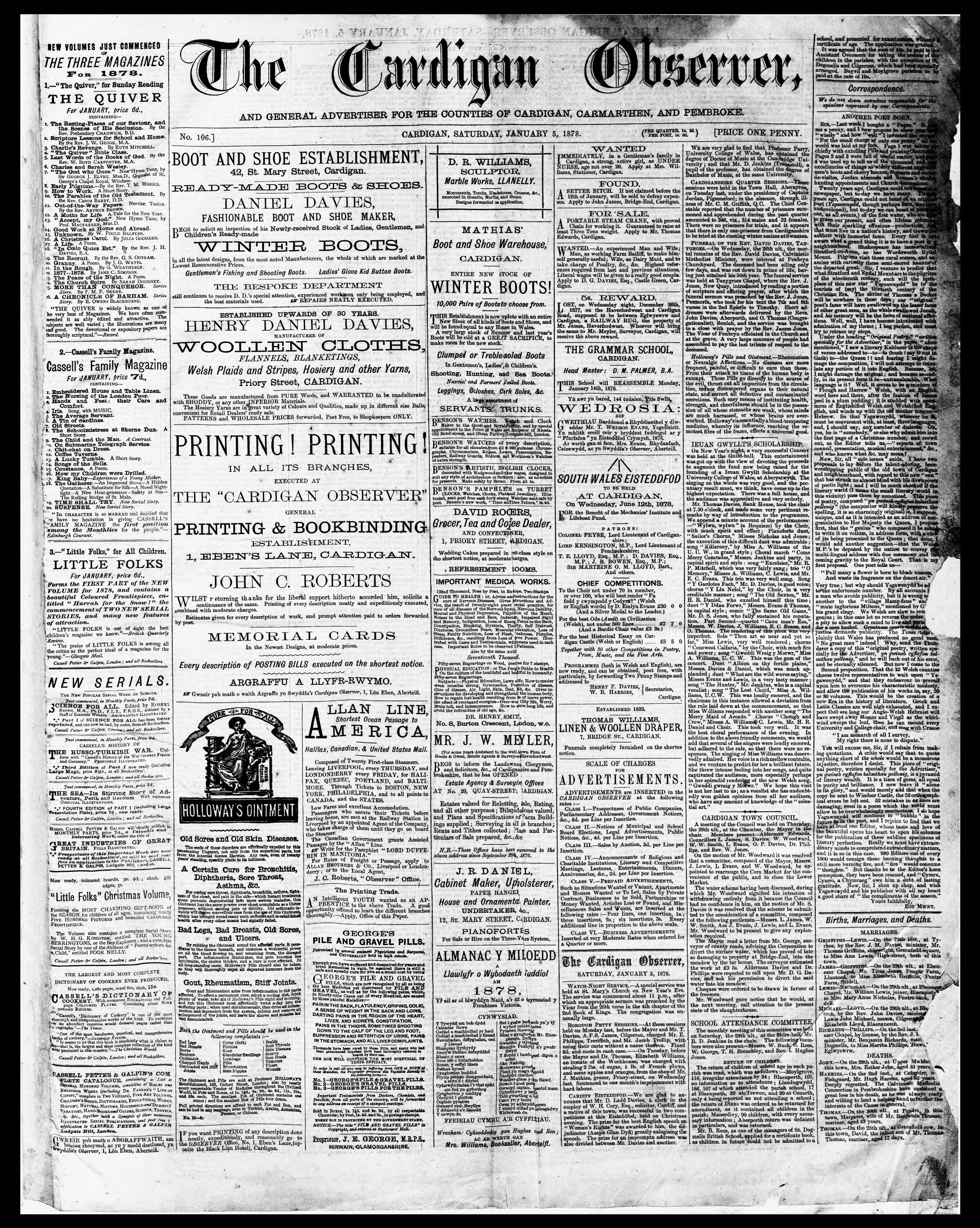
- The Cardigan Observer, and General Advertiser for the Counties of Cardigan, Carmarthen, and Pembroke
- Type: weekly newspaper
- City: Cardigan
- Country: Wales
- OCLC number: 751667810

The Cardigan Observer, was a weekly newspaper published mainly in English. It was circulated generally in the towns and villages of Cardiganshire, Carmarthenshire and Pembrokeshire.

Welsh Newspapers Online has digitised 640 issues of The Cardigan Observer (1878–1897) from the newspaper holdings of the National Library of Wales.
