= Llais Y Wlad =

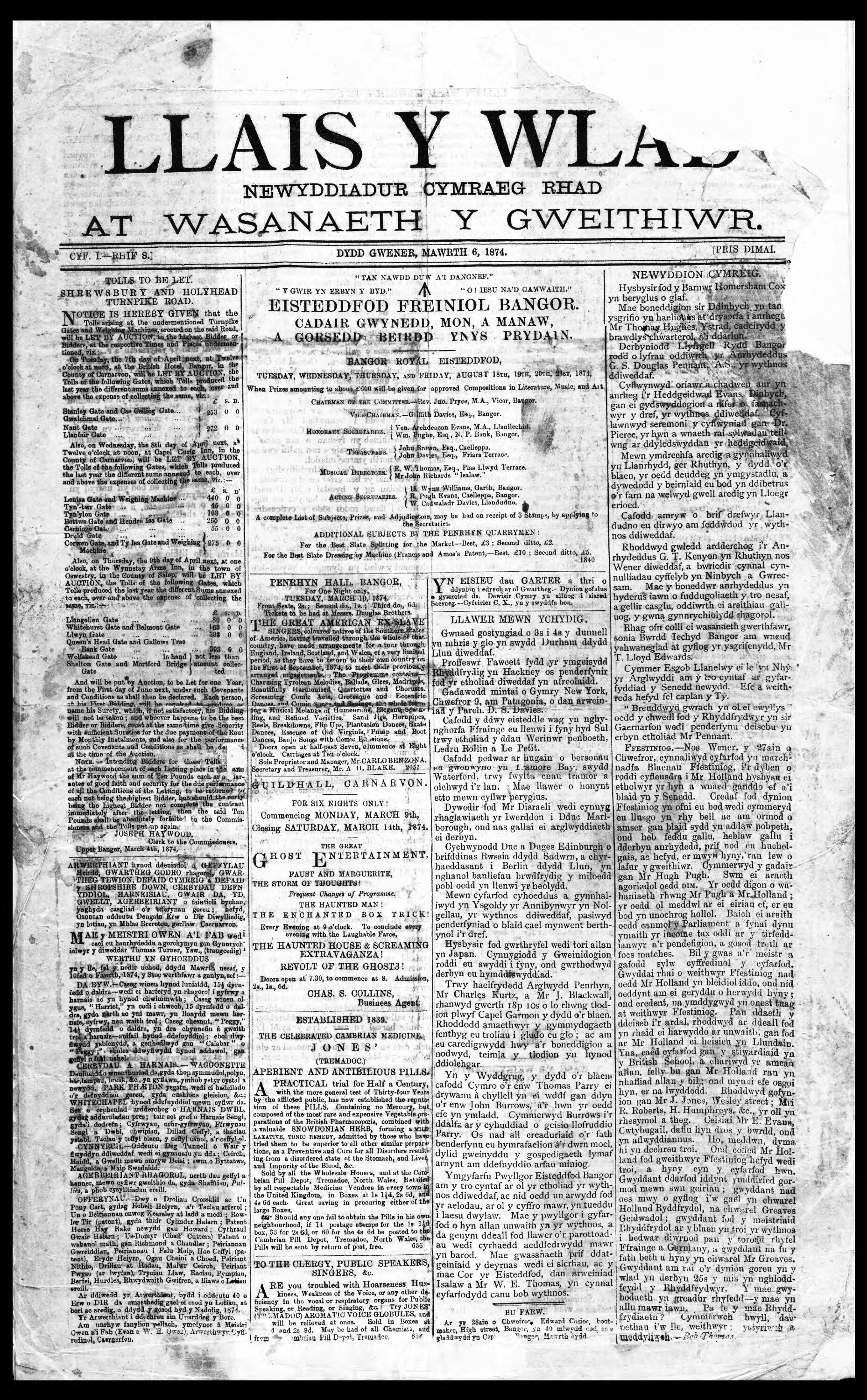
- Type: weekly newspaper
- City: Bangor
- OCLC number: 53177232

Llais Y Wlad (established in 1874) was a weekly Welsh and English newspaper with a conservative editorial point-of-view. It contained local and national news and information.

Welsh Newspapers Online has digitised 219 issues of the Llais Y Wlad (1874-1884) from the newspaper holdings of the National Library of Wales.
