= Mass media in the United Kingdom =

Coat of arms of the BBC

There are several different types of mass media in the United Kingdom: television, radio, newspapers, magazines and websites. The United Kingdom is known for its large music industry, along with its new and upcoming artists. The country also has a large broadcasting, film, video games and book publishing industries.

The United Kingdom has a diverse range of providers, the most prominent being the publicly owned and funded British Broadcasting Corporation (BBC).

The main BBC public service broadcasting channels accounted for an estimated 28.4% of all television viewing; the three main independent channels accounted for 29.5% and the increasingly important other satellite and digital channels for the remaining 42.1%. Sales of newspapers have fallen since the 1970s and in 2009 42% of people reported reading a daily national newspaper. In 2010, 82.5% of the United Kingdom population were Internet users, the highest proportion amongst the 20 countries with the largest total number of users in that year.

The BBC's largest competitors are ITV plc, which operates 13 of the 15 regional television broadcasters that make up the ITV Network, the Sky Group and the publicly owned and commercially funded Channel Four Television Corporation.

Regional media is covered by local radio, television and print newspapers. Reach plc (formerly Trinity Mirror) operates 240 local and regional newspapers. The Secretary of State for Culture, Media and Sport has overall responsibility over media ownership and broadcasting.

== Organisations ==
The British Broadcasting Corporation (BBC) is the national broadcaster of the United Kingdom. Headquartered at Broadcasting House in London, it is the world's oldest national broadcaster, and the largest broadcaster in the world by number of employees, employing over 22,000 staff in total, of whom approximately 19,000 are in public-sector broadcasting. The BBC is established under a royal charter and operates under its agreement with the Secretary of State for Culture, Media and Sport. Its work is funded principally by an annual television licence fee which is charged to all British households, companies, and organisations using any type of equipment to receive or record live television broadcasts and iPlayer catch-up. The fee is set by the British Government, agreed by Parliament, and is used to fund the BBC's radio, TV, and online services covering the nations and regions of the UK. Since 1 April 2014, it has also funded the BBC World Service (launched in 1932 as the BBC Empire Service), which broadcasts in over 40 languages and provides comprehensive TV, radio, and online services in Arabic and Persian.

The BBC operates several television channels nationally and internationally. The main two in the UK are BBC One and BBC Two, where each English region, Scotland, Wales and Northern Ireland have variations of the channel (excluding BBC Two in Scotland where it is BBC Scotland). Others include youth-focused channel BBC Three, cultural and documentary channel BBC Four, news channels BBC News and the BBC World News, parliamentary channel BBC Parliament, Scottish Gaelic-language channel BBC Alba, and two children's channels, CBBC and CBeebies. The BBC has ten radio stations serving the whole of the UK, a further seven stations in the "national regions" (Wales, Scotland, and Northern Ireland), and 39 other local stations serving defined areas of England. These are BBC Radio 1, offering new music and popular styles and being notable for its chart show; BBC Radio 2, playing adult contemporary, country and soul music amongst many other genres; BBC Radio 3, presenting classical music and opera, jazz, world music, drama, culture and the arts. The station broadcasts the BBC Proms concerts, live and in full, each summer in addition to performances by the BBC Orchestras and Singers. There are regular productions of both classic plays and newly commissioned drama. BBC Radio 4, focusing on current affairs, science, history, factual and other speech-based programming, including drama and comedy; and BBC Radio 5 Live, broadcasting 24-hour news, sport and discussion programmes.

In addition to these five stations, the BBC runs a further five stations that broadcast on DAB and online only. These stations supplement and expand on the big five stations, and were launched in 2002. BBC Radio 1Xtra sisters Radio 1, and broadcasts new black music and urban tracks. BBC Radio 5 Sports Extra sisters 5 Live and offers extra sport analysis, including broadcasting sports. BBC Radio 6 Music offers alternative music genres and is notable as a platform for new artists. BBC Radio 4 Extra, provided archive drama, comedy and children's programming. The final station is the BBC Asian Network, providing music, talk and news to this section of the community.

As well as the national stations, the BBC also provides 40 BBC Local Radio stations in England and the Channel Islands, each named for and covering a particular city and its surrounding area (e.g. BBC Radio Bristol), county or region (e.g. BBC Three Counties Radio), or geographical area (e.g. BBC Radio Solent covering the central south coast). A further six stations broadcast in what the BBC terms "the national regions": Wales, Scotland, and Northern Ireland. These are BBC Radio Wales (in English), BBC Radio Cymru (in Welsh), BBC Radio Scotland (in English), BBC Radio nan Gaidheal (in Scottish Gaelic), BBC Radio Ulster, and BBC Radio Foyle, the latter being an opt-out station from Radio Ulster for the north-west of Northern Ireland.

For a worldwide audience, the BBC World Service provides news, current affairs and information in over 33 languages, including English, around the world and is available in over 150 capital cities. It has an estimated weekly audience of 192 million, and its websites have an audience of 38 million people per week. The service is funded by a Parliamentary Grant-in-Aid, administered by the Foreign Office. BBC Online operates numerous sub sites that focus on different knowledge genre centred around the topics of science, nature and wildlife, arts and culture, religion and ethics, food, and history and language. For example, BBC Food contains recipes featured on various BBC cookery programmes, BBC History shares an interactive timeline of key events and individuals, BBC Nature contains a database of nature and creatures, and the language site teaches phrases and more in 40 languages. Included in this range was the well received Your Paintings website that catalogued every painting in public ownership for view. Other BBC services include BBC Music, BBC Film, BBC Earth, BBC Weather, BBC Learning, BBC Schools, BBC Research, BBC Archives, BBC Sounds, and BBC Culture.

The Channel Four Television Corporation is another publicly owned media company founded in 1982. Unlike the BBC, it receives no public funding and is instead funded entirely by its own commercial activities. It consists of 12 channels including Channel 4, Film4, E4, and its own streaming service.

Sky is a broadcaster and telecommunications company that provides television and broadband Internet services. Sky's flagship product is Sky Q and its flagship channels are Sky Showcase, Sky Max, Sky Arts, and Sky Atlantic. UKTV, is a multi-channel broadcaster, wholly owned by BBC Studios. It was formed on 1 November 1992 through a joint venture between the BBC and Thames Television. It is one of the United Kingdom's largest television companies. UKTV's channels are available via a digital satellite or cable subscription in the UK and Ireland. The Dave, Drama and Yesterday channels are also available on Freeview and Freesat, two free-to-air television services in the UK. Most programmes on the channels are repeat broadcasts of productions from the BBC Archives. Other players in the United Kingdom media include ITV plc, which operates 11 of the 15 regional television broadcasters that make up the ITV Network.

News UK is the current publisher of newspapers such as The Times and The Sunday Times. Reuters is an international news organisation founded and based in England. It employs around 2,500 journalists and 600 photojournalists in about 200 locations worldwide and is one of the largest news agencies in the world.

== Media centres ==
=== London ===
London dominates the media sector in the United Kingdom as national newspapers, television and radio networks are largely based there. Notable centres include Fleet Street and BBC's Broadcasting House. Specialist local paper City A.M. is a free, business-focused newspaper published in print Monday to Friday. It is typically available from around 6am at London commuter stations and is handed out at key points in the City, Canary Wharf and other central London locations.

=== Greater Manchester ===
Greater Manchester is also a significant national media hub. Notable centres include MediaCityUK a 200-acre (80ha) media production facility in Salford.

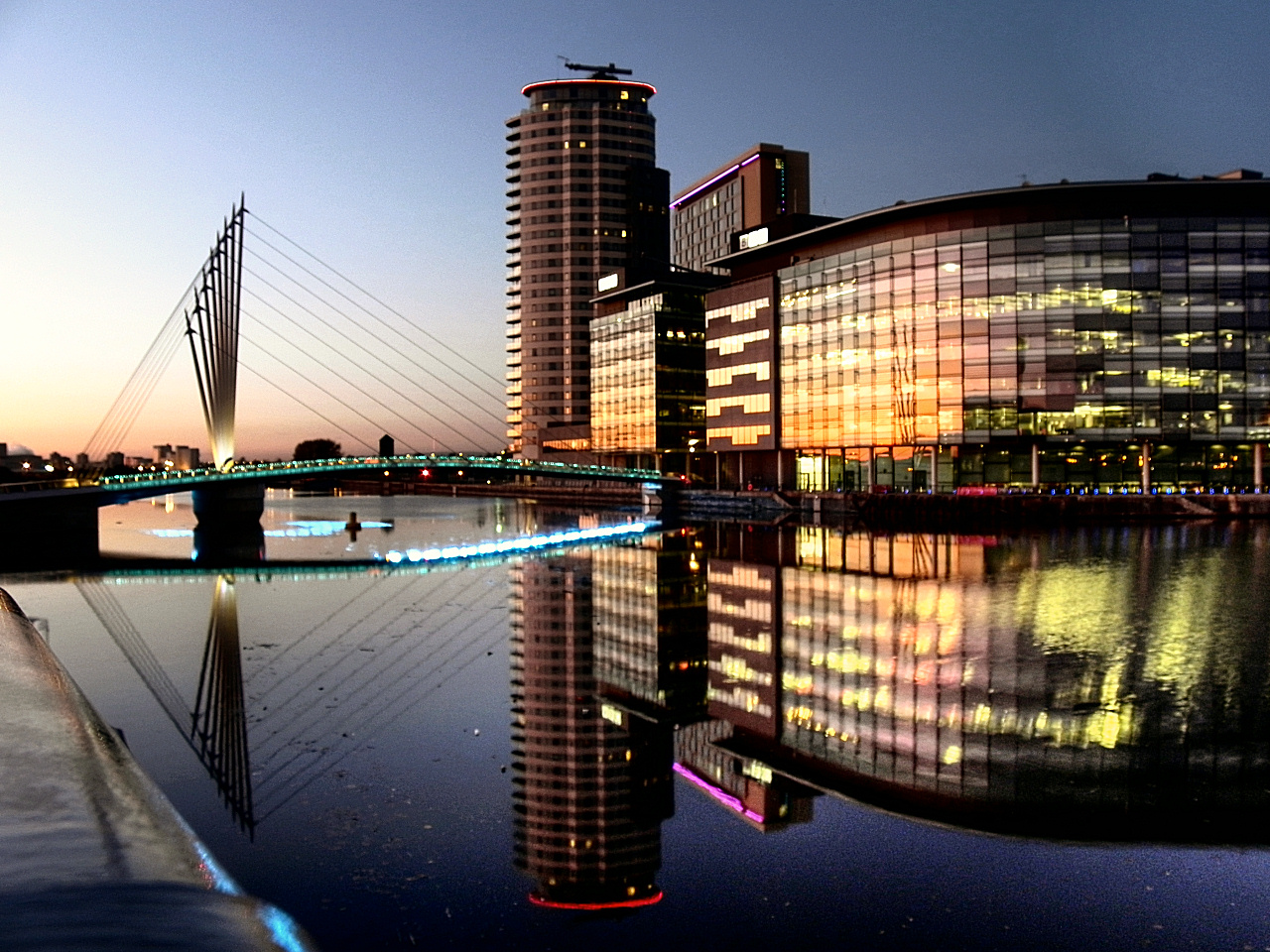
Mediacity in Greater Manchester is the largest media-production facility in Europe.

The Guardian national newspaper was founded in Manchester in 1821, and was known as the Manchester Guardian until 1959. In the 1950s, coinciding with the growth in television, the Granada Television franchise was set up by Sidney Bernstein. Consequently, the Granada Studios were the first purpose-built television studios in the United Kingdom. The franchise produced television programmes such as Coronation Street and the Up Series.

The BBC currently has two of its six major business divisions based here BBC North Group that comprises a number of important departments including BBC Breakfast, BBC Children's, BBC Sport, BBC Radio 5 and BBC North West. The other division is BBC Future Media. In addition ITV has two major divisions of its business based here ITV Studios responsible for UK and international network production and ITV Granada its regional service provider. The University of Salford also has a media campus and research center based at Media City.

=== Other key centres ===
Edinburgh and Glasgow, and Cardiff are important centres of newspaper and broadcasting production in Scotland and Wales respectively.

== Print ==
Freedom of the press was established in Great Britain in 1695. Founded by publisher John Walter in 1785, The Times is the first newspaper to have borne that name, lending it to numerous other papers around the world, and is the originator of the widely used Times Roman typeface, created by Victor Lardent and commissioned by Stanley Morison in 1931. Newspaper and publishing magnate Alfred Harmsworth played a major role in "shaping the modern press" – Harmsworth introduced or harnessed "broad contents, subordinate regional markets, independence from party control" – and was called "the greatest figure who ever strode down Fleet Street."

The Economist was founded by James Wilson in 1843, and the daily Financial Times was founded in 1888. Founding The Gentleman's Magazine in 1731, Edward Cave coined the term "magazine" for a periodical, and was the first publisher to successfully fashion a wide-ranging publication. Founded by Thomas Gibson Bowles, Vanity Fair featured caricatures of famous people for which it is best known today.

A pioneer of children's publishing, John Newbery made children's literature a sustainable and profitable part of the literary market. The History of Little Goody Two-Shoes was published by Newbery in 1765. Founded by Sir Allen Lane in 1935, Penguin Books revolutionised publishing in the 1930s through its inexpensive paperbacks, bringing high-quality paperback fiction and non-fiction to the mass market. Formed in 1940, Puffin Books is the children's imprint of Penguin Books. Barbara Euphan Todd's scarecrow story, Worzel Gummidge, was the first Puffin story book in 1941.

The Guinness Book of Records was the brainchild of Sir Hugh Beaver. E. L. James' erotic romance trilogy Fifty Shades of Grey, Fifty Shades Darker, and Fifty Shades Freed, have sold over 125 million copies globally, and set the record in the United Kingdom as the fastest selling paperback. Copyright laws originated in Britain with the Statute of Anne (also known as the Copyright Act 1709), which outlined the individual rights of the artist. A right to benefit financially from the work is articulated, and court rulings and legislation have recognised a right to control the work, such as ensuring that the integrity of it is preserved. The Statute of Anne gave the publishers rights for a fixed period, after which the copyright expired.

The United Kingdom print publishing sector, including books, server, directories and databases, journals, magazines and business media, newspapers and news agencies, has a combined turnover of around £20 billion and employs around 167,000 people. Popular national newspapers include The Times, Financial Times, The Guardian, and The Daily Telegraph. According to a 2021 report by the Media Reform Coalition, 90% of the UK-wide print media is owned and controlled by just three companies, Reach plc (formerly Trinity Mirror), News UK and DMG Media. This figure was up from 83% in 2019. The report also found that six companies operate 83% of local newspapers. The three largest local publishers—Newsquest, Reach and JPI Media—each control a fifth of local press market, more than the share of the smallest 50 local publishers combined.

=== Newspapers ===
Traditionally British newspapers have been divided into "quality", serious-minded newspapers (usually referred to as "broadsheets" because of their large size) and the more "tabloid" varieties. For convenience of reading many traditional broadsheets have switched to a more compact-sized format, traditionally used by tabloids. Online-only newspapers based in the UK such as PinkNews also exist.

The Guardian is a liberal, "quality" broadsheet and the Financial Times is the main business newspaper, printed on distinctive salmon-pink broadsheet paper. Scotland has a distinct tradition of newspaper readership (see list of newspapers in Scotland). The tabloid Daily Record has the highest circulation of any daily newspaper, outselling The Scottish Sun by four to one, while its sister paper the Sunday Mail similarly leads the Sunday newspaper market. The leading "quality" daily newspaper in Scotland is The Herald, though it is the sister paper of The Scotsman, and the Scotland on Sunday that leads in the Sunday newspaper market. In November 2014, a new newspaper was launched in Scotland called The National.

The Art Newspaper is a monthly print publication based in London. It covers news of the visual arts as they are affected by international politics and economics, developments in law, tax, the art market, the environment, and official cultural policy.

In March 2016, The Independent ceased printing its physical newspaper, becoming an online-only publication. On 29 November 2019, its sister newspaper, the i newspaper and the i's website were bought by the Daily Mail and General Trust (DMGT).

Reach plc operates 240 local and regional newspapers in the United Kingdom as well as the national newspapers Daily Mirror, Sunday Mirror and The People, purchased Northern & Shell in 2018. In 2018 TheGuardian.com, News UK and The Daily Telegraph created a joint platform for advertisers to buy online adverts across the multiple leading news websites, called The Ozone Project. Later in the year Reach plc joined the platform, bringing nearly all of UK's national newspapers onto the platform. As of 2020, the newspaper with the highest circulation is the free of charge newspaper Metro with 1,426,535 readers. The Sun and other tabloid daily newspapers have seen a large drop in circulation.

In March 2024, the Conservative government of Rishi Sunak announced a ban on acquisitions of newspapers by foreign states, following The Daily Telegraph and The Spectator purchases by an Emirati group led by Sheikh Mansour, deputy prime-minister and vice-president of the United Arab Emirates, virtually forcing those takeovers terminated.

==== Broadsheet and former broadsheet newspapers ====
Title	Days of publication	Circulation	Established	Owner	Format
The Daily Telegraph	Daily	N/A	1855	Press Holdings (Frederick Barclay)	Broadsheet
The Sunday Telegraph	Sundays	N/A	1961	Press Holdings (Frederick Barclay)	Broadsheet
The Times	Daily	N/A	1785	News Corporation	Compact
The Sunday Times	Sundays	N/A	1821	News Corporation	Broadsheet
Financial Times	Daily	104,024	1888	Nikkei Inc.	Broadsheet
The Guardian	Daily	111,953	1821	Scott Trust's Guardian Media Group	Compact
The Observer	Sundays	152,129	1791	Tortoise Media	Compact
i	Daily	148,163	2010	Daily Mail and General Trust	Compact
i Weekend	Saturdays	N/A	2017	Daily Mail and General Trust	Compact
The Independent	N/A	N/A	1986	Sultan Muhammad Abuljadayel; Alexander Lebedev; Evgeny Lebedev	Online only

==== Tabloid newspapers ====
Title	Days of publication	Format	Established	Owner
Daily Mail	Daily	Broadsheet (1896 – 1971); Tabloid (since 1971)	1896	Daily Mail and General Trust plc
The Mail on Sunday	Sundays	Tabloid	1982	Daily Mail and General Trust plc
Daily Express	Daily	Broadsheet (1900 – 1977); Tabloid (since 1978)	1900	Reach
Sunday Express	Sundays	Broadsheet (1918 – 1992); Tabloid (since 1992)	1918	Reach
The Sun	Daily	Tabloid	1964	News Corporation
The Sun on Sunday	Sundays	Tabloid	2012	News Corporation
Daily Mirror	Daily	Tabloid	1903	Reach
Sunday Mirror	Sundays	Tabloid	1915	Reach
Sunday People	Sundays	Tabloid	1881	Reach
Daily Star	Daily	Tabloid	1978	Reach
Daily Star Sunday	Sundays	Tabloid	2002	Reach
Morning Star	Daily	Tabloid	1930	People's Press Printing Society
Eastern Eye	Weekly	Tabloid	1989	Asian Media Group

==== Freesheet newspapers in urban centres ====
Title	Days of publication	Format	Established	Owner	Distribution
Evening Standard	Weekdays (evening)	Tabloid	1827	Alexander Lebedev (75.1%); Lord Rothermere (24.9%)	Greater London
Metro	Weekdays	Tabloid	1999	Daily Mail and General Trust plc	Wide availability in the major cities
City A.M.	Weekdays (morning)	Tabloid	2005	City A.M. Ltd	Wide availability in the major cities
The Shuttle	Weekly	Tabloid	1870	Newsquest Media Group	Wyre Forest area of Worcestershire
Asian Express	Weekly	Tabloid	1999	Media Buzz Ltd	
Yorkshire Reporter	Monthly	Tabloid	2013	Pick up Publications Ltd	Widely available in Leeds and its surrounding areas
Asian Standard	Weekly	Tabloid	2017	RF Publishing Ltd	Widely available as regional titles in Bradford, Kirklees, North East and Leeds

=== Magazines ===
A large range of magazines are sold in the United Kingdom covering most interests and potential topics. British magazines and journals that have achieved worldwide circulation include The Economist, Prospect, Nature, New Scientist, New Statesman, The Spectator, the Radio Times, and NME.

=== Books ===
In 1477, William Caxton in Westminster printed The Dictes or Sayengis of the Philosophres, considered "the first dated book printed in England." The history of the book in the United Kingdom has been studied from a variety of cultural, economic, political, and social angles. The learned Bibliographical Society first met in 1892. In recent years influential scholars include Frederic Sutherland Ferguson, Philip Gaskell, Ronald Brunlees McKerrow, and Alfred W. Pollard. As of 2020, seven firms in the United Kingdom rank among the world's biggest publishers of books in terms of revenue: Bloomsbury, Cambridge University Press, Informa, Oxford University Press, Pearson, Quarto, and RELX Group.

The University of Oxford's Bodleian Library was founded in 1602. The British Library was formally established in 1973 and is the national library of the United Kingdom. It is one of the largest libraries in the world. As a legal deposit library, the British Library receives copies of all books produced in the United Kingdom and Ireland, including a significant proportion of overseas titles distributed in the UK. The library is a non-departmental public body sponsored by the Department for Culture, Media and Sport. The British Library is also a major research library, with items in many languages and in many formats, both print and digital: books, manuscripts, journals, newspapers, magazines, sound and music recordings, videos, play-scripts, patents, databases, maps, stamps, prints, drawings. Its collections include around 14 million books, along with substantial holdings of manuscripts and items dating as far back as 2000 BC. The library maintains a programme for content acquisition and adds some three million items each year occupying 9.6 kilometres (6 mi) of new shelf space.

The Legal Deposit Libraries Act 2003 stipulates that the British Library receives a copy of every printed work published in the United Kingdom. Five other libraries are entitled to copies: Cambridge University Library, University of Oxford's Bodleian Library, the National Library of Scotland, and the National Library of Wales. The London-based Copyright Agency became the Edinburgh-based Agency for the Legal Deposit Libraries in 2009. In 2013 the publishing contributed to the UK creative economy with 231,000 jobs. British publishers such as Penguin Books and Pearson remain dominant players within the industry and continue to publish titles globally.

== Broadcasting ==
=== Radio ===
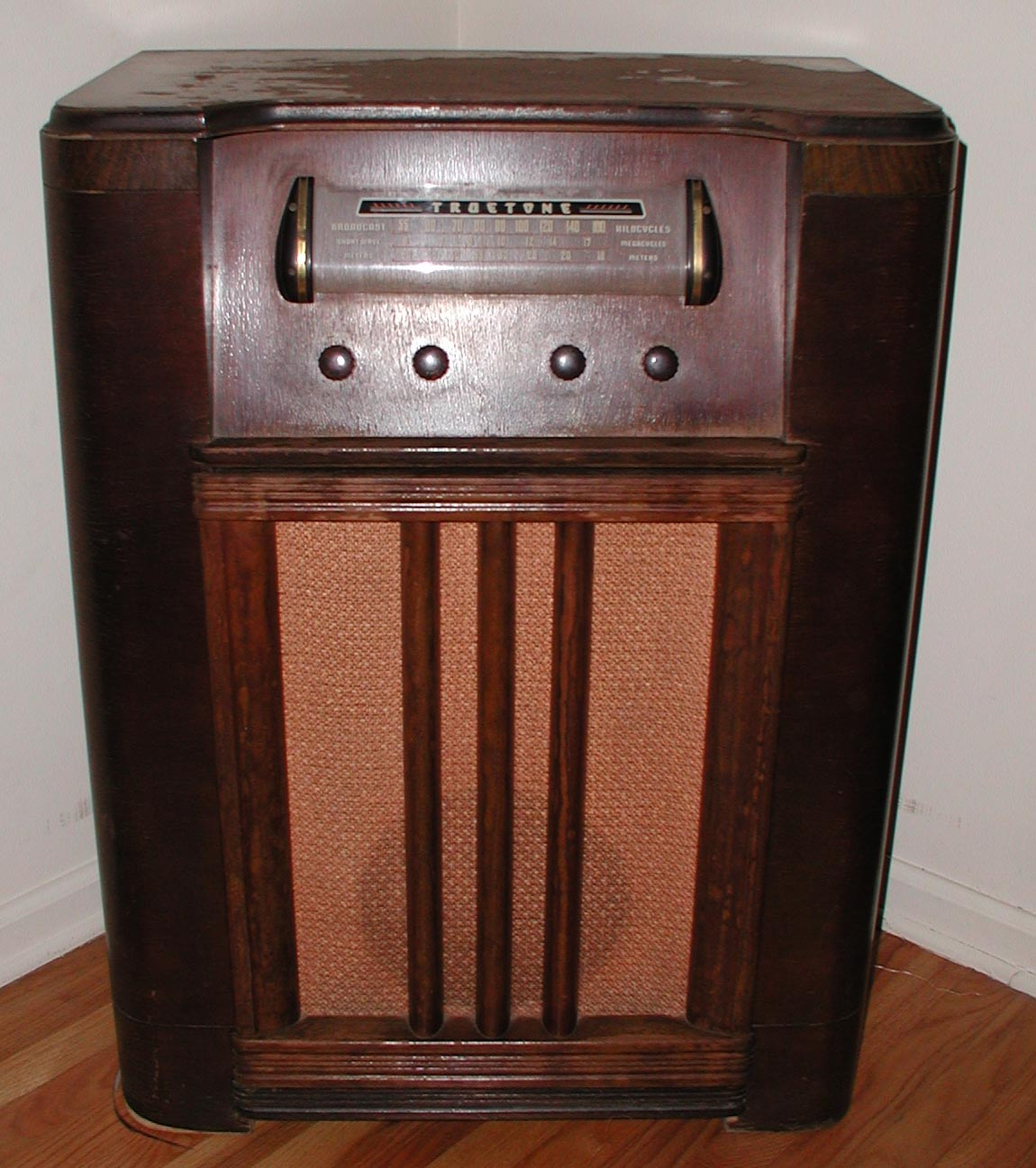
Picture of a Truetone brand radio

Radio in the United Kingdom is dominated by the BBC, which operates radio stations both in the United Kingdom and abroad. The BBC World Service radio network is broadcast in 33 languages globally. Domestically the BBC also operates ten national networks and over 40 local radio stations including services in Welsh on BBC Radio Cymru, Gaelic on BBC Radio nan Gàidheal in Scotland and Irish in Northern Ireland. The domestic services of the BBC are funded by the television licence. The internationally targeted BBC World Service Radio is funded by the Foreign and Commonwealth Office, though from 2014 it will be funded by the television licence. The most popular radio station by number of listeners is BBC Radio 2, closely followed by BBC Radio 3, BBC Radio 4 and BBC Radio 1. Advances in digital radio technology have enabled the launch of several new stations by the Corporation.

Rather than operating as independent entities, many commercial local radio stations are owned by large radio groups which broadcast a similar format to many areas. The largest operator of radio stations is Global Radio, owner of the major Heart, Smooth Radio and Capital radio brands. It also owns Classic FM and Radio X. Other owners are News Broadcasting and Bauer Media Audio UK. There are a number of licensed community radio stations which broadcast to local audiences.

=== Television ===
The United Kingdom has no analogue television. A free to air digital service is made up of two chartered public broadcasting companies, the BBC and Channel 4 and two franchised commercial television companies, (ITV and Channel 5) specialising in entertainment, drama, arts, science, nature, documentary, sports, comedy etc. In addition to this, the United Kingdom's free-to-air Freeview service runs a large number of entertainment, music, sport and shopping channels from the likes of CBS, UKTV and Sky. There are five major nationwide television channels: BBC One, BBC Two, ITV (ITV1/STV), Channel 4 and Channel 5 — currently transmitted by digital terrestrial, free-to-air signals with the latter three channels funded by commercial advertising. The vast majority of digital cable television services are provided by Virgin Media with satellite television available from Freesat or Sky and free-to-air digital terrestrial television by Freeview. The entire country switched to digital (from a previously analogue signal) in 2012.

BBC Four

The BBC operates several television channels in the United Kingdom and abroad. The BBC's international television news service, BBC World News, is broadcast throughout the world. The domestic services of the BBC are funded by the television licence and not only operates BBC One and BBC Two, but also BBC Four, the BBC News, BBC Parliament and children's television channels CBBC and CBeebies. The international television broadcast services are operated by BBC Studios on a commercial subscription basis over cable and satellite services. This commercial arm of the BBC also owns UKTV. Channel 4 is similarly chartered to the BBC, with a remit to provide public service broadcasting and schools programs, however it runs commercial advertisements to provide a revenue stream. It produces a number of digital channels, branded as Channel 4, as well as More4 and Film4.

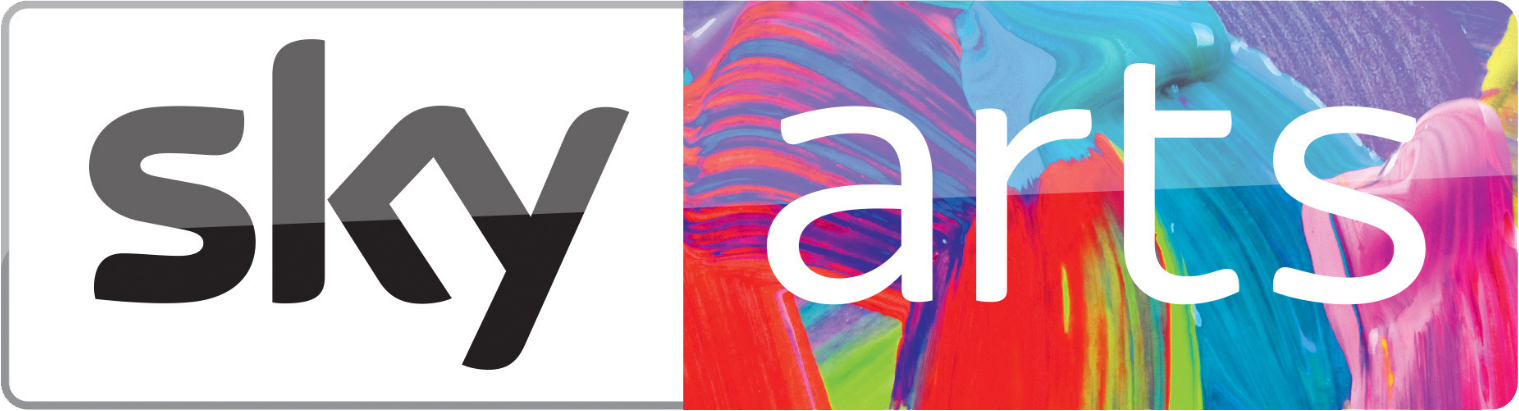
Sky Arts is a free channel dedicated to highbrow arts, including theatrical performances, films, documentaries and music (such as opera performances and classical and sessions).

The commercial operators rely on advertising for their revenue, and are run as commercial ventures, in contrast to the public service operators. The ITV franchise transmits two different networks in different parts of the country. These are known as ITV1 in England, Wales, Scottish Borders, Northern Ireland, Isle of Man and Channel Islands and STV in Central and Northern Scotland. ITV also operates ITV2, ITV3, ITV4, and ITVBe via ITV Digital Channels. The broadcaster Sky owns several flagship channels, including Sky Arts, Sky Showcase, Sky Nature, Sky Cinema and Sky Atlantic.

The Royal Television Society (RTS) is an educational charity for the discussion, and analysis of television in all its forms, past, present, and future. It is the oldest television society in the world. The Radio Academy is dedicated to "the encouragement, recognition and promotion of excellence in UK broadcasting and audio production". It was formed in 1983 and is run via a board of trustees, with a Chair and a Deputy Chair, and a Managing Director. Their responsibilities include designing, planning, and implementing projects and programmes.

== Internet ==
The United Kingdom has been involved with the Internet throughout its origins and development. The telecommunications infrastructure in the United Kingdom provides internet access to businesses and home users in various forms, including fibre, cable, DSL, wireless and mobile.

The share of households with internet access in the United Kingdom grew from 9 per cent in 1998 to 93 per cent in 2019. Virtually all adults aged 16 to 44 years in the UK were recent internet users (99%) in 2019, compared with 47% of adults aged 75 years and over; in aggregate, the third-highest in Europe. Online shoppers in the UK spend more per household than consumers in any other country. Internet bandwidth per Internet user was the 7th highest in the world in 2016, and average and peak internet connection speeds were top-quartile in 2017. Internet use in the United Kingdom doubled in 2020. The United Kingdom's most visited websites include google.com, youtube.co.uk, facebook.com, bbc.co.uk, google.co.uk, and ebay.co.uk.

== Regulation ==
Broadcast media (TV, radio, video on demand, streaming), telecommunications, and postal services are regulated by the Office of Communications (Ofcom). Ofcom has wide-ranging powers across the television, streaming, radio, telecoms and postal sectors. It has a statutory duty to represent the interests of citizens and consumers by promoting competition and protecting the public from harmful or offensive material. Some of the main areas Ofcom presides over are licensing, research, codes and policies, complaints, competition and protecting radio. Ofcom also oversees the use of social media and devices and analyses media use of the youth (ages 3 to 15 years old), to gather information of how the United Kingdom utilises its media.

Following the Leveson Inquiry the Press Recognition Panel (PRP) was set up under the Royal Charter on self-regulation of the press to judge whether press regulators meet the criteria recommended by the Leveson Inquiry for recognition under the Charter. By 2016 the UK had two new press regulatory bodies, the Independent Press Standards Organisation (IPSO), which regulates most national newspapers and many other media outlets, and Impress, which regulates a much smaller number of outlets but is the only press regulator recognised by the PRP since October 2016.

== See also ==
- Media of Northern Ireland
- Media of Scotland
- Media of Wales
- Western media
