= Flintshire Observer =

- Flintshire Observer, Mining Journal and General Advertiser
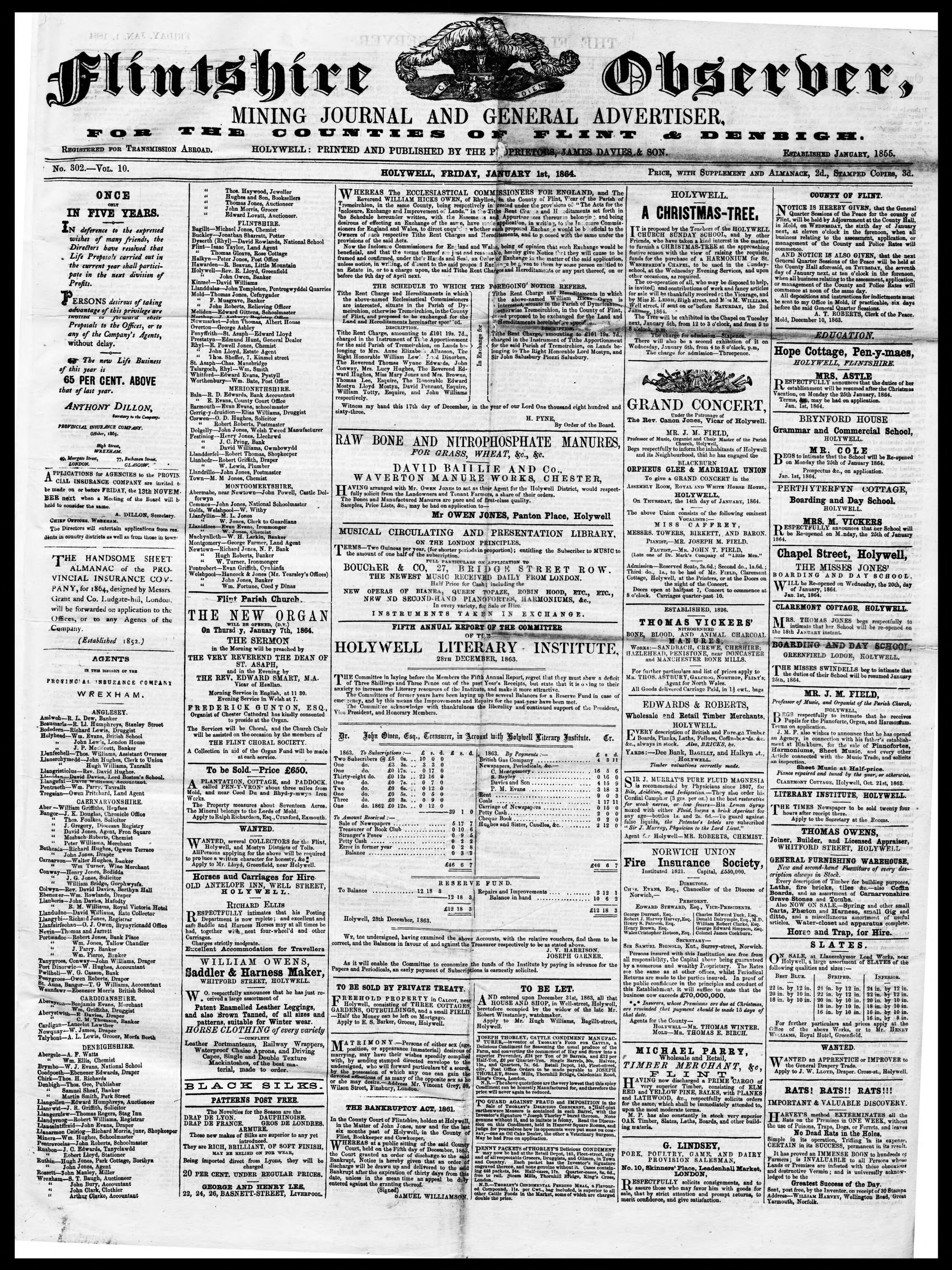
- Type: weekly newspaper
- Publisher: James Davies
- Founded: 1857
- Ceased publication: 9 January 1913
- City: Holywell
- Country: Wales
- Circulation: Flintshire, Denbighshire
- OCLC number: 750854995

Flintshire Observer, was a Weekly newspaper published mainly in English. It was first Published in Holywell in 1857 as the Flintshire Observer, Mining Journal and General Advertiser. From 1913 it was known as the Flintshire Observer and News and the paper was eventually incorporated into the North Wales Chronicle in 1964.
