= Media of Northern Ireland =

The media in Northern Ireland are closely linked to those in the rest of the United Kingdom, and also overlap with print, television, radio and the internet in the Irish Republic.

Broadcasting in Northern Ireland is a reserved matter and as such it is the responsibility of the United Kingdom's Department of Culture, Media and Sport and Office of Communications (Ofcom). Media development and production is supported by various organisations including the Arts Council of Northern Ireland and Northern Ireland Screen.

== Film ==
Northern Ireland Screen is the national screen agency purposed with promoting the development of a sustainable film, animation and television production industry in the province.

== Internet ==
Several media groups, such as Independent News & Media have "digital" departments selling their own online advertising, while Green Beans Media represents a number of smaller independent publishers with Northern Ireland audiences.

== Print ==
In Northern Ireland, the main newspapers are The Irish News, seen as supporting Irish reunification, and the Unionist-leaning Belfast Newsletter. The Belfast Telegraph, once the main evening newspaper in Northern Ireland, is now a daily cross-community newspaper. In January 2005 Daily Ireland, which was somewhat supportive of Sinn Féin was launched. It contended (in line with its politics) to be an all-Ireland newspaper; however, its sales were far stronger in Northern Ireland and Dublin than the rest of the island, and it closed in September 2006.

Fortnight, a monthly political and cultural magazine was published from 1970 until 2012. The Ulster Tatler is a lifestyle and society magazine, alongside sister publications Ulster Homes and Ulster Bride.

Regional newspapers are also published by Alpha Newspaper Group, Belfast Media Group, Johnston Publishing, North West of Ireland Printing and Publishing Company, Iconic Newspapers, and others.

Opinion on Northern Ireland is as diverse as that in the general public, ranging from the strongly anti-Republican line of the Sunday Independent to the more sympathetic Sunday Business Post.

== Broadcasting ==
Broadcasting in Northern Ireland is governed under United Kingdom law. The British Broadcasting Corporation operates a national region in Northern Ireland, known as BBC Northern Ireland, and one member of the BBC Trust is designated Trustee for Northern Ireland. The Office of Communications regulates the commercial broadcasting sector in Northern Ireland.

== Radio ==
Category: Radio stations in Northern Ireland

The first radio station to broadcast in Northern Ireland was 2BE Belfast, owned by the then British Broadcasting Company. Today, Northern Ireland has two national radio stations: BBC Radio Ulster, operated by the BBC, and the Ofcom-licensed Downtown Radio. The BBC also operates a local radio station in Derry, BBC Radio Foyle.

A number of local commercial radio stations (licensed by Ofcom) are also broadcast, including Q101.2 FM West in Omagh, Q102 in Derry and Cool FM- based in Newtownards and Q Radio 96.7 and 102.5 FM (Part of the CN Group) in Belfast. The five UK wide BBC Radio radio stations, as well as the three UK-wide Ofcom radio services (Classic FM, Talksport, and Absolute Radio) are also available in Northern Ireland.

Independent radio includes Downtown Radio and Cool FM owned by Bauer Radio. The Alpha Newspaper Group operates six radio stations throughout Northern Ireland. News Broadcasting owns the Greater Belfast station U105.

There are also numerous part-time and community based stations throughout Northern Ireland.

== Analogue television ==
Category: Northern Irish Television

The BBC began broadcasting television programmes in Northern Ireland in 1953. This was the first regular television broadcast station in Ireland. In 1959 Ulster Television (now known as UTV) began broadcasting as part of the ITV Network.

Northern Ireland currently has three analogue terrestrial channels: BBC One Northern Ireland, BBC Two Northern Ireland – both operated by BBC Northern Ireland – and UTV, the latter being the Office of Communications Channel 3 licensee for Northern Ireland, and thus part of the UK ITV network.

Today BBC Northern Ireland operates two television channels with local content, BBC One and BBC Two. ITV plc still operates the same "ITV Ulster" licence. Channel 4 has broadcast to Northern Ireland since 1982 but (apart from advertisements) does not broadcast Northern Ireland-specific programming. As part of the Belfast Agreement the Ireland's Irish language television station TG4 has begun transmitting from a limited number of locations in Northern Ireland.

To date, Ofcom has licensed two local television channels. The first, C9TV (Channel 9 Television), started in 1999 and broadcasts to Derry and the surrounding districts of Limavady, Coleraine and Strabane. In Belfast, NvTv (Northern Visions Television) started in 2004.

== Digital terrestrial television ==
In Northern Ireland, the UK's Freeview service is the DTT provider.

A significant amount of terrestrial transmission overspill exists between transmissions from north and south of the Irish border, with a large portion of the population of Northern Ireland currently able to receive digital terrestrial television and analogue television broadcasts from the Republic, and many in the Border Region of the Republic and beyond able to receive UK Freeview transmissions from North of the border.

== See also ==
- Media of Ireland
  - Media of the Republic of Ireland
- Media of the United Kingdom
  - Media of Scotland
  - Media of Wales
