= Y Tyst a'r Dydd =

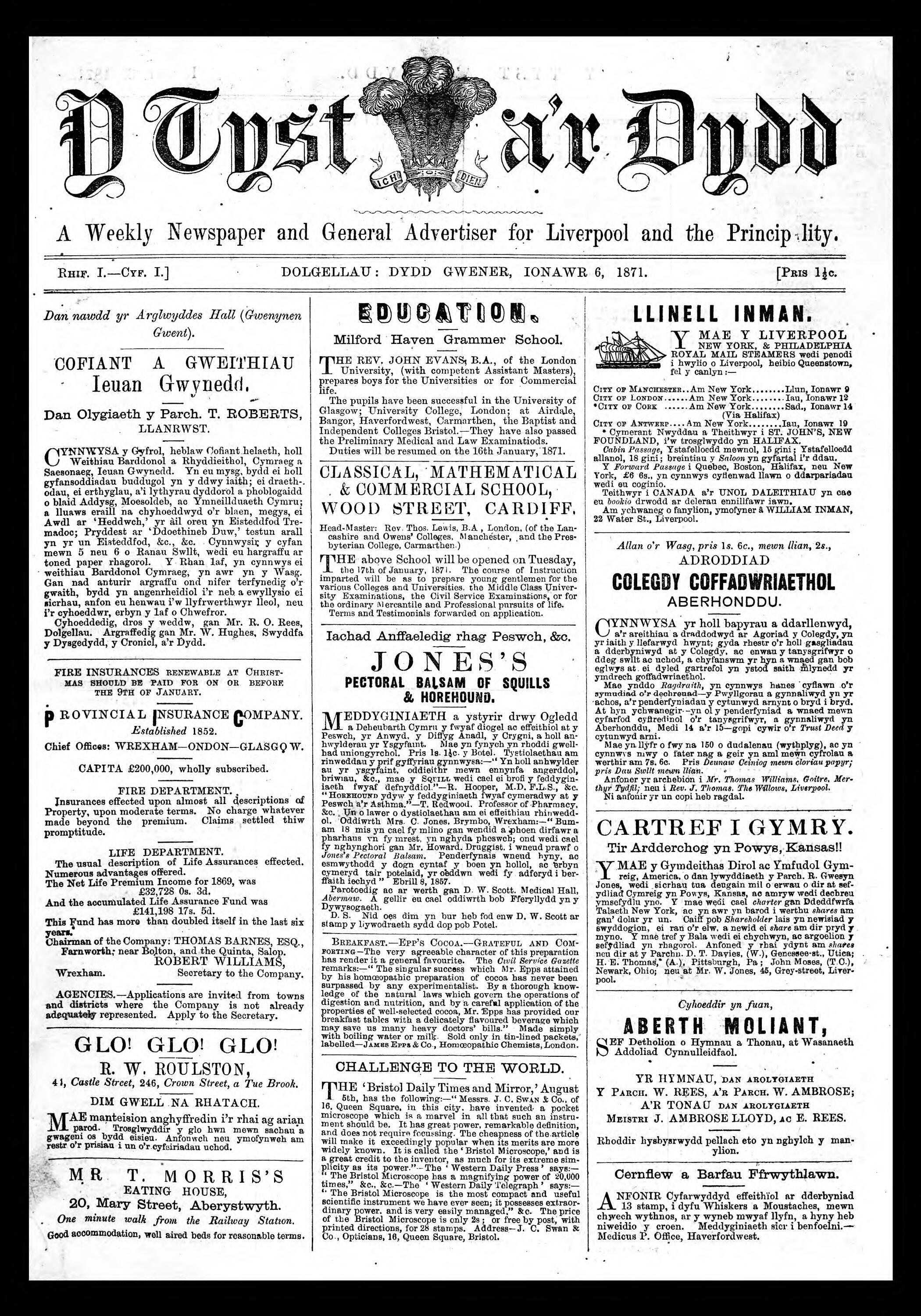
- Type: weekly newspaper
- Launched: 6 January 1871
- Ceased publication: 25 December 1891
- City: Dolgellau, Merthyr Tydfil
- Country: Wales
- Circulation: Wales, Liverpool
- OCLC number: 23069518

Y Tyst a'r Dydd was a weekly Welsh language newspaper established in 1871 as a result of the merger of Y Dydd' and Tyst Cymreig.

The newspaper was distributed throughout Wales and also in the Liverpool area. It contained general local, national, and international news. Associated titles: Tyst Cymreig (1867–1870); Y Tyst (1892- ); Y Dydd (1868–1954).
