= North Wales Gazette =

North Wales newspaper

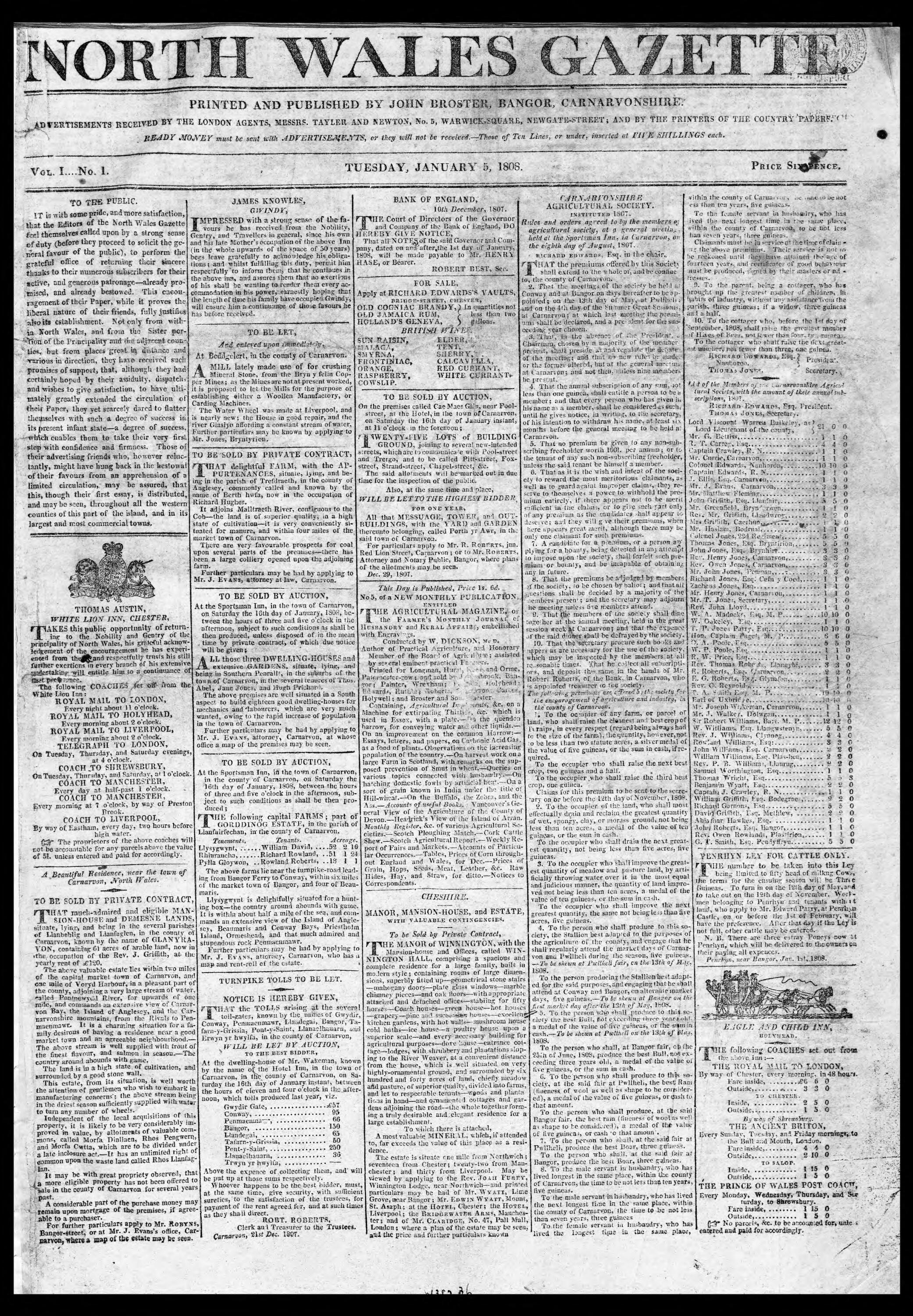
- North Wales gazette: or, general advertizer for the northern counties of the Principality, viz., Anglesey, Carnarvon, Denbigh, Flint, Merioneth, and Montgomery
- Type: weekly newspaper, newspaper publisher[*]
- Owner(s): John Broster (1808; 1816), Charles Broster (1817; 1827)
- Publisher: John Broster, Charles Broster
- Launched: 5 January 1808
- Ceased publication: 4 October 1827
- Relaunched: North Wales Chronicle
- City: Bangor
- Country: Wales
- Circulation: North Wales
- OCLC number: 35849483

North Wales Gazette was a weekly English language newspaper established in 1808 by the Broster family. The circulation area was North Wales.
