= Wrexham Recorder =

Welsh newspaper (1848–1849)

The Wrexham Recorder
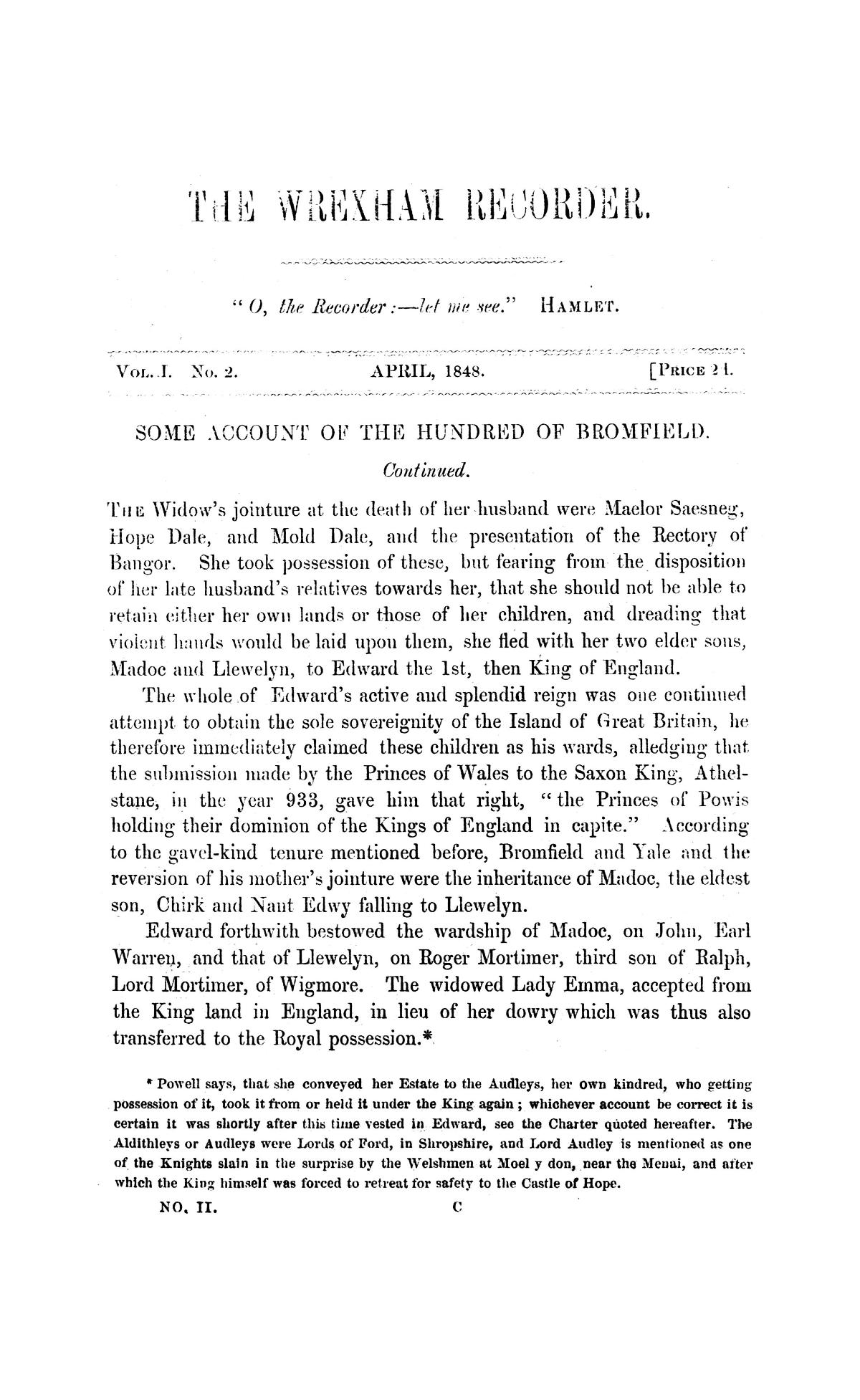
- The Wrexham Recorder; April 1848 edition
- Type: Monthly newspaper
- Founder: Richard Hughes
- Publisher: Hughes and Sons
- Founded: March 1848; 178 years ago
- Ceased publication: January 1849
- Country: Wales
- OCLC number: 49998186

The Wrexham Recorder (1848–49) was the first newspaper published in Wrexham. The first issue was published in March 1848 and the final one appeared in January 1849. It appeared each month to avoid the stamp duty which were levied on publications which appeared daily or weekly. It was priced at two pence. Its title was derived from a quote from Hamlet - 'O, the Recorder:-let me see' which appeared on its first page.

Lisa Peters commented that the Recorder consisted mainly of local news stories with very little national or political news or advertising.

Its price rose to three pence in January 1849. There was no indication that the January 1849 issue would be its last.

== Owner and Editor ==
The Recorder was established and edited by Wrexham printer and publisher Richard Hughes at his General Printing Office in Church Street, Wrexham.

== Rival ==
Hughes's former apprentice, George Bayley, commenced publishing a rival newspaper, the Wrexham Registrar in August 1848. Lisa Peters speculates that the Registrar brought about the newspaper's demise because its content was not sufficiently different from its cheaper rival. Bayley also established Wrexham's first weekly newspaper, the Wrexham Advertiser, in 1854.
