= Y Dydd =

Weekly Welsh language newspaper

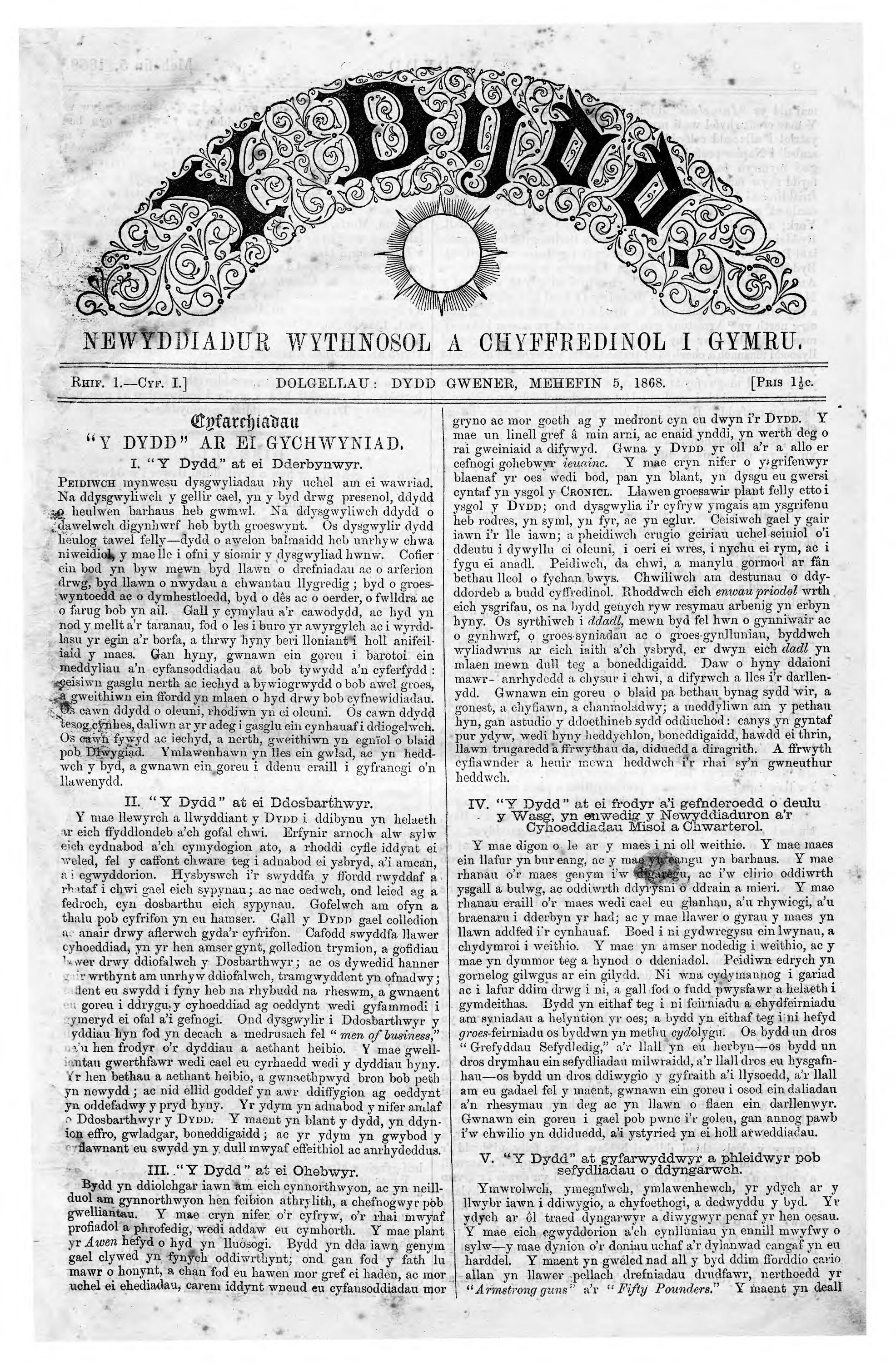
- Y Dydd: newyddiadur wythnosol a chyffredinol i Gymru
- Type: weekly newspaper
- Founder(s): William Hughes, Samuel Roberts
- Publisher: William Hughes
- Editor: Samuel Roberts
- Relaunched: Y Tyst a'r Dydd
- City: Dolgellau
- Country: Wales
- OCLC number: 500136945

Y Dydd ("The Day") was a weekly liberal Welsh language newspaper established by Samuel Roberts in 1868 that was distributed in North Wales. Y Dydd contained general political and religious news and opinions.

The paper briefly merged with the Tyst Cymreig to form Tyst a'r Dydd; however, it reverted to Y Dydd a year later. In 1954, Y Dydd merged with Corwen Chronicle and Border Advertiser. In 1992, Y Dydd again became a separate publication. It ceased publication in June 2017.

Y Dydd was published by William Hughes. Associated titles: Tyst Cymreig (1870); Tyst a'r Dydd (1871); Corwen Chronicle and Border Advertiser (1954); Y Dydd a'r Corwen Chronicle (1954).
