= Wrexham Guardian =

Former Welsh weekly newspaper

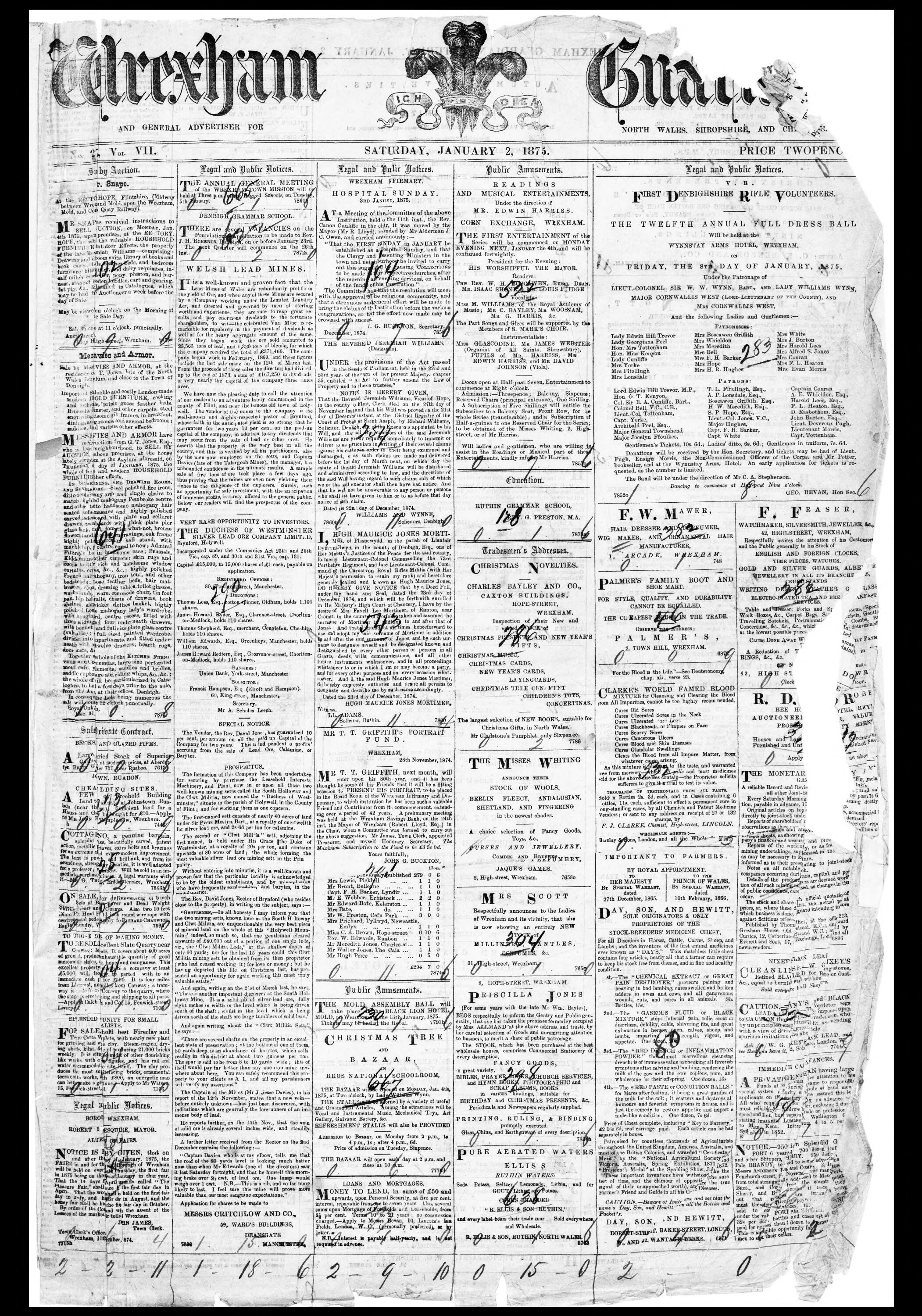
- The front page from 2 January 1875
- Type: Weekly newspaper
- Founded: 4 September 1869
- Ceased publication: 1954
- Political alignment: Conservative
- Language: English
- City: Wrexham
- Country: Wales, United Kingdom
- OCLC number: 750398181

The Wrexham Guardian was a weekly newspaper from Wrexham, a town in northern Wales. The first issue was published on 4 September 1869, and in February 1879, its name was changed to the North Wales Guardian. It continued under that title until ceasing publication in 1954.

The Wrexham Guardian was founded in response to Liberal successes in the 1868 general election in Wales. In response Welsh Conservatives established three Conservative supporting newspapers - the Guardian, the Western Mail, and Y Dwysogaeth - to promote the Conservative party. The Guardian first appeared on 4 September 1869. In its early years it suffered from a high turnover of editors and publishers and failed to make a profit, being kept afloat by political subsidies. In 1879 it changed its name to the North Wales Guardian.

The Guardian was established and owned by the North Wales Constitutional Press Company Limited - a group of local gentry and landowners - although its first issue was printed and published by James Ramsden, the owner of the Chester Courant. The Guardian received a subsidy of around £1,000 per year from local Conservatives. Despite this, the North Wales Constitutional Press Company continued to suffer from financial problems. The Guardian frequently attacked the Liberal MP for the Denbigh Boroughs, Watkin Williams, and in 1878 Williams revealed (and supplied evidence to the Guardian local Liberal-supporting rival, the Wrexham Advertiser) that the Guardian was surviving courtesy of a financial subsidy from Sir Watkin Williams-Wynn and George Kenyon, who hid their involvement behind the North Wales Constitutional Press Company. In August 1878 the newspaper was sold to Evan Morris and then to Frederick Edward Roe from Dover.

Roe was soon embroiled in a dispute with the Guardian's printers. He reduced the wages and number of printing staff and as a result was able to reduce the price of the newspaper to a penny in 1885. Roe sold the Guardian in September 1887 and in 1887 it was sold to Frederwick William Brodie and then Messrs Jarman & Co. in February 1894. The Guardian was then run by Sydney Gardnor Jarman under whom it "acquired a stable position" and then his son, Percy. The price was reduced to half a penny in April 1914. The newspaper ceased on Percy's death in 1954.

== Rivals ==
The Guardian's main rival was the Liberal-supporting Wrexham Advertiser.

== Sales ==
October–December 1873 average sales of 1,856 a week

1890 4,139 per week

1894 5,100 per week

== Premises ==
The newspaper's original premises were the Guardian Office in Bank Place, Wrexham.

1870 - moved to 26 Hope Street, Wrexham

1880 - moved to Argyle Street, Wrexham

== Distribution Networks ==
The Guardian was distributed by a variety of direct sales at the newspaper offices, post, messengers, hawkers, and agents. In its early years, it employed a regional networks of agents throughout north Wales and the border area including in Bangor, Abergele, Llanrwst, Dolgellau, Holyhead, Chester, Shrewsbury and along the main railway lines. However, by 1890 the agent network had scaled back to focus on the Wrexham area and the larger towns of north-east Wales. Lisa Peters speculates that this expansion and then contraction in the distribution network was due to the Guardian aspiring to be a 'regional' (as opposed to 'local') newspaper and that as a Conservative-supporting newspaper it needed to circulate over a wider geographical area in order to have sufficient buyers.

== Editors ==
1869- John Ramsden

John Vaughan

George William Spencer

Alfred Lloyd Row

Herman Behrens

1874-1878 William Garratt Jones

John Hamlyn Lakeman

1878-1887 Frederick Edward Roe

1887-1890 Frederick William Brodie

1890-Joseph Henry White (with Griffith Parry Edwards)

1890-1893 Griffith Parry Edwards

1893-1894 George Herbery Wykes

1894- Sydney Gardnor Jarman

Percy Jarman
