= Monmouthshire Merlin =

Welsh newspaper, 1829–1891

The Monmouthshire Merlin
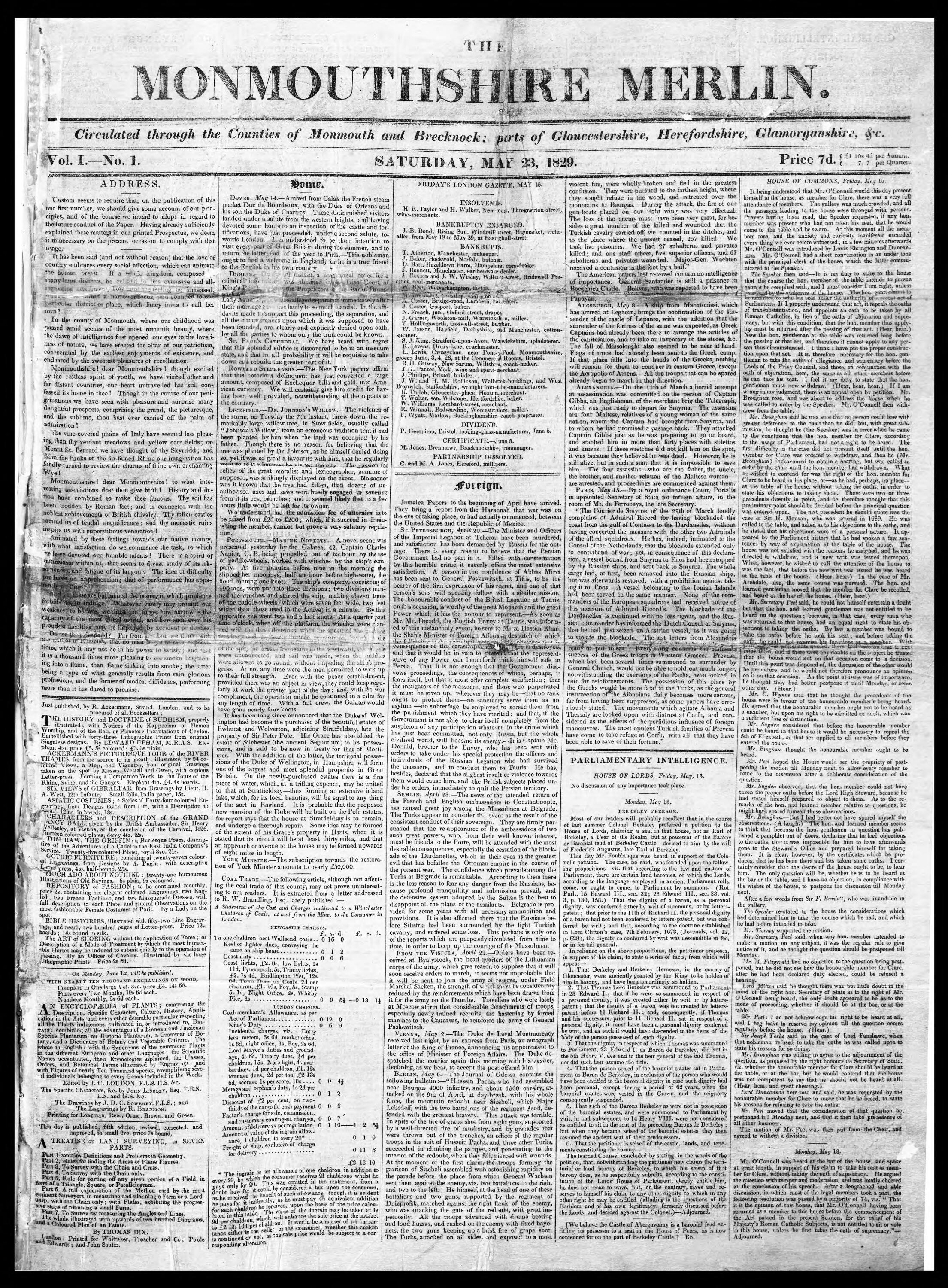
- The Monmouthshire Merlin, Issue No. 1, 23rd May 1829
- Type: Weekly newspaper
- Format: Broadsheet
- Founder(s): Charles Hough, Reginald James Blewitt
- Publisher: Charles Hough (1829- ca.1835), John Nash (ca.1835), Edward Dowling (ca.1835-1858) and William Christopher (ca.1858-1884).
- Founded: 23 May 1829
- Language: English
- Ceased publication: 27 November 1891
- City: Monmouth
- Country: Wales

The Monmouthshire Merlin was a weekly English-language newspaper published in Monmouth, Wales. It was first issued on 23 May 1829 and circulated in the counties of Monmouthshire, Brecknockshire, Glamorgan, Gloucestershire, and Herefordshire. The newspaper primarily reported on local and national news.

The paper was originally published by Charles Hough, with later proprietors including Edward Dowling (c.1835–1858) and William Christopher (c.1858–1884). Its subtitle changed several times, including Monmouthshire Merlin and South Wales Advertiser (1853–1855 and from 1860), and Monmouthshire Merlin and Glamorgan and Brecon Silurian (1856–1859).

Publication ceased on 27 November 1891. Digitised copies of the paper can now be found on the Welsh Newspapers Online project at the National Library of Wales.
