= Y Tyst Cymreig =

Welsh language newspaper

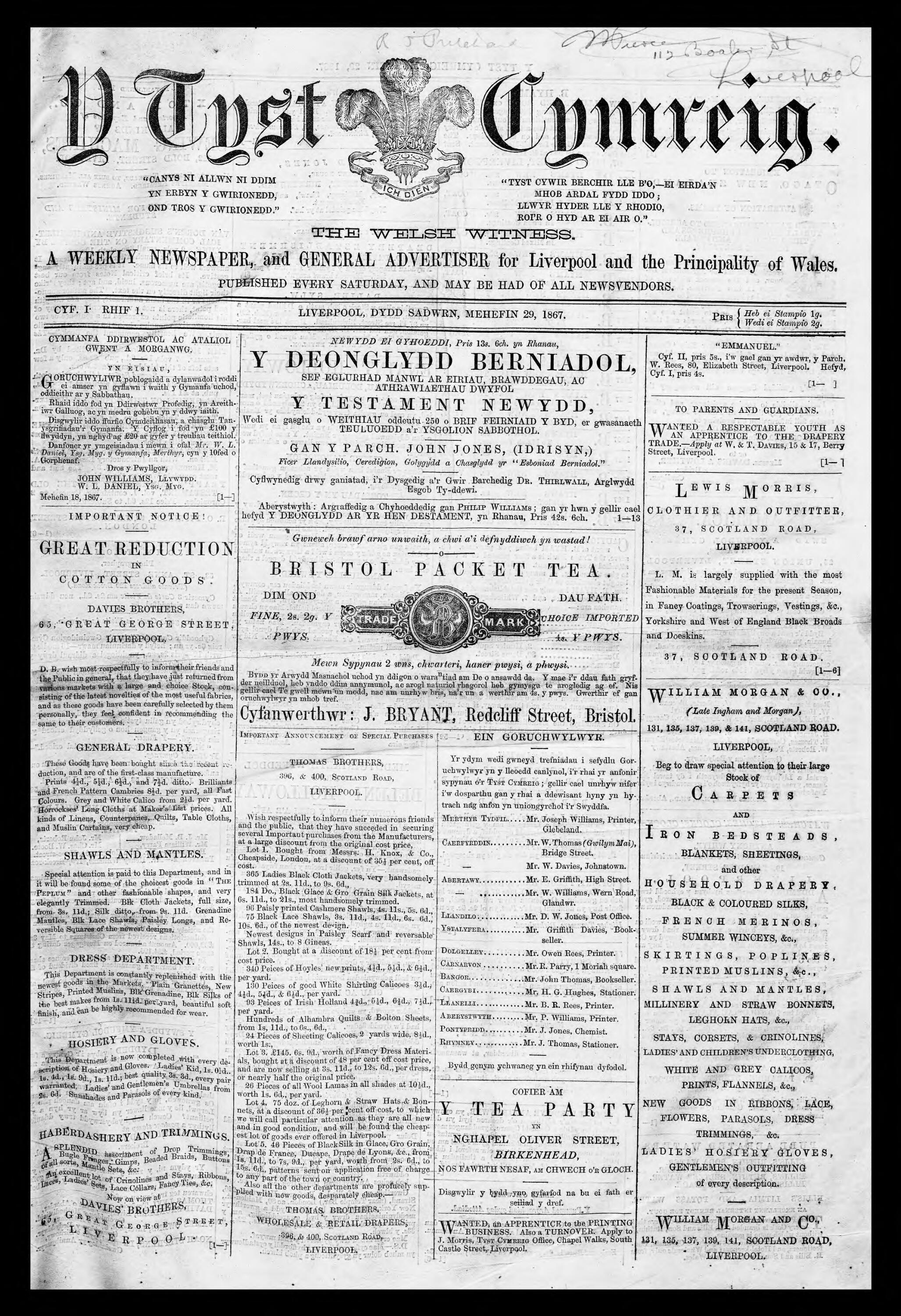
- Type: weekly newspaper
- Relaunched: Y Tyst a'r Dydd
- City: Liverpool

Y Tyst Cymreig ("The Welsh-language Witness") was a weekly Welsh language newspaper. It contained local, national, and foreign news. Although in 1871 it merged with Y Dydd ("The Day") to form Tyst a'r Dydd ("Witness and the Day") the arrangement did not last, and the Tyst a'r Dydd was moved to another publisher in Merthyr Tydfil. Associated titles are Y Dydd (1868–1870, 1872–1954) and Y Tyst a'r Dydd (1871–1891)
