= Dragon Radio =

Radio station in Wales

- United Kingdom
- Broadcast area: Wales
- Frequencies: DAB: 12C (Cardiff and Newport), 10C (Mid and West Wales), 10D (NE Wales and W Cheshire - DAB+)
- Branding: Wales' Greatest Hits

Programming
- Format: Oldies
- Network: Greatest Hits Radio

Ownership
- Owner: Nation Broadcasting
- Operator: Bauer Radio

History
- First air date: 4 June 2018

Links
- Website: http://dragonradio.wales/

Dragon Radio is a regional radio station, broadcasting to Wales on DAB. It is owned and operated by Nation Broadcasting.

As of March 2024, the station broadcasts to a weekly audience of 54,000, according to RAJAR.
