= Wrexham and Denbigh Weekly Advertiser =

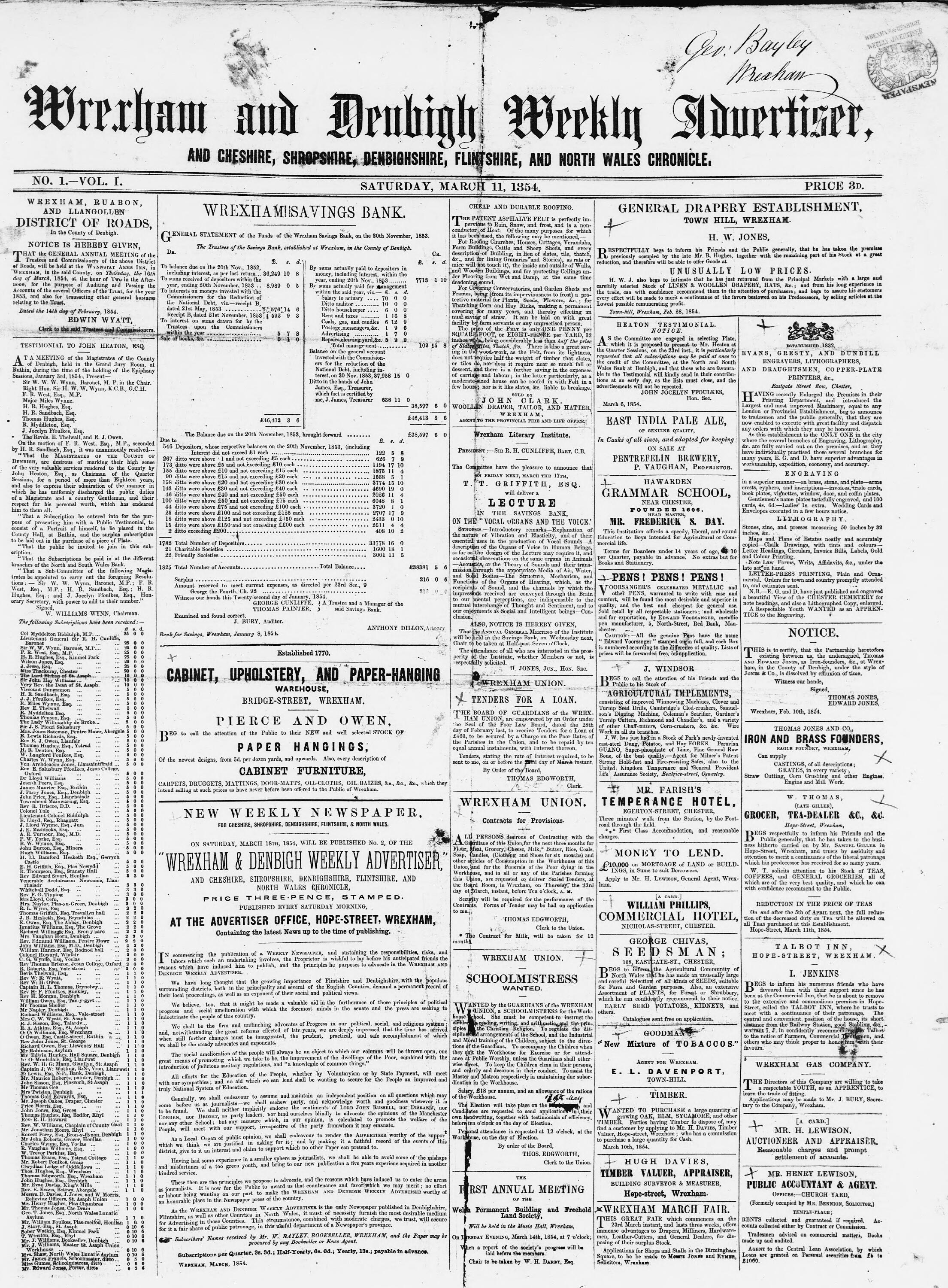
- Type: weekly newspaper
- Publisher: George Bayley
- City: Wrexham
- OCLC number: 610083577

The Wrexham and Denbigh Weekly Advertiser (established in March 1854) was a weekly English language newspaper in Wales.

It contained local news and information from north-east Wales and the border area. Although it claimed no political allegiance, it supported the Liberal party. It was published by George Bayley; after his death by the company Bayley & Bradley.

The Wrexham and Denbigh Weekly Advertiser was a successor to the fortnightly Wrexham Advertiser (1850–1854) and the monthly Wrexham Registrar (1848–49). It ran until 1936.

== Wrexham Registrar ==
The Wrexham Registrar and People's Friend (1848-49) was a monthly newspaper published in Wrexham. It was first published in August 1848 and its final issue appeared in December 1849. It was published at the General Printing Office in Hope Street, Wrexham. It consisted of sixteen pages and appeared on the first day of each month. It described its aims as 'Our pages will be devoted mainly .. to local affairs and local improvements. We shall endeavour to give all the aid and impulse we can to these reforms, SANITARY, SOCIAL AND RELIGIOUS ... We shall not, however, confine ourselves to local affairs, but shall endeavour both by original articles and judicious selections from the literature of the day, to furnish useful entertainment and instruction in the various branches of useful knowledge ... We, therefore, at once and frankly avow, that we are the advocates of a LIBERAL, ONWARD, REFORMING POLICY.' \The Registrar was priced at one penny, which was half the price of its local rival the Wrexham Recorder. Appearing monthly allowed it to avoid paying stamp duty.

The Registrar was founded by William Bayley and George Bayley, assisted by George's brother Charles George Bayley. It was common at this time, for newspapers to be a family concern. A. H. Dodd, referencing an editorial in its first number to 'expose and reprobate all nuisances, whether a certain odorous and stagnant abyss in Eagles Meadow, or the still more noxious stagnations which we may find the moral world', described it as 'honest and outspoken in [its] censure and praise.' Although no circulation information was provided, its second issue in September 1848 commented that 'our success has far exceeded our most sanguine expectations, both as to demand for the first number (which has not yet ceased) as well as the very numerous and highly respectable communication bestowed upon our first efforts, by persons of all classes and creeds.' Its content was mainly essays and articles on local history, along with local, national, and international news.

In March 1849 the newspaper shortened its title to Wrexham Registrar and reduced its size to twelve pages. Lisa Peters suggests that this change was due to the cesation of its local rival, the Wrexham Recorder.

In its final issue, the Registrar announced that it would become the Wrexham and Denbigh Weekly Advertiser. Lisa Peters speculates that the Registrar was established in order to discover whether there was a market for a second title in Wrexham (as the Recorder was already in existence) and a weekly newspaper as in August 1848 the Registrar stated that 'we are quite prepared to issue our periodical every fortnight.' However the Registrar and the Advertiser, although closely related, were two distinct titles with the monthly Registrar having more the look and feel of a magazine, than a newspaper, with its monthly publication and small size.

== Beginnings of the Advertiser ==
The first issue appeared on Saturday 11 March 1854 with the title Wrexham and Denbigh Weekly Advertiser, and Cheshire, Shropshire, Denbighshire, Flintshire, and North Wales Chronicle. it was a four-page broadsheet, priced 2d., 3d. if stamped.

Appearing weekly allowed the newspaper to provide the latest news from Wrexham and Denbighshire but as a weekly publication, the newspaper had to pay the one penny stamp duty until it was abolished in 1855. The price was reduced after stamp duty was abolished. The first edition appeared on Saturday morning, followed by a second edition on Saturday evening.

In 1867, the Advertiser held an anniversary dinner to celebrate its nineteen years of existence. The Mayor of Wrexham, Peter Walker, was invited but was unable to attend due to illness. The dinner was chaired by George Bradley and Charles George Bayley, with Mr. F. Sheard, overseer of the Advertiser office as a vice chair. The diners were entertained by a choir made up of Advertiser employees including D. Nicholson, H. Pickersgill, Joseph Pugh, William Jones, William Wright, and T. Roberts. Alderman Jones gave the toast and commented that he wrote the leader for the first weekly issue in 1854.

Its price was reduced to one penny in April 1895. In 1907 the day of publication was changed from a Friday to Thursday but the protests led to it being changed back to Friday less than a year later.

There was a steady rise in the number of medical advertisements published in the Advertiser, rising from an average of three per issue in 1855 to an average of thirty-seven per issue in 1880. The average then began to fall, reaching an average of fourteen per issue in 1910. Advertisements for 'Dr Williams' Pink Pills for Pale People' (owned by Canadian Senator George Taylor Fulford) appeared frequently in the Advertisier in the early twentieth century.

It published a Mold edition from 1909 and expanded to twelve pages in March 1914. It reduced to eight pages in September 1914. Due to the paper shortage, in February the Advertiser asked its agents only to order the number of copies that were regularly purchased and a month later, it informed its readers that it could only guarantee a copy to those who had placed an order with a newsagent.

After World War I, the Advertiser was challenged by the new Wrexham Leader and in 1933 Bayley & Bradley was sold to Rowland Thomas (the managing director of Woodall, Minshall & Thomas) and the directors of the Leader. The last issue published by Bayley & Bradley appeared on 24 June 1933. Publication was moved to Oswestry. In 1936 the Advertiser was merged with the Wrexham Star to create the tabloid-style Wrexham Advertiser and Star. The Advertiser and Star ceased publication in December 1945; recommenced in April 1953 before finally ending in December 1957. The Wrexham Leader moved to twice weekly publication to replace the Advertiser and Star.

== Title Changes ==
The title changed from the Wrexham and Denbigh Weekly Advertiser to the Wrexham and Denbighshire Weekly Advertiser on 2 February 1856. In February 1863 it became the Wrexham Advertiser and Denbighshire, Cheshire, Shropshire and North Wales Register. It final title change came in 1870 to the Wrexham Advertiser and North Wales News.

== Circulation ==
1857 - 550 copies per week

1859 - 2,000 copies per week

== Rivals ==
The Wrexham and Denbigh Weekly Advertiser had a rival in the Conservative-supporting Wrexham Albion (1854), later the Wrexhamite (1855–1857), and then the Wrexham Guardian (1869-1954).

== Ownership ==
After George Bayley died in January 1863, the newspaper came under the control of his widow Selina and his brother Charles George Bayley, and the new editor George Bradley. Together they established the company of Bayley & Bradley to print the newspaper.

== Premises ==
The newspaper's original premises were in Hope Street, Wrexham.

1857 - moved to Bank Street

1868 - moved to the Music Hall in Henblas Street.

== Distribution Networks ==
The Advertiser was distributed by a variety of direct sales at the newspaper offices, post, messengers, hawkers, and agents. Copies were sent to railway stations for rural subscribers to collect with delivery by the first train on Saturday and in 1896 it advertised for 'boys' to sell the newspaper on Saturday mornings. The first agent listing appeared in December 1850 with most of the agents being located close to Wrexham. By 1870 the Advertiser had four and a half times more agents as it did in 1854 and its distribution network extended throughout north-east Wales. The Advertiser's distribution network was at its most extensive in 1870 with agents located up to fifty miles away as by 1900 most agents were located within twenty miles of Wrexham.

== Editors ==
1854-1863 - George Bayley

1863-1890 - George Bradley

1890-1893 - William Charles Bayley

1894-1895 - Frederic Bowser Mason

1897-1907 - John Rice Jones (A H Dodd commented that the Advertiser "acquired a considerable reputation" under his editorship)

1907-1927 - James Wright

1927 - J G Benson
