= George Bayley =

Welsh journalist

George Bayley was a Wrexham printer, publisher, editor, and newspaper owner. He was born in 1821 and apprenticed to the Wrexham printer Richard Hughes, alongside his brothers William Bayley and Charles George Bayley. He co-founded Wrexham's second newspaper, the Wrexham Register in 1848, and Wrexham's first weekly newspaper the Wrexham Advertiser in 1854. George Bayley edited the Advertiser until his death in January 1863 at the age of 42. As a Baptist, he was buried in the Rhosddu Burial Ground in Wrexham.

== Member of Wrexham Town Council ==
George Bayley was elected as a Liberal member of Wrexham's first town council in 1857. He came fourth in the poll to elect the twelve councillors.

== Family ==
By his wife, Selina, he had five children including the journalists William Charles Bayley and George Robert Bayley.
