= North Wales Chronicle =

Newspaper

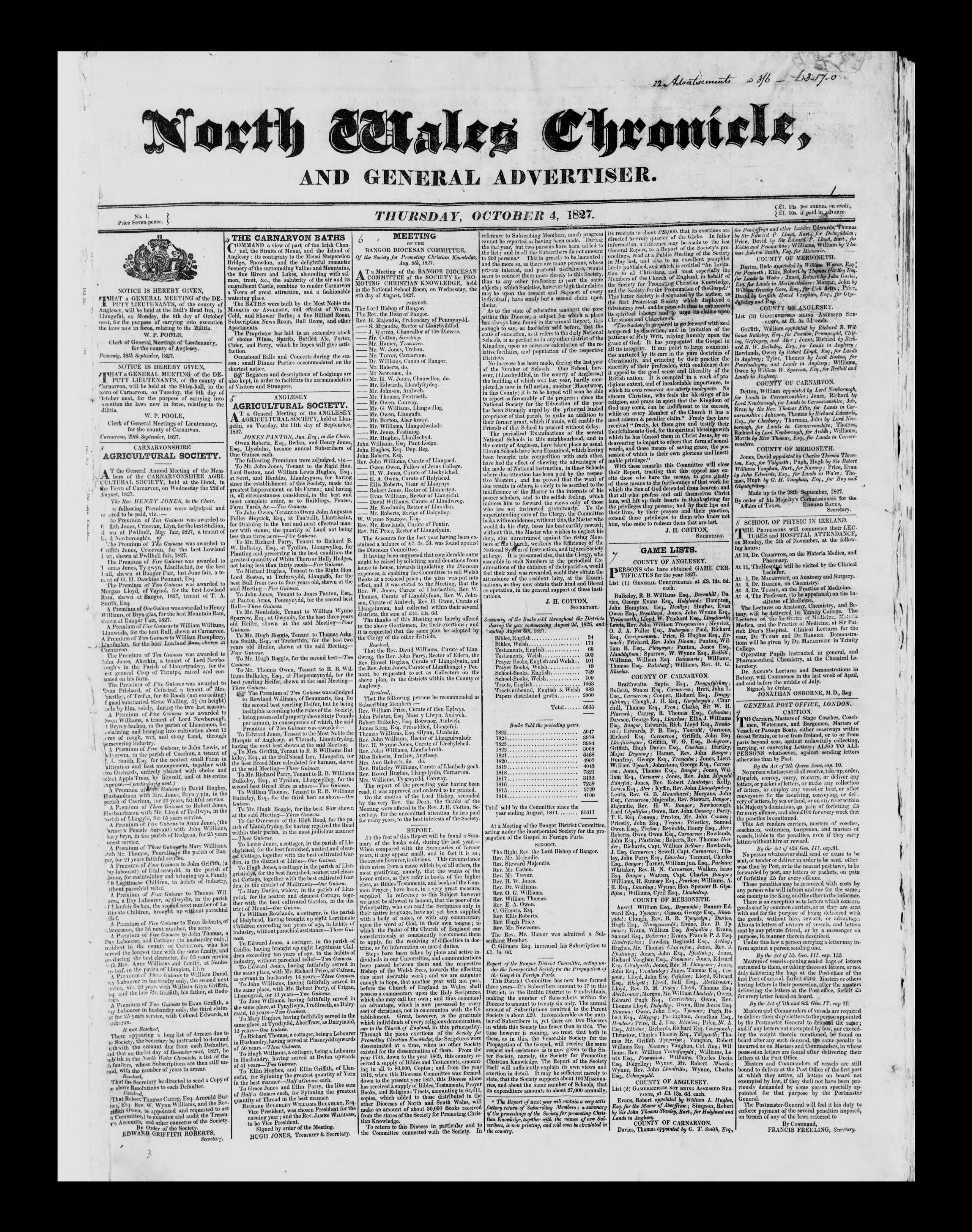
- Front page of the earliest surviving copy of the Welsh newspaper North Wales Chronicle; 4 October 1827
- Type: Weekly newspaper
- Language: English
- Headquarters: Wales
- Country: United Kingdom
- Website: northwaleschronicle.co.uk

The North Wales Chronicle is a weekly regional newspaper based in Bangor, Gwynedd, Wales, owned by NWN Media. News coverage is mainly concerning north Gwynedd, including the city of Bangor and town of Caernarfon, as well as the Isle of Anglesey.

Established in 1808, it is possibly the oldest weekly newspaper in Wales. It is the only free newspaper in Gwynedd and Anglesey, and is no longer registered with ABC for verification of circulation figures.
