= Welsh Newspapers Online =

Digitised newspaper collection

Welsh Newspapers Online is the searchable digital archive of historic Welsh newspaper holdings of the National Library of Wales. It is a work in progress and, as of September 2016, over 1,100,000 newspaper pages from 120 newspapers were available free online, comprising over 15 million articles including news, family notices and advertising. The years covered are from 1804 to 1919, and a brief history and listing of relevant newspapers is provided. Copyright provisions are frequently described as "unknown" in the context of an otherwise explicit overall policy.

== See also ==
- List of newspapers in Wales
- Media of Wales
- Media Wales
- NLW digital content
