= Russian Automobile Federation =

Association of motorists

- Российская автомобильная федерация
- Sport: Motorsports
- Abbreviation: RAF
- Founded: November 30, 1991
- Affiliation: FIA
- Regional affiliation: Russia
- Headquarters: Moscow, Russia
- President: Boris Rotenberg
- Vice president: Anton Nemkin

Official website
- www.raf.su
- (Russia)

Flag of the RAF used to represent neutral competitors

The Russian Automobile Federation (RAF) (Russian: Российская автомобильная федерация, romanized: Rossiyskaya avtomobilnaya federatsiya) is an FIA-affiliated association of motorists based in Russia founded in 1991.

== History ==
On 11 December 1992, the FIA General Assembly accepted the RAF as a member of the FIA and granted the RAF the right to exercise sports power throughout the national territory of the Russian Federation.

Victor Kiryanov served as President of the RAF from 2003 to 2024. Boris Rotenberg was elected as his successor in May 2024.

=== Use as a representative nationality ===
Beginning in 2021, Russian motorsport competitors are designated as representatives of the RAF after the Court of Arbitration for Sport upheld the ban on Russia, barring it from competing under its flag in international sporting events following the doping scandal at the 2014 Winter Olympics in Sochi.

The following entrants were listed as RAF competitors while they were banned from representing Russia.

Entrant	Type	Years	Notes	Ref.
Formula One
Nikita Mazepin	Driver	2021	#9 Haas F1 Team	
FIA World Endurance Championship
G-Drive Racing	Team	2021–2022		
Roman Rusinov	Driver	2021		
Sergey Sirotkin	Driver (reserve entry)	2021		
Daniil Kvyat	Driver	2022		
World Rally Championship-2
Nikolay Gryazin	Driver	2021	Toksport WRT 2	
Konstantin Aleksandrov	Co-driver	2021	Toksport WRT 2	
Dakar Rally
Quads
Chyr Mari	Team	2022	#193 Yamaha YFM 700R	
Aleksandr Maksimov	Driver	2022	#193 Yamaha YFM 700R	
Cars
VRT Team	Team	2022	#208 BMW X5	
Vladimir Vasilyev	Driver	2022	#208 BMW X5	
MSK Rally Team	Team	2022	#216 Mini John Cooper Works Buggy	
Denis Krotov	Driver	2022	#216 Mini John Cooper Works Buggy	
Konstantin Zhiltsov	Co-driver	2022	#216 Mini John Cooper Works Buggy	
Alexey Kuzmich	Co-driver	2022	#218 X-raid–Mini John Cooper Works Buggy	
Light Prototypes
MSK Rally Team	Team	2022	#312 Can-Am Maverick	
Pavel Lebedev	Driver	2022	#312 Can-Am Maverick	
Kirill Shubin	Co-driver	2022	#312 Can-Am Maverick	
Boris Gadasin	Driver	2022	#315 G-Force Motorsport – G-Force T3GF	
Dmitry Pavlov	Co-driver	2022	#315 G-Force Motorsport – G-Force T3GF	
Andrey Novikov	Driver	2022	#320 G-Force Motorsport – G-Force T3GF	
Dmitrii Kozhukhov	Co-driver	2022	#320 G-Force Motorsport – G-Force T3GF	
Team Maria Oparina	Team	2022	#323 Can-Am Maverick X3	
Maria Oparina	Driver	2022	#323 Can-Am Maverick X3	
Light Prototypes (SSV)
Xesha Motorsport	Team	2022	#465 BRP Maverick X3	
Tatiana Sycheva	Driver	2022	#465 BRP Maverick X3	
Aleksandr Alekseev	Co-driver	2022	#465 BRP Maverick X3	
Trucks
Kamaz-Master	Team	2022		
Dmitry Sotnikov	Driver	2022	#500 Kamaz K5 435091	
Ruslan Akhmadeev	Co-driver	2022	#500 Kamaz K5 435091	
Ilgiz Akhmetzianov	Technician	2022	#500 Kamaz K5 435091	
Anton Shibalov	Driver	2022	#501 Kamaz 43509	
Dmitrii Nikitin	Co-driver	2022	#501 Kamaz 43509	
Ivan Tatarinov	Technician	2022	#501 Kamaz 43509	
Eduard Nikolaev	Driver	2022	#505 Kamaz K5 435091	
Evgenii Iakovlev	Co-driver	2022	#505 Kamaz K5 435091	
Vladimir Rybakov	Technician	2022	#505 Kamaz K5 435091	
Andrey Karginov	Driver	2022	#509 Kamaz 43509	
Andrey Mokeev	Co-driver	2022	#509 Kamaz 43509	
Ivan Malkov	Technician	2022	#509 Kamaz 43509	

== World Rally Cup results ==
The RAF entered the 1994 Rally Finland in the 2-litre category, with one car retiring and the other coming in 22nd (but winning in the A6 class).

Year	Entrant	Car	No	Driver	Rally							
Year	Entrant	Car	No	Driver	SWE	PRT	GRC	FIN	AUS	ITA	ESP	WLS
1994	Russian Automobile Federation	Lada Samara	41	(Russia) Sergey Alyasov				Ret				
1994	Russian Automobile Federation	Lada Samara	43	(Russia) Aleksandr Nikonenko				22				
