= 1993 FIA 2-Litre World Rally Cup =

Auto racing championship

The 1993 FIA 2-Litre World Rally Cup was the first season of the FIA 2-Litre World Rally Cup, an auto racing championship recognized by the Fédération Internationale de l'Automobile, running in support of the World Rally Championship. It was created for cars with engine size below 2 Litres. Bruno Thiry claimed the inaugural Drivers' Championship title while General Motors Europe gained the Manufacturers' Championship thanks to the Astra GSi 16V from Opel and Vauxhall.

== Season summary ==
Round	Event name	Winning driver	Winning co-driver	Winning car	Report
1	(Monaco) 61. Rallye Automobile de Monte-Carlo 1993	(Belgium) Bruno Thiry	(Belgium) Stéphane Prévot	(Germany) Opel Astra GSi 16V	Report
2	(Sweden) 42. International Swedish Rally 1993	(Sweden) Per Svan	(Sweden) Johan Olsson	(Germany) Opel Astra GSi 16V	Report
3	27. Rallye de Portugal - Vinho do Porto 1993	(Belgium) Bruno Thiry	(Belgium) Stéphane Prévot	(Germany) Opel Astra GSi 16V	Report
4	37. Tour de Corse - Rallye de France 1993	(France) Jean Ragnotti	(France) Gilles Thimonier	(France) Renault Clio Williams	Report
5	(Greece) 40. Acropolis Rally 1993	(Czech Republic) Emil Triner	(Czech Republic) Jiří Klíma	(Czech Republic) Škoda Favorit 136L	Report
6	13. Rally YPF Argentina 1993	(Argentina) Gabriel Raies	(Argentina) Jose Maria Volta	(Argentina) Renault 18 GTX	Report
7	24. Rothmans Rally New Zealand 1993	(Russia) Aleksandr Artemenko	(Russia) Viktor Timkovskiy	(Russia) Lada Samara	Report
8	(Finland) 43. 1000 Lakes Rally 1993	(Belgium) Bruno Thiry	(Belgium) Stéphane Prévot	(Germany) Opel Astra GSi 16V	Report
9	(Italy) 35. Rallye Sanremo - Rallye d'Italia 1993	(Belgium) Bruno Thiry	(Belgium) Stéphane Prévot	(Germany) Opel Astra GSi 16V	Report
10	(Spain) 29. Rallye Catalunya - Costa Brava - Rallye de España 1993	(Belgium) Bruno Thiry	(Belgium) Stéphane Prévot	(Germany) Opel Astra GSi 16V	Report
11	(United Kingdom) 49. Network Q RAC Rally 1993	(United Kingdom) David Llewellin	(United Kingdom) Ian Grindrod	(United Kingdom) Vauxhall Astra GSI 16V	Report

== FIA 2-Litre World Rally Cup ==
Nº	Manufacturer	Points
1	(United States) General Motors Europe	74
2	(Czech Republic) Škoda	54
3	(France) Peugeot	38
4	(France) Citroën	26
5	(Russia) Lada	23
6	(France) Renault	19
7	(Japan) Toyota	15
8	Renault Argentina	10
9	Fiat Argentina	8
10	(Germany) Volkswagen	4
10	(Sweden) Saab	4
12	(Japan) Nissan	2
12	(Spain) SEAT	2
14	(Japan) Daihatsu	1
14	(East Germany) Wartburg	1

== See also ==
- 1993 FIA 2-Litre World Rally Cup at ewrc-results.com
