= Llandrindod Wells Victorian Festival =

Festival in the UK

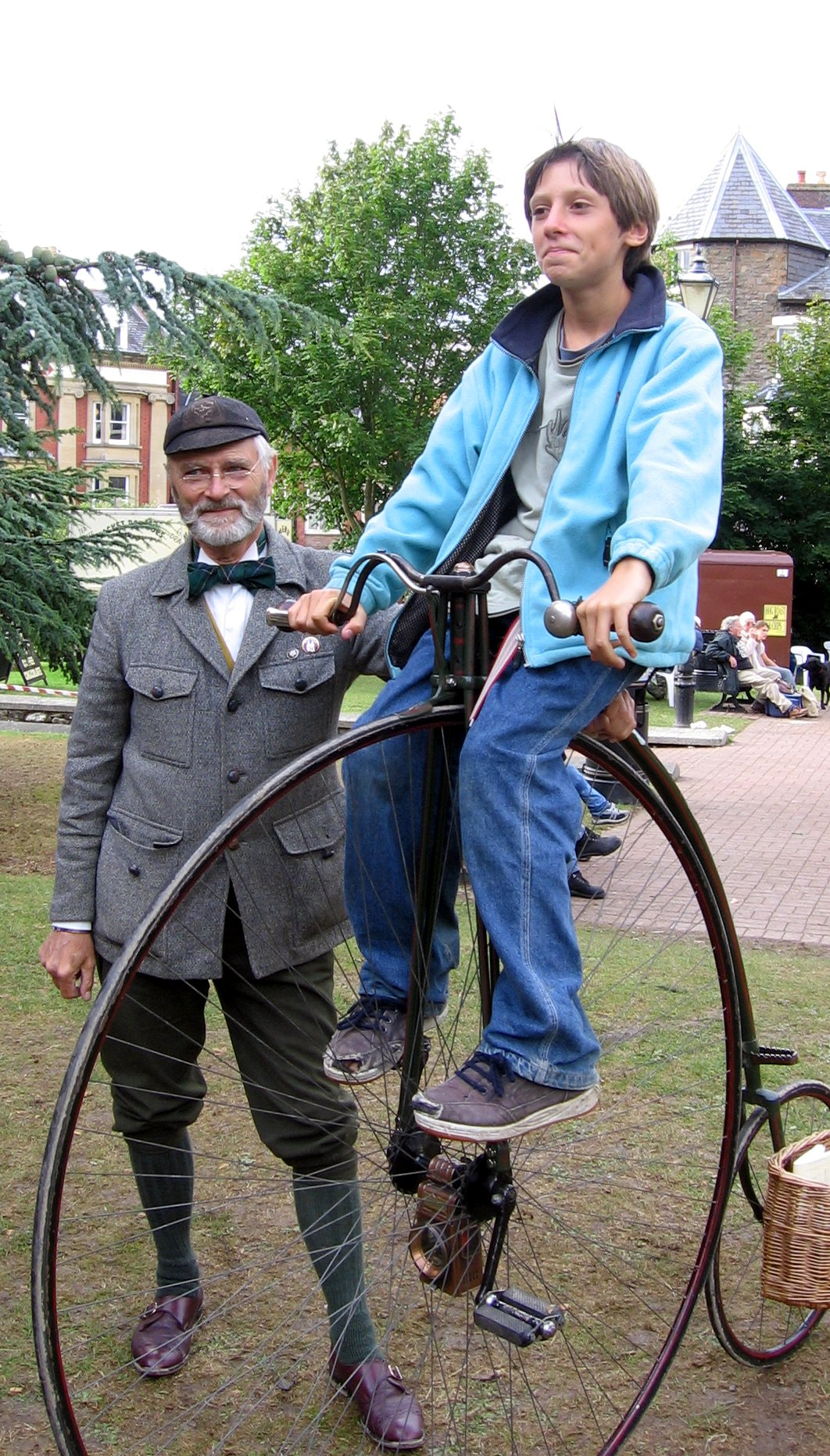
A penny-farthing at the Llandrindod Wells Victorian Festival

Llandrindod Wells Victorian Festival, known locally as Victorian Week, is a festival held annually at the end of August in Llandrindod Wells, Powys, central Wales. Many locals and some visitors dress in Victorian, Edwardian or other antique costumes, and many of the town's shops and other high-street businesses dress their windows or otherwise join in the spirit of the event. The event attracted some 40,000 people in 2007. The festival typically offers open-air and street theatre and music, a fairground, craft fair, historical re-enactment, entertainments at the Albert Hall and exhibitions of old items.
