= 1997 FIA 2-Litre World Rally Cup =

Auto racing championship

The 1997 FIA 2-Litre World Rally Cup was the fifth season of the FIA 2-Litre World Rally Cup, an auto racing championship recognized by the Fédération Internationale de l'Automobile, running in support of the World Rally Championship. SEAT defended the Manufacturers' Championship, with Harri Rovanperä taking the Drivers' Title.

== Season summary ==
Round	Event name	Winning driver	Winning co-driver	Winning car	Report
1	(Monaco) 65. Rallye Automobile de Monte-Carlo 1997	(Czech Republic) Emil Triner	(Czech Republic) Julius Gál	(Czech Republic) Škoda Felicia Kit Car	Report
2	(Sweden) 44. International Swedish Rally 1997	(Sweden) Jörgen Jonasson	(Sweden) Sten-Ove Olsson	(Germany) Volkswagen Golf III GTi 16V	Report
3	45. Safari Rally Kenya 1997	(Australia) Russell Palmer	(Australia) Brian Harwood	(Malaysia) Proton Satria	Report
4	31. TAP Rallye de Portugal 1997	(United Kingdom) Alister McRae	(United Kingdom) David Senior	(Germany) Volkswagen Golf III GTi 16V	Report
5	(Spain) 33. Rallye Catalunya Costa Brava - Rally de España 1997	(France) Gilles Panizzi	(France) Hervé Panizzi	(France) Peugeot 306 Maxi	Report
6	41. Tour de Corse - Rallye de France 1997	(France) Gilles Panizzi	(France) Hervé Panizzi	(France) Peugeot 306 Maxi	Report
7	17. Rally Argentina 1997	(Finland) Harri Rovanperä	(Finland) Voitto Silander	(Spain) Seat Ibiza Kit Car	Report
8	44. Acropolis Rally Greece 1997	(Spain) Oriol Gómez	(Spain) Marc Marti	(Spain) Seat Ibiza Kit Car Evo2	Report
9	28. Smokefree Rally New Zealand 1997	(Spain) Oriol Gómez	(Spain) Marc Marti	(Spain) Seat Ibiza Kit Car Evo2	Report
10	47. Neste Rally Finland 1997	(Finland) Harri Rovanperä	(Finland) Voitto Silander	(Spain) Seat Ibiza Kit Car Evo2	Report
11	22. Rally Indonesia 1997	(Finland) Harri Rovanperä	(Finland) Voitto Silander	(Spain) Seat Ibiza Kit Car Evo2	Report
12	(Italy) 39. Rally San Remo 1997	(Finland) Harri Rovanperä	(Finland) Voitto Silander	(Spain) Seat Ibiza Kit Car Evo2	Report
13	10. Rally Australia 1997	(Finland) Harri Rovanperä	(Finland) Voitto Silander	(Spain) Seat Ibiza Kit Car Evo2	Report
14	(United Kingdom) 53. Network Q RAC Rally 1997	(Finland) Harri Rovanperä	(Finland) Voitto Silander	(Spain) Seat Ibiza Kit Car Evo2	Report

== FIA 2-Litre World Rally Cup ==
Nº	Manufacturer	Points
1	(Spain) SEAT	101
2	(Czech Republic) Škoda	44
3	(France) Peugeot	39
4	(France) Renault	38
5	(Germany) Volkswagen	30
6	(South Korea) Hyundai	15
7	(Germany) Opel	14
8	(Malaysia) Proton	10
9	(South Korea) Daewoo	6
10	(South Korea) Daihatsu	5
10	(Japan) Honda	5
12	(Japan) Nissan	4
13	(United States) Ford	3
14	(Indonesia) Timor	1
14	(Japan) Toyota	1
14	(France) Citroen	1
14	(Japan) Kia	1

== See also ==
- 1997 FIA 2-Litre World Rally Cup at ewrc-results.com
