= D. E. Bowen =

Rev. Daniel E. Bowen was a 19th-century Welsh-American Baptist minister, serving in Pennsylvania. He was also an editor and author of Welsh-language periodicals.

He was born in Glamorganshire, Wales, and moved to Carbondale, Pennsylvania in 1841. In 1848, after a trip to New York state to raise funds, Bowen helped found the Berean Baptist Church in Carbondale. His brother, Rev. B. E. Bowan, was also a minister in Carbondale. He was well known as the editor of Y Gwyliedydd, the first periodical published by the Welsh Baptists in the United States in 1843, and Y Seren Orllewinol, which succeeded it the following year.

He also published The Berean; or Miscellaneous Writings of the Reverend D.E. Bowen, Carbondale, Pa. (Carbondale, n.d.); a Lecture on the Life and Genius of the Reverend John Williams, Senior Pastor of the Oliver Street Baptist Church, New York (New York, n.d.).
