= National Cycle Museum =

Bicycle museum in Wales, United Kingdom

Coordinates: 52.2385°N 3.3774°W

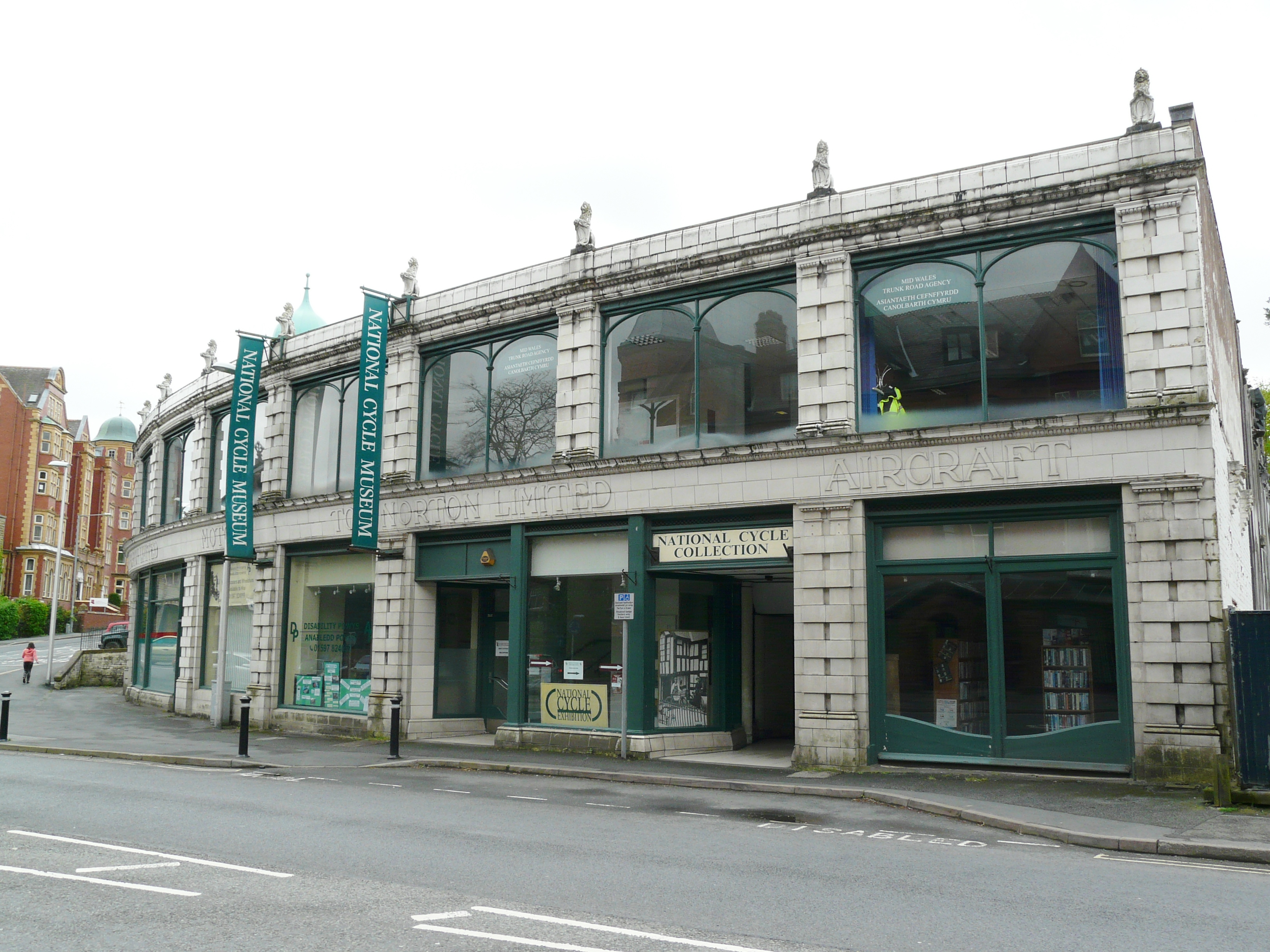
National Cycle Collection

The National Cycle Museum is a national museum dedicated to cycling in the United Kingdom and is based in Llandrindod Wells, Wales. It opened in 1997.

== History ==
The museum holds collection of bicycles through the ages, which was established in 1979 by Ray Fixter, in premises on the estate of Belton House, near Grantham. This collection opened to the public on 26 April 1980 as the Belton Cycle Museum. James Maynard, Edward Skeet and Anthony Pickering took on the running of the museum after the originator and curator, Raymond Fixter died in 1983. After the house was donated to the National Trust the museum was without premises until a new location at Lincoln was offered. The museum opened in Lincoln and the National Cycle Museum in 1984. The museum moved premises once more, to a second venue in Lincoln in 1994, before closing in 1996. In 1997 the Welsh Tourist board saw the opportunity of combining three collections (Tom Norton, David Higman and the National Cycle Museum) and offered premises in Llandrindod Wells, Powys.

The museum contains over 260 bicycles from an 1818 hobby-horse to the latest carbon-fibre designs, including a large collection of penny-farthings and solid-tyred safety bicycles, and cycling books, accessories and paraphernalia.

The building and site was known as The Automobile Palace, a project of bicycle shop owner Tom Norton, who bought the site in 1906 for his expanding business. The building was initially completed in 1911 in an Art Deco style and then tripled in size, to the same standard, in 1919. It has received a Grade II* heritage listing, being "an exceptionally early grid-pattern steel-framed building surviving largely unaltered".
