= 1994 FIA 2-Litre World Rally Cup =

Auto racing championship

The 1994 FIA 2-Litre World Rally Cup was the second season of the FIA 2-Litre World Rally Cup, an auto racing championship recognized by the Fédération Internationale de l'Automobile, running in support of the World Rally Championship. It was created for cars with engine size below 2 Litres. The championship was composed of eight rallies, and only manufacturers competed for championship.

General Motors Europe was the defending champion. Grégoire De Mévius became the Drivers' Champion, while Škoda took the Manufactuers' Title.

== Calendar ==
=== Season summary ===
Round	Event name	Winning driver	Winning co-driver	Winning car	Report
1	(Sweden) 43. International Swedish Rally 1994	(Sweden) Per Svan	(Sweden) Johan Olsson	(Germany) Opel Astra GSi 16V	Report
2	28. TAP Rallye de Portugal 1994	(Portugal) José Carlos Macedo	(Portugal) Miguel Borges	(France) Renault Clio Williams	Report
3	(Greece) 41. Acropolis Rally 1994	(Czech Republic) Emil Triner	(Czech Republic) Jiří Klíma	(Czech Republic) Škoda Favorit 136L	Report
4	(Finland) 44. Neste 1000 Lakes Rally 1994	(Belgium) Grégoire de Mévius	(Belgium) Willy Lux	(Germany) Opel Astra GSi 16V	Report
5	7. Telecom Rally Australia 1994	(Czech Republic) Pavel Sibera	(Czech Republic) Petr Gross	(Czech Republic) Škoda Favorit 136L	Report
6	(Italy) 36. Rallye Sanremo - Rallye d'Italia 1994	(United Kingdom) Alister McRae	(United Kingdom) David Senior	(Japan) Nissan Sunny GTi	Report
7	(Spain) 30. Rallye Catalunya - Costa Brava 1994	(Spain) Oriol Gómez Marco	(Spain) Marc Martí	(France) Renault Clio Williams	Report
8	(United Kingdom) 50. Network Q RAC Rally 1994	(United Kingdom) Gwyndaf Evans	(United Kingdom) Howard Davies	(United States) Ford Escort RS 2000	Report

=== FIA 2-Litre World Rally Cup ===
Nº	Manufacturer	Points
1	(Czech Republic) Škoda	43
2	(Japan) Nissan	40
3	(France) Renault	33
4	(Germany) Opel/Vauxhall	32
5	(France) Peugeot	18
6	(United States) Ford	10
7	(Germany) Volkswagen	10
8	(South Korea) Hyundai	10
9	(France) Citroën	8
10	(Spain) SEAT	7
