= Old Town Hall, Llandrindod Wells =

County Building in Llandrindod Wells, Wales

Old Town Hall
- Hen Neuadd y Dref Llandrindod (Welsh)
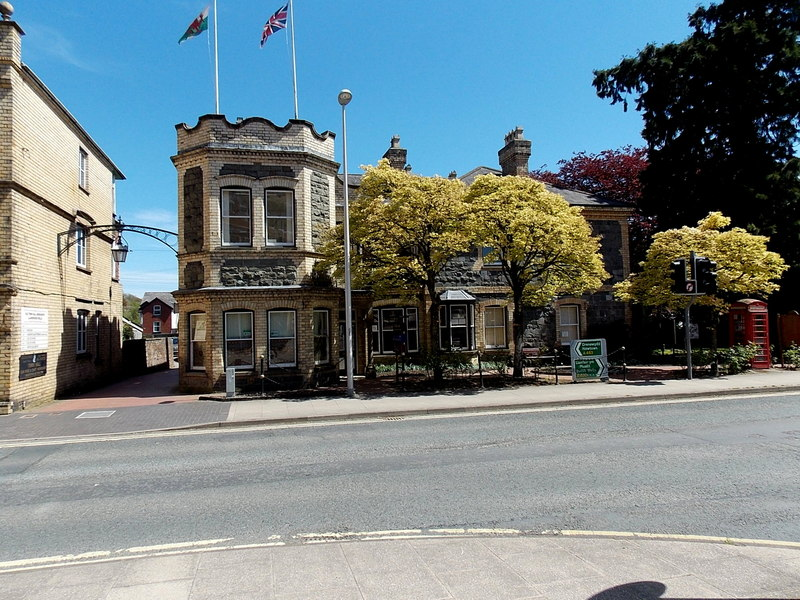
- Old Town Hall

- Shown in Powys
- 52.2407°N 3.3774°W
- Location: Temple Street, Llandrindod Wells

History
- Built: 1872

Site notes
- Architectural style: Victorian style

Listed Building – Grade II
- Official name: Brynarlais
- Designated: 9 June 2008
- Reference no.: 87569

The Old Town Hall (Welsh: Hen Neuadd y Dref Llandrindod) is a municipal building in Temple Street, Llandrindod Wells, Powys, Wales. The structure, which accommodates the offices of Llandrindod Wells Town Council, is a Grade II listed building.

== History ==
The building was commissioned by the first resident medical doctor in the town, William Bowen-Davies, for use as his private house, which he named "Brynarlais". Bowen-Davies went on to become an expert on the benefits of the mineral waters which were naturally available from the springs in the town. The house was designed in the Victorian style, built in a combination of yellow brick and rubble masonry and was completed in around 1872.

The design of the original building involved a symmetrical main frontage with three bays facing south; the ground floor, which was built in yellow brick, featured a central arched porch with voussoirs flanked by bay windows, while the first floor, which was built in rubble masonry, was fenestrated with a tall central sash window with an architrave flanked by standard-sized sash windows, also with architraves. The building was extended at the back, along Temple Street, in around 1890 to create additional accommodation for Bowen-Davies' surgery. The extension included a prominent two-storey canted bay which projected forward towards Temple Street and was surmounted by a castellated parapet; there was also an additional porch with columns supporting a modillioned canopy, providing access direct to the surgery.

Following significant population growth, largely associated with the large number of visitors to the local mineral water spas, the area became an urban district in 1894. In its early years the new urban district council rented various offices around the town for its staff. However, after the death of Bowen-Davies in April 1908, Brynarlais was marketed for sale and acquired by the urban district council in 1910. A council chamber and civic rooms were established in the extension at the back of the building.

A war memorial designed by Benjamin Lloyd, in the form of a soldier with his head bowed standing on a plinth, which was intended to commemorate the lives of local service personnel who had died in the First World War, was erected in a newly landscaped memorial garden in front of the original entrance to the town hall and unveiled by Lord Lieutenant of Radnorshire, Lord Ormathwaite, in July 1922.

The building continued to serve as the offices of the urban district council for much of the 20th century, but ceased to be the local seat of government when the enlarged Radnorshire District Council was formed in 1974. Instead, it accommodated the offices of several local businesses as well as the offices of Llandrindod Wells Town Council. A tourist information centre was also established in the building.
