= 1995 FIA 2-Litre World Rally Cup =

Auto racing championship

The 1995 FIA 2-Litre World Rally Cup was the third season of the FIA 2-Litre World Rally Cup, an auto racing championship recognized by the Fédération Internationale de l'Automobile, running in support of the World Rally Championship.

Škoda was the defending champion. Freddy Loix took the Drivers' Championship title while Peugeot claimed the Manufacturers' Title.

== Season summary ==
Round	Event name	Winning driver	Winning co-driver	Winning car	Report
1	(Monaco) 63. Rallye Automobile de Monte-Carlo 1995	(France) Jean Ragnotti	(France) Gilles Thimonier	(France) Renault Clio Maxi	Report
2	(Sweden) 44. International Swedish Rally 1995	(Sweden) Per Svan	(Sweden) Sten-Ove Olsson	(Germany) Opel Astra GSi 16V	Report
3	29. TAP Rallye de Portugal 1995	(Italy) Piergiorgio Deila	(Italy) Pierangelo Scalvini	(France) Peugeot 306 S16	Report
4	43. Safari Rally Kenya 1995	(Kenya) Azar Anwar	(Kenya) Shailen Shah	(South Korea) Daewoo Cielo	Report
5	39. Tour de Corse - Rallye de France 1995	(France) Jean Ragnotti	(France) Jean-Paul Chiaroni	(France) Renault Clio Maxi	Report
6	(Greece) 42. Acropolis Rally 1995	(Germany) Erwin Weber	(Germany) Manfred Hiemer	(Spain) Seat Ibiza GTi 16V	Report
6	15. Rally YPF Argentina 1995	(Czech Republic) Pavel Sibera	(Czech Republic) Petr Gross	(Czech Republic) Škoda Felicia Kit Car	Report
7	26. Smokefree Rally New Zealand 1995	(New Zealand) David Black	(New Zealand) Jane Black	(Japan) Toyota Corolla GT	Report
8	(Finland) 45. Neste 1000 Lakes Rally 1995	(Finland) Jarmo Kytölehto	(Finland) Arto Kapanen	(Germany) Opel Astra GSi 16V	Report
9	(Italy) 37. Rallye Sanremo - Rallye d'Italia 1995	(Belgium) Freddy Loix	(Belgium) Sven Smeets	(Germany) Opel Astra GSi 16V	Report

== FIA 2-Litre World Rally Cup ==
Nº	Manufacturer	Points
1	(France) Peugeot	257
2	(France) Renault	227
3	(Czech Republic) Škoda	174
4	(Japan) Suzuki	75
5	(Japan) Toyota	63
6	Renault Argentina	45
7	(South Korea) Daewoo	35
7	(Japan) Honda	35
