= 1996 FIA 2-Litre World Rally Cup =

Auto racing championship

The 1996 FIA 2-Litre World Rally Cup was the fourth season of the FIA 2-Litre World Rally Cup, an auto racing championship recognized by the Fédération Internationale de l'Automobile, running in support of the World Rally Championship. Peugeot entered as the defending Champion. The Driver's Title went to Jesús Puras as the Manufacturers' Championship was taken by SEAT.

== Season summary ==
Round	Event name	Winning driver	Winning co-driver	Winning car	Report
1	(Monaco) 64. Rallye Automobile de Monte-Carlo 1996	(France) François Delecour	(France) Hervé Sauvage	(France) Peugeot 306 Maxi	Report
2	30. TAP Rallye de Portugal 1996	(Spain) Jesús Puras	(Spain) Carlos Del Barrio	(Spain) Seat Ibiza GTi 16V	Report
3	40. Tour de Corse - Rallye de France 1996	(France) Philippe Bugalski	(France) Jean-Paul Chiaroni	(France) Renault Mégane Maxi	Report
4	16. Rally Argentina 1996	(Argentina) Gabriel Raies	(Argentina) Jose Maria Volta	(France) Renault Clio Williams	Report
5	27. Smokefree Rally New Zealand 1996	(Czech Republic) Emil Triner	(Czech Republic) Pavel Štanc	(Czech Republic) Škoda Felicia Kit Car	Report
6	9. Rally Australia 1996	(Czech Republic) Pavel Sibera	(Czech Republic) Petr Gross	(Czech Republic) Škoda Felicia Kit Car	Report
7	(Spain) 32. Rallye Catalunya Costa Brava - Rally de España 1996	(Spain) Oriol Gómez Marco	(Spain) Marc Martí	(France) Renault Mégane Maxi	Report
8	(United Kingdom) 52. Network Q RAC Rally 1996	(Sweden) Stig Blomqvist	(Sweden) Benny Melander	(Czech Republic) Škoda Felicia Kit Car	Report

== FIA 2-Litre World Rally Cup ==
Nº	Manufacturer	Points
1	(Spain) SEAT	274
2	(France) Renault	265
3	(Czech Republic) Škoda	264
4	(France) Peugeot	168
5	(United States) General Motors Europe	103
6	(Japan) Suzuki	52
7	(South Korea) Hyundai	52
8	(Japan) Daihatsu	50
9	(Japan) Honda	43
10	(Japan) Nissan	42

== See also ==
- 1996 FIA 2-Litre World Rally Cup at ewrc-results.com
