= Llandrindod Wells =

Town in Powys, Wales

Llandrindod Wells: Welsh: Llandrindod
- Town
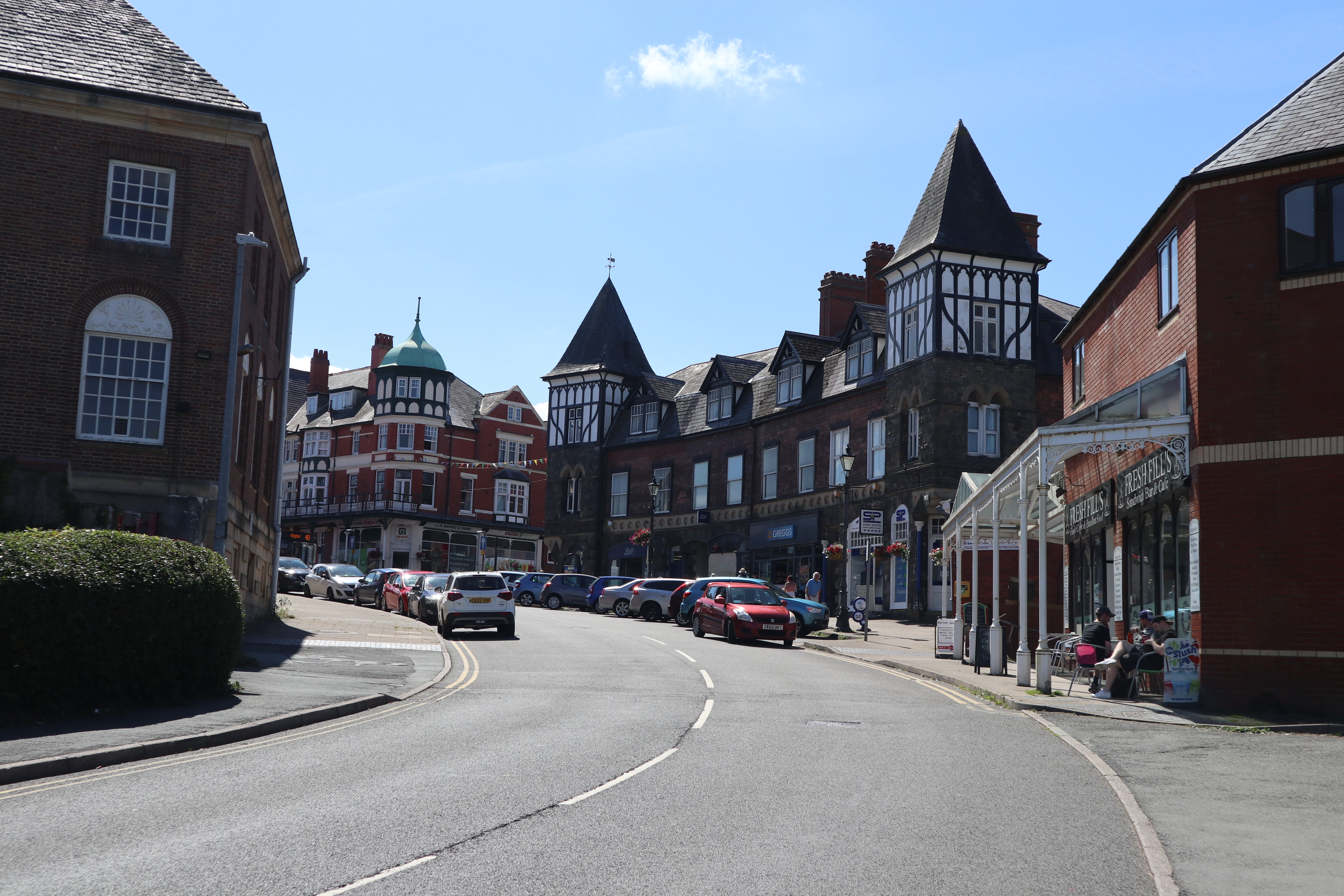
- Llandrindod Wells Town

- Location within Powys
- Population: 5,602 (2011)
- OS grid reference: SO055615
- Community: Llandrindod Wells
- Principal area: Powys
- Preserved county: Powys
- Country: Wales
- Sovereign state: United Kingdom
- Post town: LLANDRINDOD WELLS
- Postcode district: LD1
- Dialling code: 01597
- Police: Dyfed-Powys
- Fire: Mid and West Wales
- Ambulance: Welsh
- UK Parliament: Brecon, Radnor and Cwm Tawe
- Senedd Cymru – Welsh Parliament: Brycheiniog Tawe Nedd
- Website: www.llandrindod.co.uk
- List of places UK Wales Powys 52.24354°N 3.38547°W Community map: Map of the community

Llandrindod Wells (/lænˌdrɪndɒd ˈwɛlz/; locally /ɬænˌdrɪndɒd-/; Welsh: Llandrindod [ɬanˈdɾindɔd]; lit. 'trinity parish') is a town and community in Powys, Wales. It serves as the seat of Powys County Council, and is therefore the administrative centre of Powys. The town was historically in Radnorshire.

Llandrindod Wells developed as a spa town in the 19th century, with a boom in the late 20th century as a centre of local government. Before the 1860s the site of the town was common land in Llanfihangel Cefnllys parish. Llandrindod Wells is the fifth largest town in Powys. The population as of the 2021 UK census was 5,602, an increase on the previous census.

== History ==
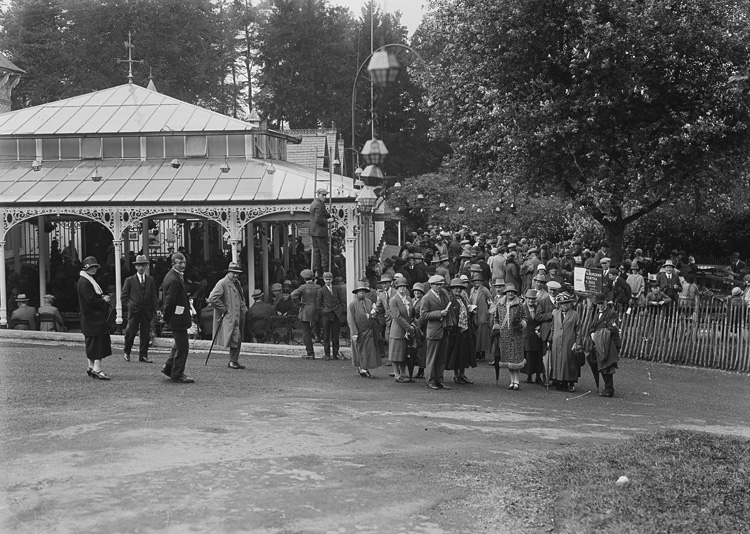
A gathering of people at the Rock Park Pump House, Llandrindod, 1920s

During the mid-18th century, the 'healing qualities' of the local spring waters attracted visitors to the area resulting in an economic boom with the building of a 'splendid' hotel at Llandrindod Hall. The medicinal qualities of the springs was first described in detail by the self-proclaimed physician Diederich Wessel Linden.

The most famous of the springs was Cwmygof Well, in the rocky valley of Dolysgallog Farm. The farm became a boarding house in the 1820s to accommodate the growing numbers of visitors. Later, the area of land which was to become 'Rock Park' was set aside for exercise and recreation.

A period of relative decline during the late 18th and early 19th centuries was reversed with the construction of the Heart of Wales line making Llandrindod accessible from south Wales, the Midlands and northwest England. Enclosure of the common in 1862 enabled the expansion of the town with the construction of new streets, hotels, shops and houses.

During the 'season' between May and mid-September, visitors would take the waters at the pump rooms at the Rock Park and Pump House Hotel, entertained by orchestras. Hotels, boarding houses and shops—including the Central Wales Emporium on the corner of Temple Street and Station Crescent—provided for the visitors. In the early 1870s, an ornamental lake was formed by draining marshland near the Pump House Hotel (on the current site of the Council offices), and in 1893 a 9-hole golf course was opened on the common beside the lake (later replaced by the present 18-hole course on the hills above). Horse races (and later air displays) were held on the Rock Ddole meadow beside the river.

In 1893, Archdeacon Henry de Winton, who had responsibility for the area at the time, had Llandrindod old church and Cefnllys church unroofed in order to persuade the congregations to attend the new church in the centre of the town. Both churches were later restored in 1895 following protest.

Llandrindod was the place of the election of the first Archbishop of Wales in 1920, which occurred at the Old Parish Church. Elections for every Archbishop since have continued to be held in Llandrindod, now at Holy Trinity Church in the Town Centre. In 1907, a Catholic church was founded in the town, Our Lady of Ransom and the Holy Souls Church.

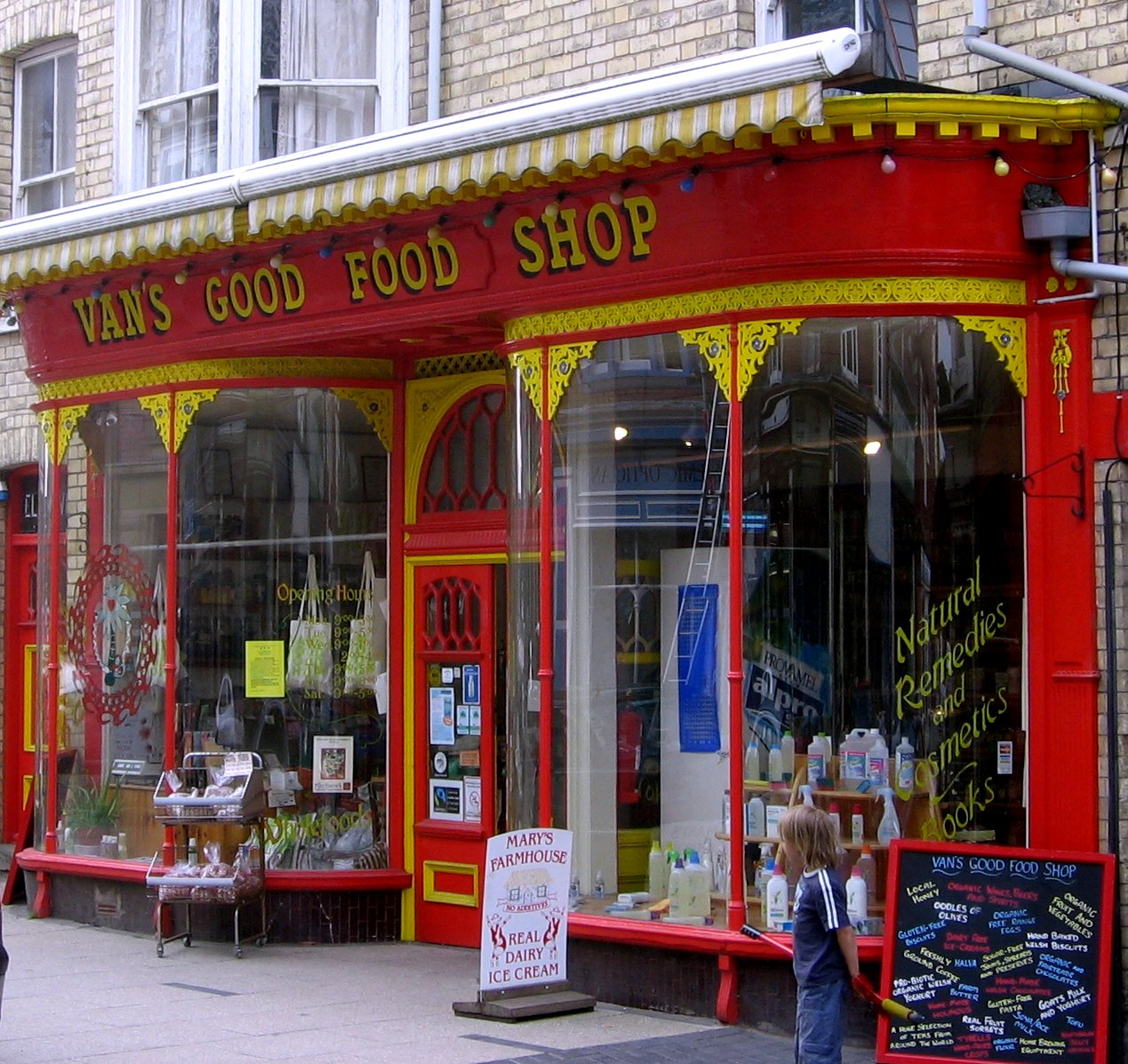
Vans Good Food Shop, an example of the style of shops of Llandrindod's Victorian heyday

The town has maintained an important profile in the world of motoring and motorsport. Apart from two of its most symbolic recent buildings being the Tom Norton's Automobile Palace and Pritchard's Garage, it served as the base for many International motorcycle events such as the International Six Days Trial ISDT starting in 1933 with the last visit taking place in 1961, often drawing in crowds of thousands to watch.

The town's boom continued until the First World War during which time soldiers on training courses were billeted in hotels and boarding houses, and refugees and wounded soldiers were accommodated in the town. The Great Depression of the late-1920s and 1930s led to many hotels and boarding houses being turned into private homes and flats. During the Second World War the town was again used for military hospitals and billets, followed by a slump in the post-war years. The Beeching Axe resulted in the closure in the mid-1960s of the Mid-Wales line and with it Llandrindod's connection from nearby Builth Wells direct to Cardiff and to north and west Wales. The town does retain connections to Swansea and Shrewsbury from Llandrindod railway station on the Heart of Wales line.

Prior to 1974, the town housed much of the administration of Radnorshire, although the official county town was Presteigne. The reorganisation of local government in 1974 resulted in Llandrindod becoming the county town of the newly formed administrative county of Powys. This led to an influx of people employed by the new bureaucracies, on salaries determined by national pay scales. The new County Hall was based on Spa Road East in Llandrindod Wells.

== Welsh language ==
Llandrindod was a mainly Welsh-speaking town until the 19th century, when the language suffered a decline.

Visiting in August 1760, visitor Lewis Morris from Ynys Môn wrote "The country people talk English here as well as Welsh...though Welsh is more natural to them, and is as pure and correct as in north Wales, some local words excepted."

By 1827, there were already fears for the future of the language in the area. In 1827 a correspondent for y Gwyliedydd praised the Radnorshire dialect of Welsh, but said that young people only spoke English.

As of the 2021 census, 10.8% of the population of the town can speak Welsh.

== Climate ==
Climate data for Llandrindod Wells (1991–2020)
Month	Jan	Feb	Mar	Apr	May	Jun	Jul	Aug	Sep	Oct	Nov	Dec	Year
Record high °C (°F)	13.9 (57.0)	15.6 (60.1)	21.7 (71.1)	20.6 (69.1)	25.6 (78.1)	26.7 (80.1)	28.9 (84.0)	27.4 (81.3)	26.1 (79.0)	23.3 (73.9)	15.0 (59.0)	12.4 (54.3)	28.9 (84.0)
Mean daily maximum °C (°F)	6.8 (44.2)	7.4 (45.3)	10.1 (50.2)	13.2 (55.8)	16.5 (61.7)	19.1 (66.4)	20.8 (69.4)	20.3 (68.5)	17.6 (63.7)	13.6 (56.5)	9.6 (49.3)	7.4 (45.3)	13.6 (56.5)
Daily mean °C (°F)	4.0 (39.2)	4.2 (39.6)	6.1 (43.0)	8.4 (47.1)	11.5 (52.7)	14.2 (57.6)	15.9 (60.6)	15.5 (59.9)	13.2 (55.8)	10.0 (50.0)	6.6 (43.9)	4.4 (39.9)	9.5 (49.1)
Mean daily minimum °C (°F)	1.2 (34.2)	1.0 (33.8)	2.0 (35.6)	3.6 (38.5)	6.4 (43.5)	9.4 (48.9)	11.0 (51.8)	10.8 (51.4)	8.7 (47.7)	6.4 (43.5)	3.6 (38.5)	1.5 (34.7)	5.5 (41.9)
Record low °C (°F)	−17.2 (1.0)	−15.6 (3.9)	−13.9 (7.0)	−5.6 (21.9)	−2.8 (27.0)	−0.6 (30.9)	1.1 (34.0)	0.0 (32.0)	−2.2 (28.0)	−5.0 (23.0)	−7.2 (19.0)	−13.9 (7.0)	−17.2 (1.0)
Average precipitation mm (inches)	110.9 (4.37)	94.2 (3.71)	76.8 (3.02)	62.1 (2.44)	76.3 (3.00)	68.2 (2.69)	70.1 (2.76)	81.1 (3.19)	77.5 (3.05)	117.7 (4.63)	124.2 (4.89)	137.1 (5.40)	1,096.1 (43.15)
Average precipitation days (≥ 1.0 mm)	16.4	12.8	13.6	12.3	11.3	11.7	10.5	11.8	11.9	15.2	16.2	15.8	159.3
Mean monthly sunshine hours	38.8	60.8	100.7	146.8	171.5	162.8	160.1	162.9	114.9	79.1	46.9	34.0	1,279.4
Source 1: Met Office (precipitation days 1981-2010)
Source 2: Starlings Roost Weather

== Governance ==
Three county electoral wards lie within the boundaries of the town which each elect a councillor to Powys County Council: Llandrindod East/West, Llandrindod North and Llandrindod South.

Llandrindod Town Council is responsible for the provision, upkeep and maintenance of a number of public spaces and services. Llandrindod Wells Town Council has up to 15 town councillors (elected from five community wards).

== Notable landmarks ==
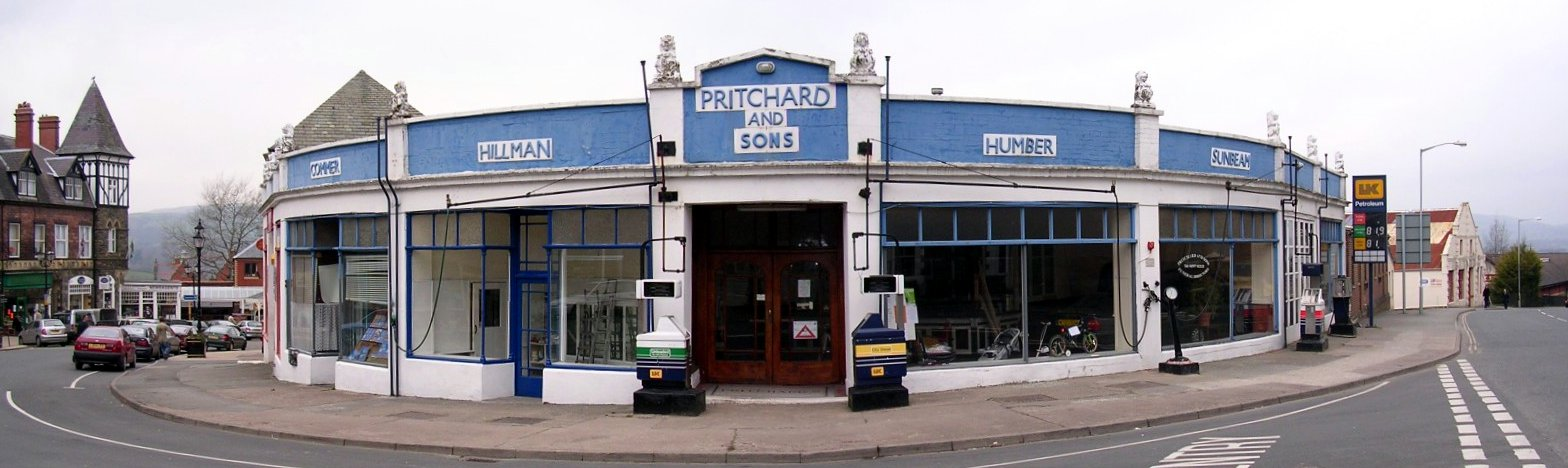
Pritchard's garage

The architecture of the town includes many buildings in ornate styles dating from the boom period of the Victorian and Edwardian eras including the Metropole, the Glen Usk and the Gwalia hotels, The Albert Hall, and Llandrindod railway station which built in 1865. The Old Town Hall, which was originally commissioned as a doctor's home and surgery, was completed in 1872.

There are also buildings in the Art Deco style including two former garages, Pritchard's and the Automobile Palace. The latter was notable for a collection of antique bicycles which were displayed suspended from ceilings in the building. The building has in recent years been renovated and is now home to several small businesses and the National Cycle Collection, featuring some of the bicycles originally displayed in the garage.

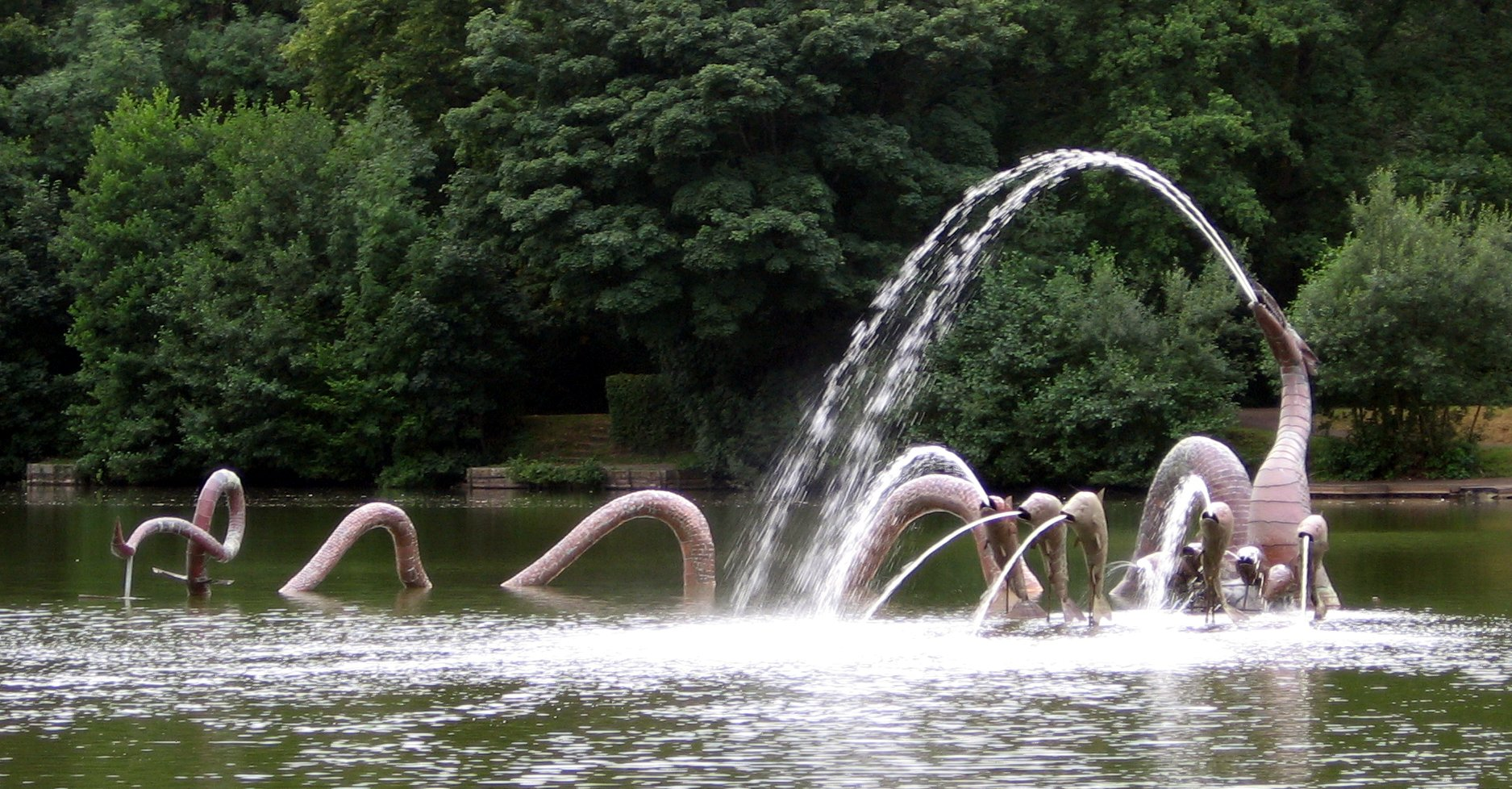
Water-sculpture on the lake

A large man-made lake in the town is used for fishing and model boating. The lake houses a sculpture of a water serpent and leaping carp, the scales of which are made of thousands of copper plates initialed by local people and visitors during construction of the work. Beside the lake, sits a distinctive tree-trunk sculpture known as a 'Llandoddie', one of many such sculptures distributed throughout the town. In May 2018, pedalo boats for hire were launched onto Llandrindod Lake, as part of a £158,000 regeneration project. Llandrindod Wells' parks are listed, as a collective, on the Cadw/ICOMOS Register of Parks and Gardens of Special Historic Interest in Wales. The Grade II* listing reflects the parks' significant role in the "development of Llandrindod Wells as a flourishing spa town".

An 18-hole golf course, which features challenging topology and views over the lake, was established in 1905.

The town has three international standard outdoor bowling greens dating from 1912 which hosts national and international events and has recently been voted ‘the best facilities in the whole of the British Isles’. A newer indoor bowling centre, can also be found in the centre of the town.

Llandrindod Wells County War Memorial Hospital was opened in 1881.

== Culture ==
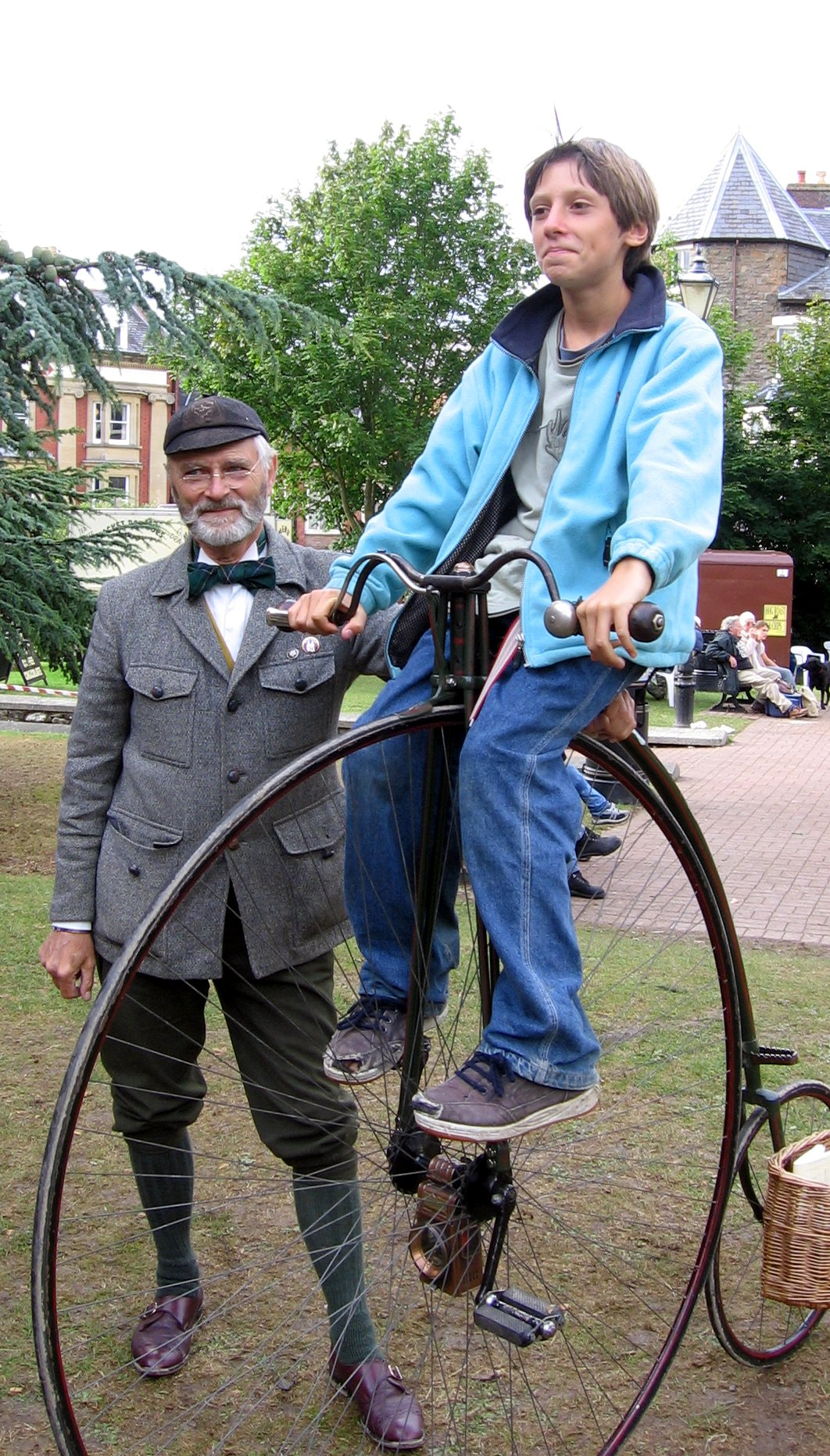
A penny-farthing at the Llandrindod Wells Victorian Festival, 2005

Llandrindod Wells Victorian Festival is held in the town every year at the end of August. Many locals and some visitors dress in Victorian, Edwardian or other antique costumes, and many of the town's shops and other high-street businesses dress their windows or otherwise join in the spirit of the event. The festival typically offers open-air and street theatre and music, a fairground, a craft fair, an historical re-enactment, entertainments at The Albert Hall and exhibitions of "things old-time".

In a 2017 survey undertaken by Rightmove, Llandrindod was voted the Happiest Place in Wales. A survey by the Royal Mail over the Easter 2018 period showed that Llandrindod had the highest online shopping rates for that period in the whole of the country.

There is a wide range of entertainment available in the town each year. The Albert Hall, Llandrindod Wells is the town's Victorian Theatre, owned and run by the community of Llandrindod. The Theatre is managed by a group of volunteers from the local area. The theatre hosts a wide range of performances and activities suitable for all. Many local organisation's events are held at the Theatre.

Pavilion Mid Wales (formerly known as The Grand Pavilion) is the largest venue in Llandrindod Wells, and hosts a wide range of entertainments, including Arts, Music, Conferences, and Markets.

The town hosts annual Welsh 2 Day Enduro in June. The enduro started in 1952, and is the UK's biggest time card motorcycle Enduro event. The event covers 300 miles, over 2 days, with 500 competitors.

A typical year of events within the town looks like this:

Month	Event/s
January	LWTC Pantomime, Wassailing
February	YFC Drama Week
March	
April	
May	
June	Welsh Two Day Enduro
July	Carnival
August	Llandrindod Wells Victorian Festival and Firework Display
September	
October	
November	Ysgol Trefonnen Fireworks Display
December	The Albert Hall Christmas Singalong, School Christmas Fayres, Muddy Santa.
Monthly	Artisan Market, Repair Cafe, Craft Market, Carboot Sales

== Education ==
Llandrindod has two primary schools and one secondary school:

- Llandrindod Wells CP School – Cefnllys (Ysgol Cefnllys) is an English Medium Local Authority Primary school. Llandrindod Wells Church in Wales School – Ysgol Trefonnen is an English and Welsh Medium Local Authority Primary School.
- Ysgol Calon Cymru is the town's Local Authority secondary school. The school has two campuses, which replaced the former Llandrindod High School (and Builth Wells High School) and opened in September 2018. The Llandrindod site provides an English-medium education for 11 to 18 year olds.

== Notable people ==
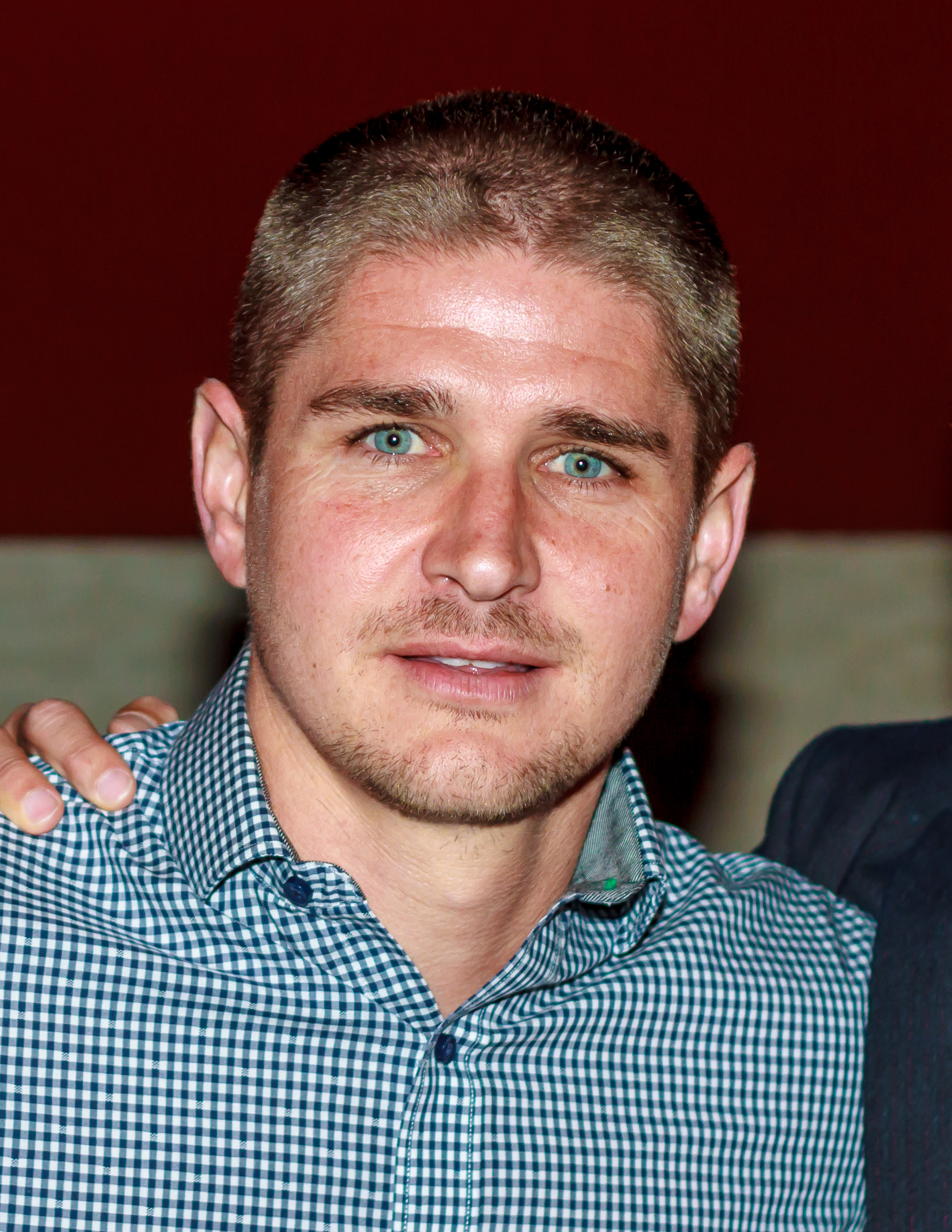
Carl Robinson, 2015

- Curigwen Lewis (1905–1992), an actress of stage and screen
- Betty Morgan (born 1942), an international lawn and indoor bowler
- Percy Jones (born 1947), a bass guitarist, a member of the jazz fusion ensemble Brand X
- Mark Layton (born 1957), a darts player with the World Darts Federation, lives in the town
- Kirsty Wade (born 1962), former middle-distance runner, three-time Commonwealth Games gold medallist
- Carl Robinson (born 1976), a retired footballer with 406 club appearances and 52 caps for Wales
- Tom Cullen (born 1985), actor, grew up in the town
- Dan Lydiate (born 1987), a Wales rugby union player with 84 caps for Wales

== Twinning ==
Llandrindod Wells is twinned with:

- Bad Rappenau in Germany
- Contrexéville in France

Llandrindod Wells Twinning Association host annual trips to and from the Twinned towns.
