= The Albert Hall, Llandrindod Wells =

Victorian theatre and community venue

The Albert Hall
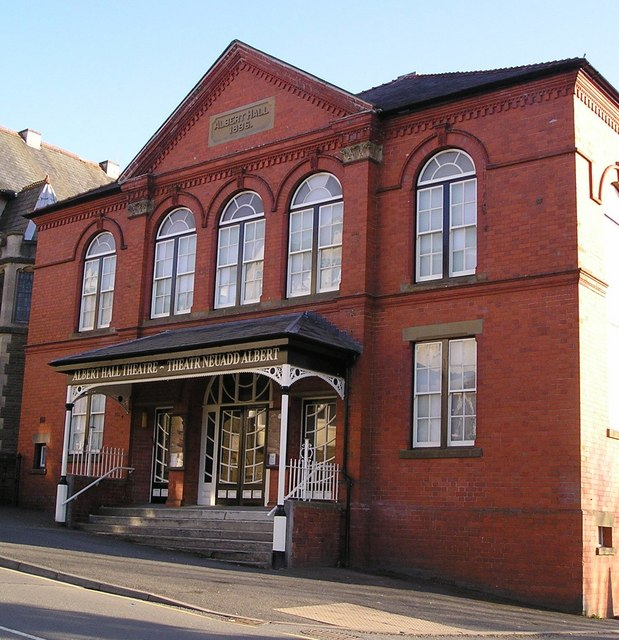
- Exterior view of The Albert Hall, Llandrindod Wells
- Interactive map of The Albert Hall
- Full name: The Albert Hall, Llandrindod Wells
- Former names: Albert Hall Theatre; Albert Hall
- Address: Ithon Road; Llandrindod Wells, Powys, LD1 6AS; Wales
- Location: Llandrindod Wells; Powys; Wales
- Coordinates: 52°14′24″N 3°23′01″W
- Owner: Llandrindod Wells Community
- Operator: The Albert Hall Management Committee
- Seating type: Fixed
- Capacity: 454
- Type: Church hall (1896–1922); Theatre / Concert Hall (1923–present); Cinema (1923–1929, 2022–present); Community Building (1923–present)
- Events: Theatre, Cinema, Music, Community
- Current use: Theatre, Cinema, Community

Construction
- Groundbreaking: 1895
- Built: 1896
- Opened: 1896; 130 years ago as Church Hall; 20 July 1923; 103 years ago as Theatre
- Renovated: 1922-23 (Conversion from Church Hall to Theatre); 1973 (Major Improvements); 2021 (Major Improvements)
- Cost: £2000
- Architect: Owen Morris Roberts

Website
- thealberthall.co.uk

The Albert Hall is a period Victorian theatre and community venue in Llandrindod Wells in Powys, Wales. Originally built as a church hall in 1896, it became a theatre in 1922, with the addition of an art-deco foyer. The exterior of the building, foyer and auditorium remain to this day much as they were then.

The town bought the theatre as a community space in 1961. It was Grade II listed in 1985. The early history of building and maintaining the Albert Hall was inextricably bound up with the Ithon Road Presbyterian Church, and it is a tribute to the labour of the small membership of the church (approximately 100).

== History ==
=== 1890s ===
Llandrindod Wells boomed in the late 1800s, when 80,000 to 90,000 visitors came to Llandrindod each year for spa treatment. Many of these people were Welsh speakers and wanted to attend a Welsh church service. The Presbyterian church needed a place to host Welsh language services and social events, near the main church. They employed Owen Morris Roberts to draw up the plans for a church hall, and church members started fund-raising. The Albert Hall was completed in 1896 at a total cost of £2,000. It consisted of a large "hall" space with seating for 750 people, a small stage for choirs, and a small balcony with wooden seating.

Edward Jenkins, manager of the Gwalia Hotel in the town and a member of the church, suggested that it be named The Albert Hall, since it was around the corner from the Gwalia Hotel in Llandrindod Wells, just as the Royal Albert Hall in London was around the corner from London's Gwalia Hotel.

=== 1905 ===
In the early 1900s, the church members decided it was time to rebuild and extend the adjoining Presbyterian church. During the construction, church services were held in The Albert Hall. As part of the works, part of The Albert Hall's basement was converted into a church schoolroom, and the original church pulpit was relocated there. The church and schoolroom opened in 1905.

=== 1914 ===
During the First World War, the Royal Army Medical Corps (RAMC) accommodated an impressive contingent of 4,000 men in Llandrindod Wells for their training purposes. The soldiers made good use of the local Hall, organising various events and entertainment to boost morale during their time there. Furthermore, Llandrindod hosted its second annual eisteddfod in March 1915, a cultural festival celebrating music and poetry, at The Albert Hall, showcasing the town's vibrant community spirit even amidst the challenges of wartime.

=== 1922 ===
Following the conclusion of the war, there was a noticeable decline in church attendance, rendering the hall redundant and prompting the committee to explore new avenues for community utility. After deliberation, they concluded that transforming the space into a theatre and cinema would greatly benefit the town. Consequently, in 1922, the Albert Hall underwent a significant transformation, repurposed to serve as both a theatre and cinema. An elegant foyer adorned with intricate Art Nouveau detailing was designed by Owen Morris Roberts & Son, adding a touch of sophistication to the venue. Remarkably, the exterior of the building, as well as the foyer and auditorium, has been preserved and remains largely unchanged to this day. The grand reopening took place on 20th July 1923 at 15:00, during which local residents were graciously invited for tea to witness the exquisite improvements made to the establishment.

=== 1929 ===
With the arrival of "talkies" – films featuring sound – in 1929, the Albert Hall ceased its operations as a cinema. The church donated the silent film projector to Bronllys sanatorium.

During this time, the Llandrindod Wells Drama Festival was inaugurated. The week-long event ran annually (except during the war years) until 2013. Nevertheless, apart from this, the Albert Hall, similar to the town itself, faced a downturn in its fortunes

=== 1939 ===
During the Second World War, Llandrindod once more served as a training centre for thousands of soldiers. With lectures during the day and entertainment each evening, the Albert Hall was fully utilised again. Many of the servicemen who performed on stage would later achieve fame. However, as the troops returned home at the conclusion of the war, the audiences began to decline.

=== 1950s ===
The church continued to conduct Welsh services at the Albert Hall until 1951. The premises then changed hands in 1958, when the local business, Campbell & Edwards, acquired it for use as an auction house.

=== 1962 ===
In 1962, the residents of Llandrindod Wells purchased the Albert Hall for £2,000. A management committee, made up of representatives from local organisations, would oversee the theatre. The community collected additional funds; however, the required repairs and operational expenses consumed the majority of their contributions.

=== 1970 ===
Through collaboration with the Arts Council of Wales, the committee devised a scheme to upgrade the Albert Hall. With a projected budget of £20,000, fundraising efforts were reinstated to secure vital funding.

=== 1973 ===
In 1973, the Friends of the Albert Hall charity was established, successfully garnering over £1,000 in contributions from local businesses and institutions. The committee subsequently engaged with the local authorities and organisations, and through collective efforts, the necessary funds were raised. As part of the overhaul, the facilities benefited from a central heating system, rewired electrics, a fresh coat of paint and decorative enhancements. Technical upgrades, fire safety measures, and a new entrance canopy were also included in the comprehensive improvements.

=== 1982 ===
The local theatre company acquired responsibility for managing the premises. In 1985, Albert Hall gained Grade II listed status to safeguard the building's preservation and protection. Occasional events featured a seasonal panto, the annual drama festival, and agricultural competitions run by Young Farmers. A bar was established between the kitchen and Lesser Hall, licensed to serve alcoholic beverages to the audience.

=== 2007 ===
A restoration project costing £115,000 commenced, which involved the installation of a new roof. It received backing from the Heritage Lottery Fund, the European Union, and various other sponsors.

=== 2010s ===
In the early 2010s, it was decided that the management of the theatre should return to a management committee. Shortly thereafter, the Albert Hall Management Committee was re-formed. The theatre was registered as a charity (charity number 524464).

Since that time, the theatre has seen additional enhancements. The original asbestos was removed and the curtains were replaced in 2016. A new heating system was fitted in 2019, alongside upgraded electrical systems.

=== 2020–2024 ===
In March 2020, a new management committee took charge of the Albert Hall, but regrettably, just a fortnight later, the venue was closed owing to the Covid-19 pandemic. The Albert Hall participated in initiatives like LightItInRed and WeMakeEvents, joining forces with numerous venues and production companies globally that were left without support during this time. The new committee aims to restore the hall to its original purpose of providing a space for local community groups. Throughout 2020 and early 2021, maintenance work was carried out, thanks to the generous contributions of local residents, Ah Friends, committee members, the Arts Council of Wales (ACW), and Theatres Trust. Facilities such as toilets and dressing rooms were refurbished, alongside various smaller repair tasks that often went unnoticed.

The Albert Hall finally reopened on 10 July 2021, 476 days, or 68 weeks, after its closure due to the pandemic. Funding from ACW allowed for the installation of new flooring in the auditorium later in 2021. At the end of that year, the Albert Hall Management Committee was informed by The National Lottery Community Fund of receiving substantial grant funding to develop an "Accessible Cinema", which involved a complete upgrade of the theatre's sound system and the installation of a projection system with a large screen, returning the hall to its cinematic roots with a contemporary flair for accessibility.

In 2022, the stage rigging was entirely re-strung after nearly four decades without inspection—an oversight as these checks should be conducted annually. This action, coupled with regular inspections, will help mitigate the risk of accidents and ensure safety. Additionally, funding from Tesco's Community Grants scheme allowed for the replacement of outdated tables in the lesser hall and the installation of a sound system. The first half of the year also saw the achievement of several sustainability targets, including replacing halogen bulbs with LED options, reducing paper waste (by eliminating single-use menus from the bar), and switching to a waste collection service that separates recyclables from rubbish.

In 2023, the Albert Hall celebrated the centenary of its transformation into a theatre.

At the start of 2024, we learned that the Albert Hall was granted significant funding from Arts Council Wales and the Welsh Government to install a state-of-the-art LED stage lighting system, along with a hearing support and audio description system, one of only a few dedicated setups in theatres across Wales. The installation work was completed in the spring.

== Present day ==
Today, The Albert Hall is once again a thriving venue, and community building. The trustees are committed to providing a suitable community space for the town, and bringing entertainment to the local area. In recent years, the quality of the acts has increased, leading the even bigger acts arriving in the town, such as The Shires, The Drifters, and Only Men Aloud.

== Notable appearances ==
Throughout its history, many famous faces have appeared at The Albert Hall, including:

- Charles III
- The Drifters
- Only Men Aloud
- John Challis
- The Shires
- Andy Bell
- Kaleb Cooper
- Wynne Evans
