= FIA 2-Litre World Rally Cup =

Sub-section of the World Rally Championship from 1993 to 1999

- Category: F2 Kit Car
- Country: International
- Inaugural season: 1993
- Folded: 1999

The FIA 2-Litre World Rally Cup was a sub-section of the World Rally Championship from 1993 to 1999. It involved mostly 1,600 cc (97.6 cu in) or 2,000 cc (122.0 cu in), naturally aspirated, front wheel drive cars. The series was discontinued due to high costs, and the new Super 2000 class was amalgamated into the Production World Rally Championship, whilst the 1600cc cars were generally modified for usage in the Super 1600 class, which formed the basis of the Junior World Rally Championship in 2001. The most successful manufacturer was SEAT, who won the title three times in a row with their SEAT Ibiza Kit Car.

As the 1990s progressed the 2 litre cars proved to be exceptional tarmac rally cars. With more engine freedoms and lighter weights they could match, even beat the turbo 4WD Group A and WRC cars. In particular the kit cars built by the French manufacturers Peugeot and Citroën would prove real threats on the Tour de Corse each year as increasingly they become more like circuit racing cars and less like all-terrain rally cars. With the French Rally Championship increasingly being held on tarmac only events the Peugeot 306 Maxis and Citroën Xsara Kit Cars would become optimised for the domestic and European championships leaving them less competition in World Rally events held on snow or gravel events. Their ability to snatch wins away from WRC teams became a launching pad into World championship careers, led by Gilles Panizzi and Philippe Bugalski and later emerging French talent Sébastien Loeb.

== History ==
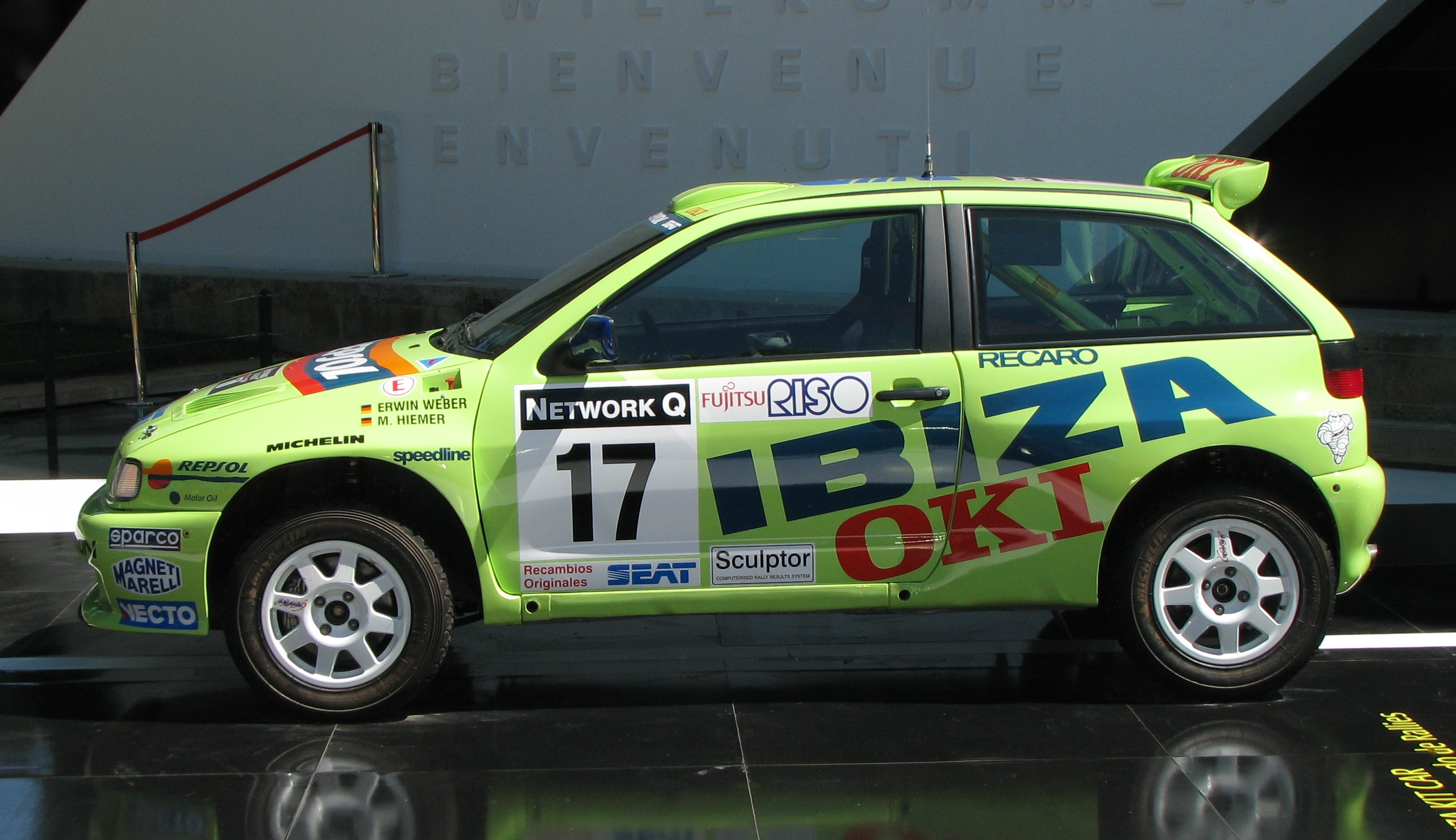
The SEAT Ibiza Kit Car was the most successful car in the series, taking 3 titles in a row, from 1996 to 1998.

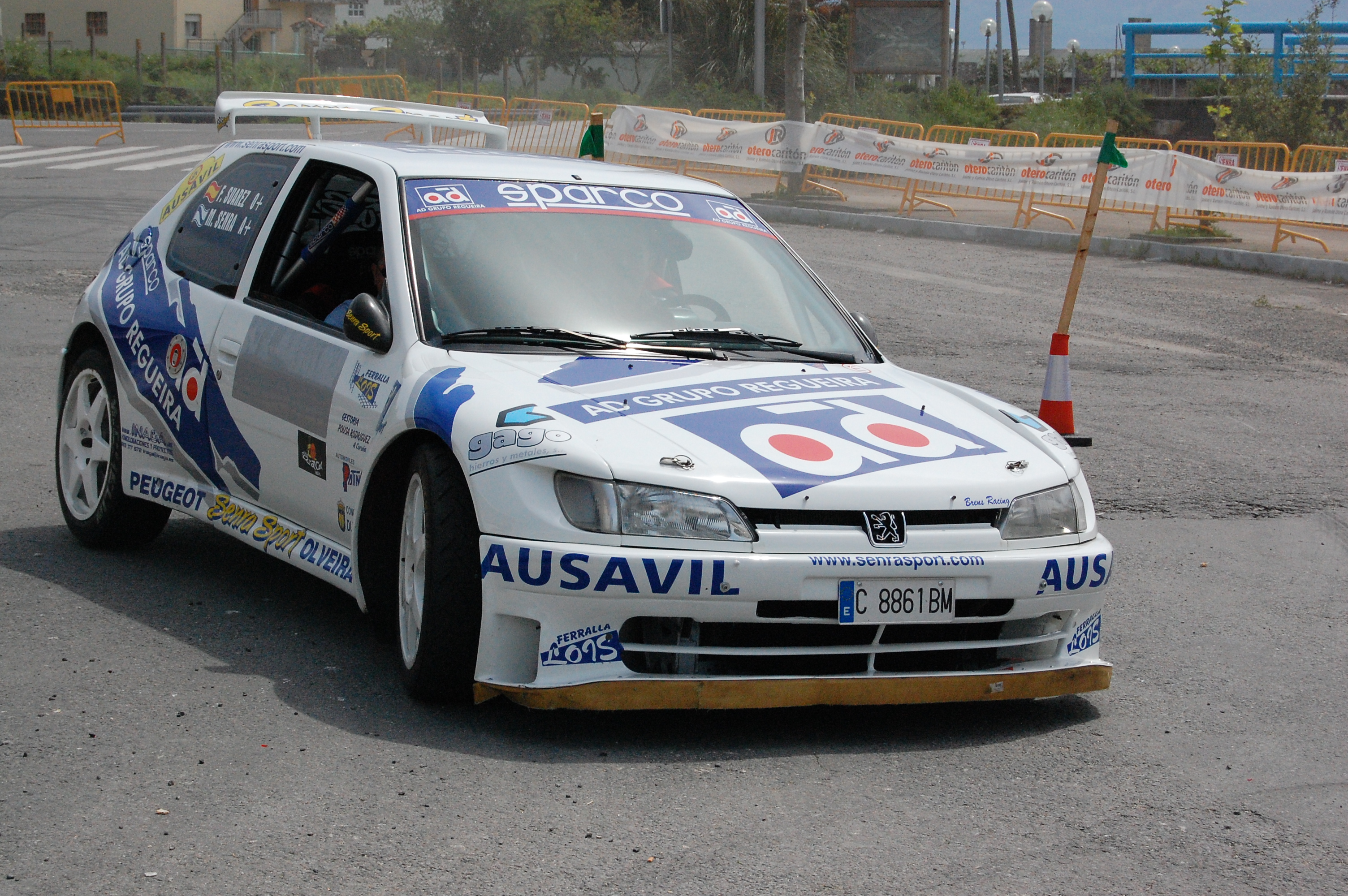
Peugeot 306 Maxi

The series started in 1993, then named the FIA Cup for Manufacturers of Touring Cars (2-Litre) with the series following Group A rules for front wheel drive vehicles, a maximum engine capacity of 2 litres and a single driven axle.

General Motors Europe were the most successful team that year, with Skoda finishing runner-up. The rally victories were spread across several manufacturers; GME took the majority of the victories, with seven, whilst several other manufacturers won a single event; Renault (with a seemingly unsuitable R18 GTX), Skoda and Lada all achieving this.

In January 1995, the rules were changed with the introduction of Kit Cars. These were essentially modified F2 vehicles, permitting more modifications over the standard F2/Group A rules. At the time of their introduction, a heavily modified Kit Car could have a 30 bhp power advantage over a conventional Group A car and could be up to three seconds per mile faster.

Ford debuted their Ford Escort RS2000 Kit Car, which made its WRC debut at that year's Network Q RAC Rally. With the series now renamed the FIA 2-Litre World Cup for Manufacturers, Skoda took the title with their Favorit model, despite it only being a 1300cc class car. The event wins were spread much more evenly than they had been the year before; Skoda, GME and Renault all won two events each, whilst Ford and Nissan won a single event.

1995 saw the series begin to take off with manufacturers building or upgrading their cars to Kit Car spec. Reigning champions Skoda replaced the Favorit with the new Felicia KC, and initially entered it in both 1300 and 1500cc form. Citroën entered a ZX 16v Kit Car, whilst their French rivals Peugeot and Renault entered their 306 Maxi and Clio Maxi cars respectively. SEAT completed the new entries with their Ibiza Kit Car. Peugeot were the victors at the end of the season, as GME were not classified.

In 1996, SEAT won the title by nine points, ahead of Renault in second place, with the latter company debuting their Renault Megane Maxi. Suzuki built a Baleno Kit Car, and entered it in the 1996 Rally Australia, without success, whilst Ford released an updated version of the Escort with the Escort Maxi Kit Car.

In 1997, SEAT won the title by 70 points, ahead of Skoda in second place, with the latter company debuting their Skoda Octavia Kit Car. Also building kit cars for the first time in 1997 were Hyundai, with their Hyundai Coupe Kit Car, whilst Nissan entered a 1300cc Micra Kit Car and a 2000cc Almera GTI Kit Car, with Citroën and Peugeot entering the 1600cc Saxo Kit Car and 106 Maxi respectively. Gilles Panizzi caused a major upset when he finished third outright on the all-tarmac Rallye Catalunya in his Peugeot 306 Maxi, defeating all bar two of the World Championship cars. To prove it was not a fluke Panizzi did the same on the Tour de Corse just weeks later with team mate François Delecour finishing fourth. This emphasised a split in W2L car production with the French manufacturers building tarmac specialised cars that could win outright at the cost of making them uncompetitive on gravel events. With several national championships in western Europe running all-tarmac series it became a viable option.

In 1998, SEAT won the title, making it three back-to-back titles, whilst runners-up Peugeot finished 12 points behind. Vauxhall/Opel debuted their Astra Kit Car at the 1998 Rally of Great Britain, with a second-place finish for Jarmo Kytolehto. The Peugeot 306 Maxi inched closer to an outright WRC victory, running competitive times all through the Monte Carlo Rally, Rallye Catalunya and Rallye Sanremo with Francois Delecour finishing second on the Tour de Corse only beaten by Colin McRae's Subaru.

In 1999, Renault won the title by seven points from Hyundai, but with only three teams left in the category (one of whom, Volkswagen, were not classified as they had not homologated their new Golf GTI Kit Car), it was phased out at the end of the season. The class was eventually replaced by the Super 1600-spec Junior World Rally Championship, and the Super 2000-spec Production World Rally Championship.

The need for replacement regulations was emphasised when Philippe Bugalski took his tarmac optimised Citroën Xsara Kit Car to victory in Rallye Catalunya and three weeks later the Tour de Corse beating all the WRC cars.

== Champions ==
Year	Team	Points
1993	General Motors Europe	74
1994	Škoda	43
1995	Peugeot	257
1996	SEAT	274
1997	SEAT	114
1998	SEAT	87
1999	Renault	102

== See also ==
- Super 2000 World Rally Championship
- Production World Rally Championship
- Junior World Rally Championship
- WRC2
- WRC3
