= Wales Rally GB =

Largest and most high-profile motor rally in the United Kingdom

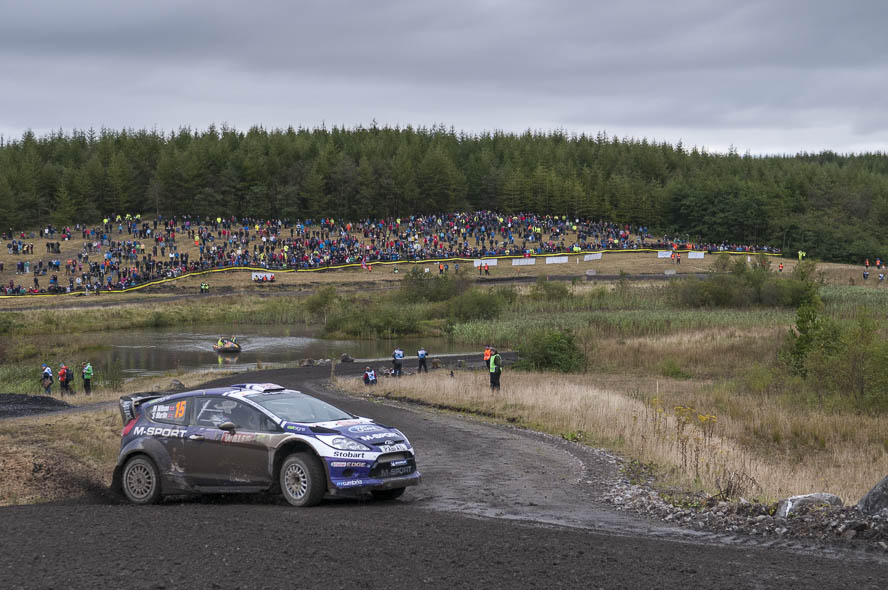
- Status: Defunct
- Genre: Motor sporting event
- Frequency: Annual
- Location: Wales
- Country: United Kingdom
- Inaugurated: 1932
- Most recent: 2019
- Website: https://www.rallyuk.org/

Wales Rally GB was the most recent iteration of the United Kingdom's premier international motor rally, which ran under various names since the first event held in 1932. It was consistently a round of the FIA World Rally Championship (WRC) calendar from the inaugural 1973 season until the rally's final running in 2019, and was also frequently included in the British Rally Championship.

The first rallies in the 1930s were simply known as Royal Automobile Club (RAC) Rallies and did not necessarily require leaving England. In 1951 the club organised the first annual RAC International Rally of Great Britain to tour the island, and until the 53rd event in 1997 this was still commonly known as the RAC Rally. In 1998, amidst a restructuring of the club and its commercial activities, the event lost its RAC identity and became known as the Rally of Great Britain or Rally GB, with title sponsorship from the Government of Wales since 2003.

The last planned Wales Rally GB was cancelled in 2020 due to the COVID-19 pandemic and the Welsh Government withdrew sponsorship support. Attempts were made to replace it with a Rally UK or Rally Northern Ireland, held entirely in Northern Ireland, however no such event has run as of April 2024.

== History ==
=== Royal Automobile Club Rallies ===
==== 1930s ====
The inaugural event was the 1932 Royal Automobile Club Rally, which was the first major rally of the modern era in Great Britain. Of the 367 crews entered, 341 competitors in unmodified cars started from nine different towns and cities (London, Bath, Norwich, Leamington, Buxton, Harrogate, Liverpool, Newcastle upon Tyne and Edinburgh.)

The Official Programme explained:

Different routes are followed from the nine starting points, each approximately 1,000 miles (1,600 km) long, but all finishing at Torquay. On every route there are four controls in addition to the starting and finishing controls, and these are open for periods varying from seven to four hours. Competitors may report at these controls at any time during the hours of opening. ... At the final control they must check in as near their fixed finishing time as possible, and any considerable deviation from this time results in loss of marks.

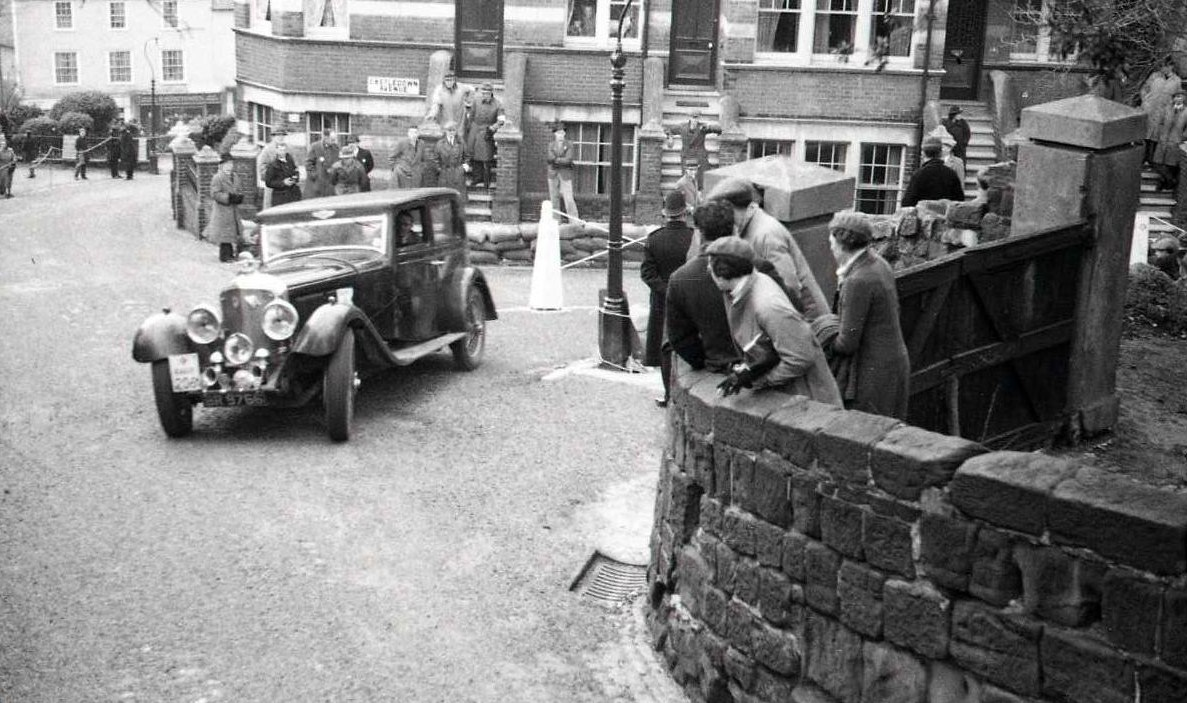
Bentley Speed Six, Hastings, 1937 RAC Rally

Completing the routes held no other competitive element other than following them within the time schedules, which were deliberately made easy by the RAC so that everybody made it to Torquay. However, competitors performed tests at the finish in Torquay, involving slow running, acceleration and braking. There was no official winner declared, although Colonel A. H. Loughborough in a Lanchester 15/18 was recorded as having the fewest penalty points in the decisive tests at the finish. He completed the 100-yard slow driving test at an average speed of 0.66 mph (1.06 km/h), which was found to be less punishing under the scoring system than Donald Healey found by being fastest in the 100-yard (91 m) acceleration test, completing it in 7.6 seconds.

The following year's RAC Rally followed a similar format, but with Hastings as the chosen finish. Over three hundred competitors entered, and this time Miss Kitty Brunell, driving an AC four-seater sports, was the driver with the fewest penalties. Over the next few years the rallies finished at various towns including Brighton and Blackpool. The rally was run annually until 1939, after which the outbreak of the Second World War forced its suspension.

=== RAC International Rallies of Great Britain ===
==== 1950s: Rallies of the Tests ====
The first post-war RAC rally was the RAC International Rally of Great Britain 1951 and included an 1800 mile itinerary with tests of speed, hill-climbing and regularity. Although the rally still started from multiple points, the cars were convened at Silverstone racing circuit for a high speed test, and from there followed a common itinerary around Scotland, Wales and England, finishing in Bournemouth. Cars had to be standard production models and sold in quantities greater than 50. Many motor manufacturers wanted to enter teams and pressed the Society of Motor Manufacturers and Traders to approve the event to remove taboo surrounding the event being only for privateers.

The 1953 event was included as the third round of the inaugural European Touring Championship and included nine tests and part of the route was a secret. The tests included acceleration and braking held at Silverstone, night driving at Castle Combe, a night climb of Prescott Hill, a speed test at Goodwood and a new 'garaging' test at Llandrindod Wells which involved driving into a garage and parking, leaving the garage on foot then proceeding to return and reverse out of the garage, all against the clock. An official winner was declared for the first time, Ian Appleyard, driving a Jaguar XK120.

In 1954 and the years that followed, the rally received criticism for being "no more than a navigational treasure hunt" in comparison to the rallies being held in Europe at the time such as the Alpine or Liege-Rome-Liege. These demanded exceptional driving skill, endurance or had itineraries that required a higher speed over their entire route to avoid harsher penalties. No event was held in 1957 due to the Suez Crisis, but by 1958 no foreigner entered the rally at all. This didn't stop the award for best foreign driver being awarded, to Paddy Hopkirk of Northern Ireland.

For 1959, the rally was moved to November in the hope of making the rally more of a driving test in wintry weather, attempting to address concerns that the touring, regularity, road-rally wasn't necessary or worthy anymore.

==== 1960s: Introduction of special stages ====
In 1960, organising secretary Jack Kemsley negotiated with the Forestry Commission to use a closed two-mile (3 km) gravel road named Monument Hill in Argyll, Scotland as a speed test. Times were still converted to points for the purposes of the rally competition and were based on an average speed of 40 mph. Swede Erik Carlsson won the rally and was the only driver not to accrue any penalty points at all. His co-driver Stuart Turner is quoted on the Monument Hill stage in the 1987 book RAC Rally by Maurice Hamilton, saying: "there is no doubt that was the point at which the RAC Rally shifted from a traditional "Find Your Way" on the public roads rally to the type of event we know today".

In the following year, 1961, rough gravel forestry roads all over the country were opened up to the drivers and the sealed surfaces such as Oulton Park made a tiny fraction of around 200 miles of special stages. With so many, the results of the rally were based more on what happened on these stages. This, with the introduction of special timing clocks and seeding of entries, secured the rally's future and appeal to international competitors, and the beginning of its reputation as one of the most gruelling and unpredictable fixtures on the calendar.

By 1965 there was over 400 miles across 57 special stages held on a mix of War Department roads, racing circuits and other private venues but the majority were in the forests. In 1966, the Forestry Commission increased the compensation requested for the use of its roads and the rally gained a sponsor in The Sun newspaper to help cover the costs, which were already being assisted by Lombank. From 1965, penalties accrued on the public road sections were being applied in units of time instead of points, with the total time measured on the special stages classifying the results of the rally.

The 1967 event was cancelled on the eve of the event due to the outbreak of foot-and-mouth disease, so competitors staged a mock rally at the Bagshot proving ground as consolation for the press and television (ATV had been persuaded to provide major coverage with in-car cameras for the first time).

==== 1970s: Sponsorship and spectator special stages ====
Until 1970 there had been no title sponsorship, but in that year the rally plates on all cars carried advertising of the event's newspaper sponsor after the name (RAC International Rally of Great Britain sponsored by the Daily Mirror). In 1971, the event's full title itself changed to become known as the Daily Mirror RAC International Rally of Great Britain. This deal lasted for two further events before finance company Lombard North Central, then known as Lombank, took over title rights in 1974. The event became known as the Lombard RAC Rally, and Lombard's name became synonymous with the event for almost two decades. In 1972 Unipart were sponsoring all the 72 individual stages.

In 1971, ticketed 'spectator stages' were introduced and by 1975 had become an important part of the event's profile and source of revenue. These stages were usually short stints at stately homes or other public venues, such as Chatsworth House and Sutton Park. They were popular with spectators as they were closer to large population centres than the forests in Wales or Scotland, and organisers saw them help control the growing numbers of spectators crowding the forests.

The first day became devoted to these stages, in 1976 over 350 miles of road sections for just 14 miles of simple stages. They were often referred to as "Mickey Mouse stages" because of the lack of challenge they offered. Competing driver and columnist Chris Lord used the term and said he understood their purpose, but they were putting drivers off entering. Speaking of itineraries, Roger Clark said he'd rather have longer road sections than have "Mickey Mouse" stages to break them up. Nonetheless, they contributed to the results.

The seventies also saw change in the administration of organisation and authority of the sport. In 1975, the RAC's Competitions Committee was replaced by a Motor Sports Council, which was absorbed by the RAC Motor Sports Association in 1979. The legally independent association was created in December 1977 to organise motorsport events, one of which was the RAC Rally.

==== 1980s ====
The 1985 event was the longest RAC Rally to date, with a total length of 3,465 kilometres (2,153 mi), with 79 hours of driving and 33 hours of rest over six days. Following the death of Henri Toivonen in 1986, limits on overall event length and stage length were put in place. Night stages were still permitted, however minimum break times prevented stages taking places through the night.

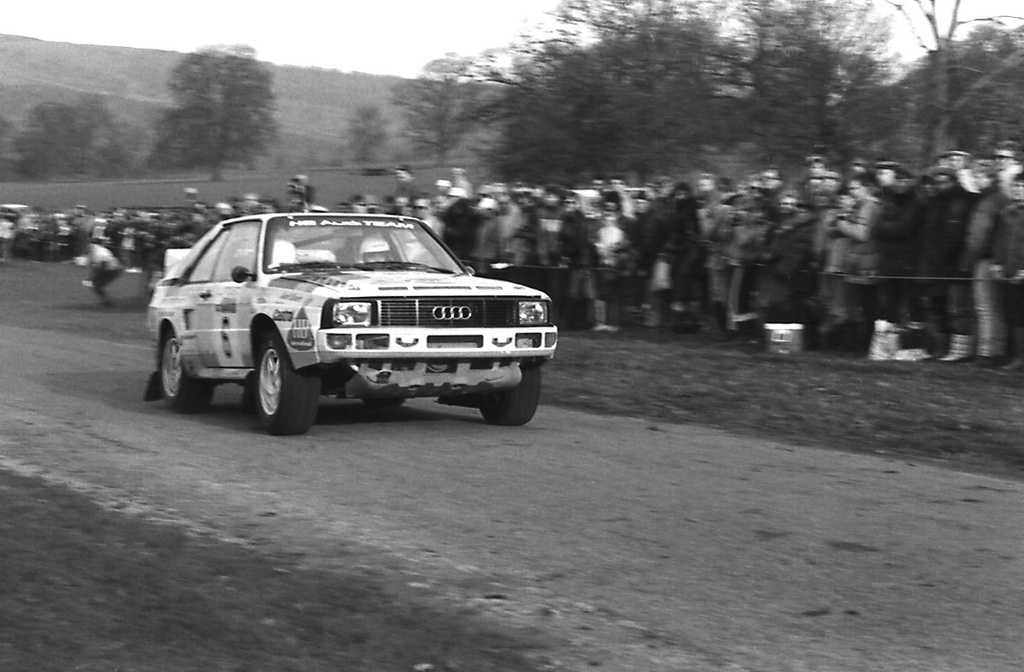
Michèle Mouton at the 1984 rally with an Audi Sport Quattro

The 1986 RAC Rally was the last European event for Group B vehicles. These highly tuned turbocharged cars were to be banned as they were deemed too powerful and dangerous, in light of the various accidents in which they were involved. In the end, the Peugeot 205 T16 Evo. 2s of Timo Salonen, Juha Kankkunen and Mikael Sundström took three of the top four places, with only Markku Alén's second position in the Lancia Delta S4 preventing a monopoly of the podium.

There were 83 finishers out of 150 starters in 1986, compared to year of worst attrition in 1981 when only 54 of the 151 starters reached the end. This was in stark contrast to the early years: in 1938, there were only 6 retirements from 237 starters.

==== 1990s ====
During the 1990s, the length of the rally was gradually reduced, in line with other international rallies. 1989 was the last event to take place over 5 days, with 1995 the last event to take place over 4 days. The 1990 event was the first to allow crews to use pacenotes, as previous editions did not allow crews to perform reconnaissance runs through the route beforehand.

1996 would be the last time to-date that forest stages would be run outside of Wales, with the opening leg taking place in Kielder Forest and the Scottish Borders.

=== Rallies of Great Britain ===
In 1998, 'RAC' disappeared from both the name of the rally and its organising body (RAC MSA). Earlier that year the Club had begun a lengthy process of restructuring and altering its constitution in order to sell its commercial motoring services operation to Cendant. This sale was ultimately blocked by the state on monopoly concerns, but a sale was made early in 1999 to Lex Group.

It's possible that 'RAC' was dropped by request of the existing title sponsor of the rally Network Q, who offered similar commercial services to both Cendant and Lex Group. It's more likely, though not explicitly proven, that use of RAC branding was sold as part of the motoring services deal. (Note: Prior to the sale, the club distinctly arranged its affairs into Royal Automobile Club for clubhouse activities, and RAC for all the motoring services to be sold. The rally organiser RAC Motor Sports Association, a third entity wholly owned by the Club, legally became the Royal Automobile Club Motor Sports Association in October 1998. Its public image was simply as MSA, and it introduced a new logo featuring only the three letters shortly after. After the sale and restructure the club returned to its original position and aim of being a not-for-profit private member's club. Reciprocally, there was, and there remains, no commercial or official use of the full Royal Automobile Club name by the Lex Group or any of RAC's owners since except in explaining its history.)

==== 2000s: New formats ====
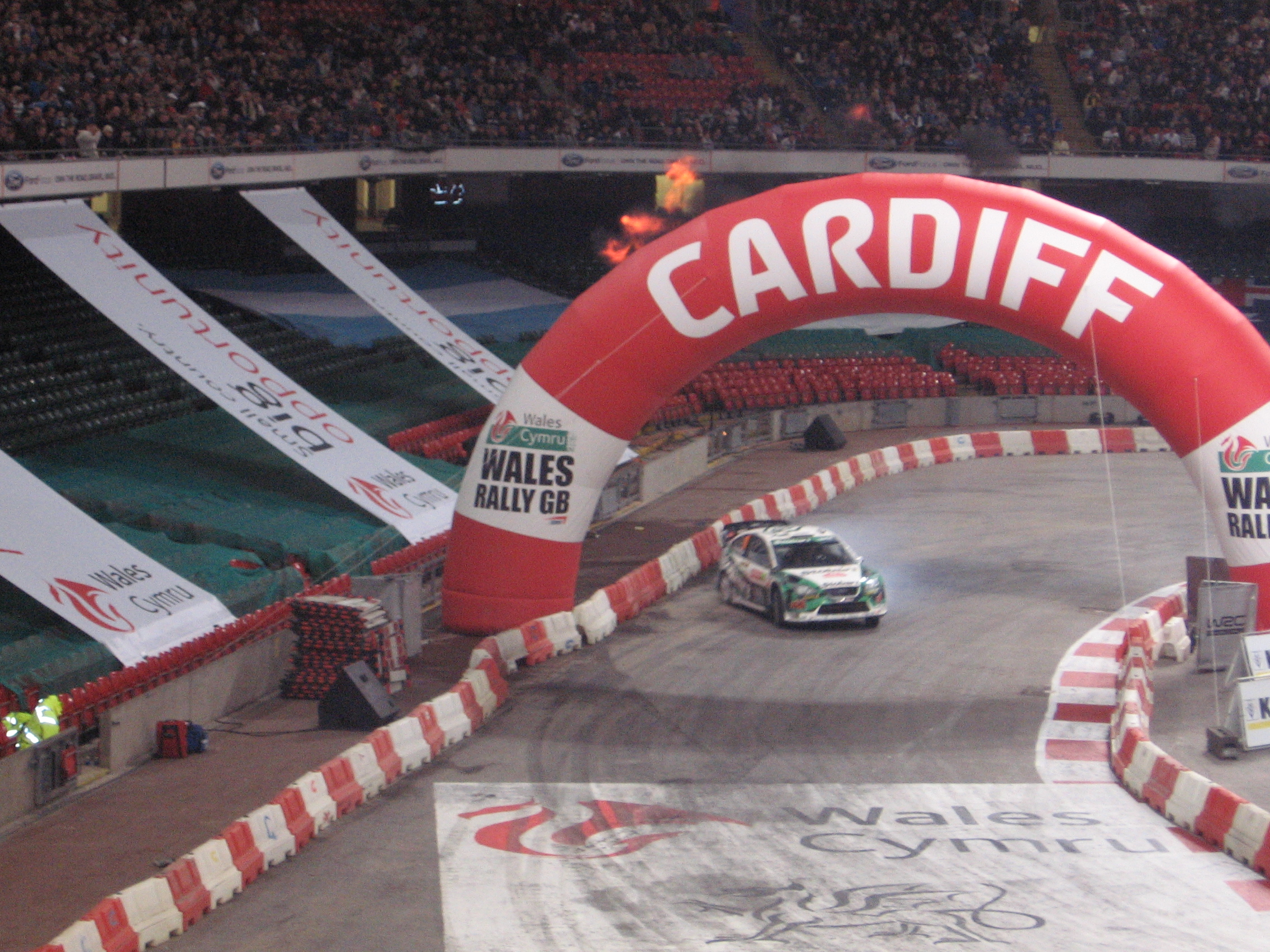
Super special stage at Millennium Stadium, Cardiff

In 2000, the WRC's commercial rights holder International Sportsworld Communicators was sold to a consortium led by David Richards, who revolutionised the series into a TV and spectator friendly series whilst cutting costs. One of the biggest changes implemented was to condense the rallies into a more compact area rather than touring the country, reducing 'dead air' road sections that provided little value to anybody. This was quickly followed by a reduction of services, ultimately to just one central service park; and the double-running of stages in a 'cloverleaf' format was supposed to provide more value for the organisers, competitors, media production and spectators. Additionally, all WRC rallies followed a format of starting on a Thursday evening or Friday morning, to finishing on a Sunday afternoon.

The 2000 Rally GB could no longer start on a Sunday with a day of 'spectator stages' at the traditional stately homes or venues. Instead, tickets were needed for all special stages for the first time, and all stages were run on gravel 'in the forests', with the exception of a short head-to-head super-special held at a purpose-built spectator arena in Cardiff Docks. The rally started and ended in Cardiff and at no point left South or Mid-Wales, the first time in the event's history it had not covered roads in England or Scotland. 2001 saw just one central service area employed at Felindre, near Swansea, then in 2002 every special stage was run more than once.

After 10 years of sponsorship by Network Q, the Welsh Assembly became the title sponsor in 2003, helping to cement the rally's foothold in Wales.

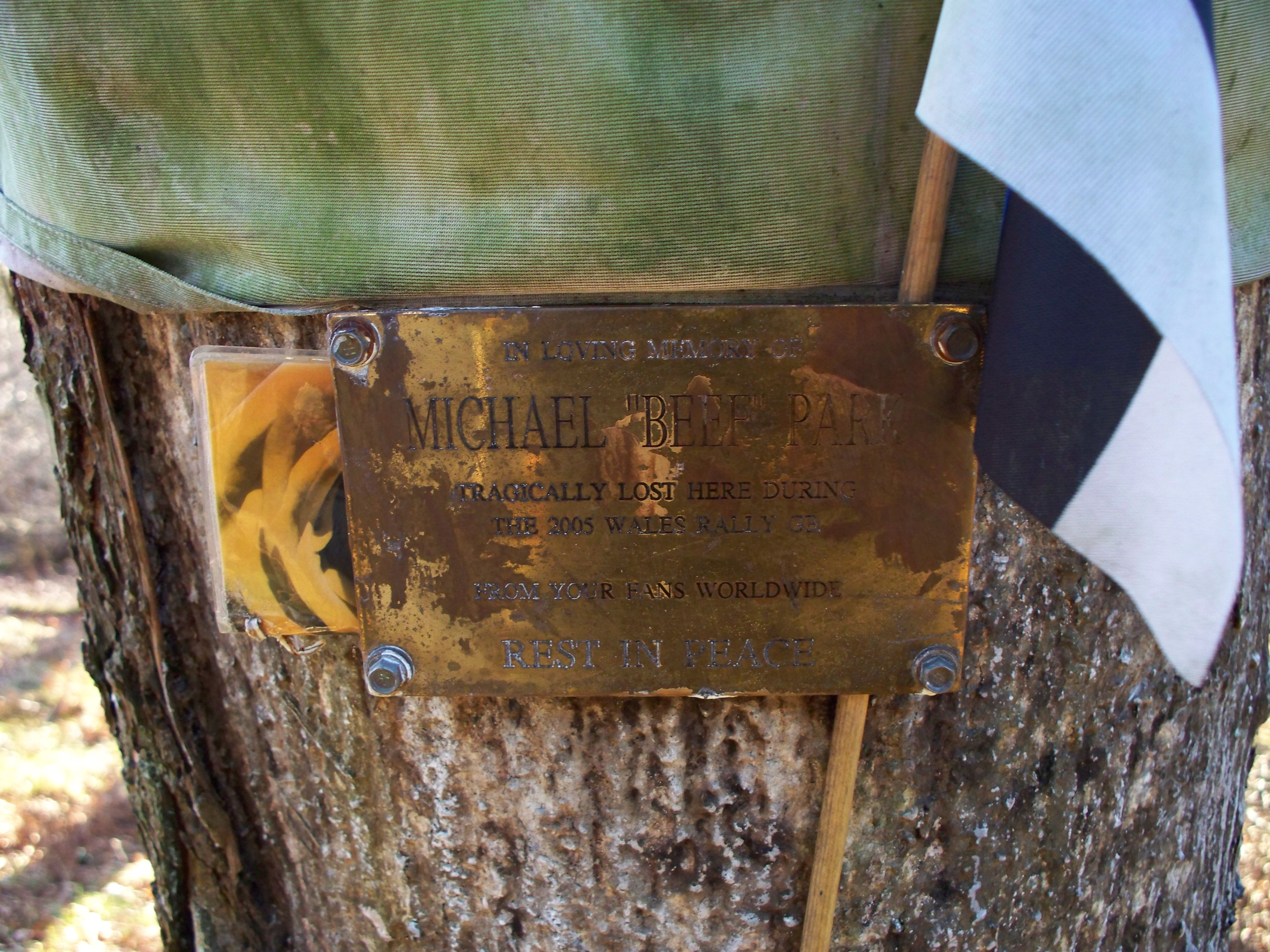
Memorial for Michael Park situated where he lost his life in Margam Park.

The 2005 rally included the first indoor super special stage at the Millennium Stadium in Cardiff. The rally was overshadowed by a death on the final day. On stage fifteen, Peugeot driver Markko Märtin crashed heavily into a tree, and while he was unharmed his co-driver Michael Park sustained fatal injuries. It was the first death in the WRC in over a decade. The final two stages were cancelled and Sébastien Loeb, who would have won the event and the championship, voluntarily incurred a two-minute time penalty in order not to win under such circumstances, leaving Petter Solberg to be declared the victor. A memorial for Park was unveiled in Märtin's homeland of Estonia and the damaged tree on the Margam Park stage of the rally where he died bears a plaque in memorial of him.

==== 2010s ====
After being centred in South Wales since 2000, the 2011 edition of the rally started in Llandudno in North Wales and then heading south towards Cardiff during the rally. From 2013, the rally was centred in North Wales, with a service park located in Deeside, near Chester. In 2016 an agreement was reached between the MSA and Natural Resources Wales to continue to use Welsh forest stages for three years.

==== 2020s ====
Rally GB was one of several World Championship rallies cancelled due to the COVID-19 pandemic in 2020, marking the first time in the history of the series that a round in Britain had not been held. A proposed move to Northern Ireland was scrapped for 2021 after the prospective organisers failed to reach an agreement with local government to host the rally. As a result Rally GB was replaced by the Belgian Ypres Rally on the 2021 calendar. Despite further attempts by Motorsport UK to organise a rally, it did not appear on the 2022, 2023, 2024, 2025 or 2026 calendars.

After a six-year absence from the schedule, Rally GB was resurrected as Rally Scotland for the 2027 season.

== Character ==
=== Road profile ===
British forest stages feature relatively high average speeds, although for the most part not as fast as those of Scandinavia. The crests are also not as sharp and there are little-to-no natural jumps or yumps.

The stages throughout the country alternate between more natural long, sweeping corners and others with man-made long straights and angular corners.

The roads are commonly smooth and all feature a hard base and minimal loose surface material. That being said Kielder stages are rougher and more abrasive, as well as being heavily built-up in the centre and cambered towards the edges.

Road width varies throughout the country. Stages in North Wales and the Lake District are typically narrow, whilst those of South Wales and Kielder are much wider.

=== Weather ===
Typically run in November, rainfall is almost guaranteed and wet and muddy road conditions have become the defining characteristic of the rally throughout its history. Temperatures at this time of year rarely exceed double digits. Therefore the ideal road position is viewed to be one of the earlier cars through the stage, as the road becomes more polished or cut-up by every passing car.

Ice and snow are also not an uncommon occurrence for Britain at this time of year, and varying levels have affected the rally over the years. Editions such as 1971, 1988 and 1993 featured heavy snow conditions, particularly in the Northern-most sections of the route. The most recent edition to be affected by freezing conditions was 2008, when several stages on the opening day had to be either shortened or cancelled due to substantial ice. The issue of freezing is further complicated by the outlaw of studded tyres in British forests by the Forestry Commission, in order to prevent damage to the roads.

The unique weather conditions encountered on the rally have been viewed as a major put-off for several top drivers. Double world champion Walter Röhrl perhaps being the most high profile competitor to state his dislike for the event.

=== Title showdowns ===
For many years the rally has traditionally been the last round of the World Championship, and therefore has staged many famous down-to-the-wire showdowns.

In 1991 the world championship came down-to-the-wire in the British forests, with Lancia driver Juha Kankkunen edging out Toyota's Carlos Sainz after the Spaniard suffered engine issues and went off the road in Kielder Forest and damaged his car.

One year later and Sainz and Kankkunen returned to the RAC along with Frenchman Didier Auriol to fight for the 1992 title. Auriol's challenge would end with engine failure, and Kankkunen's hopes were also dashed when he went off and damaged his steering on the final day of the rally in southern Scotland. Sainz eventually won the rally and with it claimed his second world title.

In 1995, it was estimated that around 2 million fans lined the forests to witness Scotsman Colin McRae win his second consecutive RAC Rally. In the process he beat teammate Carlos Sainz to take his first and only world title in front of thousands of fans at Chester Racecourse.

McRae would have less fortune in future years; despite winning again in 1997, he was pipped to the title by Finn Tommi Mäkinen by just one point. The Scot would come up short again in 2001 when he crashed out of an early lead, gifting the championship to his English rival Richard Burns.

One of the most dramatic showdowns was 1998, when championship leader Tommi Mäkinen crashed out on one of the first day's spectator stages after his Mitsubishi hit a patch of oil, slid and tore a wheel off. This seemingly handed the title to Toyota's Carlos Sainz. However, in a cruel twist of fate Sainz's engine let go just 300 meters from the finish line of the final stage, meaning that Mäkinen claimed the championship title, with Luis Moya famously throwing his helmet through the car's rear window in frustration.

In 2003, a four-way title fight was narrowed down to just two when Burns was forced to withdraw from the event for medical reasons, which would tragically claim his life two years later, and Carlos Sainz crashed out. In the end, Norwegian Petter Solberg would win the rally ahead of Sébastien Loeb, and consequently beat the Frenchman to claim his only world rally title by just one point.

=== Nordic successes ===
Nordic drivers have enjoyed rich pickings in the RAC Rally through the years. Home drivers won the first six runnings of the race from 1953, when an outright winner was first declared. However, in 1960 Erik Carlsson of Sweden drove his Saab 96 to a hat-trick of victories in 1960–1962. Of the nine drivers to have won three or more rallies, five have been Swedes, Finns or Norwegians. The record for most victories is currently five, won by Sébastien Ogier (2013–2016, 2018), who surpassed Finnish Hannu Mikkola (1978–79, 1981–82) and Norwegian Petter Solberg (2002–2005). Though, last time a Nordic driver won Rally GB, was in 2012 (Jari-Matti Latvala).

=== Title sponsors ===
Until 1970 there had been no title sponsorship, but in that year the rally plates on all cars carried advertising of the event's newspaper sponsor after the name (RAC International Rally of Great Britain sponsored by the Daily Mirror). In 1971, the event's full title itself changed to become known as the Daily Mirror RAC International Rally of Great Britain. This deal lasted for two further events before finance company Lombard North Central, then known as Lombank, took over title rights in 1974. The event became known as the Lombard RAC Rally, and Lombard's name became synonymous with the event.

Following Lombard's withdrawal of sponsorship after nineteen years, the rally became known as the Network Q RAC Rally and later, the Network Q Rally of Great Britain. The rally moved its operational base to Cardiff in 2000 and competitive stage mileage was concentrated in Wales. With sponsorship from the Welsh Government, the event was known as the Wales Rally GB.

However, with such an extensive history covering the whole country, there were demands for the "glory days" of the old RAC Rally. In this spirit, two events have recently been established, and cover the same classic stages which are no longer part of the WRC itinerary. The RAC Revival Rally uses modern, but less powerful cars, while the Roger Albert Clark Rally is a historic event using only pre-1972 machinery, and named after the first home winner of the race as a World Championship event.

== Past winners ==
Year	Event	Finish	Winner(s) (Note: Prior to 1953, only class winners were officially recognised, and the overall winners shown are the entrant who received the most points (or fewest penalties) in the event. No winners of any kind were recognised in 1935.)	Vehicle
1932	Torquay Rally	Torquay	(United Kingdom) Col. Loughborough	Lanchester
1933	RAC Rally	Hastings	(United Kingdom) Miss Kitty Brunell	AC four-seater sports
1934	RAC Rally	Bournemouth	(United Kingdom) F R G Spikins	Singer Le Mans
1935	RAC Rally	Eastbourne	No winners announced	
1936	RAC Rally	Torquay	(United Kingdom) C E A Westcott	Austin 7
1937	RAC Rally	Hastings	(United Kingdom) Jack Harrop	SS Jaguar 100
1938	RAC Rally	Blackpool	(United Kingdom) Jack Harrop	SS Jaguar 100
1939	RAC Rally	Brighton	(United Kingdom) Abiegeg Fane	BMW 328
1940–50		Not held		
1951	1st RAC Rally	Bournemouth	(United Kingdom) Ian Appleyard (United Kingdom) Mrs. Pat Appleyard	Jaguar XK120
1952	2nd RAC Rally	Scarborough	(United Kingdom) Godfrey Imhof (United Kingdom) Mrs. Barbara Frayling	Allard-Cadillac J2
1953	3rd RAC Rally	Hastings	(United Kingdom) Ian Appleyard (United Kingdom) Mrs. Pat Appleyard	Jaguar XK120
1954	4th RAC Rally	Blackpool	(United Kingdom) John Wallwork (United Kingdom) Harold Brooks	Triumph TR2
1955	5th RAC Rally	Hastings	(United Kingdom) Jimmy Ray (United Kingdom) Brian Horrocks	Standard Ten
1956	6th RAC Rally	Blackpool	(United Kingdom) Lyndon Sims (United Kingdom) Rupert Jones (United Kingdom) Tony Ambrose	Aston Martin DB2
1957		Not held		
1958	7th RAC Rally	Hastings	(United Kingdom) Peter Harper (United Kingdom) Dr Bill Deane	Sunbeam Rapier
1959	8th RAC Rally	London	(United Kingdom) Gerald Burgess (United Kingdom) Sam Croft-Pearson	Ford Zephyr Six
1960	9th RAC Rally	Brands Hatch	(Sweden) Erik Carlsson (United Kingdom) Stuart Turner	Saab 96
1961	10th RAC Rally	Brighton	(Sweden) Erik Carlsson (United Kingdom) John Brown	Saab 96
1962	11th RAC Rally	Bournemouth	(Sweden) Erik Carlsson (United Kingdom) David Stone	Saab 96
1963	12th RAC Rally	Bournemouth	(Sweden) Tom Trana (Sweden) Sune Lundström	Volvo PV544
1964	13th RAC Rally	London	(Sweden) Tom Trana (Sweden) Gunnar Thermanius	Volvo PV544
1965	14th RAC Rally	London	(Finland) Rauno Aaltonen (United Kingdom) Tony Ambrose	BMC Mini Cooper S 1275
1966	15th RAC Rally	London	(Sweden) Bengt Söderström (Sweden) Gunnar Palm	Lotus Cortina
1967		Cancelled due to outbreak of foot-and-mouth disease		
1968	16th RAC Rally	London	(Finland) Simo Lampinen (United Kingdom) John Davenport	Saab 96 V4
1969	17th RAC Rally	London	(Sweden) Harry Källström (Sweden) Gunnar Häggbom	Lancia Fulvia 1.6 Coupé HF
1970	18th RAC Rally	London	(Sweden) Harry Källström (Sweden) Gunnar Häggbom	Lancia Fulvia 1.6 Coupé HF
1971	19th Daily Mirror RAC Rally	Harrogate	(Sweden) Stig Blomqvist (Sweden) Arne Hertz	Saab 96 V4
1972	20th Daily Mirror RAC Rally	York	(United Kingdom) Roger Clark (United Kingdom) Tony Mason	Ford Escort RS1600
1973	21st Daily Mirror RAC Rally	York	(Finland) Timo Mäkinen (United Kingdom) Henry Liddon	Ford Escort RS1600
1974	22nd Lombard RAC Rally	York	(Finland) Timo Mäkinen (United Kingdom) Henry Liddon	Ford Escort RS1600
1975	23rd Lombard RAC Rally	York	(Finland) Timo Mäkinen (United Kingdom) Henry Liddon	Ford Escort RS1800
1976	24th Lombard RAC Rally	Bath	(United Kingdom) Roger Clark (Zaire) Stuart Pegg	Ford Escort RS1800
1977	25th Lombard RAC Rally	York	(Sweden) Björn Waldegård (Sweden) Hans Thorszelius	Ford Escort RS1800
1978	26th Lombard RAC Rally	Birmingham	(Finland) Hannu Mikkola (Sweden) Arne Hertz	Ford Escort RS1800
1979	27th Lombard RAC Rally	Chester	(Finland) Hannu Mikkola (Sweden) Arne Hertz	Ford Escort RS1800
1980	28th Lombard RAC Rally	Bath	(Finland) Henri Toivonen (United Kingdom) Paul White	Talbot Sunbeam Lotus
1981	29th Lombard RAC Rally	Chester	(Finland) Hannu Mikkola (Sweden) Arne Hertz	Audi Quattro
1982	30th Lombard RAC Rally	York	(Finland) Hannu Mikkola (Sweden) Arne Hertz	Audi Quattro
1983	31st Lombard RAC Rally	Bath	(Sweden) Stig Blomqvist (Sweden) Björn Cederberg	Audi Quattro A2
1984	32nd Lombard RAC Rally	Chester	(Finland) Ari Vatanen (United Kingdom) Terry Harryman	Peugeot 205 Turbo 16
1985	33rd Lombard RAC Rally	Nottingham	(Finland) Henri Toivonen (United Kingdom) Neil Wilson	Lancia Delta S4
1986	34th Lombard RAC Rally	Bath	(Finland) Timo Salonen (Finland) Seppo Harjanne	Peugeot 205 Turbo 16 E2
1987	35th Lombard RAC Rally	Chester	(Finland) Juha Kankkunen (Finland) Juha Piironen	Lancia Delta HF 4WD
1988	36th Lombard RAC Rally	Harrogate	(Finland) Markku Alen (Finland) Ilkka Kivimäki	Lancia Delta Integrale
1989	37th Lombard RAC Rally	Nottingham	(Finland) Pentti Airikkala (Republic of Ireland) Ronan McNamee	Mitsubishi Galant VR-4
1990	38th Lombard RAC Rally	Harrogate	(Spain) Carlos Sainz (Spain) Luis Moya	Toyota Celica GT-Four ST165
1991	39th Lombard RAC Rally	Harrogate	(Finland) Juha Kankkunen (Finland) Juha Piironen	Lancia Delta Integrale 16V
1992	40th Lombard RAC Rally	Chester	(Spain) Carlos Sainz (Spain) Luis Moya	Toyota Celica Turbo 4WD
1993	49th Network Q RAC Rally	Birmingham	(Finland) Juha Kankkunen (United Kingdom) Nicky Grist	Toyota Celica Turbo 4WD
1994	50th Network Q RAC Rally	Chester	(United Kingdom) Colin McRae (United Kingdom) Derek Ringer	Subaru Impreza 555
1995	51st Network Q RAC Rally	Chester	(United Kingdom) Colin McRae (United Kingdom) Derek Ringer	Subaru Impreza 555
1996 (Note: In 1996, due to the World Rally Championship's event rotation system used from 1994 to 1996, the rally counted only for the FIA 2-Litre World Championship for Manufacturers.)	52nd Network Q RAC Rally	Chester	(Germany) Armin Schwarz (France) Denis Giraudet	Toyota Celica GT-Four ST205
1997	53rd Network Q RAC Rally	Cheltenham	(United Kingdom) Colin McRae (United Kingdom) Nicky Grist	Subaru Impreza WRC 97
1998	54th Network Q Rally of Great Britain	Cheltenham	(United Kingdom) Richard Burns (United Kingdom) Robert Reid	Mitsubishi Carisma GT Evolution V
1999	55th Network Q Rally of Great Britain	Cheltenham	(United Kingdom) Richard Burns (United Kingdom) Robert Reid	Subaru Impreza WRC 99
2000	56th Network Q Rally of Great Britain	Cardiff	(United Kingdom) Richard Burns (United Kingdom) Robert Reid	Subaru Impreza WRC 2000
2001	57th Network Q Rally of Great Britain	Cardiff	(Finland) Marcus Grönholm (Finland) Timo Rautiainen	Peugeot 206 WRC
2002	58th Network Q Rally of Great Britain	Cardiff	(Norway) Petter Solberg (United Kingdom) Phil Mills	Subaru Impreza WRC 2002
2003	59th Wales Rally of Great Britain	Cardiff	(Norway) Petter Solberg (United Kingdom) Phil Mills	Subaru Impreza WRC 2003
2004	60th Wales Rally of Great Britain	Cardiff	(Norway) Petter Solberg (United Kingdom) Phil Mills	Subaru Impreza WRC 2004
2005	61st Wales Rally of Great Britain	Cardiff	(Norway) Petter Solberg (United Kingdom) Phil Mills	Subaru Impreza WRC 2005
2006	62nd Wales Rally of Great Britain	Cardiff	(Finland) Marcus Grönholm (Finland) Timo Rautiainen	Ford Focus RS WRC 06
2007	63rd Wales Rally of Great Britain	Cardiff	(Finland) Mikko Hirvonen (Finland) Jarmo Lehtinen	Ford Focus RS WRC 07
2008	64th Wales Rally of Great Britain	Cardiff	(France) Sébastien Loeb (Monaco) Daniel Elena	Citroën C4 WRC
2009	65th Rally of Great Britain	Cardiff	(France) Sébastien Loeb (Monaco) Daniel Elena	Citroën C4 WRC
2010	66th Wales Rally of Great Britain	Cardiff	(France) Sébastien Loeb (Monaco) Daniel Elena	Citroën C4 WRC
2011	67th Wales Rally of Great Britain	Cardiff	(Finland) Jari-Matti Latvala (Finland) Miikka Anttila	Ford Fiesta RS WRC
2012	68th Wales Rally of Great Britain	Cardiff	(Finland) Jari-Matti Latvala (Finland) Miikka Anttila	Ford Fiesta RS WRC
2013	69th Wales Rally of Great Britain	Deeside	(France) Sébastien Ogier (France) Julien Ingrassia	Volkswagen Polo R WRC
2014	70th Wales Rally of Great Britain	Deeside	(France) Sébastien Ogier (France) Julien Ingrassia	Volkswagen Polo R WRC
2015	71st Wales Rally of Great Britain	Deeside	(France) Sébastien Ogier (France) Julien Ingrassia	Volkswagen Polo R WRC
2016	72nd Wales Rally of Great Britain	Deeside	(France) Sébastien Ogier (France) Julien Ingrassia	Volkswagen Polo R WRC
2017	73rd Wales Rally of Great Britain	Deeside	(United Kingdom) Elfyn Evans (United Kingdom) Daniel Barritt	Ford Fiesta WRC
2018	74th Wales Rally of Great Britain	Deeside	(France) Sébastien Ogier (France) Julien Ingrassia	Ford Fiesta WRC
2019	75th Wales Rally of Great Britain	Llandudno	(Estonia) Ott Tänak (Estonia) Martin Järveoja	Toyota Yaris WRC
2020	76th Wales Rally of Great Britain	Deeside	Cancelled due to COVID-19 concerns	

=== Multiple winners ===
Wins	Driver
5	(France) Sébastien Ogier
4	(Norway) Petter Solberg; (Finland) Hannu Mikkola
3
3	(Finland) Juha Kankkunen; (Finland) Timo Mäkinen
3	(France) Sébastien Loeb
3	(Sweden) Erik Carlsson
3	(United Kingdom) Richard Burns; (United Kingdom) Colin McRae
2
2	(United Kingdom) Roger Clark; (United Kingdom) Ian Appleyard; (United Kingdom) Jack Harrop
2	(Finland) Jari-Matti Latvala; (Finland) Henri Toivonen; (Finland) Marcus Grönholm
2	(Sweden) Harry Källström; (Sweden) Tom Trana; (Sweden) Stig Blomqvist
2	(Spain) Carlos Sainz

Wins	Manufacturers
15	(United Kingdom) Ford
9	(Japan) Subaru
6	(Italy) Lancia
5	(Sweden) Saab
5	(Japan) Toyota
4	(Germany) Volkswagen
4	(United Kingdom) Jaguar
3	(France) Citroën; (France) Peugeot
3	(Germany) Audi
2	(United Kingdom) Lotus
2	(Japan) Mitsubishi
