= Y Gwyliedydd =

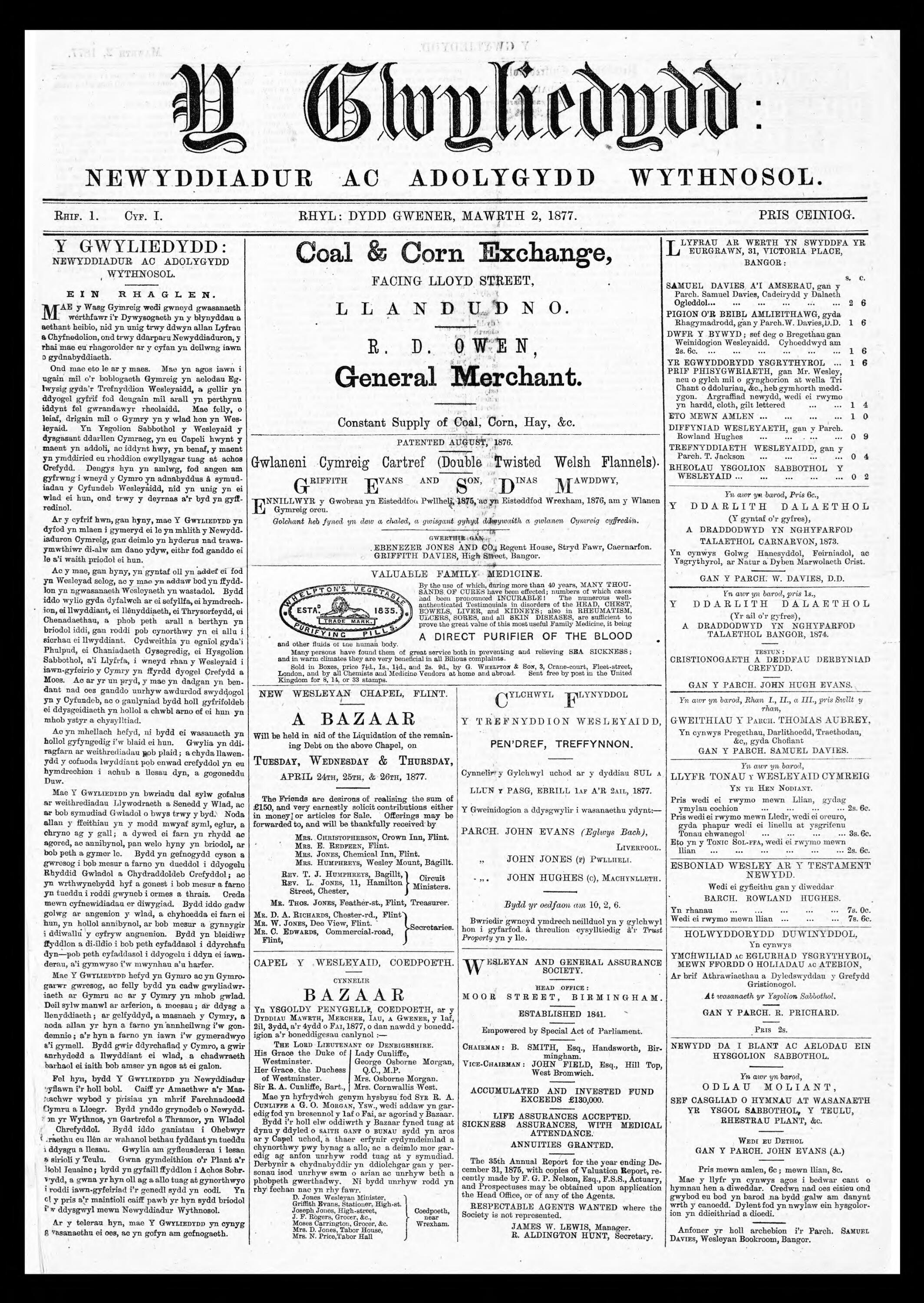
- Type: weekly newspaper
- City: Rhyl

Y Gwyliedydd (established by the Wesleyan Church in 1877) was a weekly Welsh language newspaper, distributed in districts of North and South Wales, and the main cities of England. It contained local and general news.

Associated titles: Gwyliedydd Newydd (1910–1977).
