= Elizabeth Phillips Hughes =

Welsh scholar (1851–1925)

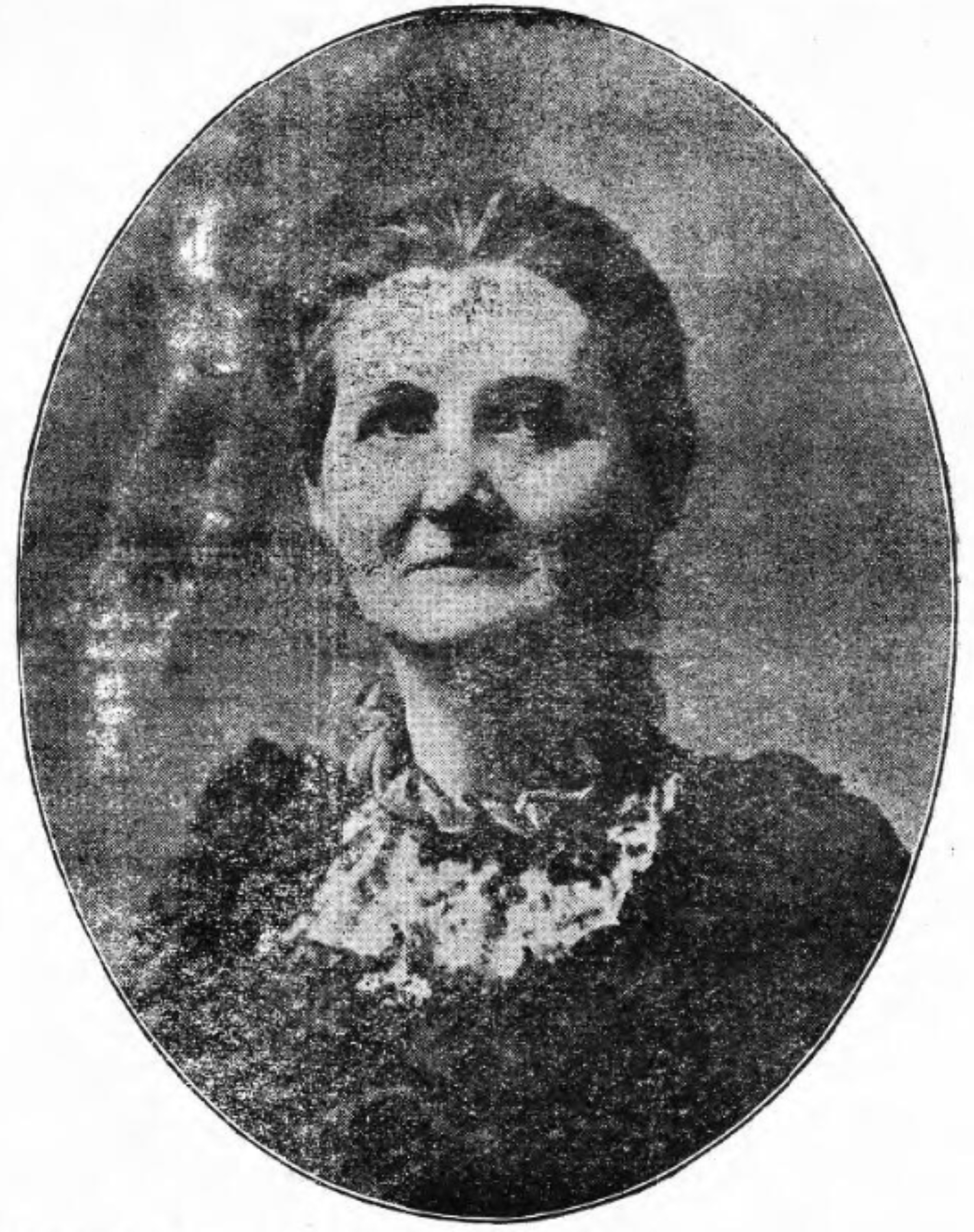
- Elizabeth Phillips Hughes, from a 1905 Welsh newspaper.
- Born: 22 June 1851; Carmarthen
- Died: 19 December 1925; Barry
- Other names: Merch Myrddin (bardic name)
- Occupations: Educator, college administrator, lecturer
- Relatives: Hugh Price Hughes (brother)

Elizabeth Phillips Hughes MBE (22 June 1851 – 19 December 1925) was a Welsh scholar, teacher, and promoter of women's education, first principal of the Cambridge Training College for Women.

== Early life and education ==
Hughes was born in Carmarthen, Carmarthenshire, the daughter of John Hughes and Anne Phillips Hughes. Her father was the first medical officer in Carmarthen. She was the sister of Methodist reformer Hugh Price Hughes and of Frances Hughes. Her maternal great-grandfather was Samuel Levi Phillips, founder of the Haverfordwest Bank, who had converted from Judaism to Christianity, adopting the surname from Levi to Phillips.

She had little education as a child, but later attended a private school in Cheltenham, eventually becoming a teacher at Cheltenham Ladies' College, under the mentorship of Dorothea Beale. She also attended Newnham College, Cambridge, beginning at age 30, and becoming the first woman in the university to take first-class honours in Moral Sciences.

== Career ==
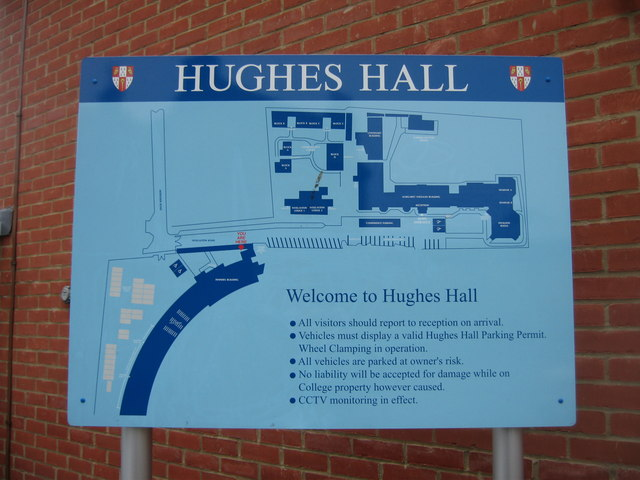
Hughes Hall - geograph.org.uk - 1162705

=== At Cambridge ===
In 1884, Hughes was appointed first principal of the Cambridge Training College for Women, later Hughes Hall, which was renamed in her honour. Under her leadership, the college expanded, became incorporated, and added faculty and facilities, including a library, a museum, and a gymnasium.

In 1887 she was asked to join an Education Department committee looking at the "Pupil-teacher" system chaired by the chief inspector of schools, Thomas Wetherherd Sharpe. Only three women were asked: Hughes, Lydia Manley of Stockwell training college and school inspector Sarah Bannister. The committee's report resulted in a policy that caused the closure of the Pupil-teacher centres that had been established by the end of the century.

She retired from the college in 1899.

=== International and wartime activities ===
After leaving Cambridge, Hughes lived with her younger brother John Arthur Hughes in Barry, in South East Wales but was hardly retired from her educational and reform interests. "I feel keenly that the world wants altering a good deal," she explained of her work.

During a 1901 lecture and study tour of the United States, she met Julia Ward Howe and Mary Tenney Castle, and took an interest in prison reform; she was impressed by American provisions for juvenile detention and female probation officers.

She stayed with Tetsu Yasui and Hannah Riddell, and met Umeko Tsuda, while she served as visiting professor of English at the University of Tokyo (1901–1902), and advocated for physical education for women.

She toured China, Malaysia and Indonesia, attended the Women's International Congress, and spoke at the 1903 meeting of the National Union of Women Workers. During World War I, she was in charge of a Red Cross hospital in Glamorgan, and in 1917 was awarded an MBE for her wartime service.

=== Education in Wales ===
Hughes had a lifelong interest in education in Wales, especially for girls. In 1884, she took a prize at the Liverpool National Eisteddfod for her essay, "The Higher Education of Girls in Wales". She published a pamphlet titled The Educational Future of Wales in 1894. In 1898 she became secretary of the Association for Promoting the Education of Girls in Wales. She helped to found a teachers' college in Barry in 1914. She was the only woman on the committee which drafted the charter of the University of Wales, and in 1920, she received an honorary degree from that university.

== Personal life ==
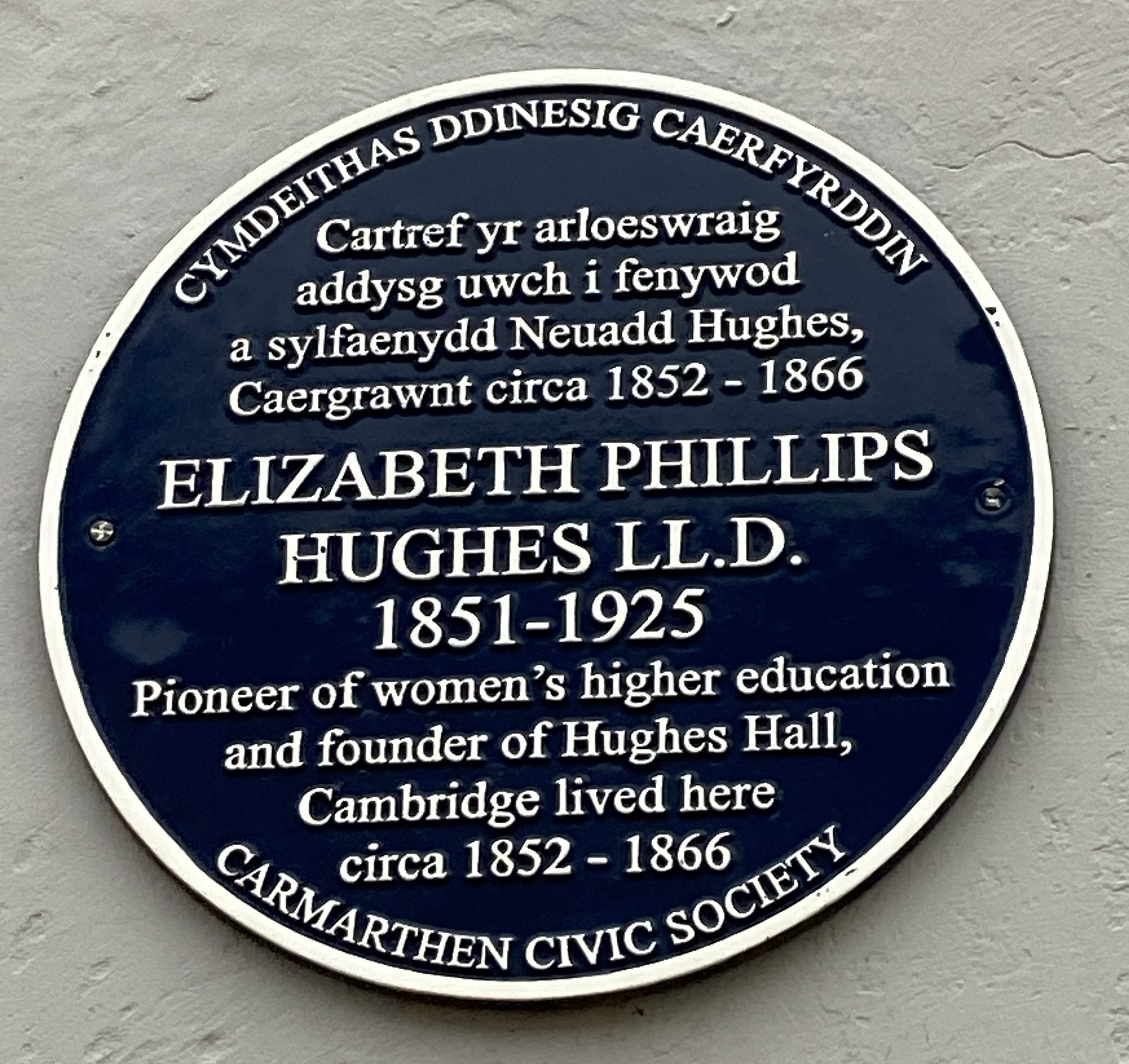
Elizabeth Phillips Hughes blue plaque

Hughes was an avid mountain climber; she climbed the Matterhorn at age 48. She died in 1925, aged 74 years, in Barry.

In 2018, her birthplace in Carmarthen was marked with a blue plaque. In 2021, she was featured in advertisements for a Cambridge fundraising campaign. Hughes is one of the women celebrated by the Barry Women's Trail.
