= Frances Hughes =

British head of a Women's Hall of Residence (1855–1927)

- Born: 14 April 1855; Carmarthen
- Died: 12 February 1927; Cheltenham
- Education: North London Collegiate School
- Occupation: Principal
- Relatives: Hugh Price Hughes, Elizabeth Phillips Hughes

Frances Emily Hughes became Frances Emily Webb-Peploe (14 April 1855 – 12 February 1927) was the head of the women's hall of residence for the University College of North Wales in Bangor. She resigned following a dispute that caused a national debate.

== Life ==
Hughes was born in 1855. Her parents were Anne Phillips and John Hughes. Her father was a surgeon based in Carmarthen and the family already included her brother Hugh Price Hughes and her sister Elizabeth Phillips Hughes. She completed her education at the North London Collegiate School. Her brother became a Wesleyan minister whereas she and her sister became Anglicans.

Hughes was employed as the head of the women's hall of residence for the University College of North Wales (now Bangor University).

== The "Bangor dispute" ==
Myvanwy Rhys, daughter of Elspeth and John Rhŷs, attended the college in Bangor where she lived at the women's hall. Hughes was concerned that Rhys was leaving the hall to visit Violet Osborn. Osborn had arrived at the hall in 1891 when she was 25. She had lived at the hall for a year but then decided to move to Sackville Terrace. Hughes spoke, in confidence, to Myfanwy's mother Elspeth Rhŷs who was a teacher and a prominent campaigner for the education of women. Elspeth said that she was told that the elder Osborn was not good company for Myfanwy. She was "unfavourably brought-up", untruthful and not "pure-minded". It was against the rules for students staying at the halls to visit students who lived elsewhere and Osborn's character was questioned. News of this conversation spread and Osborn and her supporters were concerned at the implication on her reputation. Hughes had expressed doubts about Osborn's intentions and her integrity. The hall's governors asked Hughes to explain herself but she refused to reveal her sources. The university senate deemed that Osborn's conduct had been "refined and honourable" and, as a consequence, Hughes was asked either to resign or face dismissal from the committee managing the halls. The committee's refusal to do so led to the withdrawal of recognition from the women's hall. In 1891 the college decided that any student under the age of 21 should be obliged to live in hall.

Her brother Hugh Price Hughes wrote to The Times in 1893 pointing out that Frances had been mistreated. He supported her view that students who decided to opt-in to staying at hall should not mix with those who opted-out. He added to the fuss by using the phrase "unattached" to refer to women students who were not in hall. The implications of the term implied a lack of supervision and the college objected. Henry Reichel wrote to The Times to complain, but the term "unattached" was re-used by the media as they continued to report the matter. Frances also wrote to The Times and she won a libel case against the Weekly Dispatch.

Two of Bangor's professors were involved in the case. Edward Vernon Arnold married Violet Osborn in 1894. The other, Evan Keri Evans, eventually had to resign his position.

== Later life ==
She married Revd Francis Hanmer Webb-Peploe in 1895 and became known as a minister's wife. She died in the vicarage of Christ Church, Cheltenham on 12 February 1927.
