= Milford and Pembrokeshire Bank =

This Bank was probably founded in 1802. It was established in Pembrokeshire, with a branch at Milford (Milford Haven) and was one of the banks founded as a result of the Bank of England stopping cash payments in 1797.

== History ==
The Bank was operated by the partnership of Charles Philipps, Thomas Philipps & Co. They were members of the Philipps family of St Brides, Pembrokeshire as indicated by the spelling of their surname, and also the heraldic emblem and motto on the bank notes.

Samuel Levi Philips, the founder of the Haverfordwest Bank, was one of the promoters of the Milford and Pembrokeshire Bank and in his will he bequeathed the sum of £1000 to his first son, Philip Philips, ‘advanced as my part of the capital joint stock in the new Milford Bank, as one of the co-partners therein.’ This bank was probably the Milford and Pembrokeshire Bank. However, it was his second son, Nathaniel Philips of Slebech, who became the ‘mainstay’ of the Bank. He was Thomas Philipps brother in law.

The Bank ran into trouble due to the apparent incompetence of Thomas Philipps. He became involved in unsuccessful banking and trading ventures, and the bank also got entangled in Pembrokeshire politics As a result, the Bank collapsed in July 1810, fifteen years before the Panic of 1825, with outstanding bank notes in the sum of £22,289.

== Emigration ==
After the Bank’s collapse, Thomas Philipps, then aged 44, together with his wife and seven children, emigrated to South Africa at the head of a group of Pembrokeshire families, comprising 47 persons in all. They sailed in the ‘Kennersley Castle’ from Bristol, in 1819, and reached Table Bay in March 1820, settling on an arm of the Bush River, at a place which Philipps called Lampeter, and which was later erroneously called New Bristol.

== Bank notes ==
The bank notes state that they were issued for value received at Milford (Milford Haven), thus indicating that the Bank premises were in that town.

== Other Pembrokeshire banks ==
Other Pembrokeshire banks include: Haverfordwest Bank, J. Dunn & Co., Tenby, Union Bank (Pembrokeshire), Milford Bank, Pembrokeshire Bank, and Lock, Hulme & Co.
