= Lock, Hulme & Co. =

Lock, Hulme & Co. was a bank in Pembrokeshire, Wales.

The bank was established by a Mr Hulme, who was a bank clerk. He worked for the Carmarthen Bank before its failure in 1832, and went into partnership with a Mr Robert Lock. They traded under the name Lock, Hulme & Co.

The bank opened a branch in Pembroke and was subsequently purchased by the London and Provincial Bank in 1868. This bank was itself absorbed by the London Provincial and South Western Bank in 1917, which became a constituent bank of Barclays Bank in 1918.

The bank did not issue bank notes as this had been prohibited by the Bank Charter Act 1844 (7 & 8 Vict. c. 32) prior to the bank's foundation.

== Other Pembrokeshire banks ==
Other Pembrokeshire banks include: Haverfordwest Bank, J. Dunn & Co., Tenby, Union Bank (Pembrokeshire), Milford Bank, Milford and Pembrokeshire Bank, and Pembrokeshire Bank
