= Darlunydd =

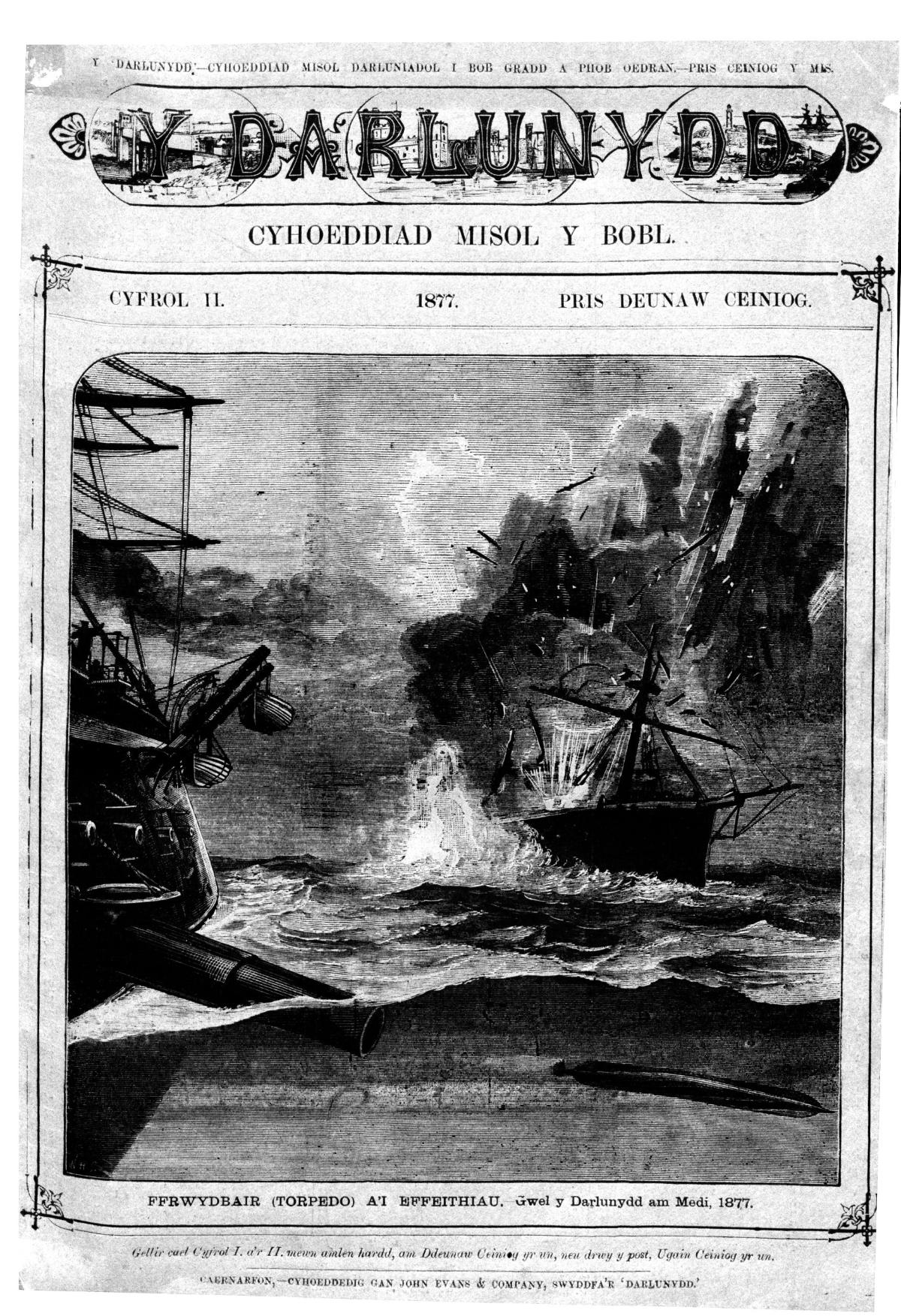
Darlunydd (Welsh Journal)

The Darlunydd was a 19th-century Welsh language periodical, first published in Caernarfon by J. Evans & Company in 1876.

Its editor, John Evans Jones (Y Cwilsyn Gwyn, 1839–1893), was editor of The Caernarvon and Denbigh Herald, and the magazine, which he produced form the same office

The Darlunydd contained articles on current affairs, literature, local personalities; and poetry.
