= Charles Albert Berry =

- Born: 14 December 1852; Bradshawgate, Leigh, Lancashire, England
- Died: 31 January 1899 (aged 46); Bilston, Staffordshire, England
- Occupation: Nonconformist divine

Charles Albert Berry (14 December 1852 – 31 January 1899) was an English nonconformist divine.

== Life ==
He was born at Bradshawgate, Leigh, Lancashire, the son of Peter Berry (died 11 December 1873) of 18 Chapel Street, North Meols, Stockport, joiner and cabinet maker, by Sarah (died 13 June 1892). Berry's father was a confirmed member of the Church of England, but became a Congregationalist by conviction. The family moved to North Meols when Berry was five years old and received his education there.

In 1867 he came under the influence of Dr. J. M. Macaulay, for many years a minister of the Dutch Reformed Church, New York, who resided in England from 1867 to 1871. He received Berry into the church, and prepared him for college. At the age of seventeen he entered Airedale College, Bradford, to train for the Congregational ministry, and in 1875 became pastor of St George's Road Congregational church, Bolton. He became widely known as a man of administrative ability, a vigorous platform speaker and an eloquent preacher.

In July 1883 he undertook the pastorate of the church at Queen Street, Wolverhampton, with the supervision of nine dependent churches in the neighbourhood. Here again he exercised a wide influence, due in part to his evangelical conviction, eloquence, broad views and powers of organization, but also to the magnetic force of his personality.

In 1887 he went to America in fulfilment of a promise to Henry Ward Beecher of Brooklyn, and received a unanimous invitation to succeed Beecher in what was then the best-known pulpit in the United States. Berry, however, felt that his work lay in England and declined the invitation. In 1892 he took part in a conference at Grindelwald on the question of Christian Reunion, and subsequently, with Hugh Price Hughes and Alexander Mackennal of Bowdon, conducted a campaign throughout England, introducing the ideas and principles of Free Church federation.

He was the first president of the Free Church congress, and in 1897 he was president of the Congregational Union of England and Wales. He played an effective part in expressing the popular desire for peace between England and America in reply to President Cleveland's message on the Venezuelan boundary dispute, and was invited to Washington to preach in connexion with the endeavour to establish an international arbitration treaty.He was twice conferred with the degree of Doctor of Divinity, by Iowa College, United States, in 1893, and by St. Andrews, Scotland, in 1895.

He married 11 August 1875 at the Chapel Street Congregational Church, Southport to Mary Agnes Martin of Osborne, Promenade, Southport, and had two sons and a daughter. His brother, Rev. Peter Rathbone Berry, DD, was minister of Fleetwood Congregational Church, 1874-76.

In 1898 his health began to fail, and he died suddenly on 31 January 1899 while conducting a funeral at the Wesleyan Chapel at Bilston, Staffordshire. His funeral took place on 4 Feb at the Queen Street Church and his remains were interred at Wolverhampton Cemetery. The funeral was attended by the mayor and corporation of Wolverhampton, and by representatives of the churches of all denominations.

His published works consist chiefly of addresses, and two volumes of sermons, Vision and Duty, and Mischievous Goodness.
