= Myvanwy Rhys =

Welsh suffragist and historian (1874–1945)

- Born: 1 August 1874; Rhyl, Wales
- Died: 28 November 1945 (aged 71); Oxford, England
- Education: Oxford High School for Girls (1884–1890), Bangor University, Newnham College, Cambridge, Trinity College, Dublin (ad eundem BA, 1905)
- Known for: Support for women's suffrage and history research
- Parent(s): John Rhŷs (father), Elspeth Hughes-Davies (mother)
- Relatives: Olwen Rhys (sister)

Myvanwy Rhys (1 August 1874 – 28 November 1945), also spelled Myfanwy Rhŷs, was a Welsh suffragist and historian. She was elected to the Honourable Society of Cymmrodorion, a Welsh learned society, later becoming a vice-president of the society.

== Education ==
Rhys' parents played a role in her early education – an 1881 article in the Carnarvon and Denbigh Herald discussed the reading lessons Rhys and her sister Olwen were given by their parents while living in Llanberis, North Wales. Her mother, Elspeth Hughes-Davies, educated the children at home during their early years, particularly in languages.

After her family moved to Oxford, Rhys attended the Oxford High School for Girls between 1884 and 1890. She won the Ada Max Müller German Scholarship there when she was 15 years old, according to an article in The Monthly Tidings (a Welsh monthly publication for Calvinistic Methodists) in March 1891. Rhys reportedly won the scholarship two years in a row. The scholarship was named after Ada Max Müller, daughter of Georgiana Adelaide Müller (who would later chair the Oxford Anti-Suffrage Society) and Max Müller (a German-born British philologist), who predeceased her parents in 1876 at 15 years old.

Rhys later won the Gold Medal from The Society for French Teachers in England for her performance in an examination on French language and literature. The medal was presented in a ceremony at the Guildhall in London by the Lady Mayoress of London in the presence of the Lord Mayor and French ambassador. This was published in an article in the Welsh-language political newspaper, Cymru fydd (English: The Wales to Come), which reported that Myvanwy was 'head of the school' in her academic performance by 1890, with a 200-point lead. The article praised her, saying that "Wales would be blessed with many girls like Myfanwy Rhŷs".

She went on to study Latin and Greek at the University College of North Wales (now known as Bangor University) in 1891, living at the women's hall there. The university's magazine states that she was elected as a member of the magazine committee and the women-student's common room, as it was then known, in 1892. An article in The North Wales Express from 8 July 1892 reported that she passed her Latin and Greek exams that year. However, the scandal that surrounded the "Bangor dispute" led to her being removed from the course by her family before she had completed it.

The Bangor dispute arose from concerns surrounding the conduct of Violet Osborn, a friend of Myvanwy's and fellow student at the University who lived outside of the women's halls. Osborn's conduct and claims that a male professor had "treated her with familiarity" had raised concerns from the head of the halls, Frances Hughes, over Osborn's intent. Hughes confided in Rhys' mother, Elspeth. The dispute was widely publicised, including in The Times. The university senate deemed that Osborn's conduct had been "refined and honourable" and, as a consequence, Hughes was asked either to resign or face dismissal from the committee managing the halls. The committee's refusal to do so led to the withdrawal of recognition from the women's hall.

Rhys was admitted to Newnham College, Cambridge, to read for the classical tripos. In 1895, she won a scholarship. She attained first-class honours in her exams but the University of Cambridge did not grant degrees to women at this time, preventing her from receiving the degree she had earned. As a result, she travelled to Trinity College, Dublin, in 1905 to receive her classics degree ad eundem as one of the steamboat ladies.

In 1900, Rhys won the Gibson Greek Testament prize at Newnham College, Cambridge, for an essay she wrote about "the New Testament conception of the Logos, its sources and contents". By February 1900, she was studying in Paris, according to an article in The Aberystwyth Observer.

== Suffragist ==
Rhys was the first honorary secretary of the Oxford Women’s Suffrage Society (OWSS), founded in 1904. She frequently attended its committee meetings, held every fortnight, and was on the society's committee until November 1912 when her sister, Olwen, replaced her.

As part of a National Union of Women's Suffrage Societies demonstration, she was one of the delegation who carried the OWSS banner from the Embankment to the Royal Albert Hall in 1908. The demonstration aimed to raise awareness of the suffrage movement and to show the number of women who supported the cause at the time. After the delegation arrived at the Albert Hall, Rhys presented a bouquet of irises to Millicent Fawcett, a prominent campaigner for women's suffrage in England and leader of the National Union of Women's Suffrage Societies from 1897 until 1919.

== Academic career ==
Rhys was also known for her research on Medieval history. Her research on folksong was published in The Nation, a progressive weekly publication, in 1907. In the same year, she published a review of The Founders of the New Devotion by Thomas à Kempis in The Hibbert Journal. By 1911, she was a researcher in history, living at the Principal's Lodgings at Jesus College, Oxford, with her family, according to that year's census.

In 1930, she was elected to the council of the Honourable Society of Cymmrodorion (a Welsh learned society) and became its vice-president several years later. Her research on ministers' accounts for West Wales (1277–1306) was published in 1936 for the Cymmrodorion Record Series in a volume of around 500 pages.

By 1939, Rhys continued research into Medieval Calendars of Inquisition Post Mortem, but her diary discusses concerns over the likelihood that it would not reach publication. After her death in 1945, she had also left drafts of a manuscript for a biography of her father, Sir John, as the product of research she had conducted into her father's life but it was never published.

== Personal life ==
Myvanwy Rhys was born on 1 August 1874 in Rhyl, North Wales, to John Rhŷs (a Welsh scholar who would later become principal of Jesus College, Oxford) and Elspeth Hughes-Davies (a Welsh teacher and suffragist). Her sister, Olwen, was born in 1876 and it is said that the sisters remained "remarkably close throughout their lives".

A car knocked Rhys down in the summer of 1945 and she had to spend several weeks in hospital, as a result. She died on 28 November 1945. Her death was noted in the "Report of the Council" in the Transactions of the Honourable Society of Cymmrodorion, with particular mention of her work on "Ministers Accounts for West Wales 1277-1306".
