= Pembrokeshire Bank =

Former Welsh bank

This bank was operating in Pembrokeshire, in Wales during the early 19th century. It became bankrupt in 1826.

== Origins ==
The date of establishment of the Bank is unknown, but the London Directory indicates that the business was in operation from 1811 to 1827, inclusive. The style of the partnership operating the Bank was David Saer, Benjamin Thomas, William Mathias & Co. The Bank also had a subsidiary in Narberth, known as the Narberth and Pembrokeshire Bank. The Bank and its subsidiary failed and became bankrupt a year after the Panic of 1825.

== Re-use of name ==
The Pembrokeshire Bank name was acquired by the partnership of John & William Walters of Haverfordwest in 1827. John Walters, was born near Pontardulais, on the Carmarthenshire side of the county boundary. Together with his son, William Walters, they had been partners in the banking business of Walters, Voss and Walters in Swansea. The new Pembrokeshire Bank was located in the centre of the lower end of High Street, Haverfordwest, known as Short Row, and since pulled down. Later on, the Bank moved, successively, to three other buildings on the High Street.

John Walters died shortly after the establishment of the new Pembroke Bank, and William Walters carried on the business by himself.

Branches were opened in Narberth, in 1863, Milford Haven, and Pembroke Dock. After the death of William Walters, on 20 December 1872, his estate was disposed of by his trustees, on behalf of his 15-year-old son, William Howell Walters. The Bank and leasehold premises at Haverfordwest and Narberth were sold to the London and Provincial Bank Ltd. The purchase price was calculated on a sliding scale according to the increase in the total deposits and credit balances at the different branches of the purchasing bank in Pembrokeshire on 1 January the following year. London and Provincial Bank Ltd. was absorbed by London Provincial and South Western Bank Ltd., which became part of Barclays Bank

William Walters was sheriff for Pembrokeshire in 1866. William Howell Walters became sheriff for Pembrokeshire in 1898, and a justice of the peace for Haverfordwest and Pembrokeshire.

== Bank notes ==
The earliest bank note in existence for the old Pembrokeshire Bank is for £1 and is dated 8 December 1825. It is embellished with a view of Pembroke Castle. A bank note for the Narberth and Pembrokeshire Bank is in existence for £1, dated 1 October 1824. It bears an illustration of two yoked oxen. Both bank notes have a memorandum stamped across their face stating that each note was exhibited on 22 July and 24 July 1826, respectively, under a commission of bankruptcy against the named partners in the Pembrokeshire Bank.

The new Pembrokeshire Bank used on its bank notes the same view of Pembroke Castle previously used by the old Pembrokeshire Bank. However, because the new Pembrokeshire Bank was absorbed by the London and Provincial Bank Ltd., instead of being wound up, its bank notes are very rare. The Institute of Bankers hold a £5 bank note. The only other bank note known to exist is for £5, and is dated 1 July 1863. In both notes, the portion bearing the signature has been cut off.

== Other Pembrokeshire banks ==
Other Pembrokeshire banks include: Haverfordwest Bank, J. Dunn & Co., Tenby, Union Bank (Pembrokeshire), Milford Bank, Milford and Pembrokeshire Bank, and Lock, Hulme & Co.
