= Union Bank (Pembrokeshire) =

Union Bank was a bank operated by the firm of Bateman & Co. and it is listed in the London Directory for 1807. However, the date of establishment of the bank is unknown.

By December 1813, bank notes indicate that the business was being carried on under the style of Mathias, Lloyd, & Bowen. The partners were John Mathias, of Prendergast, Pembrokeshire, and Herbert Lloyd and Thomas Bowen, both of Haverfordwest.

By 1814, the bank appears to have been in difficulties, as John Mathias mortgaged certain bills of exchange held by John Evans of Bristol to secure any bills drawn by the firm not exceeding £3000 in value. Herbert Lloyd died around the beginning of 1816 and the bank was carried on by the surviving partners until it was declared bankrupt in May, 1816.

== Bank notes ==
Only three bank notes of this bank are in existence, both for £1 1s. and are dated 1813. Both notes are signed by Thomas Bowen for Mathias Lloyd and Bowen.

== Other Pembrokeshire banks ==
Other Pembrokeshire banks include: Haverfordwest Bank, J. Dunn & Co., Tenby, Milford and Pembrokeshire Bank, Milford Bank, Pembrokeshire Bank, and Lock, Hulme & Co.
