= Cerddor y Tonic Sol-ffa =

19th-century monthly Welsh language magazine

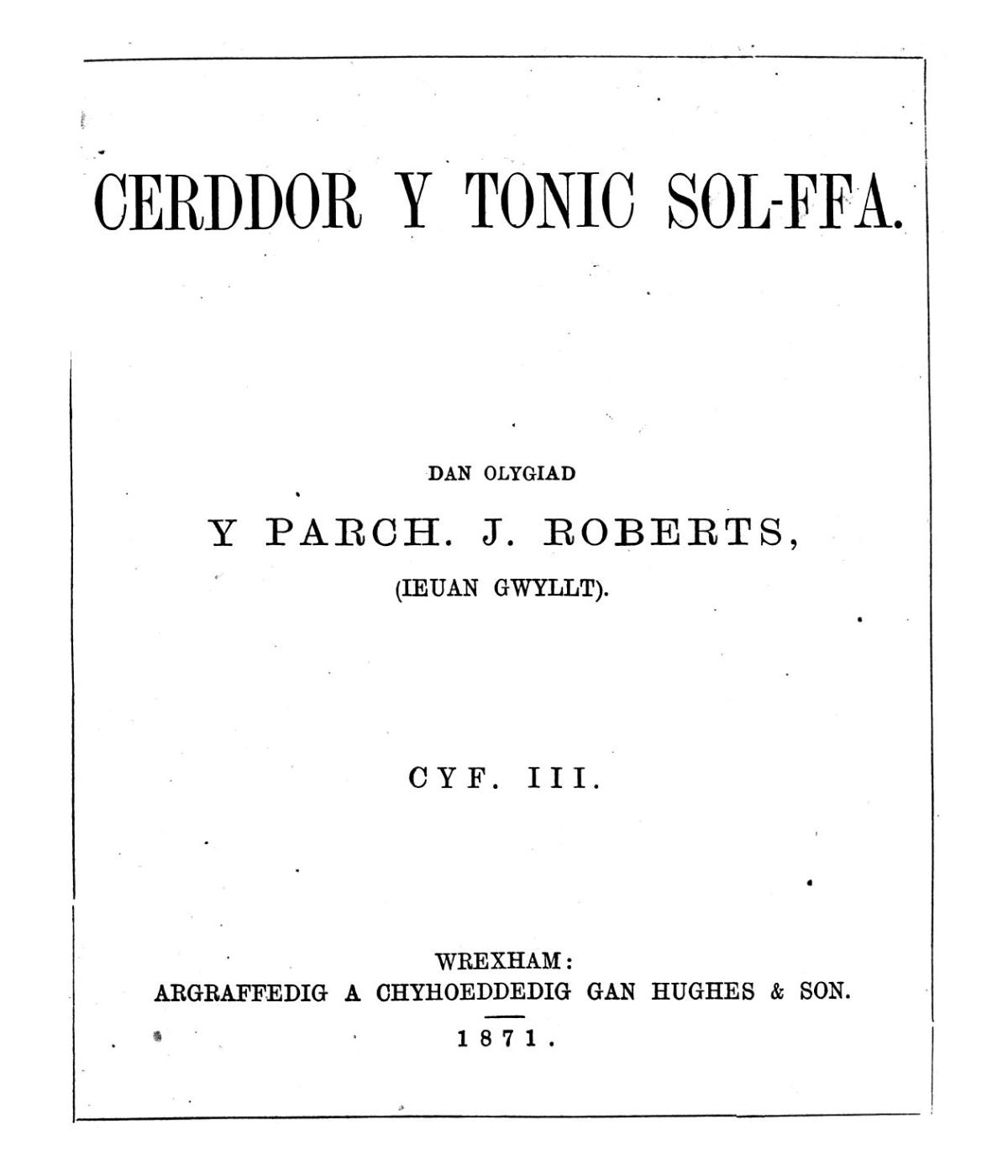
Cerddor y tonic sol-ffa (Welsh Journal)

Cerddor y Tonic Sol-ffa was a 19th-century monthly Welsh language magazine. It was first published by R. Hughes and Son in Wrexham in 1869 when it was edited by its founder, Methodist minister and musician John Roberts (also an editor of 'Y Cerddor Cymreig' and of 'Y Goleuad'). He had studied tonic sol-fa since 1863, and the publication, which contained compositions, and articles about music and musicians, was intended for use by the students during tonic sol-fa lessons.
