= Hugh Price Hughes =

Welsh Methodist reformer (1847–1902)

The Reverend Hugh Price Hughes
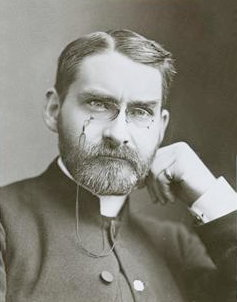

President of the Methodist Conference
- In office 1898–1899
- Preceded by: William L Watkinson
- Succeeded by: John Edward Radcliffe

Personal details
- Born: 8 February 1847 Carmarthen, Wales
- Died: 17 November 1902 (aged 55) London
- Occupation: Wesleyan Methodist Church; Superintendent of the West London Methodist Mission

Hugh Price Hughes (8 February 1847 – 17 November 1902) was a Welsh Methodist minister and religious reformer. He served in multiple leadership roles in the Wesleyan Methodist Church. He organised the West London Methodist Mission, a key Methodist organisation today. Recognised as one of the greatest orators of his era, Hughes also founded and edited an influential newspaper, the Methodist Times in 1885. His editorials helped convince Methodists to break their longstanding support for the Conservatives and support the more moralistic Liberal Party, which other Nonconformist Protestants already supported.

== Biography ==
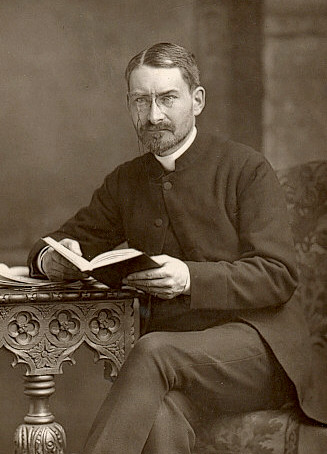
Photograph, c. 1880s

Hughes was born in Carmarthen, and was educated at Richmond Theological College and University College London. His sisters were Frances Hughes and the teacher Elizabeth Phillips Hughes. He was appointed to the Dover Methodist circuit in 1869 moving to Brighton a year later. In 1885, he founded the Methodist Times, and in 1887 he was appointed Superintendent of the West London Methodist Mission. His wife Katherine organised and led the innovative Sisters of the People, social work volunteers attached to the West London Mission.

In 1893 he came to the aid of his sister Frances Hughes who had been employed as the head of the Women's hall of residence for Bangor University. She found herself central to a national debate concerning her comments to Elspeth Rhys about her daughter's visits to a student named Violet Osborn. She was said to have questioned Osborn's integrity and intentions. Violet Osborn heard of this conversation and appealed to the University Senate. The Senate stood by Violet Osborn and the governors of the halls of residence backed Frances. Hugh Price Hughes wrote to The Times in 1893 pointing out that his sister Frances had been mistreated. He supported her view that students who decided to opt-in to staying at hall should not mix with those who opted-out. He added to the fuss by using the phrase "unattached" to refer to women students who were not in hall. The implications of the term implied a lack of supervision and the college objected. However the term "unattached" was re-used by the media as they continued to report the matter.

In 1896, he was elected first president of the National Council of Evangelical Free Churches, an organisation he helped create. In 1898, he was elected President of the Wesleyan Methodist Conference for a year-long term.

Hughes rose as the leader of the "Forward Movement" in Methodism, which sought to reshape the Methodist Church as the moral and social conscience of Britain. Later, he extended this idea to the Nonconformist Free Churches as a whole. He was concerned that the non-Anglican evangelical tradition had become overly focused on individual salvation, and it was time for Methodists, Baptists, Congregationalists, Presbyterians and Quakers to become churches in a fuller sense, taking on responsibility for the salvation of society. These ideas were expressed in his published sermons. In his first book of sermons, entitled Social Christianity, he declared "It is because the spirit of Christ has not been introduced into public life that Europe is in a perilous condition today... My wish is to apply Christianity to every aspect of life."

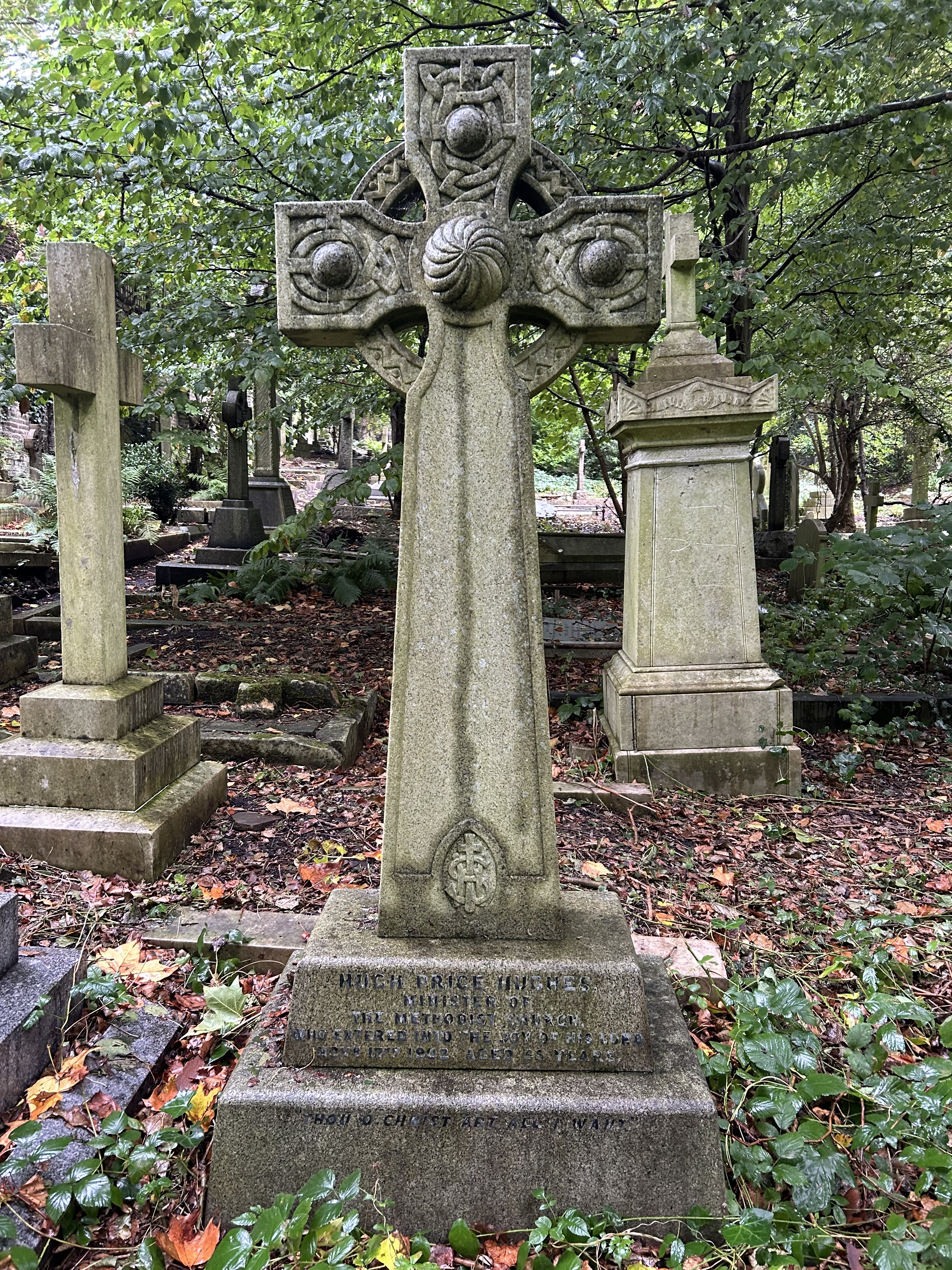
Grave of Hugh Price Hughes in Highgate Cemetery

Hughes played a key role in leading Methodists into the Liberal Party coalition, away from the Conservative leanings of previous Methodist leaders. His activism embodied the concept of the "Nonconformist conscience". As a reformer, Hughes was a leader for temperance and for the repeal of the Contagious Diseases Acts. He was also a strong advocate for public, non-sectarian education and international peace. He strongly supported Gladstone's Irish Home Rule Bills. After the Irish nationalist leader Charles Stewart Parnell was revealed to have committed adultery with Katharine O'Shea, Hughes declared that English Nonconformists would no longer support the Irish cause if its leader was a proven adulterer. This threat led Gladstone to state that he could not remain as Liberal leader if Parnell continued to lead the Nationalists, thus precipitating the Parnell Split.

He died at his home in London following a stroke and was buried on the west side of Highgate Cemetery.

== Family ==
On 20 August 1873, he married Mary Katherine Howard, daughter of the Rev. Alfred Barrett, governor of Richmond Theological College; they had two sons and two daughters. Their daughter Dorothea Katherine Price Hughes was one of the first women admitted to degrees at the University of Oxford, earning a BA and MA from Somerville College in 1920. She was the author of a biography of her father.

== Associated activists in social change ==
- Emmeline Pethick-Lawrence
- Mark Guy Pearse
- Henry Simpson Lunn
- Charles Albert Berry
- Percy William Bunting
- John Greener Hallimond.

According to "A Countess at the Bowery Mission: The Christian Herald And Signs of Our Times", 20 December 1899, page 987: "Nine years ago, he [Hallimond] was connected with the great West London Mission, England, of which Rev. Hugh Price Hughes is Superintendent." This is repeated in "Great Heart of the Bowery: Leaves from the Life-Story of John G. Hallimond, late Superintendent of the Bowery Mission," Fleming H. Revell, NY: 1925. In the biographical foreword by George H. Sandison of Christian Herald, "Nine years before he came to America he was connected with the great West London Mission, of which Rev. Hugh Price Hughes was Superintendent" (page 13).

== Bibliography ==
- Hughes, Hugh Price (1901). THE MORNING LANDS OF HISTORY. London: Horace Marshall.
