= External degree =

Academic degree that can be earned remotely

An external degree is a degree offered by a university to students who have not been required to be physically present within the geographic territory of the institution. These undergraduates may be called external students and may study at classes unconnected with the university, or independently, or by distance learning. They may obtain the degree by passing examinations once they have reached the required standard, or by having successfully completed a programme put together from various courses or modules.

== History ==
In 1858, the University of London became the first English university to offer external degrees, holding exams open to people in other cities, or to London students who had attended evening classes. In various UK towns, university colleges were established, where students could study towards a London external degree. The colleges were among the "approved centres" for London's exams. Soon centres overseas were approved, starting with one in Mauritius in 1865.

== See also ==
- Lady Literate in Arts
- Excelsior University
- Charter Oak State College
- Thomas Edison State University
