= Ponterwyd =

Village in Ceredigion, Wales

Coordinates: 52°24′42″N 3°50′24″W

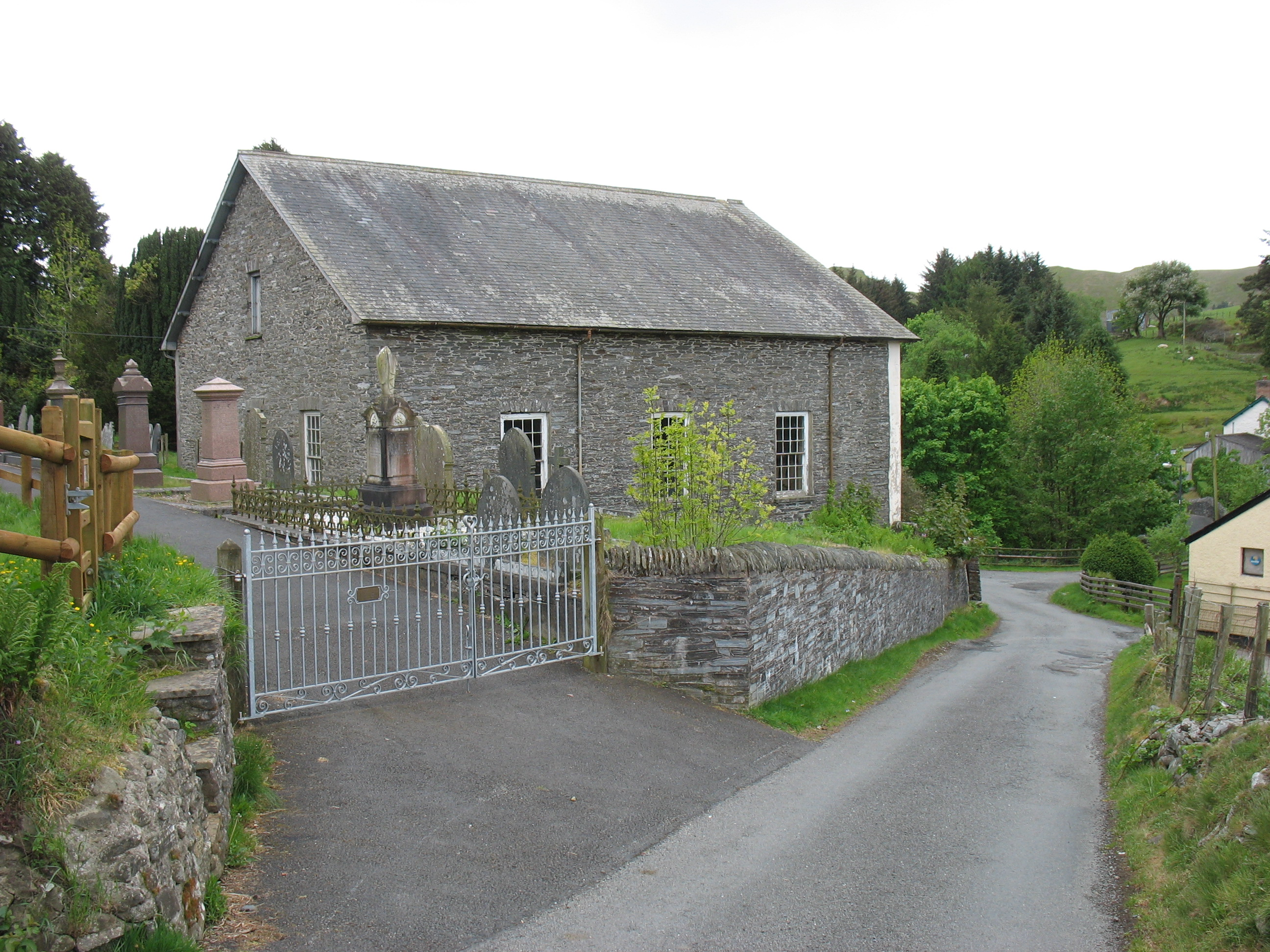
The old chapel, Ponterwyd

The National Forest for Wales at Bwlch Nant yr Arian

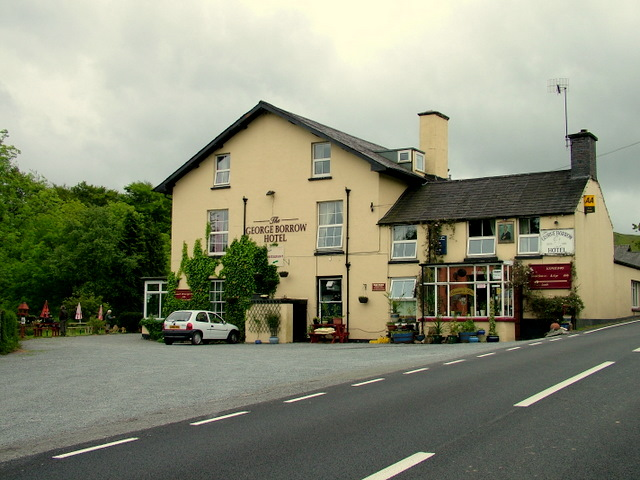
The George Borrow Hotel

Ponterwyd (Welsh pronunciation: [pɔntˈerʊi̯d]) is a village in Ceredigion, Wales. It lies in the Cambrian Mountains of Mid Wales, approximately 12 miles (19 km) east of Aberystwyth on the A44 road.

== History ==
At the village's heart lies Yr Hen Bont (English: The Old Bridge), a steep single-arch late 18th-century stone bridge over the Afon Rheidol river, which is adjacent to a late Georgian chapel. Buildings in Ponterwyd range in date from the Georgian period to the 1980s, when a development of bungalows named 'Penlon' was added to the village. The village pub, "The George Borrow Hotel", is named after the writer George Borrow, who travelled through Wales on foot in the 1860s.

The scholar John Rhŷs was born in Ponterwyd in 1840, and the composer Albert Alan Owen lived there for over thirty years.

== Nature ==
The village is the home of Bwlch Nant yr Arian, a Natural Resources Wales centre where up to 150 red kites are fed daily.
