= Owen Picton Davies (journalist) =

Welsh journalist (1882–1970)

Owen Picton Davies (6 June 1882 – 10 October 1970) was a Welsh journalist.

== Early life ==
He was born in Trimsaran, Carmarthenshire, but soon after his birth his parents moved to Morlogws Uchaf (parish of Cilrhedyn), where he grew up. He studied at Pen-y-waun school and the Old College School in Carmarthen.

== Career ==
In 1898, he worked at the Carmarthen Journal as an apprentice. Three years later, he began working at the Western Mail as a correspondent, having moved to the Rhondda Valley. In 1903, he moved to Cardiff to work as a sub-editor, before, in 1907, moving to Caernarfon as editor of Yr Herald Cymraeg and the Carnarvon and Denbigh Herald.

He became sub-editor of the Western Mail in 1914. Later, he was employed at The Weekly Mail as editor. He returned to the Western Mail, where he trained journalists as Director of Studies, beginning in 1949. He retired in 1952.

Over his career, he wrote about Welsh literature and history, as well as the inception of the radio industry. In 1962, he published Atgofion Dyn Papur Newydd, a memoir. He died in October 1970.
