= Olwen Rhys =

Welsh scholar and suffragist

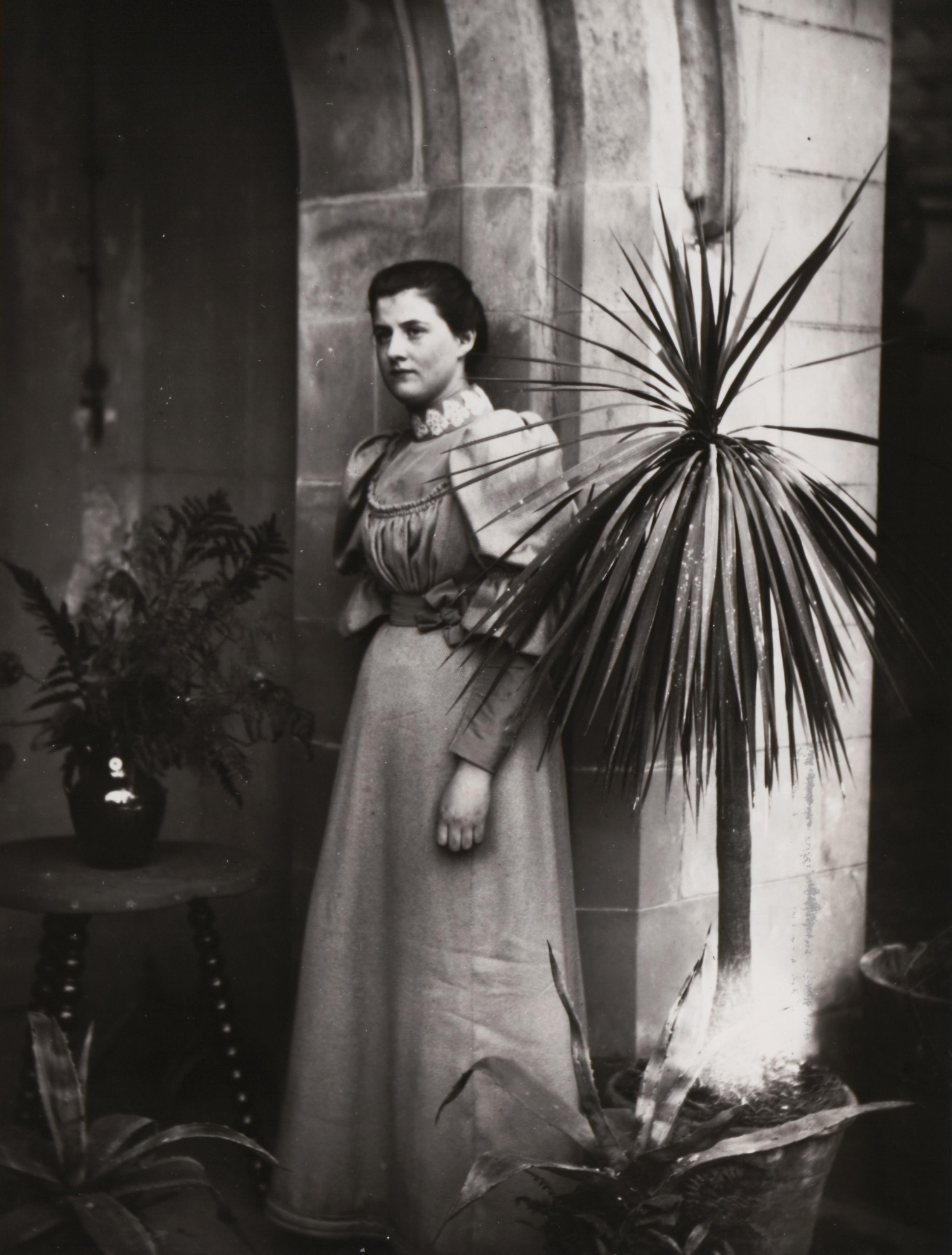
- Born: 4 March 1876; North Wales
- Died: 10 April 1953 (aged 77); Southsea, England
- Education: Oxford High School for Girls (1884–1893), University of Oxford (MA, 1924)
- Known for: Support for women's suffrage and scholarship
- Parents: John Rhŷs (father); Elspeth Hughes-Davies (mother)
- Relatives: Myvanwy Rhys (sister)

Olwen Rhys (4 March 1876 – 10 April 1953), also spelled Olwen Rhŷs, was a Welsh scholar and suffragist. She was a member of and later a lecturer for the Society of Oxford Home Students, which would go on to become St Anne's College, Oxford. In her honour, an Olwen Rhys Fellowship for graduate research was established at St Anne's College, Oxford.

== Education and academic career ==
After early education at home and at a convent school in France, Olwen went to the Oxford High School for Girls between 1884 and 1893. While a student there, she received awards for her linguistic performance, including an Ada Max Müller scholarship for German proficiency, the best marks in the country for her Higher Certificate of French, and the Gold Medal from the National Society for French Teachers.

She went on to become a lifetime member of the Society of Oxford Home Students (SOHS), which would later become St Anne's College in 1952, shortly before her death. In modern languages exams she took at Oxford in 1898, Rhys was highly commended. In 1901, Rhŷs received first class honours in Modern Languages when taking the university's women's exams but the University of Oxford would not grant degrees to women until 1920.

Rhys did not receive her MA in modern languages until 1924, after taking another series of examinations at Oxford, while living with her parents at the Principal's Lodgings in Jesus College. By this time, she had been working as a French tutor for the SOHS for around 20 years and as an examiner in French for the Central Welsh Board (a Welsh exam board) since 1904. Rhys became the first Home-Student to be appointed as an examiner for the University of Oxford in 1925, and, in 1929, was appointed as a French lecturer for the SOHS - a position she retained until 1946.

Rhys was also known as a scholar in Anglo-Norman history and edited various Anglo-Norman texts. For example, in 1946 together with Sir John Fox, she published an edition of a rhymed apocalypse for the Anglo-Norman Text Society.

== Suffrage and war service ==
Rhys served as secretary to the committee of the Oxford Women's Suffrage Society (OWSS), which often held meetings in her family's home. She is described as having been an "active suffragist" in a 2018 publication for the University of Oxford that marked the centenary of votes for women. In 1916, she represented her local area at a National Union of Women's Suffrage Societies council meeting in Chelsea.

Through the OWSS, she served in Europe in hospitals, hostels for refugees, and canteens during World War I. For example, she assisted Belgian soldiers and helped to provide entertainments for their wives through the OWSS and Commission for Relief in Belgium.

In 1916, Rhys denied the opportunity of becoming a temporary bursar at Somerville College, Oxford to volunteer in relief work for French war victims at the Hotel Bellevue in Samoëns, with her friend Eden Lewis, also a suffragist. While there, she was offered the position of director by Dr Hilda Clark, according to Clark's diaries.

== Personal life ==
Rhys was born on 4 March 1876 to John Rhŷs and Elspeth Hughes-Davies in North Wales. Her elder sister Myvanwy had been born on 1 August 1874 and the sisters were thought to have remained "close throughout their lives." Both her parents were native Welsh-speakers, and the family was known for its interest both in languages, as well as for their support for liberal and suffragist causes.

In 1877, the Rhŷs family moved to Oxford when John Rhŷs became the first Professor of Celtic at Jesus College, Oxford. By 1895, Olwen was living in the Principal's Lodgings at Jesus College after John became Principal of the college. Shortly after, in 1896, Rhys was noted as "one of the most accomplished lady cyclists in the city of the Isis" by an article in the Newspaper South Wales Daily News. Rhys continued to live at the Principal's Lodgings until her father John's death in 1915, having living in Jesus College for around 20 years. At his funeral, she was the chief mourner according to an article for the Welsh-language newspaper Tarian Y Gweithiwr (English: The Worker's Shield).

On 10 April 1953 Olwen died in Southsea at the age of 77. After her death, an Olwen Rhys Fellowship was established for graduate students at St Anne's College, Oxford and her will left £1000 to the college for research in Medieval romance languages and literature or Medieval history. An obituary by M.F Appleby in The Times described her as "the personification of Oxford."
