= Haverfordwest Bank =

Haverfordwest Bank is a defunct Welsh bank which was located in Haverfordwest, Pembrokeshire. It was established in the 18th century by a Jewish entrepreneur who settled in Wales.

== History ==
The bank was founded by Samuel Levi Phillips (c.1730-1812), who arrived with his brother, Moses Levi Philips, in Haverfordwest in the middle of the eighteenth century. Their ancestral home was the city of Frankfurt-am-Main in Germany. They adopted the surname Phillips, after being befriended by a gentleman of that name in Haverfordwest, and were baptized in St Mary's Church, Haverfordwest, in 1755/1756. Samuel Levi Phillips married twice and had nine children. The marriages and children’s baptisms are recorded at St. Mary’s Church. His second son, Nathaniel Phillips, succeeded in the banking business.

The date of establishment of the bank is unknown, but it was in existence in 1817 and was operated by the firm of S. L. Phillips, Son, & Co., and was thereafter operated by the firm of Nathaniel Phillips.

The bank was located in High Street, Haverfordwest.

== Connection with Milford and Pembrokeshire Bank ==
Samuel Levi Philips bequeathed to his first son, Philip, the sum of £1000 ‘advanced as my part of the capital joint stock in the new Milford Bank, as one of the co-partners therein.’ The bank was probably the Milford and Pembrokeshire Bank.

== Other Pembrokeshire banks ==
Other Pembrokeshire banks include: J. Dunne & Co., Tenby, Union Bank (Pembrokeshire), Milford and Pembrokeshire Bank, Milford Bank, Pembrokeshire Bank, and Lock, Hulme & Co.
