= Sarah Bannister =

Educationist and politician (1858–1942)

- Born: Sarah Jane Stourton; August 5, 1858; Norton St Philip
- Died: March 16, 1942 (aged 83); Golders Green
- Occupations: educationist and local politician
- Employer: University of St Andrews
- Spouse: Henry Bannister

Sarah Bannister LLA born Sarah Jane Stourton (August 5, 1858 – March 16, 1942) was a British educationist, school inspector and district councillor. She and her husband were involved with the pupil-teacher scheme in London. She served for twenty years as a district councillor in Hendon. She was creditted with creating Hendon Free Library.

== Life ==
Bannister was born in 1858 in Norton St Philip in Somerset. Her parents were Harriet (born Moon) and John Stourton. Her father was a journeyman mason.

In December 1881 she became the second wife of Henry Bannister who was a widower. Her husband worked for the London School Board (LSB) and in the following month she was made a school inspector and she started teaching evening classes to pupil-teachers. In 1884 the LSB decided to pilot the idea of teaching pupil-teachers at a central location. Bannister and her husband were asked to carry out the experiment. Bannister became the as headmistress of a girls school based in a room under the Lycett Memorial Methodist Chapel in Stepney. Her husband had a similar position teaching boys at Toynbee Hall.

Bannister studied to become a Lady Literate in Arts via the course offered by the University of St Andrews. She enrolled in 1884 and studied for two years. The pressure of her career is presumed to be the reason that she did not complete it until 1896.

In 1887, she was asked to join an Education Department committee looking at the "Pupil-teacher" system chaired by a senior inspector of schools, Thomas Wetherherd Sharpe. Only three women were asked: Elizabeth Phillips Hughes from Cambridge training college, Lydia Manley of Stockwell training college and Bannister. She was called as a witness but she was very involved in the investigation. The committee's report resulted in a policy that caused the closure of the Pupil-teacher centres, hers included, that had been established.

In 1908 she became the principal of a residential day teacher training college at Moorfields. When that college was merged in 1915 she became an assistant inspector of schools. In 1918 the Hendon Women Citizens' Council encouraged her to become a candidate to become an Urban District Councillor. She was elected in 1918 and served until 1938. She was creditted with creating Hendon Free Library.

Bannister died in 1942 in Golders Green.
