= Free Church Federation =

Free Church Federation is a voluntary association of British Nonconformist churches for cooperation in religious social work. It was the outcome of a unifying tendency displayed during the latter part of the 19th century.

== History ==
About 1890 the proposal that there should be a Nonconformist Church Congress analogous to the Anglican Church Congress was seriously considered, and the first was held in Manchester on 7 November 1892. In the following year it was resolved that the basis of representation should be neither personal (as in the Anglican Church Congress) nor denominational, but territorial. Subsequently, England and Wales were completely covered with a network of local councils, each of which elected its due proportion of representatives to the national gathering. This territorial arrangement eliminated all sectarian distinctions, and also the possibility of committing the different churches as such to any particular policy. The representatives of the local councils attended not as denominationalists but as Evangelical Free Churchmen.

The name of the organization was changed from Congress to National Council as soon as the assembly consisted of duly appointed representatives from the local councils of every part of England. The local councils consisted of representatives of the Congregational and Baptist Churches, the Methodist Churches, the Presbyterian Church of England, the Free Church of England, the Society of Friends, and such other Evangelical churches as the National Council may at any time have admitted. The constitution stated the following as the objects of the National Council:

(a) To facilitate fraternal intercourse and cooperation among the Evangelical Free Churches;
(b) to assist in the organization of local councils;
(c) to encourage devotional fellowship and mutual counsel concerning the spiritual life and religious activities of the Churches;
(d) to advocate the New Testament doctrine of the Church, and to defend the rights of the associated Churches;
(e) to promote the application of the law of Christ in every relation of human life.

Although the objects of the Free Church councils were thus in their nature and spirit religious rather than political, there were occasions on which action was taken on national affairs of significant import. Thus, opposition was offered to the Education Act 1902 (2 Edw. 7. c. 42), and support accorded during the general election of 1906 to those candidates who pledged themselves to altering that measure.

Early in the twentieth century it was recognised that a further mechanism was needed to handle Free Church issues at a denominational level. This was something that the Free Church Council was not established to do. Having seen the process hindered by World War I, the first meeting of the Federal Council of the Evangelical Free Churches took place in October 1919. The two councils then ran on parallel lines until they combined in 1940 to form the Free Church Federal Council to oversee both the local groups and denominational issues.

Although the Free Church Federal Council was not one of the founding interdenominational bodies of the British Council of Churches in 1942, in 1972 a number of member denominations of the Free Church Federal Council were invited into discussions by two of its member denominations, the Presbyterian Church of England and the Congregational Church, that had recently come together to form the United Reformed Church.

The Free Church Federal Council trod a careful path when the ecumenical process Not Strangers but Pilgrims began in 1986, leaving with its member denominations the choice of participating. It was more supportive when the British Council of Churches handed over its activities in September 1990 at the inauguration of the national bodies: Churches Together in England (CTE), Churches Together in Wales (CYTUN), and Action of Churches Together in Scotland (ACTS); and to the 'four-nations' body, Churches Together in Britain and Island. In particular the Free Church Federal Council has from the outset supplied its Moderator to serve as the Free Churches President of CTE alongside the Archbishop of Canterbury and the Cardinal Archbishop of Westminster, and has forged close relationships with CYTUN. It has also offered CTE the use of its premises and seen many of its local groups play a major part in establishing local Churches Together Groups.

In March 2016 the Free Church Federal Council updated its governing documents in order to better serve the interests of the Free Churches Group, the growing body of member denominations that the Free Church Federal Council convenes.

== Service ==
A striking feature of the movement from its outset was the adoption of the parochial system for the purpose of local work. Each of the associated churches was requested to look after a parish, not of course with any attempt to exclude other churches, but as having a special responsibility for those in that area who were not already connected with some existing church. Throughout the United Kingdom local councils were formed into federations, some fifty in number, which were intermediate between them and the National Council. The local councils did what was possible to prevent overlapping and excessive competition between the churches. They also combined the forces of the local churches for evangelistic and general devotional work, open-air services, efforts on behalf of Sunday observance, and the prevention of gambling. Services were arranged in connection with workhouses, hospitals and other public institutions.

Social work of a varied character formed a large part of the operations of the local councils, and the Free Church Girls Guild had a function similar to that of the Anglican Girls' Friendly Society. The National Council engaged in missionary work on a large scale, and a considerable number of periodicals, hymn-books for special occasions, and works of different kinds explaining the history and ideals of the Evangelical Free Churches were published. At its height the churches represented in the National Council had 9,966 ministers, 55,828 local preachers, 407,991 Sunday school teachers, 3,416,377 Sunday scholars, 2,178,221 communicants, and sitting accommodation for 8,555,460 (as of 1911).

A remarkable manifestation of this unprecedented reunion was that a committee of the associated churches prepared and published a catechism expressing the positive and fundamental agreement of all the Evangelical Free Churches on the essential doctrines of Christianity. The catechism represented substantially the creed of not less than 80,000,000 Protestants. It was widely circulated throughout Great Britain, the Commonwealth and the United States of America, and was also translated into Welsh, French, and Italian.

By the time the Free Church Council combined with the Council of Evangelical Free Churches, a strong foundation had been laid for future progress and some significant benefactors came behind the project to make sure that the corporate voice of the Free Churches could continue to be heard. A residential block was built on the north side of Tavistock Square in London to provide an income and a headquarters for the organisation. The work in education continued and member denominations opened the way for ministers of other member denominations to join them in providing chaplaincy, notably the Methodist Church with prison chaplaincy. Member denominations took it in turn to provide a Moderator and the organisation employed a General Secretary and members of staff.

By the time the revised governing documents were adopted in 2016, the Free Church Federal Council had three specialist secretaries, one for Education (including Education chaplaincy), one for Prison Chaplaincy and one for Health Care Chaplaincy, in addition to a General Secretary and support staff. In 2018 it instigated the Free Churches Commission on the Church and Social Cohesion which published its report ‘Connecting Communities and Serving People’ in November 2020 and continues to promote faithful witness in the public square.

== Growth ==
The movement spread to all parts of Australia, New Zealand, South Africa, Jamaica, the U.S., and India. It is perhaps necessary to add that it differs essentially from the Evangelical Alliance, inasmuch as its membership since the formation of the federal council is primarily at a denominational level rather than a congregational or personal level. The essential doctrine of the movement is a particular understanding of the Church which regards the Lord Jesus Christ as the sole and Divine Head of every branch of the Holy Catholic Church throughout the world. For this reason those denominations that do not accept the deity of Christ within a Trinitarian theology are necessarily excluded from membership of the Free Churches Group. At the time of publishing the report of its commission, the total number of member denominations within the Free Churches Group was twenty six: the Methodist Church, the Baptist Union of Great Britain, the United Reformed Church, the Salvation Army, the Assemblies of God, the Congregational Federation, the Baptist Union of Wales, Christ Apostolic Church, Church of God of Prophecy, Church of The Nazarene, Churches in Communities International, the Council of African & Caribbean Churches UK, the Countess of Huntingdon's Connexion, the Fellowship of Churches of Christ, the Free Church of England, the Free Methodist Church, the Independent Methodist Connexion, the Joint Council of Churches for All Nations, the Moravian Church, the New Testament Assembly, the New Testament Church of God, the Old Baptist Union, the Order of St Leonard, the Presbyterian Church of Wales, the Union of Welsh Independents and the Wesleyan Reform Union.

== See also ==
- Free church
- Alexander Mackennal
