= John Rhŷs =

Welsh Celticist (1840–1915)

The Right Honourable Sir John Rhŷs FBA
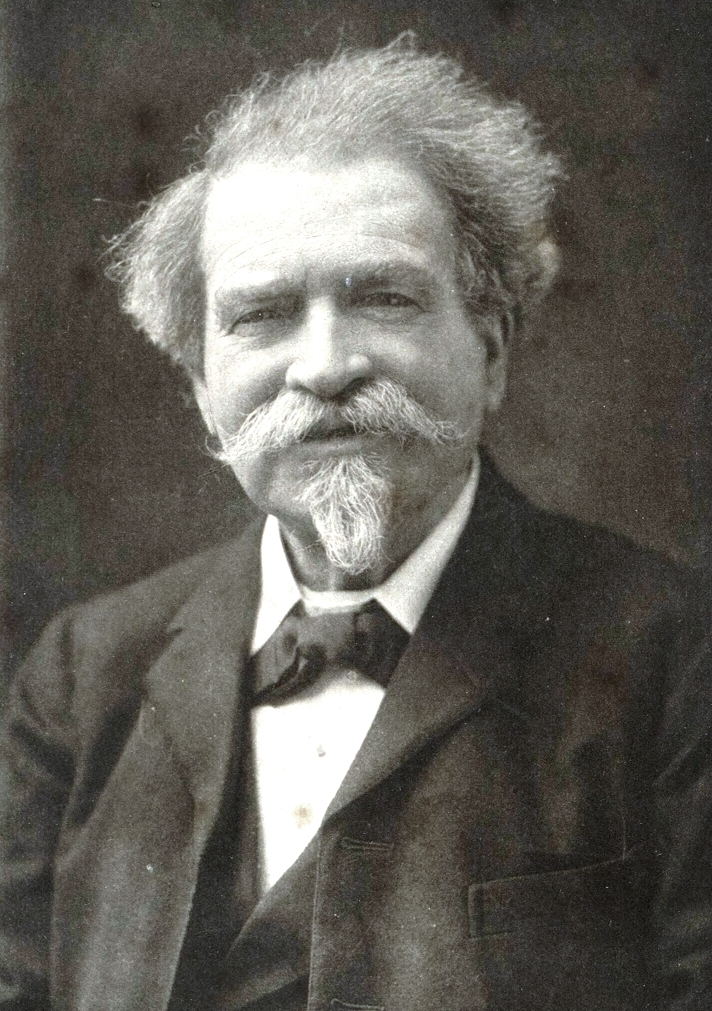
- Born: John Rees; 21 June 1840; Ponterwyd, Ceredigion, Wales
- Died: 17 December 1915 (aged 75); Oxford, England
- Education: Penllwyn British School; Bangor Normal College; Jesus College, Oxford; Merton College, Oxford; Leipzig University
- Occupations: Author; academic; philologist; poet
- Known for: prominent scholar of Celtic studies, first professor of Celtic studies at Oxford University
- Spouse: Elspeth Hughes-Davies (m. 1872; died 1911)
- Children: Myvanwy; Olwen

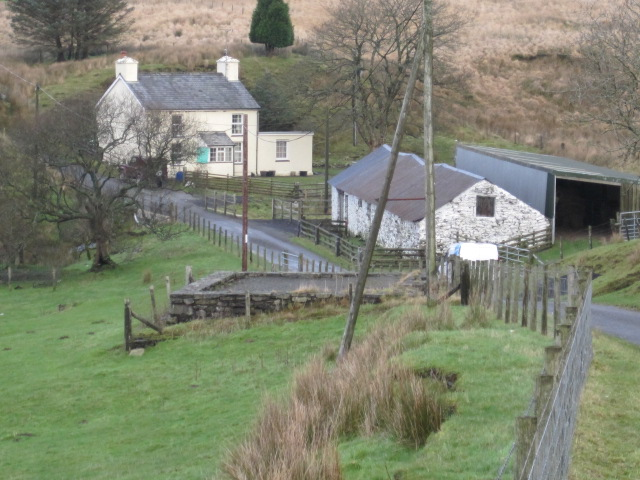
Birthplace of Sir John Rhŷs, Ponterwyd

Sir John Rhŷs FBA (Welsh pronunciation: [ˈr̥ɨːs]; 21 June 1840 – 17 December 1915) was a Welsh Celticist and philologist. A fellow of the British Academy, he served as the first professor of Celtic at Oxford University.

== Early years and education ==
He was born John Rees at Ponterwyd in Ceredigion, to a lead miner and farmer, Hugh Rees, and his wife. Rhŷs was educated at schools in Bryn-chwyth, Pantyffynnon and Ponterwyd before moving to the British School, a recently opened institution at Penllwyn, in 1855. Here Rhŷs was enrolled as a pupil and teacher, and after leaving studied at Bangor Normal College from 1860 to 1861. Upon leaving Bangor Normal College, Rhŷs gained employment as headmaster at Rhos-y-bol, Anglesey. It was here that Rhŷs was introduced to Dr Charles Williams, then the Principal of Jesus College, Oxford, in 1865. This meeting eventually led to Rhŷs being accepted into the college, where he studied literae humaniores. In 1869, he was elected to a fellowship at Merton College.

Rhŷs also travelled and studied in Europe during this period, staying in Paris, Heidelberg, Leipzig, and Göttingen. He attended lectures by Georg Curtius and August Leskien while in Leipzig, and it was during this period that his interest in philology and linguistics developed. Rhŷs matriculated from Leipzig in 1871, and it was around this time that he adopted the Welsh spelling of his name. He returned to Wales as a government inspector of schools, covering Flint and Denbigh, and he settled in Rhyl. Rhŷs also began to write, with articles on the grammar of the Celtic language and articles on the glosses in the Luxembourg manuscript being printed, the latter in the Revue Celtique. In 1872 Rhŷs married Elspeth Hughes-Davies and together they had three children: Gwladus (born 1873, died as an infant), Myvanwy, and Olwen.

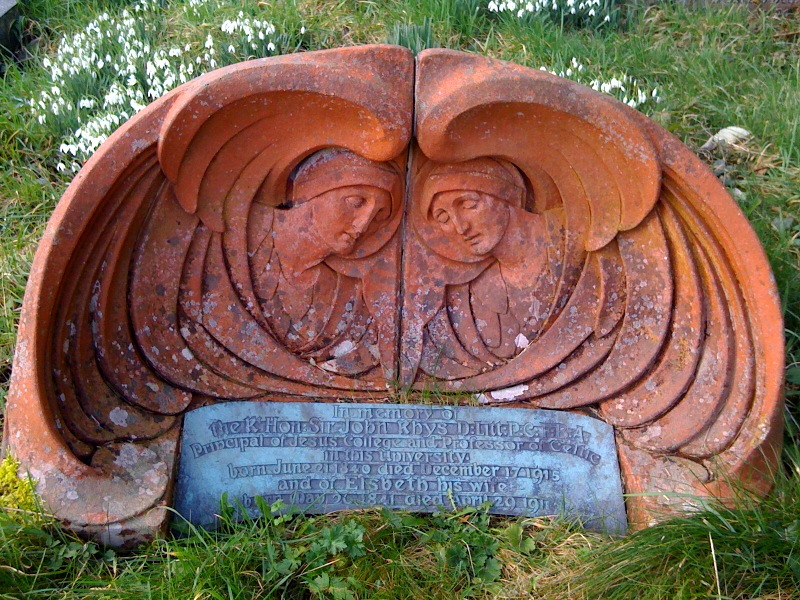
Grave of Rhŷs and his wife Elspeth at Holywell Cemetery, Oxford

== Career ==
In 1874, Rhŷs delivered a series of lectures in Aberystwyth, later published as Lectures on Welsh Philology, which served to establish his reputation as a leading scholar of the Celtic language. This reputation saw him appointed as the first Professor of Celtic at Oxford University in 1877. He was also made a Fellow of Jesus College, Oxford. Rhŷs was elected bursar of the college in 1881, a position he held until 1895, when he succeeded Daniel Harper as principal.

Rhŷs served on several public bodies.

- 1881 – Lord Aberdare's departmental committee on Welsh education
- 1887 – Secretary to the commission on the tithe agitation in Wales
- 1889 – Royal Commission on Sunday closing in Wales
- 1893 – Royal Commission on Land Tenure in Wales
- 1891 – Royal Commission on University Education in Ireland
- 1907 – Sir Thomas Raleigh's commission on the Welsh university and its constituent colleges
- 1908 – Chief Baron Palles's commission for a national university of Ireland
- 1908 – First chairman of the Royal Commission on the Ancient and Historical Monuments of Wales, a post that he held until his death.

== Awards ==
Rhŷs gained his knighthood in 1907, and in 1911 was appointed to the Privy Council. Rhŷs was one of the founding Fellows of The British Academy when it was given its royal charter in 1902, and after his death the academy established an annual lecture in his name, the Sir John Rhŷs Memorial Lecture. The Oxford Dictionary of National Biography declares him to be "foremost among the scholars of his time" in his published fields, noting that "his pioneering studies provided a firm foundation for future Celtic scholarship and research for many decades."

== Works ==
- Lectures on Welsh Philology (1877)
- Celtic Britain (1882, last edition 1908)
- Lectures on the Origin and Growth of Religion as Illustrated by Celtic Heathendom (1888, based on lectures delivered in 1886)
- Studies in the Arthurian Legend (1891)
- Celtic Folklore, Welsh and Manx (1901)
- The Welsh People (with D. B. Jones, 1900)

John Morris-Jones and Rhŷs prepared an edition of The Elucidarium and other tracts in Welsh from Llyvyr agkyr Llandewivrevi A.D. 1346 (The Book of the Anchorite of Llanddewi Brefi), a collection of Medieval Welsh manuscripts in the library of Jesus College Oxford, which they published in 1894. In the 1890s, Rhŷs and his daughter Olwen decoded a Greek and Latin cryptogram in the Juvencus Manuscript.

== The "Bangor dispute" ==
The daughter of Rhŷs and his wife Elspeth, Myfanwy, attended the University College of North Wales in Bangor where she lived at the women's hall. The head of the hall was Frances Hughes and she was concerned that their daughter was leaving the hall to visit Violet Osborn who was a student who had chosen to not live in the hall. She spoke, in confidence, to Elspeth who was a teacher and a prominent campaigner for the education of women. It was against the rules for students staying at the halls to visit students who lived elsewhere and Osborn's character was questioned. News of this conversation spread and Violet Osborn and her supporters were concerned at the implication on her reputation. Frances had expressed doubts about Violet's intentions and her integrity. The hall's governor's asked Frances to explain herself but she refused to reveal her sources. The governors supported Frances when the university senate demanded that the governors should sack her. There was a huge public debate and the senate after issuing an ultimatum withdrew the hall's licence and the hall was obliged to close (while it re-negotiated).
