= Samuel Levi Phillips =

Samuel Levi Phillips, born Samuel Levi (c1730-1812) was a banker and jeweller of Jewish birth who originated from Germany. He was a founder of the first bank in Haverfordwest, Pembrokeshire, namely the Haverfordwest Bank and also the Milford Bank.

== Personal life ==
Samuel Levi was born c. 1730. His place of birth is unknown but the family home is believed to be in Frankfurt-am-Main, Germany. He arrived in London with his brother Moses and they settled in Haverfordwest. They adopted the surname Phillips after a friend of that name and renounced their Jewish faith, being baptised in St Mary's Church, Haverfordwest in 1755/6. He married Dorothy Hood on 11 November 1753 and they had the following children: Elizabeth born 1754, Phillip, (1756), Sarah (1737), Dorothy, (1758), Nathaniel (1761), and John (1762). It is presumed that Dorothy died shortly after John's birth and Samuel remarried to Mary, the daughter of Stephen Jones of Prendagast, Pembrokeshire. With Mary, he had 3 children, Mary born 1764, Lucy (1766) and Stephen Howell (1767).

== Career ==
Samuel was one of the founders of both Haverfordwest Bank and Milford Bank. The date of establishment is believed to be 1783 and in 1817, it was based in High Street, Haverfordwest, operated by S.L. Phillips, Son & Co.

In addition to his banking career, Samuel was listed as a chapman and was described as a jeweller in a lease dated 6 February 1782. He also had an interest in Pesthouse Back where plague victims were taken to convalesce. In 1790 documents still described him as a jeweller. The buying and selling of items made of precious metals also brought cash advances against items and interest was charged on pawned goods. These transactions had naturally led to the establishment of the Haverfordwest Bank, Pembrokeshire’s first bank in 1783.

The bank prospered despite the Napoleonic Wars and political uncertainty with Samuel leaving a significant estate on his death in 1812. His will of 3 July 1811 shows that Samuel bequeathed to his son Phillip a property in Prendergast, together with 3 more houses and property in Milford. This was in addition to £1,000 joint stock in The Milford Bank which continued trading as The Milford and Pembrokeshire Bank. John inherited 6 houses in St Thomas parish. Stephen inherited a leasehold property in Lambeth, Surrey, £100 and £600 in promissory notes. Sarah and Lucy inherited £1,000 each and the grandchildren £100 each with Nathaniel inheriting the residue and succeeding him in the bank. Presumably the other children pre-deceased him. Samuel is buried in St Thomas's churchyard.

The Haverfordwest Bank, in the name of Nathaniel Phillips was wound up after becoming insolvent in 1826, leaving Nathaniel personally responsible for the debts.
