= Elspeth Hughes-Davies =

Welsh teacher, linguist and campaigner for women's suffrage and education

Elspeth Hughes-Davies, Lady Rhŷs
- Born: Elizabeth Hughes-Davies; 26 May 1841; Llanberis, Caernarfonshire, Wales
- Died: 29 April 1911 (aged 69); Oxford, Oxfordshire, England
- Resting place: St Cross Cemetery, Holywell, Oxford
- Other names: Elspeth Rhŷs, Elspeth Hughes
- Education: Borough Road Teacher Training College for Women, University of Paris
- Known for: Teacher, hostess, and campaigner for women's rights
- Spouse: John Rhys (m. 1872)
- Children: 3, including Myvanwy Rhys and Olwen Rhys

Elspeth Hughes-Davies, Lady Rhŷs (26 May 1841 – 29 April 1911), known also as Elspeth Rhŷs, was a Welsh teacher, linguist, and campaigner for women's suffrage and education.

== Education and career ==
Hughes-Davies began her career as a pupil-teacher in North Wales, later progressing to the Borough Road Teacher Training College for Women in London. Afterwards, by 1861, she had been appointed headmistress of the British Girls' School in Amlwch, Anglesey, and was later appointed head of the British School in Broughton, Flintshire (the date this occurred is not known).

In addition to her teaching career in Wales, during travels on the European Continent over several years, Hughes-Davies worked as an English teacher in Boulogne, France. She also studied art in Rome at the studio of Achille Buzzi, a narrative painter, on her travels.

She went on to study languages at the Sorbonne, where she met the French poet Charles de Gaulle. She gave him Welsh lessons in exchange for French lessons. However, with the outbreak of the Franco-Prussian war in 1870, she left Paris and moved to Vienna.

From Vienna, Hughes-Davies wrote a letter to Y Goleuad, a Welsh-language Calvinistic Methodist weekly paper supportive of liberal politics. In the letter, published on 8 October 1870, she discussed her views on the Franco-Prussian war. This received praise from the paper's editor, John Davies. The letter from Vienna was the first of three letters to the paper, with two subsequent letters written from Berlin in 1871.

== Suffragist and campaigner for women's education ==
Elspeth Hughes-Davies was known for her role as a campaigner for women's rights, including suffrage and education. Her daughters, Olwen and Myfanwy, went on to become suffragists, and her husband, John Rhŷs, was also a suffragist. During her husband's time as Principal of Jesus College, Oxford, their home, the Principal's Lodgings, was known as a "centre for suffrage activism".

In 1882, Hughes-Davies (known by then as Mrs Rhys) presided over a discussion on women's education at the National Eisteddfod of Wales in Bala, Gwynedd. There, she said that "the education of women ought not to be regulated by the whims of stupid men." It was reported in The Cambrian, a Welsh newspaper: "Mrs Rhys, in a clever paper, contested the general impression that the amount of education a girl ought to receive was limited.

Hughes-Davies was a member of the Manchester National Society for Women's Suffrage. In 1888, Lydia Becker, an early leader in the society and its first secretary at the time, encouraged Hughes-Davies to apply for its General Committee in a letter. That year, Hughes-Davies also suggested the establishment of an Oxford branch of the Women's Liberal Association, which "championed women's suffrage in the city." She went on to become the vice-president of the Oxford branch and, by 1892, she had become President of the mid-Oxfordshire branch of the Association. In addition, she is said to have corresponded with Liberal MPs and hosted some of them at the family home, including David Lloyd George and his family.

== Marriage and family ==
In 1861, while headmistress of the British Girls' School in Amlwch, Hughes-Davies met John Rhŷs, then headmaster of Rhosybol school. They were engaged for 5 years before marrying on 6 August 1872 at Llanberis Parish Church. They shared an interest in languages and Rhŷs' first gift to Elspeth was said to be a French-German dictionary.

After settling in Rhyl, North Wales, Elspeth and John had 3 daughters together: Gwladus, Myfanwy, and Olwen. Their eldest, Gwladus, born in 1873, died as an infant on 10 June 1874. Myfanwy was born on 1 August 1874, and Olwen was born in 1876.

After her husband was appointed Professor of Celtic at Jesus College, Oxford in 1877, the family moved to Oxford. According to a 2018 publication Oxford Suffrage Women, the Rhys family was "one of the most important and active in Oxford Liberal, women's education and suffrage circles".

In 1895, when he became Principal of Jesus College, the family moved into the Principal's Lodgings at the college, where Hughes-Davies lived until her death in 1911. During the summer vacation, the family returned to Wales annually, including a visit to the National Eisteddfod. Hughes-Davies and her husband were interested in Celtic epigraphy and, while in Wales, they went on trips to search for Ogham inscriptions.

== Death ==
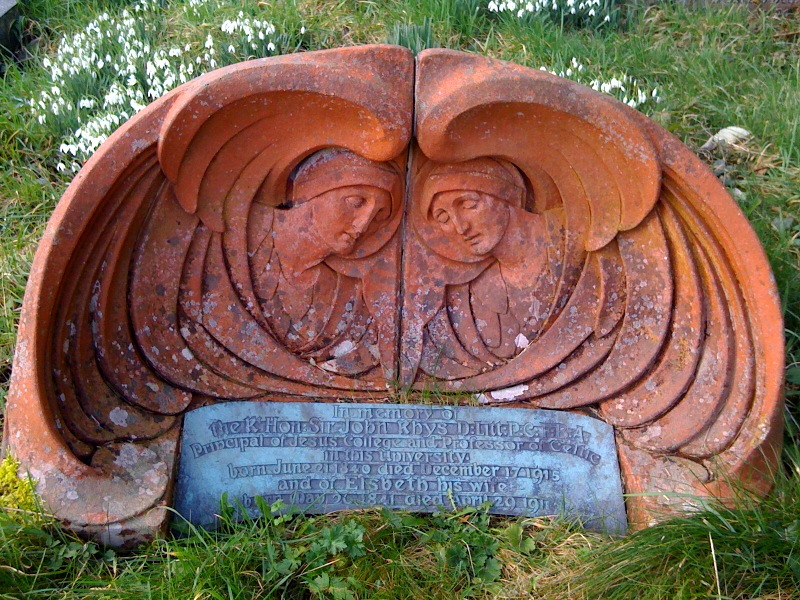
A terracotta monument at Holywell Cemetery, Oxford marking the burial place of Elspeth and her husband, Sir John.

Elspeth Hughes-Davies died in Oxford on 29 April 1911 at the age of 69.

She was buried in Holywell Cemetery, Oxford, where her husband, John, was later buried with her on 23 December 1915 after his death on 17 December. Their grave is marked by a terracotta monument, commissioned by their daughters, Olwen and Myfanwy.

The Welsh-language publication 'Y Gymraes' (English: The Welshwoman) published an obituary for Hughes-Davies in August 1911, written by Professor John Young Evans, and a picture of her was reproduced on the edition's front page.
