= Lady Literate in Arts =

Academic qualification at the University of St Andrews

A Lady Literate in Arts (LLA) qualification was offered by the University of St Andrews in Scotland for more than 12 years before women were allowed to graduate on the same terms as men. It became popular as a kind of external degree for women who had studied through correspondence, or by attendance at non-university classes. Although awarded as a diploma, in comparison to the current/past academic standard, it was equivalent to the Master of Arts.

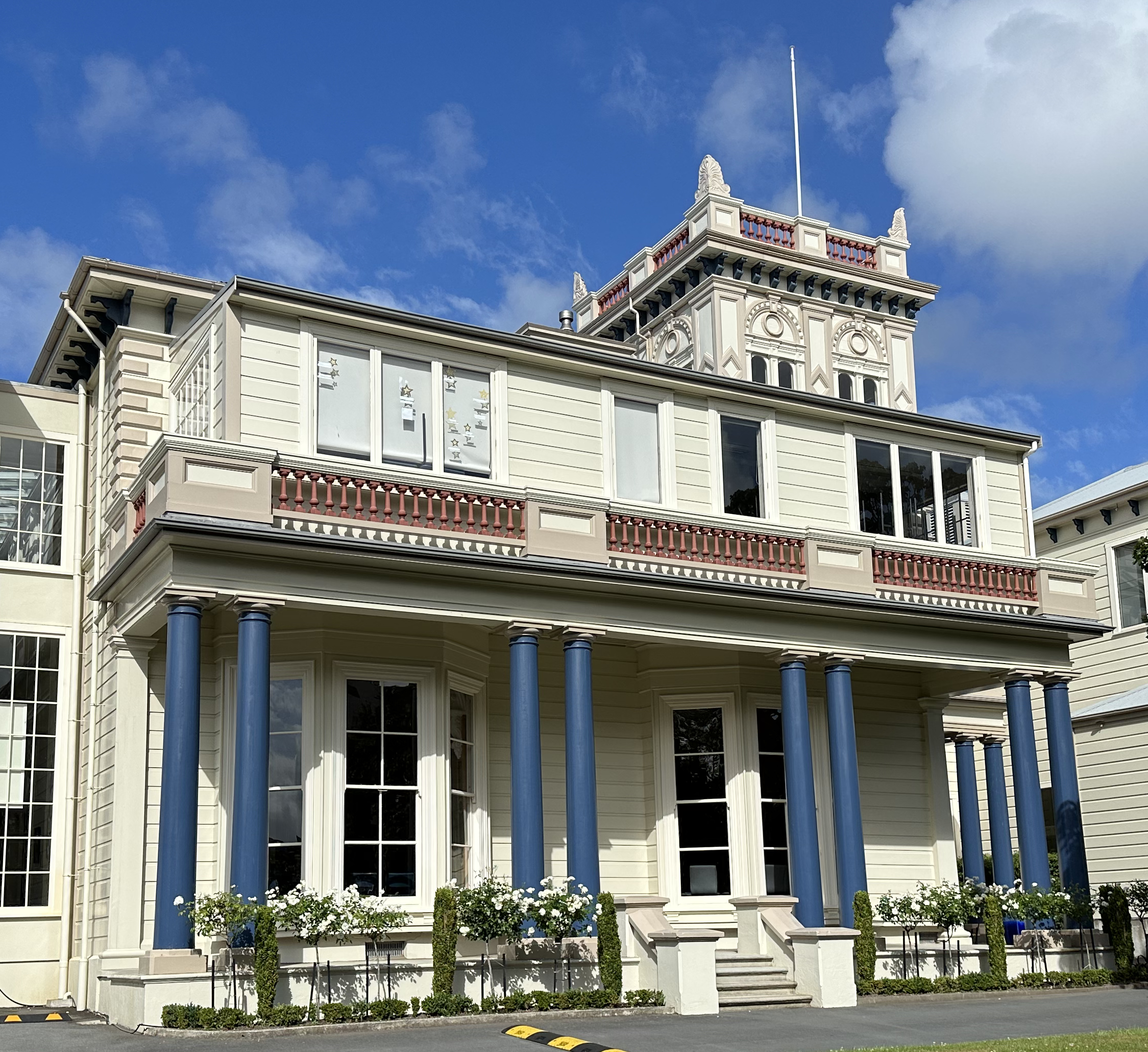
Queen Margaret College

Until 1892, women were not admitted to Scottish universities, and the LLA was the nearest qualification to a degree which was open to women in the country, although the University of Edinburgh offered certificates recognising achievement in classes organised by the Edinburgh Association for the University Education of Women, and Glasgow, Queen Margaret College was offering a university-equivalent education and awards. These specific options did not carry the same recognition or structure as a university level qualification. To obtain an LLA, those who were candidates had to pass examinations at a university-approved centre, which could be located both within Scotland or internationally, which made the program in a way "unusually" accessible for its time.

Formally established in 1877, the LLA allowed women to study a vast range of academic subjects, which included philosophy, mathematics, science, languages, and the arts. This allowed women to gain a level of intellectual training that they had previously been denied throughout history. It allowed women to prove that they were capable/ more than capable of meeting the same academic standard as men, which helped to challenge the continuous inferiority assumptions about the intellectual capacity of women.

Although despite these opportunities that the LLA granted it also brought light to the limitations placed on women. Though it allowed women to study and gain qualifications, it did not grant them full membership in the university. Women could not attend the same lectures as male students, nor participate fully in academic life, or receive an official degree title that was equivalent to a man's. As a result, the LLA functioned as they described, as a "degree in all but name," which reinforced both progress and inequality at the same time.

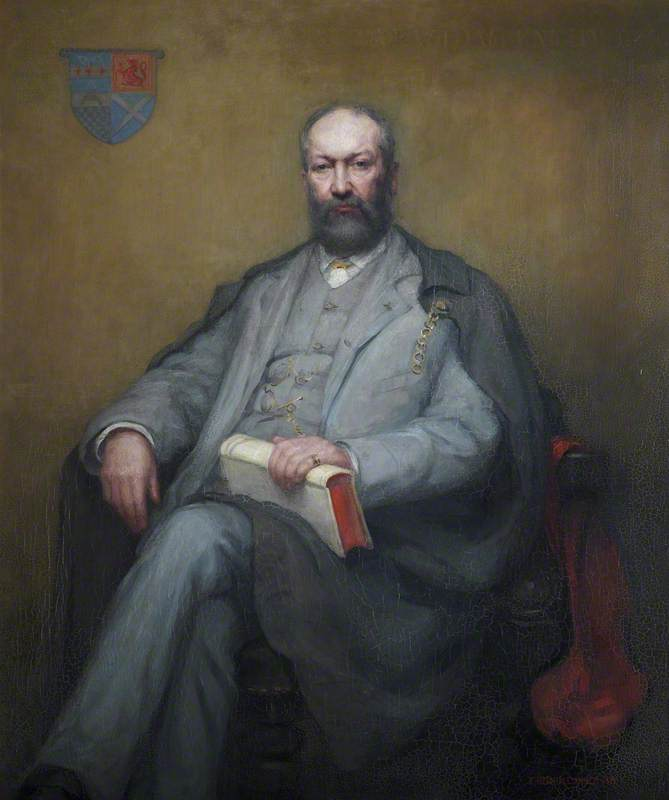
William Angus Knight (1836–1916) L.L.A. "creator"

The creation/ development of the LLA was pushed in large part by William Angus Knight (1836–1916), who was a Professor of Moral Philosophy at St Andrews from 1876-1903, he was a advocate of female education and the main force behind the university's introduction of the LLA diploma. He also worked to make sure that the examinations matched the standard of the male M.A., even going as far as arranging for identical exam papers in certain subjects. His contributions were supported by other reform-minded academics, but of course they also faced resistance from those who were more conservative within society and the university.

Of course, there was significant social and institutional pushback against women's higher education during this period beyond even just the Scotland area. Many members of the clergy and those of the medical profession argued that academic study would damage women's health or distract them from their "natural" roles in the home such as cooking, cleaning, or taking care of children. Even within universities, there was some reluctance to grant full equality, which is why the LLA existed as a separate qualification rather than immediate admission to degree programs, like a trial for what was to come. Those who criticized the LLA labeled it as a "scheme", unnecessary or even "mischievous", which reflected broader anxieties about the ongoing changing gender roles.

There were also academic and practical barriers that women still faced despite the LLA. Although the qualification was accessible, it required a high level of self-discipline, due to many women studying independently without the basic support systems that were available to their male counterparts. Basic access to resources such as libraries, tutors, and formal instruction would have been limited to women during the time, particularly for those studying outside major cities, additionally, the candidates needed to arrange supervision for their examinations, which would have been difficult depending on their location and social connections.

Even after women were admitted to universities in 1892, the LLA continued to be popular particularly among those who could not commit to full-time or residential study. Thousands of women received an LLA before it was then discontinued in the 1930s, by which time you could say it had fulfilled its purpose.

== Notable literate ladies ==
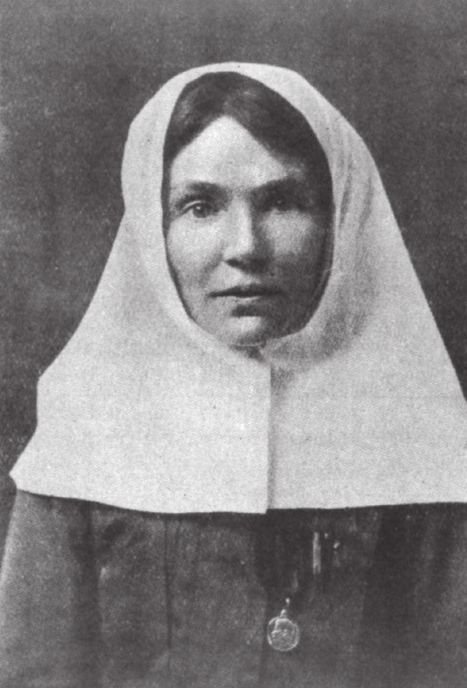
Violetta Thurstan in her Russian Red Cross uniform

The educationalist and headteacher Isabel Cleghorn, Helen Bannerman, the children's writer, Sarah Bannister, educationist and local politician and suffragette Margaret Nevinson all had LLAs, as did the wartime nursing heroine Violetta Thurstan.
