= John Davies (printer and journalist) =

Welsh printer, editor and journalist (1832–1904)

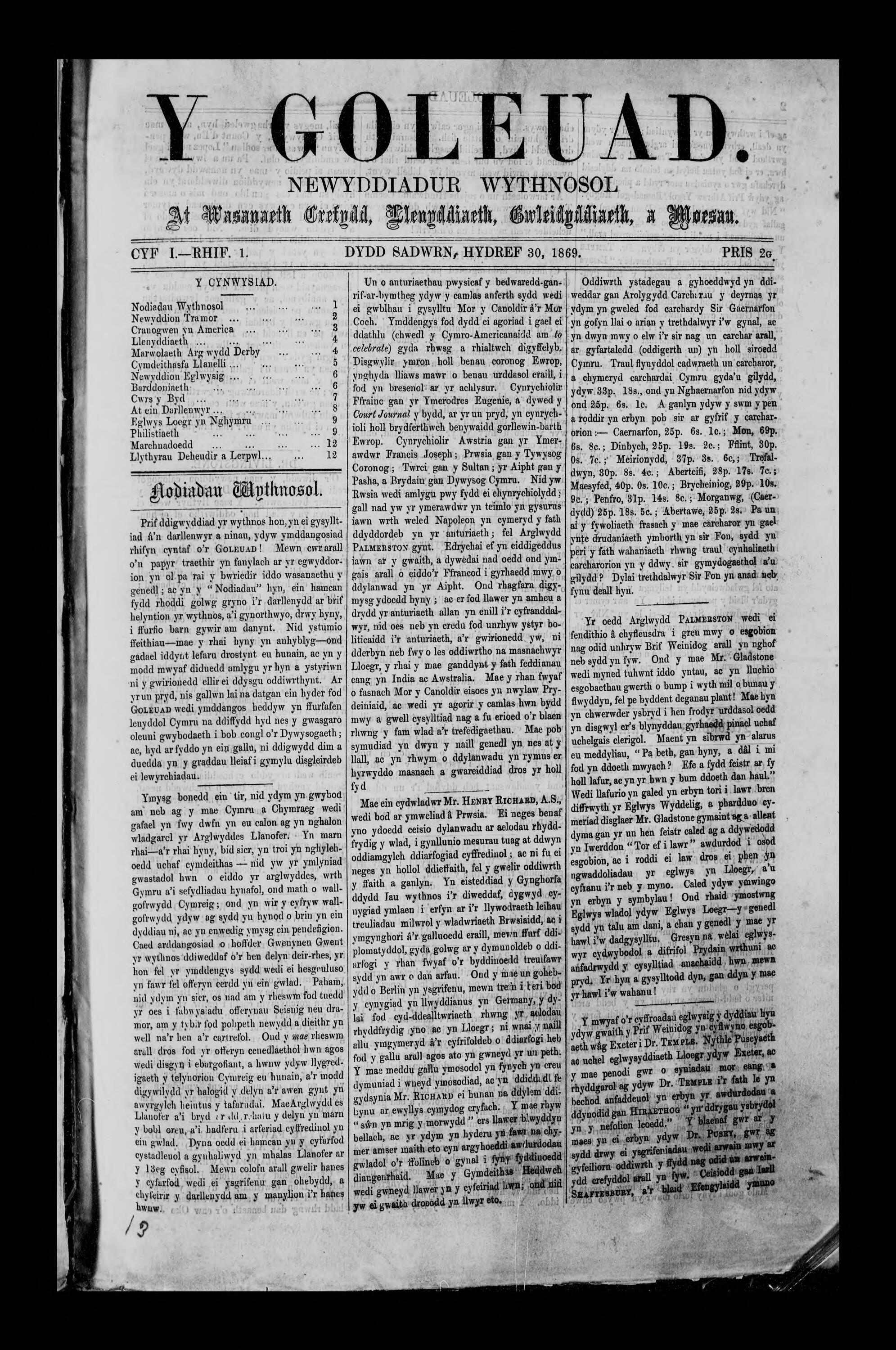
Y Goleuad Oct 30 1869

John Davies (1832–1904), also known as Gwyneddon, was a Welsh printer, editor, journalist and songwriter.

Davies was born in Bangor in North Wales, and as a young man began an apprenticeship as printer in the 'North Wales Chronicle' office. Later he joined the staff team as a reporter.

In 1866 a weekly paper called the 'Cronicl Cymru' began production, and Davies was appointed editor. Two years later, he opened a print shop in Caernarfon. In October 1869, Davies began publishing "Y Goleuad" from his shop.

Several years later, Davies sold his printing business, and became a manager at Pugh and Jones's Bank, in Caernarfon. He was Mayor of Caernarfon for a time.

Davies was the author of ‘Anfeidrol Dduw Rhagluniaeth’, a popular Welsh harvest thanksgiving hymn.

Davies died in Caernarfon on 30 January 1904. He had one son - Alderman Gwyneddon Davies.
