= Alexander Mackennal =

British Nonconformist minister (1835–1904)

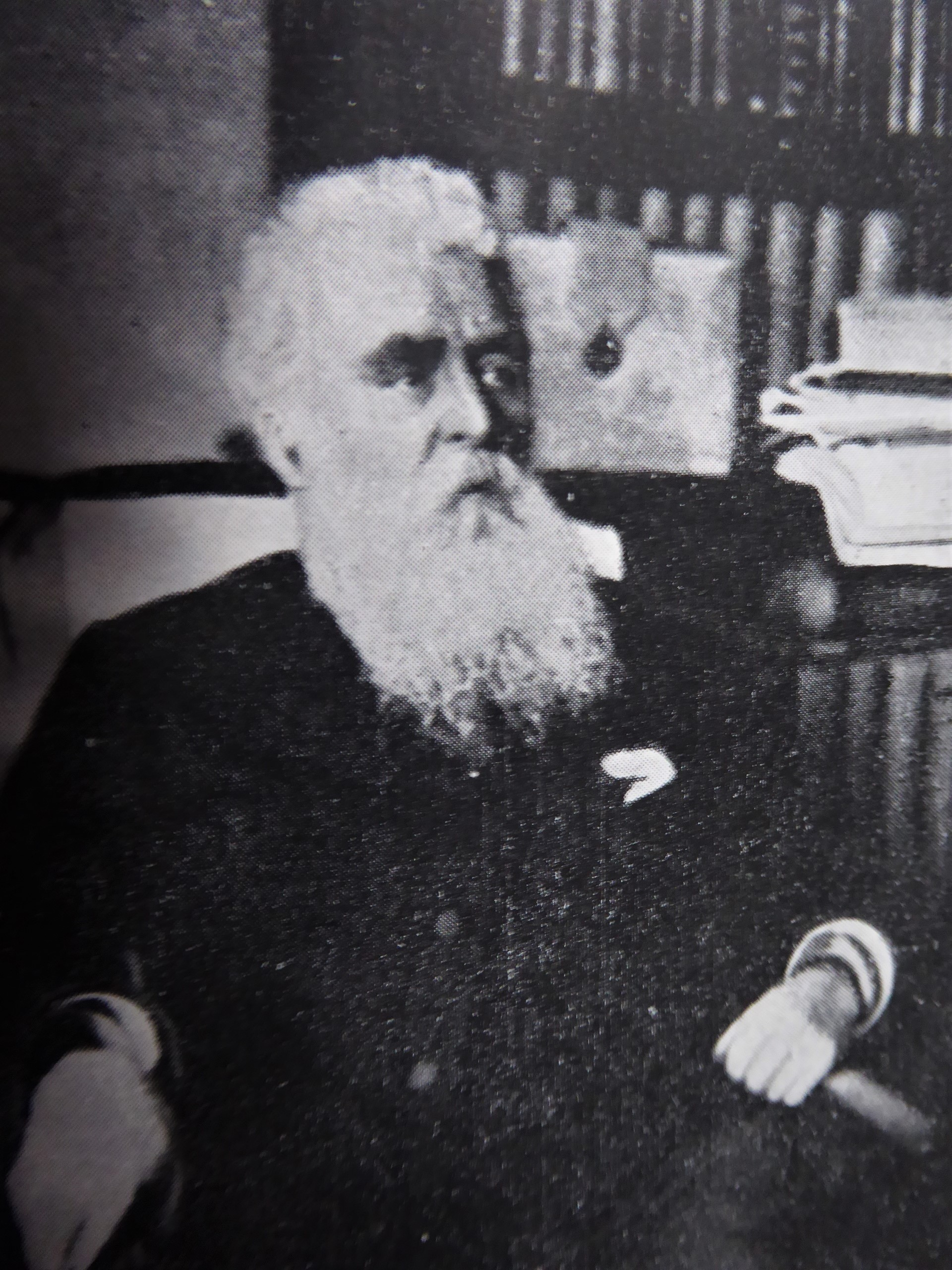
Alexander Mackennal

Alexander Mackennal (14 January 1835 – 23 June 1904) was a British Nonconformist minister.

== Life ==
He was born at Truro in Cornwall, the son of Patrick Mackennal, a Scot, who had settled there. In 1848 the family removed to London, and at sixteen he went to the University of Glasgow. In 1854 he entered Hackney College to prepare for the Congregational ministry, and in 1857 he graduated BA at the University of London. After holding pastorates at Burton upon Trent (1856–1861), Surbiton (1862–1870), Leicester (1870–1876), he finally accepted the pastorate of the Congregational Church at Bowdon, Cheshire, in 1877, in which he remained till his death.

In 1886, he was chairman of the Congregational Union, which he represented in 1889 at the triannual national council of the American Congregational churches. The first international council of Congregationalists held in London in 1891 was partly cause, partly consequence, of his visit, and Mackennal acted as secretary. In 1892 he became definitely associated in the public mind with a movement for free church federation which grew out of a series of meetings held to discuss the question of home reunion.

When the Lambeth articles put forward as a basis of union were discussed, it was evident that all the free churches were agreed in accepting the three articles dealing with the Bible, the Creed and the Sacraments as a basis of discussion, and were also agreed in rejecting the fourth article, which put the historic episcopate on the same level as the other three. Omitting the Anglicans, the representatives of the remaining churches resolved to develop Christian fellowship by united action and worship wherever possible.

Out of this grew the Free Church Federation, which secures a measure of co-operation between the Protestant Evangelical churches throughout England. Mackennal's public action brought him into association with many well-known political and religious leaders. He was a lifelong advocate of international peace, and made a remarkable declaration as to the Christian standard of national action when the Free Church Federation met at Leeds during the South African War in 1900.

Besides a volume of sermons under the title Christ's Healing Touch, Mackennal published The Biblical Scheme of Nature and of Man, The Christian Testimony, the Letters to the Seven Churches of Asia, The Kingdom of the Lord Jesus and The Eternal God and the Human Sonship. These are contributions to exegetical study or to theological and progressive religious thought, and have elements of permanent value.

He also made some useful contributions to religious history. In 1893 he published the Story of the English Separatists, and later the Homes and Haunts of the Pilgrim Fathers; he also wrote the life of Dr JA Macfadyen of Manchester. In 1901 he delivered a series of lectures at Hartford Theological Seminary, Connecticut, USA, published under the title The Evolution of Congregationalism. He died at Highgate on 23 June 1904. See D. Macfadyen, Life and Letters of Alexander Mackennal (1905).
