= St Mary's Church, Haverfordwest =

Church in Haverfordwest, Pembrokeshire, Wales

Coordinates: 51°48′04″N 4°58′19″W

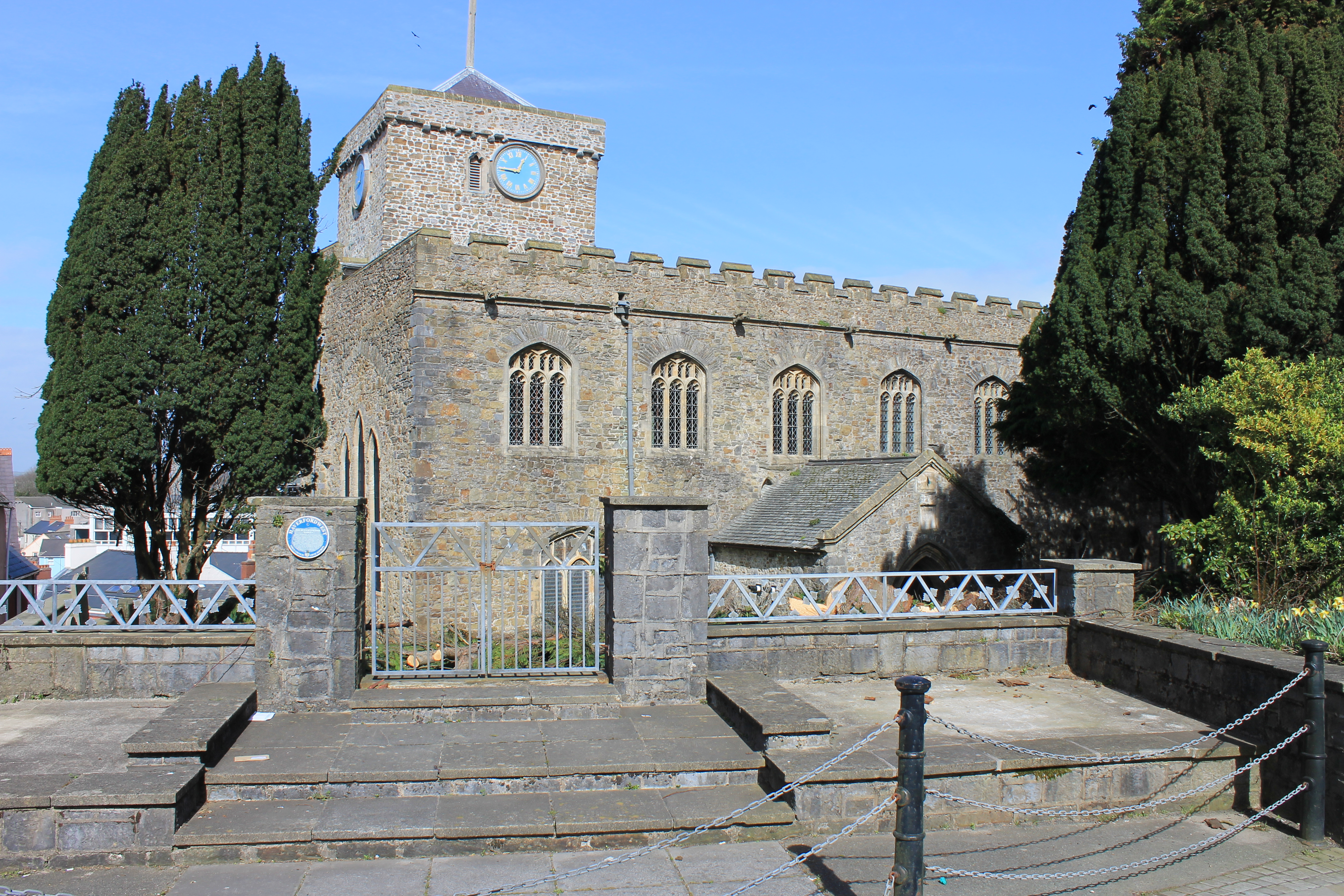
St Mary's Church

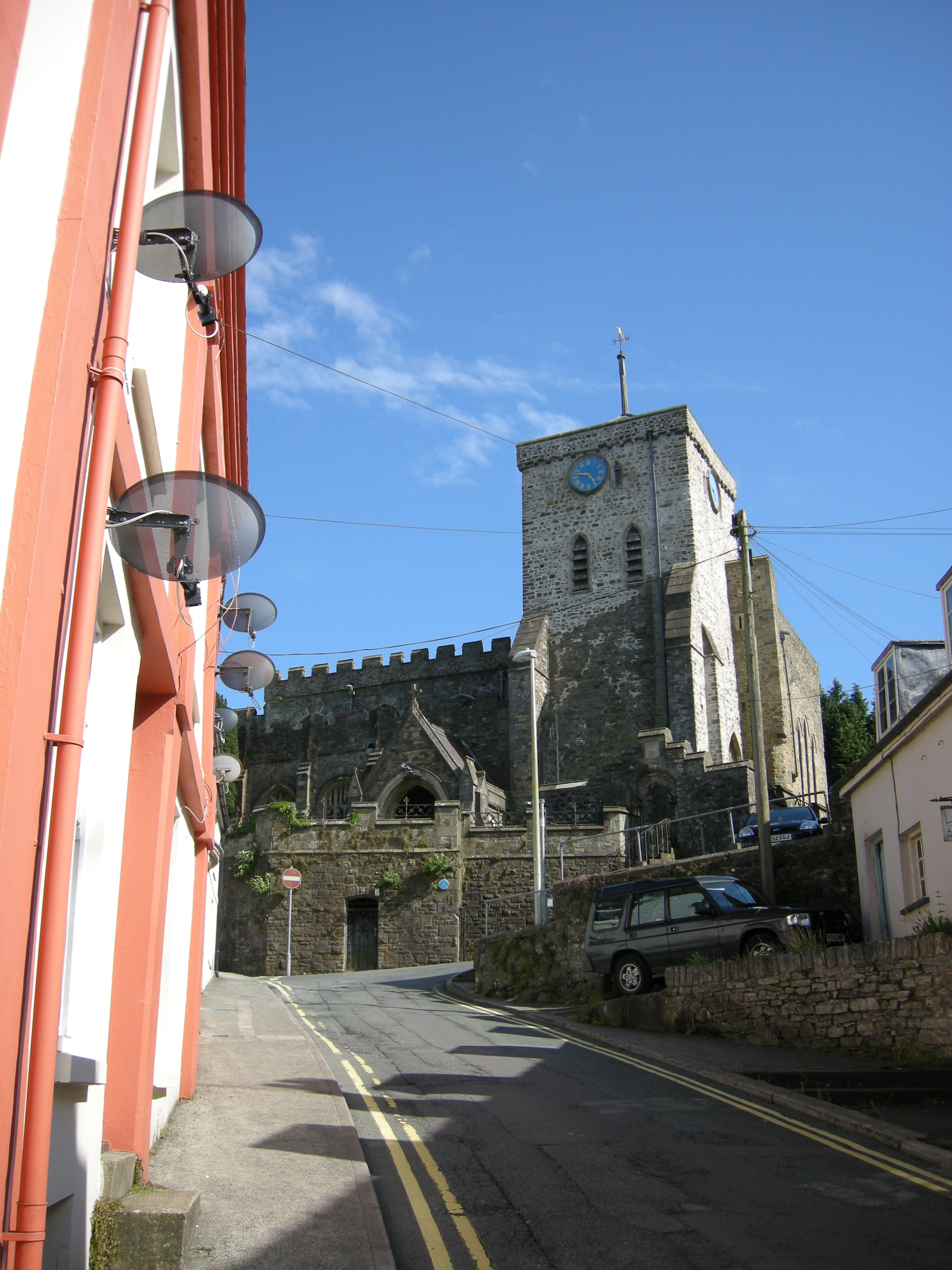
St Mary's at the top of the town

St Mary's Church is an Anglican church in the centre of Haverfordwest, Pembrokeshire, Wales, prominently visible at the top of the town's High Street. The church dates from the 12th century and is a Grade I listed building

== History ==
The main body of the church was built in the late 12th century and was probably rebuilt in the 1240s, including a tower, porches and north aisle, after being damaged by Llewelyn the Great in 1220. An upper level of clerestory windows was added during the 15th century. The tower originally had a timber spire clad in lead, though it was removed in 1802 after becoming dangerous.

The church's interior has a fine timber panelled ceiling with moulded beams, rafters and ribs, and carves bosses at the intersections. It dates to c. 1500.

The church organ dates from 1737, by Harris & Byfield, with two keyboards.

Of the three main churches in the town, St Mary's was originally the church for the merchants. St Martins of Tours was for the castle and the aristocracy while St Thomas á Becket was for the common people. St Mary's joined with St Thomas a Becket in the 1940s under one vicar. When St Thomas closed because of insurmountable repair bills, the congregation met at St Mary's church. St Martins finally merged with the parish in 2013.

St Mary's has been a listed building since 1951, now listed as Grade I as a "major medieval church with exceptionally well-preserved detailing."
