= Carnarvon and Denbigh Herald =

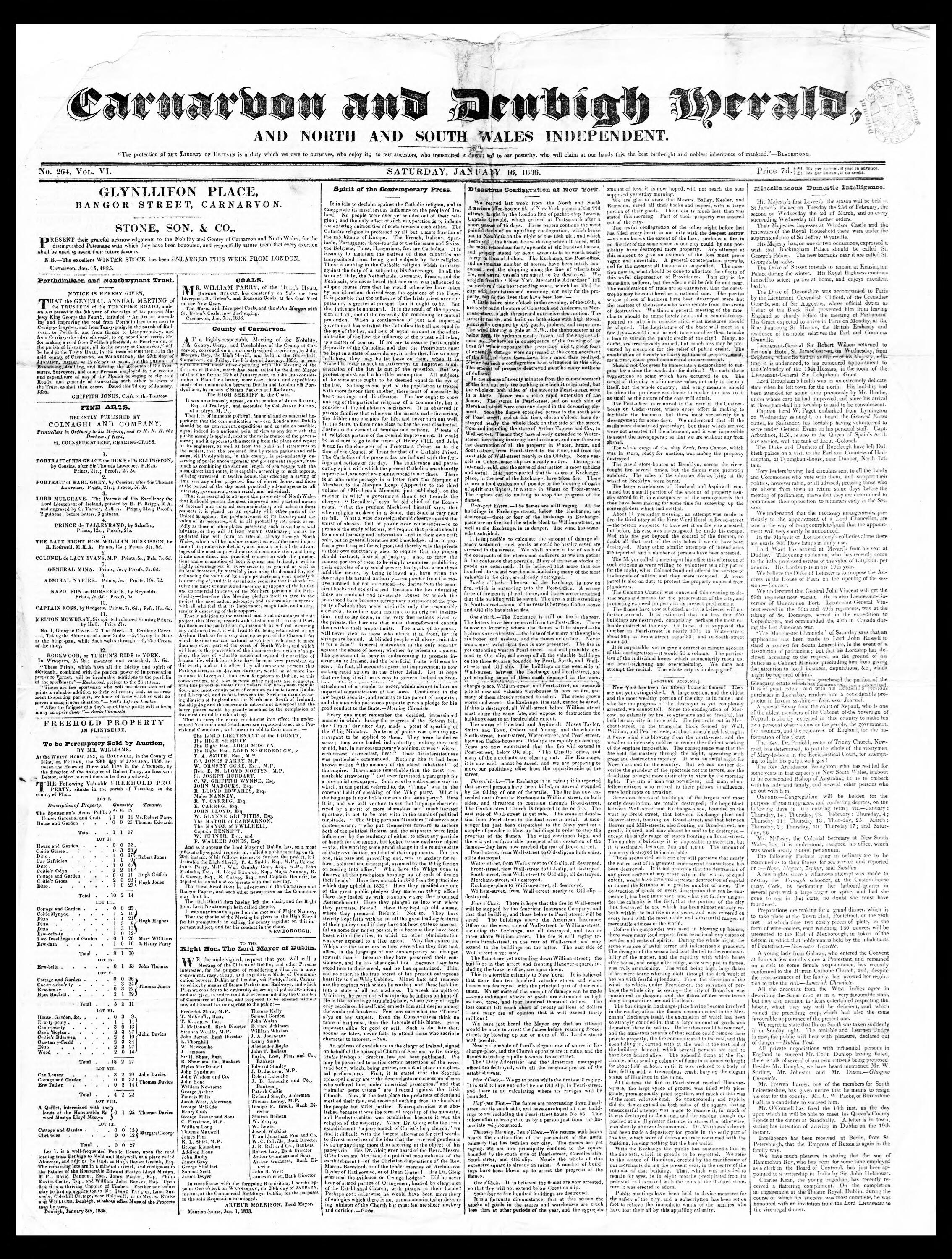
- Carnarvon and Denbigh Herald and North and South Wales Independent
- Type: weekly newspaper
- Publisher: James Rees
- Editor: Owen Picton Davies, Daniel Rees[*]
- Launched: 9 January 1836
- City: Caernarfon
- Country: Wales
- OCLC number: 57965341

Carnarvon and Denbigh Herald was a liberal, English-language newspaper that was published weekly between 1836 and 1920. It was published in Caernarfon and circulated in North Wales and London, Liverpool and Manchester.

The main content of the Carnarvon and Denbigh Herald was local and general news. The inaugural editor of the paper was James Rees. It was first issued on 9 January 1836.

Welsh Newspapers Online has digitised more than 1,500 issues of the Carnarvon and Denbigh Herald (1836–1910) from the newspaper holdings of the National Library of Wales.
