= Y Goleuad =

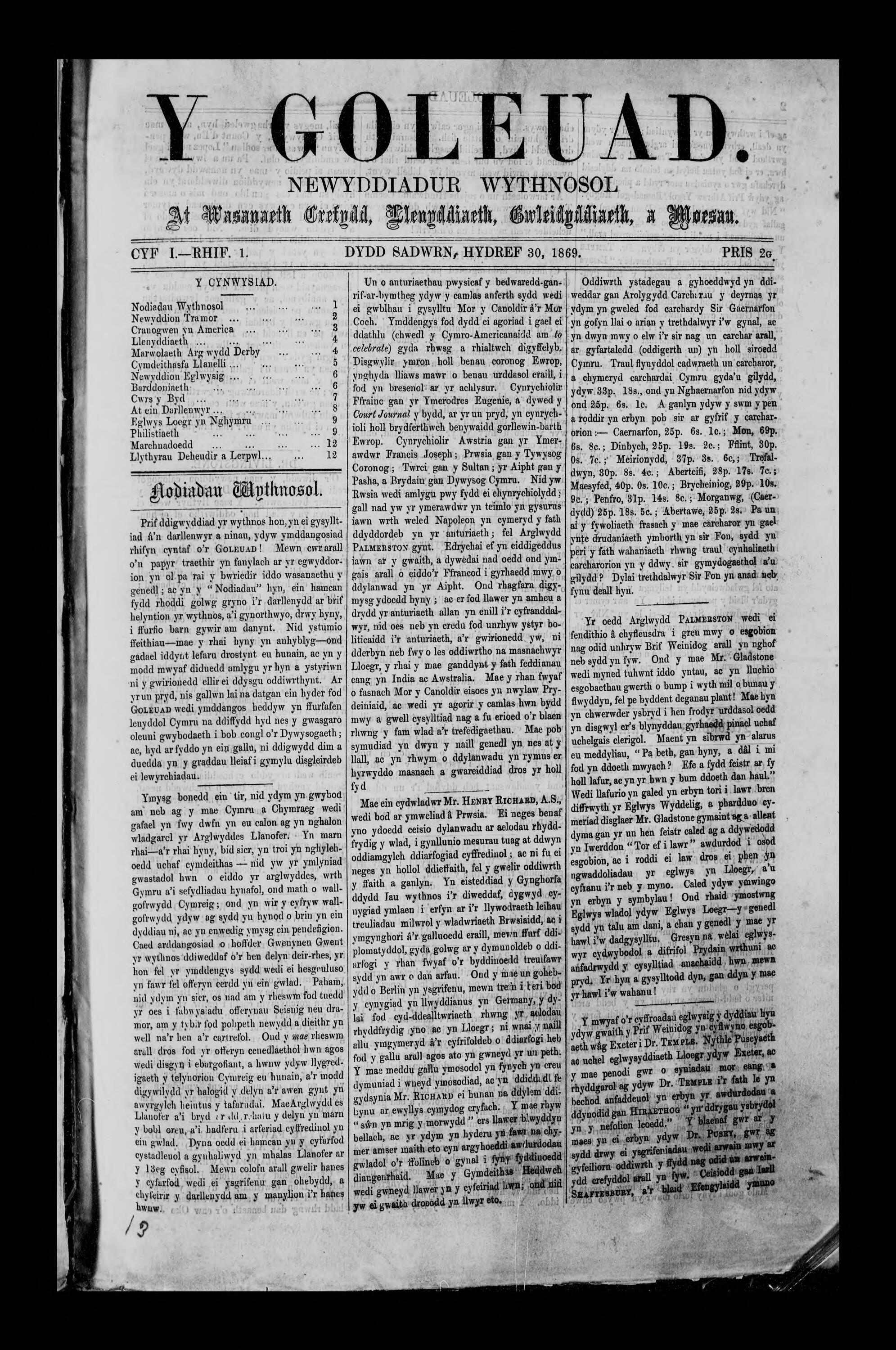
- Type: weekly newspaper, newspaper
- Publisher: John Davies, Evan William Evans
- Editor: John Davies, John Roberts
- City: Dolgellau, Caernarfon, Caernarfon
- Country: United Kingdom

Y Goleuad (established in 1869) was a liberal weekly Welsh language newspaper distributed to Welsh Calvinistic Methodist groups throughout Wales and to the Methodist Welsh speakers of Liverpool, Manchester, Bristol, and London. Its content generally reflected denominational interests.

Welsh Newspapers Online has digitised 2,189 issues of Y Goleuad (1866–1919) from the newspaper holdings of the National Library of Wales.
