= J. Dunn & Co., Tenby =

Welsh bank

J. Dunn & Co., Tenby was a Welsh bank operating in the 19th century, with a branch located at Tenby in Pembrokeshire.

== Establishment ==
This bank was established in Tenby by John Dunn of Westmoor House, Manorbier, a descendant of the Dunns of Crigmarran, Pembrokeshire. John Dunn was sheriff for Pembrokeshire in 1858.

== History ==
The name of the bank appeared in the London Directory list of banks for the years 1815 and 1816.

Crosby's "Complete Pocket Gazetteer of England and Wales", of 1815, refers to the bankers of Tenby as Messrs. Dunn & Co. and that they draw on Messrs. Stephenson & Co., London. Crosby does not refer to any other banks for Tenby.
