= Rhos Baptist Chapel, Mountain Ash =

Coordinates: 51.681728°N 3.378217°W

Rhos, Mountain Ash was a Baptist chapel in Mountain Ash, Glamorgan, Wales. Services at Rhos were conducted in the Welsh language.

== Early history ==
There is evidence of Baptist activity in the locality from the early nineteenth century when a small number of families with Baptist affiliations moved to the area and became members at Calfaria, Aberdare. In 1840 a small chapel named Nazareth was built, with opening services being held on 1 July 1841. The cause appears to have struggled in the 1840s, but in 1849 Thomas Price, the minister of Calfaria, Aberdare, took on the ministry and baptised a number of new members.

By 1853 the chapel was found to be too small and a new buildings erected by Richard Mathias at a cost of £487. Opening services, at which Thomas Price presided, were held in November of that year.

The church was now in a position to call minister of its own, and with Price's blessing, a call was issued to Rev. William Williams of Lisvane who was inducted in April 1855. Williams remained the minister at Rhos until 1891.

Early in Williams's ministry the buildings at Nazareth were once again judged to be too small, in the wake of the 1859 Religious Revival, therefore Rhos was built at a cost of £1800 and opened on 6 and 7 October 1861. Nazareth then became home to an English language congregation. Rhos was the largest chapel in Mountain Ash. It was the mother church of Jerusalem, Penrhiwceiber and Ffrwd, Mountain Ash.

William Williams remained minister until 1891. T.T. Hughes was minister from 1893 until 1906. In 1899 the membership stood at 447.

== Twentieth Century ==
R.S. Rogers was then inducted as minister in 1908. Thomas Edmunds, a member at Rhos, was President of the Welsh Baptist Union in 1913.

Rogers was succeeded by T.J. Hughes (1917-19) and Daniel Jones from 1920 until 1948.

== Later history ==
The annual meetings of the Baptist Union of Wales were held at Rhos in 1947, shortly before the end of Daniel jones's long ministry. R.S. Rogers, Capel Gomer, Swansea, the former minister at Rhos, delivered his presidential address as chair of the Union.

B.J. Jones was minister from 1950 until 1955 and was succeeded by J. Dudley Morgan in 1959.

Rhos was one of the first chapels in the Aberdare Valley to close in 1973. The chapel was demolished in 1975. Prior to demolition, the organ was transferred to Gwawr, Aberaman.

== Bibliography ==
- Jones, Alan Vernon (2004). Chapels of the Cynon Valley. Cynon Valley Historical Society. ISBN 0953107612.
- Parry, R. Ifor (1964). "Crefydd yng Nghwm Aberdar, a Chyfraniad y Bedyddwyr". Undeb Bedyddwyr Cymru, Aberdar (in Welsh): 15–61.
- Undeb Bedyddwyr Cymru, Y Rhos, Aberpennar (in Welsh). 1947.
- Undeb Bedyddwyr Cymru, Aberdâr (in Welsh). 1964.
