= Bethesda Chapel, Abercwmboi =

Chapel in Abercwmboi, Rhondda Cynon Taf, Wales

Coordinates: 51.6891°N 3.4101°W

Bethesda, Abercwmboi
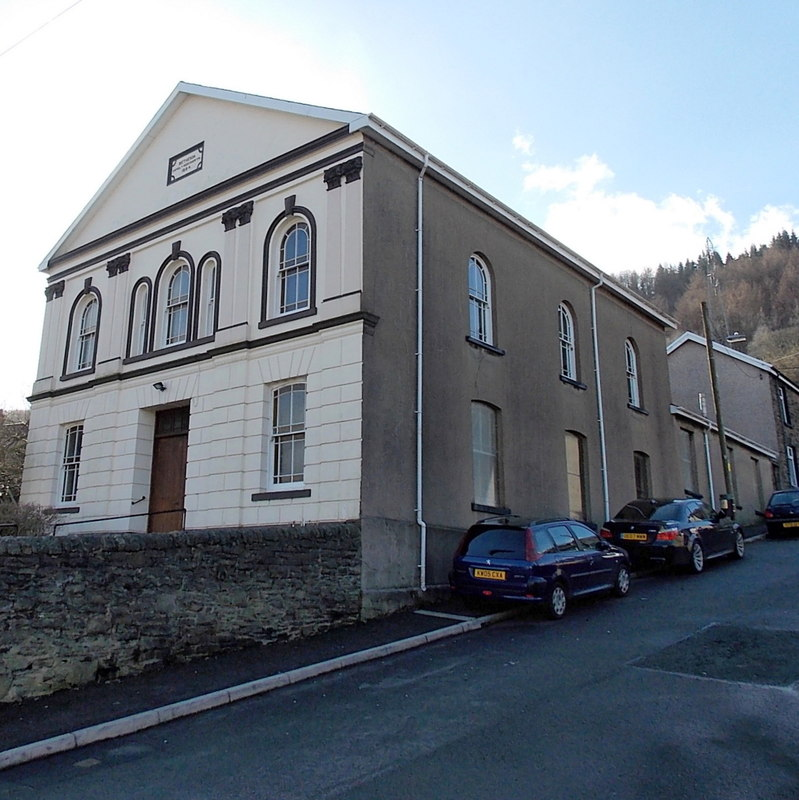
- Bethesda, Abercwmboi
- Country: Wales
- Denomination: Welsh Baptist

History
- Founded: 1854

Architecture
- Architectural type: Chapel
- Style: Classical
- Completed: 1864

Specifications
- Capacity: 600

Bethesda, Abercwmboi is a Welsh Baptist church in Abercwmboi near Aberdare, South Wales. Services continue to be held in the Welsh language.

== Early history ==
The origins of the cause date back to 1854 when a small group of members from Gwawr chapel, Aberaman began to hold prayer meetings in the locality, which was then known as Cap Coch. In 1856 two houses in Jenkin Street were purchased and converted into a chapel: the chapel was opened in September 1856 at services presided over by the Revs. Thomas Price, T. Nicholas and W. Williams.

The church was incorporated on 14 May 1860 and 39 members came there from Gwawr. The first recorded minister, for a brief time that year, was Robert Owen. James Jones was minister from 1862 until 1869. During his ministry, in 1864, a new chapel was built with seating for 600.

After Rees departed in 1869, a number of ministers served at Bethesda for a relatively short time in the early years, namely Jenkin Rees (1870–71), John Thomas (1872-74) and David Davies (1875–78). W. Ceinfryn Thomas then became minister in 1880 and remained for ten years.

== The twentieth century ==
Mathias Jenkins became minister of Bethesda in 1900 and served for thirty years. After four years without a minister, Arthur G. Llewelyn became minister in 1934 and served until 1960. The building was extensively renovated in 1938 and 1950.

== Beyond 2000 ==
In 2019, Bethesda is one of the few remaining Welsh Baptist churches in the locality. The chapel is built in the Classical style, with two storeys, a gable-entry plan and a hall/ Sunday school/ vestry located behind the main building. Bethesda is now Grade II listed for its handsome classical facade, unaltered interior with original furnishings and unusual panelled ceiling.

Some members from Calfaria Chapel, Aberdare joined Bethesda when their own chapel closed due to low membership in recent years.

== Bibliography ==
- Jones, Alan Vernon (2004). Chapels of the Cynon Valley. Cynon Valley Historical Society. ISBN 0953107612.
- Parry, R. Ifor (1964). "Crefydd yng Nghwm Aberdar, a Chyfraniad y Bedyddwyr" [Religion in the Aberdare Valley, and the Baptist Contribution]. Undeb Bedyddwyr Cymru, Aberdar (in Welsh): 15–61.
- Undeb Bedyddwyr Cymru, Y Rhos, Aberpennar (in Welsh). 1947.
- Undeb Bedyddwyr Cymru, Aberdâr (in Welsh). 1964.
