= James Griffiths (minister) =

Welsh Baptist minister (1856–1933)

James Griffiths (1856 – 12 April 1933) who served as minister of the Baptist churches at Calfaria, Llanelli and Calfaria, Aberdare.

== Early life ==
Griffiths was born in Pencoed in 1856, the third of thirteen children. At the age of twelve he was baptized and became a member of the congregation at the Baptist church at Blackmill. In early life, he worked as a weaver before enrolling as a student at Pontypool Baptist College in 1879.

== Ministry at Llanelli ==
In 1883, Griffiths was ordained as minister at Calfaria, Llanelli, where he remained for seven years. During his time at Llanelli, he built a reputation as a minister.

== Ministry at Aberdare ==
In February 1889, Griffiths preached at Calfaria, Aberdare, where there was a vacancy following the death of its long-serving minister, Thomas Price the previous year. Later that year he received a unanimous call to become his successor at Calfaria. He was inducted as minister at special services held on Christmas Day 1889.

In 1898 the Welsh Baptist Union held its annual assembly at Calfaria, and in 1903 a new organ was purchased at a cost of £850.

Griffiths later wrote the church's centenary history in 1912. Membership stood at 537 in 1899 with a slight decline to 420 by 1916 and 396 in 1925.

== Later years ==
In 1923, Griffiths was elected president of the Baptist Union of Wales. He retired from his pastorate in 1930 at the age of 74.

Griffiths died on 12 April 1933 and was buried at Blackmill.

== Sources ==
=== Books and Journals ===
- Davies, G. Henton (July 1968). "A Welsh Man of God" (PDF). Baptist Quarterly. XXII (7): 360–70. doi:10.1080/0005576X.1968.11751256.
- Jones, Alan Vernon (2004). Chapels of the Cynon Valley. Cynon Valley Historical Society. ISBN 0953107612.
