= Richard Fothergill =

Richard Fothergill may refer to:

- Richard Fothergill (politician) (1822–1903), English ironmaster, coalmine owner and politician
- Richard Fothergill (ironmaster) (1758–1821), ironmaster in Wales
