= Bethel Chapel, Abernant =

Bethel, Abernant
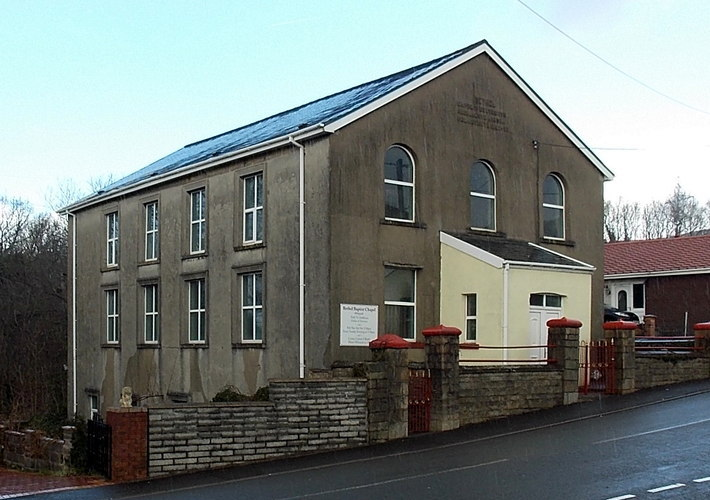
- Bethel Chapel
- Bethel, Abernant
- 51°43′18″N 3°25′47″W
- Denomination: Baptist

History
- Status: Active
- Founded: 1846

Architecture
- Style: Simple Round-headed
- Years built: 1856–1895
- Completed: 1895 (replacing earlier building)
- Construction cost: £344 (1856)

Bethel, Abernant is a Baptist Chapel at Abernant in the Aberdare Valley in Wales and one of the few nonconformist chapels in the area that remained open into the twenty-first century.

== Foundation ==
Bethel was a branch of Calfaria, Aberdare and began as a Sunday School in 1846, overseen by the Rev. John Thomas. The church itself was established in 1857, largely at the instigation of Thomas Price, minister of Calfaria, Aberdare, and the leading figure in the Baptist denomination in the locality.

The original 1856 schoolroom, which cost £344 to build, proved inadequate within a short time. In 1861 it was taken down and the chapel rebuilt and re-opened a year later. On 20 May 1862, members from the mother church at Calfaria and other churches at Aberdare marched in a procession from Aberdare to Abernant, led by Thomas Price, and a foundation stone for the new chapel was laid. Within a mere seven months the building was ready, with opening services being held on 7 and 8 December 1862. 163 members were released from Calfaria to strengthen Bethel. These were amongst 927 men and women released from Calfaria during Price's ministry to establish local chapels.

Price, however, ensured that the unity of the Baptist 'family' of churches was maintained by such activities as Baptismal services in the river Cynon and annual eisteddfodau. In 1913, a local resident recalled:

"I remember that once a month on Sunday afternoons, Dr. Price, the Baptist minister, used to baptise his recent converts in the Cynon River, alongside the iron bridge at the bottom of Commercial Street. I have seen as many as 25 or 30 converts, men and women, on the same afternoon. On these occasions the whole of the Baptist community used to meet at the chapel and march in procession through the streets with the converts, the men converts being attired in long black robes and the women in white. They marched through the streets from the chapel to the place of baptism singing hymns. As a matter of course, large crowds gathered on the river banks to witness the immersions."

Price is recorded as having conducted many baptismal services in the river Cynon, both alongside the iron bridge as described above or in a pool above the original schoolroom which had been provided for the purpose by Richard Fothergill, owner of the ironworks. (Note: Significantly, Price and Fothergill were allies in local politics and Price later supported Fothergill in his successful parliamentary campaign in 1868)

== Early history ==
William Williams became the first minister in 1864 but he remained for only a year or so before moving to Abercarn. He was followed by T.T. Jones who remained for eighteen months, but within that time conducted 159 baptisms. During Jones's brief ministry, Bethel became the focus of educational activity with the minister delivering a series of lectures on Geology. Historian Ifor Parry cites this as an example of the chapels' pivotal role in working class education before the introduction of elementary education for all and the expansion of intermediate education.

In 1867, Bethel became one of the first churches in the Aberdare Valley to install a baptismal well inside the chapel. This presumably brought the era of baptisms in the river Cynon to an end.

John Fuller-Davies was minister from 1869 until 1872. He died from smallpox an around 10,000 people attended his funeral at Aberdare cemetery. The debt of £800 incurred in the building of the chapel was cleared by 1873.

John Mills became minister at Bethel in 1876. He was previously a minister at Treuddyn and Leeswood in Flintshire and was inaugurated at services at Bethel on 23 January. Mills remained until his death in 1909.

By 1880, Bethel had 240 members. A further structural modification occurred in 1895 at a cost of £2000, with seating available for 750 people.

== Twentieth century ==
In December 1862, Bethel held a week-long series of services to celebrate half a century since the opening of the chapel building.

Rev B. Williams was inaugurated as minister of Bethel in January 1914. In 1914, 47 young men from Bethel joined the armed forces. In 1916 membership stood at 395 and remained steady at 398 in 1925. Williams remained minister until 1932. Williams was succeeded by Alun J. Davies (1938–45), Emlyn Jones (1950–56), Glyn E. Williams (1957–59) and Idwal Wynne Owen from 1961.

Membership fell to 154 in 1955 and 137 in 1963. By 2004 only eight members attended services.

== Bibliography ==
- Jones, Alan Vernon (2004). Chapels of the Cynon Valley. Cynon Valley Historical Society. ISBN 0953107612.
- Parry, R. Ifor (1964). "Crefydd yng Nghwm Aberdar, a Chyfraniad y Bedyddwyr". Undeb Bedyddwyr Cymru, Aberdar (in Welsh): 15–61.
- Undeb Bedyddwyr Cymru, Y Rhos, Aberpennar (in Welsh). 1947.
- Undeb Bedyddwyr Cymru, Aberdâr (in Welsh). 1964.
