= Soar Chapel, Llwydcoed =

Former chapel in Llwydcoed, Rhondda Cynon Taf, Wales

Coordinates: 51.732986°N 3.460168°W

Soar, Llwydcoed was a Baptist Chapel in Kingsbury Place, Llwydcoed, Aberdare, Glamorgan, Wales. Services at Soar were held in the Welsh language.

Soar was a branch of Heolyfelin, a neighbouring Baptist chapel. The first services were held in houses in the locality until the first chapel building was erected in 1859 with seating for 380 people. Like many Baptist chapels in the locality, Thomas Price was involved in its formation and preached at the opening services, together with Benjamin Evans of Heolyfelin. Evans served as minister of Soar, as well as Heolyfelin, until his departure to Neath in 1861. His successor, William Harris, was also minister of Soar as well as Heolyfelin until 1876.

Daniel Jones was the first minister from 1876 until 1898. During his ministry a nw vestry was built in 1892 at a cost of £300. He was succeeded by D.G. Price (1900–07) but after his departure, Soar was without a minister for ten years.

Eventually, Vaughan Pugh became minister in 1917, and during a short but successful ministry, several renovations were made including a new vestry. Following his departure there was another period without a minister and Cynog Williams of Heolyfelin took charge of Soar. (1907-20)

In 1938, Christmas Jones became minister of Soar as well as Saron, Godreaman. During this time there were some disagreements within the church and in 1947 it was reported that the membership was small. By then, the first woman deacon, Lizzie Anne Rowlands, had been elected. Christmas Jones served until 1954. D. Meredith Morgan was the last minister. The chapel closed in the early 1980s.

== Bibliography ==
- Jones, Alan Vernon (2004). Chapels of the Cynon Valley. Cynon Valley Historical Society. ISBN 0953107612.
- Parry, R. Ifor (1964). "Crefydd yng Nghwm Aberdar, a Chyfraniad y Bedyddwyr". Undeb Bedyddwyr Cymru, Aberdar (in Welsh): 15–61.
- Undeb Bedyddwyr Cymru, Y Rhos, Aberpennar (in Welsh). 1947.
- Undeb Bedyddwyr Cymru, Aberdâr (in Welsh). 1964.
