= Aberdare strike 1857–1858 =

Industrial dispute in South Wales

One of the first significant industrial disputes in the history of the steam coal trade of South Wales took place in Aberdare in 1857–1858. The origins of the strike lay in the decision of the employers to impose a wage reduction of up to 20%, as a result of the general depression in trade in the aftermath of the Crimean War. During the dispute a trade union appeared amongst the miners of the Aberdare Valley but the men were ultimately forced to return to work on the terms set by the owners.

== Origins of the dispute ==
During the autumn of 1857 it was widely rumoured that the coal owners were intending to impose a substantial reduction in wages. Amongst the miners there was a general recognition that some reduction was inevitable and a delegate meeting agreed to send a delegation to local coal owners to argue for a limited reduction. This conciliatory approach was supported by some influential local middle-class figures, most notably Thomas Price, influential minister of Calfaria, Aberdare and also editor of the Welsh language newspaper, Y Gwron (which was published at Aberdare). However, when the masters refused to negotiate, the miners rejected the conciliatory advice of Price and came out on strike.

== The dispute ==
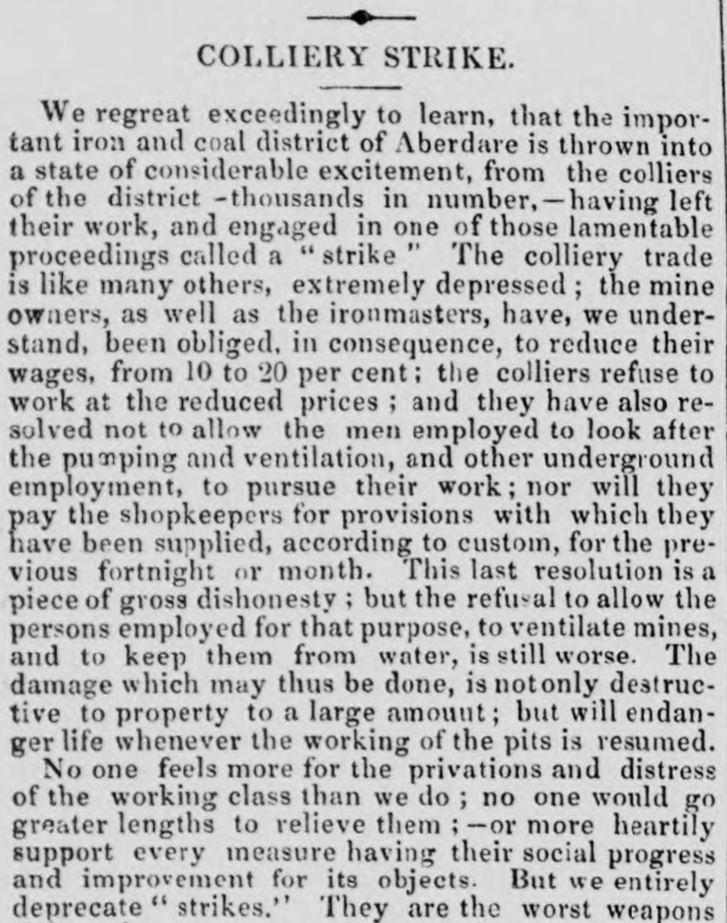
Article Snippet from The North Wales Chronicle and Advertiser for the Principality, Published 12 December 1857

In the early phase of the strike, there were rumours of some violence and intimidation, largely towards those engineers who were maintaining the pits in working order. It appears that the engineers succeeded in doing so at all pits, apart from that at the Shepherds Pit, Cwmaman, where the engineers themselves joined the dispute. In this tense atmosphere, soldiers were sent to Aberdare. Having initially been lodged at the Town Hall, the redcoats were removed to Cardiff when fears of disorder subsided. This appears to have resulted from the intervention of the local Member of Parliament, Henry Austen Bruce. In general, however, the dispute was a peaceful one and was characterised by the emergence of a trade union movement, and the Merthyr Telegraph, in particular, was critical of other newspapers in Cardiff and Swanase which it accused of wildly exaggerating the extent of disorder at Aberdare.

The coal owners of the district, in contrast to the iron masters, saw themselves as Welsh entrepreneurs whose relationship with their workmen were generally good. Men such as David Williams (Alaw Goch) now found themselves in the unfamiliar position of being opposed by their employees. In a letter to the Merthyr Telegraph, Williams rejected the claims made by the miners that there was no reduction in the price of steam coal. He did not blame the men for seeking to sustain their wages but did allude to the threats being made, including flooding the mines.

== Public meetings at Aberdare, December 1857 ==
Henry Austin Bruce, MP for the Merthyr Boroughs, was the employers' main spokesman during the dispute, and addressed meetings at Mountain Ash and Aberdare to present the masters' case to large crowds of workmen. At a public meeting at Aberdare, held in the Market Hall, he callied on the colliers to return to work. In his speech, Bruce recognised that his family had extensive interests in the coal industry but he also claimed that he wished to play a conciliating role in terminating the strike. In the course of a lengthy speech, Bruce argued that the owners were acting reasonably in reducing wages in view of the general economic climate and the condition of both the coal and iron trades in the district.

At this meeting, a very large attendance was reported, and a press report stated that no attempt at interruption occurred at any point. Bruce's speech was translated, for the benefit of those who did not speak Welsh, by the Rev David Price of Siloa, Aberdare. The meeting is significant due to the fact that a number of working men involved with the leadership of the strike spoke, or were invited to speak. These included David Williams, John Jones (Gwalch) and John Davies of Blaengwawr.

While his first speech was relatively conciliatory, Bruce then launched into an attack on the miners' claims and compared their demands with the income that farm labourers in Carmarthenshire and Glamorgan could expect. He referred to the extremism allegedly engendered by trade unionism elsewhere and referred to alleged examples of intimidation and violence in the locality. Significantly, these comments were translated by Thomas Price of Calfaria, Aberdare, who was followed by his fellow minister David Price relating his own experience as a striking miner many years before. The apparent understanding between Bruce and these prominent nonconformist ministers reflects the antipathy of the chapel leadership towards trade unionism. According to one report, Thomas Price proceeded to add some remarks of his own, seeking to induce the men to return to work. His behaviour at this meeting would later be recalled during the 1868 General Election in the constituency, when Bruce was defeated.

It was estimated that, by the time of this meeting, around 6,500 miners were on strike and press reports refer both to the peaceful nature of the dispute and the strangely quiet atmosphere in the normally bustling Aberdare Valley. Furnaces that had remained lit uninterrupted for twenty years were extinguished and, at night, the main source of light was the illumination caused by the ironworks at Merthyr in the neighbouring valley.

On 14 December, two days after the meeting at Aberdare, a mass meeting of miners (some 10,000 according to one press report) was held on Hirwaun Common. In contrast to the meeting at the Market Hall, this demonstration was addressed by miners' leaders only. One of their number, Lewis Morgan, claimed that the miners' were being misled in relation to price of coal at Cardiff and that the proposed reductions in wages were well in excess of what the condition of trade could justify. Other press reports expressed some sympathy with the claims made by the men about advances in wages not having been granted when the price of coal was increasing. There were also significant references to grievances about the introduction of machinery which cut across traditional methods of cutting coal. The Baptist journal, Seren Cymru, emphasised the peaceful nature of this demonstration at Hirwaun in particular.

== End of the dispute ==
By mid-December some of those who had shown sympathy with the men had changed their view.

On 12 January, a meeting was held at Mountain Ash, which strikers from the Monmouthshire valleys were expected to attend. However, it transpired that false rumours had been carried to Monmouthshire intimating that the strike was over at Aberdare. In consequence of the non-appearance of the Monmouthshire delegates, divisions among the men were made apparent. An old collier urged the men to return to work but the majority dissented.

It emerged that some threatening notices had been posted in the valley at this time, reminiscent of earlier industrial disputes in South Wales, most notably the Scotch Cattle in the Monmouthshire Valleys in the 1820s.. The most notable example was a letter allegedly sent by Y Tarw [The Bull] which began: To my faithful Brethren in the strike. I am very thankful to all of you for your valuable services in assisting me in my present troubles. Be faithful for a little while yet, and we will win the day. The letter then proceeded to make vague threats of violence. At a meeting held at the Market Place in Aberdare, John Jones (Gwalch) explicitly denied being the author of this letter

Another meeting was held at Hirwaun Common where it was reported that several of the coal-owners had brought in workers from elsewhere to replace those on strike. Coal trimmers from Cardiff were said to be engaged at mountain Ash while thirty colliers from Pembrokeshire were reported to be at Cwmpennar, although they appeared to have refused to work after realising the circumstances.

Eventually the men were forced to return to work on the employers' terms and the episode had a later significance in the history of the valley and parliamentary constituency.

It has been argued that the religious revival of 1859 which had a considerable impact upon the town was at least partly instigated by the coal owners in their attempts to re-assert their authority.

== Sources ==
=== Books and journals ===
- Jones, Ieuan Gwynedd (1964). "Dr. Thomas Price and the election of 1868 in Merthyr Tydfil: a study in nonconformist politics (Part One)" (PDF). Welsh History Review. 2 (2). University of Wales Press: 147–172. ISSN 0043-2431.
- Turner, Christopher B. (1984). "Religious revivalism and Welsh Industrial Society: Aberdare in 1859" (PDF). Llafur: The Journal of the Society for the Study of Welsh Labour History. 4 (1): 4–13.
