= Rowland Fothergill =

Rowland Fothergill (1794- 19 September 1871) was an ironmaster in South Wales, whose main industrial interests lay in the Aberdare district. He was High Sheriff of Glamorgan in 1850.

He was the son of Richard Fothergill.

Prior to acquiring property in the Aberdare Valley, Fothergill already owned successful works at Tredegar and at Pont-hir near Chepstow. He took over the Abernant Ironworks in 1819 and four years later he took over the management of the Aberdare Iron Company's works at Llwydcoed. He eventually purchased these works outright in 1846.

In due course, Fothergill's industrial interests were inherited by his nephew, Richard Fothergill.

== Sources ==
=== Journals ===
- Jones, Ieuan Gwynedd (1964). "Dr. Thomas Price and the election of 1868 in Merthyr Tydfil : a study in nonconformist politics (Part One)" (PDF). Welsh History Review. 2 (2): 147–172.

=== Online ===
- Price, Watkin William (1959). "Rowland Fothergill". Dictionary of Welsh Biography. National Library of Wales.
