= Lowbridge Estate =

Country estate in Cumbria, England

Coordinates: 54.41°N 2.72°W

The Lowbridge Estate is a country estate of approximately 2000 acres in the Lake District region of England that was in the continuous ownership of the Fothergill family from 1761. Lowbridge House, the principal house on the estate, was built in the 1830s by Richard Fothergill II (1789–1851) in the cottage orné style. The property was substantially updated and improved in 1889 and again in 2017 to 2019. The property has been in the ownership of the Todds since 2017. The property lies between Todd Crag and Bannisdale. Other properties on the Estate include Lowbridge Cottage, Lowbridge Lodge and the Bridge House. The Estate has become a haven for red squirrels with a very active policy of conservation including the extensive planting of red squirrel friendly larch trees and the reintroduction of elusive and rare pine-martens.

== Background ==
The Fothergill family were a family of English ironmasters, founded by Richard Fothergill I (1758–1821), whose business interests were in South Wales.

== The estate ==
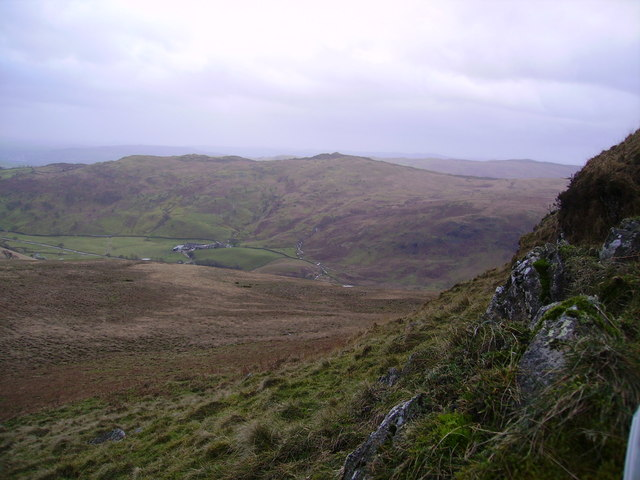
Dry Howe Farm from the slopes of Todd Crag

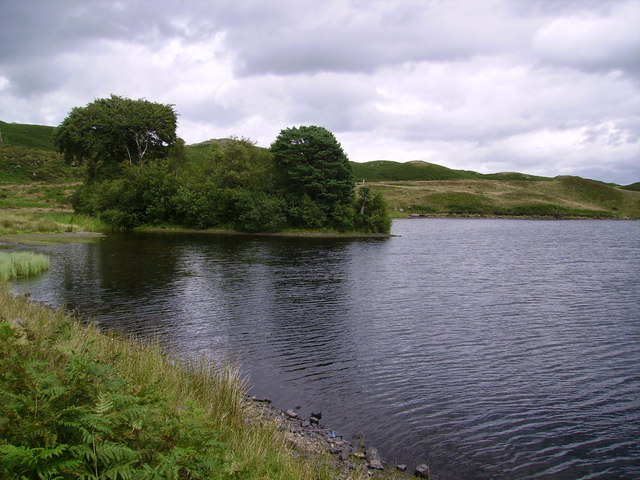
Gurnal Dubbs(lake)

The Lowbridge Estate lies six miles north of Kendal in the Lake District National Park, England, off the A6 road.

Parts of the estate had been owned by the Fothergill family since 1761. The principal house on the estate is Lowbridge House (c. 22,095 sq. ft.) which was rebuilt between 1833 and 1837 by Richard Fothergill II in the then-fashionable Romantic cottage orné style. A lodge house and a new drive were built at the same time as well as a lake and boathouse in front of the house. Beneath the southern terrace are believed to be the remains of a Roman building. Lowbridge Cottage is a former Bastle House, retaining the arrow-slits at first floor level considered essential for defence at the time of the Border Reivers. In the 14th century Bridge House was granted a licence to crenellate (i.e. to be fortified).

In 1845, the estate was expanded through the purchase of the Dry Howe and Bannisdale Head farms and the construction of a road to link them to Lowbridge, thus creating the estate as it exists today. In 1867 the house was extended and in 1884 a "tennis house" and clay court were added.

The largest part of the estate is the Dry Howe Farm of about 1,888 acres which includes the farmhouse and a large part of Bannisdale Fell.

== Sale ==
In 2015, it was announced that the whole estate, including the house, all the grounds and other buildings, was for sale. Also included were a population of red deer, a grouse moor, and shooting rights. The deer are stalked in accordance with the North Lakes Red Deer Group management plan and in 2015, four stags and six hinds were shot.

== See also ==
- Houghton Lodge
- Richard Fothergill III (1822–1903)
