= Ramoth Chapel =

Chapel in Hirwaun, Rhondda Cynon Taf, Wales

Coordinates: 51.7391°N 3.5093°W

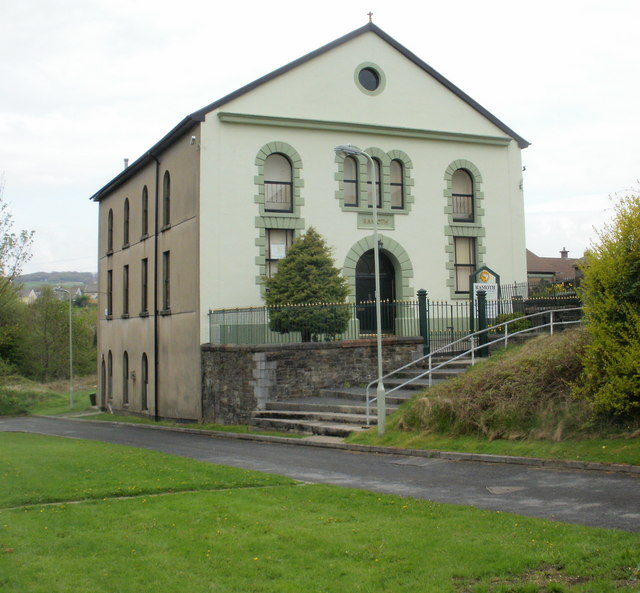
The chapel in 2010

Ramoth, Hirwaun originally a Baptist chapel in Davies Row, Hirwaun, Aberdare, Wales. Services at Ramoth were held in the Welsh language. Following renovation in 1982, the building continues to be used for Christian worship as an Assemblies of God fellowship.

== Foundation and early history ==
The history of Ramoth starts in the early 19th century, when meetings were held in a house owned by George Overton of the Hirwaun Ironworks. However, the early years were difficult and meetings ceased to be held for a time following the closure of the ironworks. The cause revived in 1818. A chapel was opened in 1825 as a branch of Calfaria, Aberdare. There were around 50 members during this period and the opening services were held on 18 June 1826. The chapel was licensed in 1830 and Ramoth accepted to the East Glamorgan Baptist Association at Aberfan in 1831. The first minister between 1832 and 1834 was William Lewis, who was also minister of Calfaria, Aberdare.

In 1840, with membership at 76, it was decided to build a new chapel, which was opened in 1843. While the new chapel was being built, Benjamin Evans, a student from Pontypool College, was ordained as minister of Ramoth. He remained for fifteen years and during this time a branch of Ramoth was opened at Heolyfelin. By 1849, membership had increased to 178.

In 1853, T.W. Rammell's report on public health in the parish of Aberdare stated that the burial ground at Ramoth was nearly full and, due to its proximity to housing, should be among a number of nonconformist burial grounds that should be closed.

Thomas Joseph, a colliery proprietor, was a deacon at Ramoth. In the early 1850s he opened a new colliery at Trecynon and persuaded many Hirwaun colliers who were members at Ramoth to move with him. Joseph was the pivotal figure in the formation of the new church at Heolyfelin, and for a time the membership at Ramoth declined considerably and the cause struggled to remain in existence.

The following ministered at Ramoth in the late nineteenth century: Benjamin Watkins (1857–58), D. Davies (1863–69), E. Colwyn Evans (1872–91) and David Collier (1892-97).

== Twentieth century ==
J.S. Johns arrived as minister in 1899, but died two years later at a young age.

Peak membership was reached in 1904, and in 1913 a new organ was installed following a gift from Andrew Carnegie.

George Hague was minister from 1903 to 1910 and was followed by E. Cefni Jones (1911–20). E.J. Hughes was the longest serving minister from 1923 until 1958.

There is a wax cylinder recording of Rev. E. Roberts made at Ramoth during the Welsh Revival of 1905.

The chapel closed as a Baptist cause in 1982, but was renovated and re-opened as a place of Christian worship in the 1990s.

Ramoth Christian Centre celebrated 150 years at its present location in 2018, and the current building is in its third incarnation.

== Sources ==
=== Books and Journals ===
- Jones, Alan Vernon (2004). Chapels of the Cynon Valley. Cynon Valley Historical Society. ISBN 0953107612.
- Parry, R. Ifor (1964). "Crefydd yng Nghwm Aberdar, a Chyfraniad y Bedyddwyr". Undeb Bedyddwyr Cymru, Aberdar (in Welsh): 15–61.
- Turner, Christopher B. (1984). "Religious revivalism and Welsh Industrial Society: Aberdare in 1859" (PDF). Llafur: The Journal of the Society for the Study of Welsh Labour History. 4 (1): 4–13.
- Undeb Bedyddwyr Cymru, Y Rhos, Aberpennar (in Welsh). 1947.
- Undeb Bedyddwyr Cymru, Aberdâr (in Welsh). 1964.

=== Online ===
- Rammell, Thomas Webster (1853). "Report to the General Board of Health on a preliminary inquiry into the sewerage, drainage, and supply of water, and the sanitary condition of the inhabitants of the inhabitants of the parish of Aberdare in the county of Glamorgan". Internet Archive. General Board of Health.
