= Bill Lanyon =

English footballer

Personal information
- Full name: William James Lanyon
- Date of birth: 18 February 1906
- Place of birth: Abercwmboi, Rhondda Cynon Taf, Wales
- Date of death: 1962 (aged 55–56)
- Position: Outside right

Senior career*
Years	Team	Apps	(Gls)
1926–1927	Aberdare Athletic	7	(0)
1927	Aberaman Athletic		
1928–1929	Portsmouth	0	(0)
1929–1931	Walsall	21	(3)
1931–1932	Peterborough & Fletton United		
1932–1933	Wrexham	2	(0)
- * Club domestic league appearances and goals

William James Lanyon (18 February 1906 – 1962) was a Welsh professional footballer who played as an outside-right. He played in the English Football League for Aberdare Athletic, Walsall and Wrexham.
