= Brecon Ironworks =

Ironworks near Brecon, Wales

Brecon Ironworks was situated one mile north of Brecon, Mid Wales, on the River Honddu. It comprised a charcoal-fired furnace and a forge. Its proprietors, Benjamin Tanner, a local ironmonger, and Richard Wellington, the owner of nearby Hay Castle, erected it in 1720. In 1753 the ironworks was sold to John Maybery, an ironmaster from Pipton, Brecknockshire. The ironworks failed because of the competition from the much more efficient coke-fired furnaces which sprang up in the South Wales Valleys. However, it was closely linked to the accumulation of an extremely large archive which became available to future Welsh historians. Arthur Maybery, a son of John Maybery, became a partner in a long-established firm of Brecon solicitors which, over the years, had drawn up the leases for the ironmasters and their landlords. With the eventual retirement or death of all the members of the firm, the tens of thousands of accumulated papers became the property of Maybery. They remained undisturbed for forty years. Then, Maybery granted Welsh historian John Edward Lloyd access to them, who documented extracts from them to write his illustrated 1906 book The early history of the old South Wales ironworks, 1760 to 1840. After Lloyd had written his book, he donated the papers to the National Library of Wales in Aberystwyth, where they are held as the Maybery Papers.

== The origin of the Ironworks ==
In 1720-1723, Benjamin Tanner, a local ironmonger, and Richard Wellington, the owner of Hay Castle, founded three works, a furnace and a forge one mile north of Brecon on the east bank of the River Honddu, and a forge at Pipton near Glasbury on the Afon Llynfi. Local historian Edwin Poole (1886) described the location of the forge as 'the Priory Groves'. Lloyd (1904) included a photograph of the Brecon furace near the river on an unpaginated page between pages 64 and 65. Owen (1911) discussed in Chapter LVI, 'The old ironworks of Breconshire', the Brecon furnace, which he illustrated with a photograph of 'Forge Lane, near Brecon'.

The lease for the forge at Pipton was granted in 1722 by Henry Williams of nearby Gwernyfed and Charles Williams of nearby Trevithel, each of whom was the riparian owner of each of the sides of the Afon Llynfi, and who were 'interested in the water rights of the Llynfi river.' The lease for the ironworks at Brecon was granted in 1723 by Edward Jeffreys, a barrister of the Inner Temple, who lived nearby in The Priory. Lloyd (1906) observed:

'both works were so placed - the Furnace on the Honddu and the Forge (Pipton) on the Llynfi stream - in order to utilise the water-power in driving the large bellows necessary to produce a strong blast of air, without the aid of which a sufficiently intense heat could not be produced to melt the iron ore, or pig-iron, as the case may be. The Honddu is a brook of fair size, equal to driving two pairs of millstones; the Llynfi, which issues from Llangorse lake, has a trifle less - though more equal - volume of water through the year.'

Local historian Ursula Jepson (1997) observed that, when the Brecon Ironworks and the works at Pipton first started, they 'produced some thirty per cent of the total output of South Wales.'

Lloyd (1906) observed about the Brecon Furnace: 'An old corn-mill had previously stood there, and the site of it, with mill-pond, and leat were ready to hand for conversion to their purposes by the new lessees.' Owen (1911) supported the observation of Lloyd (1906). He observed: 'The Brecon furnace, also called the Honddu furnace, is situated on that river, about a mile from the town, and was erected on the site of an old corn-mill. Jepson (1997) differed about the previous occupant of the site. She observed that the ironworks was situated on the site of a former fulling or tucking mill which used water-powered hammers to process locally woven cloth which was produced by local farmers. The water was obtained from the nearby River Honddu three fields away, which reached the mill down a leat, an artificial channel, to fill a pond at the bottom. Periodic openings of a sluice gate at the lower end of the pond would have been enough to power a water wheel, which in turn would have powered the fulling hammers.

Lloyd (1906) observed that iron ore and limestone for the furnace 'were conveyed in sacks on the backs of horses and mules from the open patch workings at Hirwain [sic], eighteen miles distant, and elsewhere'. (Note: The shortest route from Hirwaun to Brecon would have been over the mountain track of the Bannau Brycheiniog and down into the town.) The furnace was charcoal-fired. Initially the charcoal was produced from its adjacent woodlands. However, insatiable supplies of wood were needed to produce charcoal. (Note: Morley (2010) observed that 'extremely large quantities of wood were needed to produce ... charcoal.' (Morley 2010).) Consequently, wood was later obtained from the surrounding area, including Llangammarch and Llanwrtyd. (Note: Swedish economist Johan Lundstrom (1969) observed: 'the longest distance over which wood was transported to the Brecon furnace was ten miles, the average about five, while the range was two and one-half to ten.' (Lundström 1969, p. 10).)

Lloyd (1906) continued:

'It would almost seem that a forge was added at a later period to the Brecon furnace, but of that no trace exists to-day. Pipton was, however, a forge and nothing more, and it may be assumed was fed by a supply of pig-iron from the Honddu furnace; until a time came when the Honddu furnace fell into disuse, and the pig-iron for the use of all their forges was brought from the Hirwain furnace.'

== The changes of ownership ==
In 1750, Tanner and Wellington assigned their interests in the ironworks to Thomas Daniel and Richard Reynolds, two iron merchants and dealers from Bristol. Then, in 1753, a lease for the land was granted to Thomas Maybery, ironmaster from Powicks (present-day Powick) Forge, on the River Teme in Worcestershire (Note: Collins (2014) stated that Maybery owned Powick Forge. (Collins (2014).), whose family Lloyd (1909) described as being 'born ironmasters'. Maybery did not take out the lease for himself but for his son, John, from Aberlonvey (present-day Three Cocks or Aberllynfi), who owned a forge there, to whom he immediately assigned his interests.

Minchinton (1961) documented (citing Davies 1933, p. 258) that in 1756 John Maybery had a charcoal furnace at Pontprenllwyd, possibly current-day Pontbren Llyd, the activities of which 'were transferred to Brecon in 1757', and that, in the same year, he secured 'the mineral rights of some land at Hirwaun.' Lloyd (1906) described Hirwaun as being 'on the fringe of the great South Wales mineral basin ... in and under which lay an abundance of minerals, and of which Lord Windsor was the Lord of the Manor.' He continued:

'There had been some patch-working here previously for mine for supplying the Brecon Furnace; but it was now resolved by John Maybery, having ascertained the capabilities of the district, both as regards iron ore, coal, and limestone, to lease from Lord Windsor the minerals, and to erect a furnace on some adjacent land in the Parish of Penderin (Note: 'Penderin' is very likely the former name of Penderyn.), which he had been able to secure the freehold of.' (Note: Maybery signed a lease with Lord Windsor in 1787.(Lloyd 1906, p. 12).)

Owen (1911) observed: 'In 1760 hundreds of tons [from the ironworks at Pipton and Honddu] were supplied to H.M. Army and Navy'. Also in 1760, upon the death of Lord Windsor, Maybery took out with John Wilkins, his brother-in-law, a fresh lease and they ran the ironworks in Brecon and Hirwaun, and the forge at Pipton. (Note: Ince (1993) observed that the furnace at Hirwaun 'is thought to be the first coke furnace to operate in South Wales.' (Ince 1993, p. 29).) However Lloyd (1906) documented:

'after the partnership in the Hirwain Iron-works between John Maybery and John Wilkins commenced in 1760, the Brecon Furnace and Forge and the Pipton Forge were worked by them as part of the common partnership. Also, that being able to procure pig-iron from their iron furnace at Hirwain, the Brecon Furnace fell into disuse.'

Lloyd (1906) then opined:

'it is probable that when the firm fell into difficulties in 1777, and the sons of John Wilkins, Walter and Jeffreys, who founded with others "Wilkins' Old Bank at Brecon" in 1778, took over the liabilities, the works at Brecon and Pipton gradually fell into disuse, and were finally abandoned several years before 1800, but as to the exact date of the closing of these works, our papers are silent.'

Minchinton (1961) made observations about the works at Pipton that differ from the opinions of Lloyd (1906). He observed that the forge survived a little longer than the Brecon furnace, obtaining its pig iron from Hirwaun, and that it 'ceased production at an unknown date in the late eighteenth century.'

== The origin of the Maybery Papers ==
John Maybery died in 1784. He left two sons, Thomas and Arthur Henry Augustus, both of whom entered the legal profession. Thomas, his eldest son, succeeded William Wilkins, as Prothonotary for the Brecknock Circuit. And Arthur Henry Augustus, his second son, became the head of Maybery, Williams, and Cobb, the Brecon firm of solicitors (Note: The firm of Maybery, Williams, and Cobb succeeded that of Powell, Jones, and Powell, which in turn had succeeded that of Walter and John Powell.) Lloyd (1906) observed that the firm:

‘had the privilege of being largely employed and trusted by the chief Ironmasters, with the result that in the course of years a mass of documents relating to the South Wales Iron Works accumulated in their offices, and passed on to successive members of the firm … Eventually in 1860, every member of the firm having retired or died, the contents of the office became the property of Mr A. Maybery by descent …’. (Note: Jones 1909, p. 121 documented: 'When the late Mr. H. O. A. Maybery ceased to practice as a solicitor (1905), a large number of very valuable documents relating to property in the County, and to the Iron and Coal Works of South Wales, were discovered by Mr. Lloyd, who, jointly with Sir W. T. Lewis, Bart., went to the expense of having them tabulated and copied. Some of those documents have been published in book form under the editorship of Mr. John Lloyd.')

The 'Maybery Papers' were produced in Brecon and were held in private storage there for forty years. Then, around the end of the nineteenth century or the beginning of the twentieth century, Arthur Maybery granted John Edward Lloyd, historian, access to them. Lloyd recounted that he had come into the possession of a collection of ‘tens of thousands’ of documents about the South Wales iron works.

Lloyd reported that the condition of the papers ‘was such as to make it a risk to health to make among them even a search of a few hours’ duration.’ Nevertheless he examined and reduced them ‘to some kind of order’. Eventually he reproduced what he considered were the most important papers in his The early history of the old South Wales iron works (1760–1840).

Lloyd's book documents the legal histories of most, if not all, the ironworks in South Wales. It comprises thirty-one chapters, which are divided into two divisions, a Western division and an Eastern division.

The locations in the Western division comprise Brecon Furnace and Forge and Aberlonvey Forge; Hirwain Iron Works; Dowlais Ironworks; Cyfarthfa Ironworks; Plymouth Iron Works; Pendyarran Iron Works; Neath Abbey Works; Afon, Ynis y Penalwch, Ynis y Gerwn and Dylais Forges; Ynis y Cedwyn Furnace; Melin Griffith Iron Works; Treforest Works; Aberaman Iron Works; Aberdare Iron Works; Abernant Iron Works and Gadlys Iron Works.

The locations in the Eastern division comprise Bute Ironworks; Union Iron Works; Tredegar Iron Works; Sirhowy Ironworks; Ebbw Vale Iron Works; Abercarne Iron Works; Blaen Afon Iron Works; Nant y Glo Iron Works; Beaufort Iron Works; Clydach Iron Works; Llanelly (or Clydach) Forge; Llangrwyney Forge; The Forge or Trostre Forge; Abbey Tintern Iron Works; Monmouth Forge and New Wear Forge (Note: The 'New Wear Forge' was located on the Monmouthshire bank of the River Wye, at the boundary across the river between Herefordshire and Monmouthshire, below Symonds Yat and opposite, on the other bank, The Doward. The only map in which 'New Wear' appears is in Black & Black 1856, p. 384.)

=== Dates of the granting of leases for South Wales ironworks from 1720 to 1839 (from Lloyd, 1906) ===
Davies (1965) documented the growth of the ironworks from 1801 by citing three cases of the increases in population which occurred:

- the population of Monmouthshire grew from 45,568 to 157,418 in 1851
- the population of Merthyr Tydfil increased from 7,705 to 46,378 fifty years later
- the population of Aberdare increased from 1,486 to 14,999 fifty years later.

Davies observed that 'The new Welsh society sprang up within two generations’.
