= David Bevan Jones =

British minister (1807–1863)

David Bevan Jones (1807 – 18 June 1863), also known by his bardic name Dewi Elfed, was a Welsh Baptist minister who became a leading figure in the Latter Day Saint movement and eventually emigrated to the United States of America.

He was born in 1807 in Gellifaharen, Llandysul, Cardiganshire, the son of John and Hannah Jones. He became a Baptist minister at Seion, Cwrtnewydd (1841–46), Jerusalem, Rhymney (1846–48) and Gwawr, Aberaman from around the beginning of 1849. Soon after his arrival at Aberaman, he became embroiled in a conflict with Thomas Price of Calfaria, Aberdare, who had been instrumental in establishing the new cause at Aberaman. He was accused of being a follower of the Latter Day Saints and the congregation at Gwawr were expelled from the Glamorgan Baptist Association.

In 1851 he approached William Phillips, leader of the Saints in Wales, and together with four others was baptised in the River Cynon on 27 April 1851, with a crowd of 2,000 in attendance. Gwawr became a LDS Church but the Baptists took legal action to recover the building, In November 1851, Thomas Price led a march to recover the building. On their arrival at Gwawr, it became apparent that Dewi Elfed had locked himself inside the chapel, along with one of his supporters. A court official stated that he did not have the authority to gain entry by forcing the door. Price then entered the building along with a deacon and there followed'a wild and exciting chase around the chapel galleries'. Eventually, Dewi Elfed was caught, and thrown out of the chapel by Price.

During the 1850s, Dewi Elfed was an active leader of the LDS Church in Wales and spent time in Llanelli and Swansea. In 1855, however, he was accused of fraud and lost his official posts within the movement.

In May 1860, he emigrated with his wife and two children to the United States but died of tuberculosis in Salt Lake City on 18 June 1863.
