= Calfaria Baptist Chapel, Llanelli =

Former chapel in Llanelli, Carmarthenshire, Wales

Coordinates: 51.6793°N 4.1550°W

Calfaria Baptist Chapel
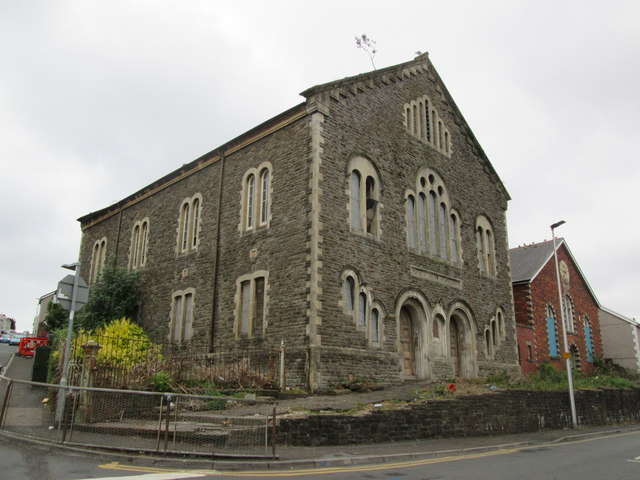
- Calfaria Baptist Chapel
- Location: Bigyn Road, Llanelli
- Country: Wales
- Denomination: Baptist

History
- Founded: 1887–1888

Architecture
- Heritage designation: Grade II
- Designated: 3 December 1992
- Architectural type: Chapel
- Style: Romanesque Revival

Calfaria was one of the many Baptist chapels in Llanelli, Carmarthenshire, Wales.

== History ==
Established in 1881, the original chapel was a modest red-brick building which cost £500 and was opened in January 1882. The first minister was James Griffiths, who moved to Calfaria, Aberdare, in 1890.

In 1887–1888 a new chapel was built in the Lombardic or Romanesque Revival style to a design by George Morgan of Carmarthen, and the old chapel became the Sunday school.

Calfaria was much affected by the 1904–1905 Welsh revival, during which a large number of prayer meetings were held. However, a prominent member was so overcome by the emotional impact of the revival that he was removed to Carmarthen Asylum.

The chapel flourished for over a century before closing in the early twenty-first century. The building is now derelict.

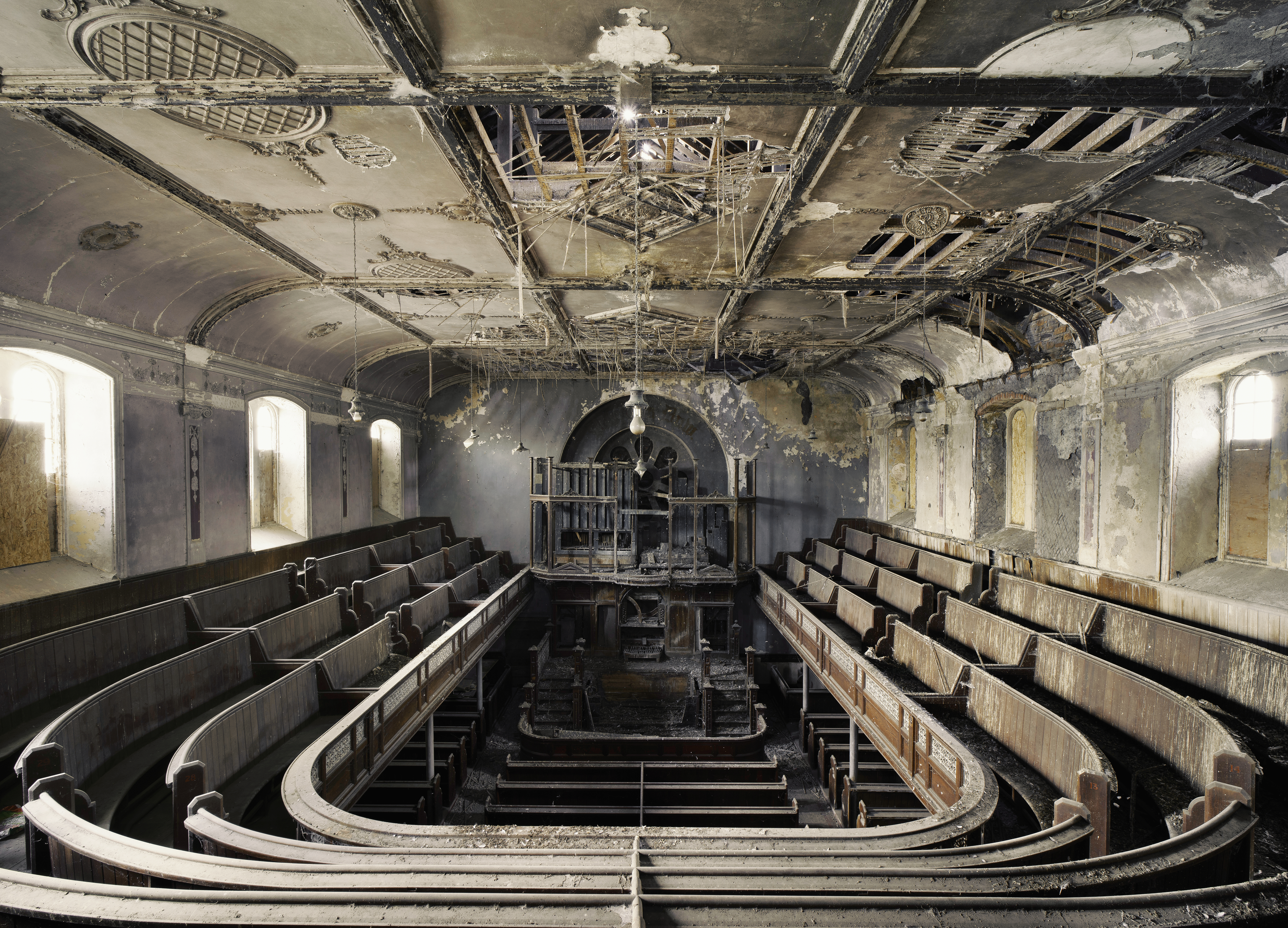
The interior of the chapel in 2020
