= Thomas Fothergill (ironmaster) =

British ironmaster

Thomas Fothergill (1791–1858) was an ironmaster at the Pont-hir iron-works and sheriff of Monmouthshire in 1829.

He was the son of Richard Fothergill.
