= Thomas Price (Baptist minister) =

Welsh clergyman and politician (1820–1888)

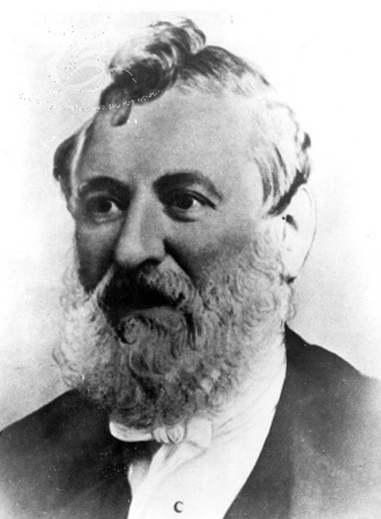
- Thomas Price, minister of Calfaria Baptist Chapel, Aberdare
- Born: Thomas Price; 17 April 1820; Maesycwper, Brecknockshire, Wales
- Died: 29 February 1888 (aged 67); Aberdare
- Resting place: Calfaria
- Occupations: Baptist Minister, writer, editor
- Writing career
- Language: Welsh, English

Thomas Price (17 April 1820 – 29 February 1888) was a leading figure in the political and religious life of Victorian Wales, and the central figure of the Cynon Valley for more than forty years.

As minister of Calfaria Baptist Chapel, Aberdare, Price would establish a number of chapels in the town, wrote and edited a number of books and newspapers, played an active role in local and national government and is remembered as the leading defender of the Welsh speaking population during the "Treachery of the Blue Books" (Welsh: Brad y Llyfrau Gleision)

== Early life ==
Thomas Price was born on 17 April 1820, one of six children born to John and Mary Price of Maesycwper, near Ysgethrog, in the Parish of Llenhamlwch, about three miles below the town of Brecon. He began to earn his living at an early age by assisting a local farmer.

In early life, he became a page boy for Clifton family of Tŷ Mawr, Llanfrynach. The Clifton daughters taught him to read English. He saved £21 to pay for his own apprenticeship to Thomas Watkins, The Struet, Brecon, a painter, glazier and plumber. His parents had been members of the Established Church, but Thomas broke with family tradition and joined the Baptist church at Watergate during his time at Brecon and was baptised in the River Usk. At the end of his apprenticeship he left for London, walking all the way, a distance of 160 miles. During his four years' stay in London, he continued his studies.

In 1842, Price became a student at Pontypool Baptist College. After three and a half years, he accepted a call to the Aberdare Welsh Baptist chapel at Carmel, Monk Street, better known as Capel Pen-pound. He began his ministry there at the end of 1845, was ordained on 1 January 1846, and remained there, his only pastorate, for 42 years until his death on 29 February 1888. On 16 March 1847, he married Anne Gilbert, a widow and youngest daughter of Thomas David of Abernant-y-groes, Cwm-bach. They had a son, who died in infancy, and a daughter, Emily. Anne Price died on 1 September 1849.

== Nonconformist minister ==
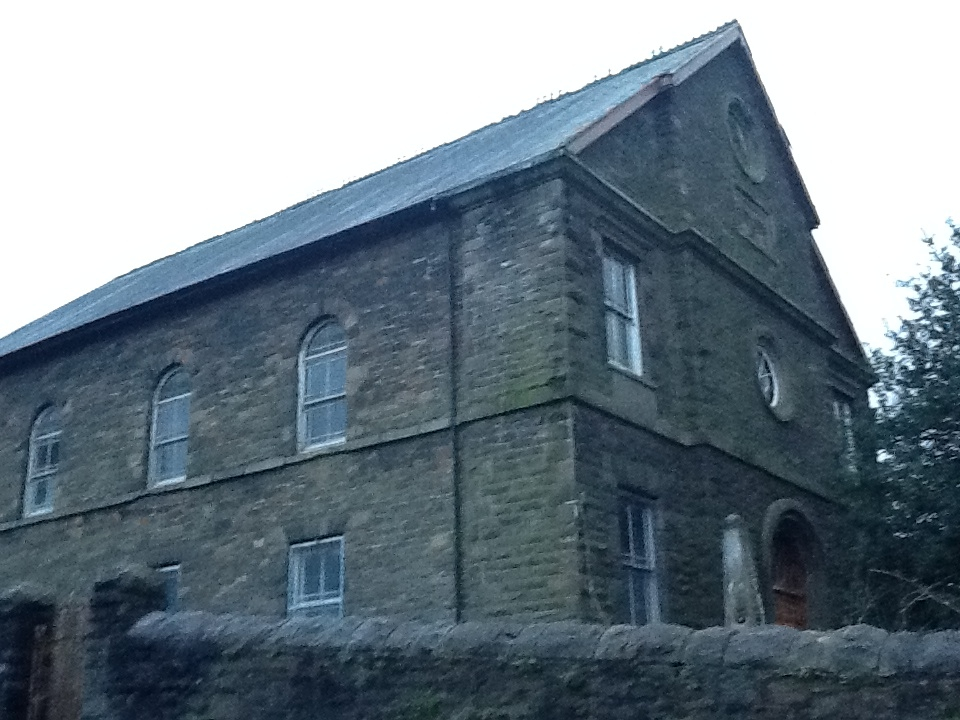
Calfaria, Aberdare, now closed, in 2014

Price arrived at Aberdare at a time when the fortunes of the town were being transformed by the development of industry, and specifically the growth of the coal trade. The existing building having become too small, a new chapel was erected nearby for the Welsh-speaking congregation, to be known as Calfaria. In 1856, 91 members from Calfaria were transferred to form an English Baptist Church at the former building, Carmel.

Through Price's skill as an organiser, he was able to further the Baptist cause, not only within his own church, but throughout the Aberdare valley, by opening Sunday schools and later erecting chapels to cater for the rapidly increasing population. During the mid-century years, Price was instrumental in the formation of additional Welsh Baptist causes. In 1855, the Heolyfelin Baptist Church was formed as a branch of the Hirwaun Baptist Church. Bethel, Abernant, was opened in 1857. In 1849 121 members were transferred to form Gwawr, Aberaman (see below); in 1855, 89 were released to start a cause at Mountain Ash, and in 1862, 163 were released to strengthen Bethel, Abernant; in the same year 131 were released to form a church in Ynyslwyd; in 1865, 49 were transferred to form Gadlys Church. In total, it is estimated that 927 members were released from Calfaria to form churches in various parts of the district. As these various chapels were established, Price maintained a connection between them and the mother church at Calfaria and he established, as a result, an overarching influence over the various Baptist congregations in the valley 'and provided the basis for a wider authority within the body of nonconformity as a whole in Aberdare'. This was underpinned by decisions such as that made at the monthly meeting of the Aberdare Valley Baptists on 22 July 1878 that the individual churches be encouraged to maintain joint meetings. The close interconnection and cohesion between the different Baptist congregations in the locality, allied with Price's leadership qualities, created a powerful influence upon the social and political life of the Aberdare Valley from the late 1840s, when Price figured prominently in the Blue Books controversy (see below), until the 1868 General Election and beyond.

In 1913, a local resident recalled: I remember that once a month on Sunday afternoons, Dr Price, the Baptist minister, used to baptise his recent converts in the Cynon River, alongside the iron bridge at the bottom of Commercial Street. I have seen as many as 25 or 30 converts, men and women, on the same afternoon. On these occa- sions the whole of the Baptist community used to meet at the chapel and march ii procession through the streets with the converts, the men converts being attired in long black robes and the women in white. They marched through the streets from the chapel to the place of baptism singing hymns. As a matter of course, large crowds gathered on the river banks to witness the immersions.

In general, the growth of the Baptist community within the Aberdare Valley was driven by enthusiasm. However, there were occasional conflicts. The most dramatic occurred in the early history of Gwawr, Aberaman. Price had been in instrumental in establishing the new cause but he soon became embroiled in a conflict with its new minister, David Bevan Jones, known as Dewi Elfed. Dewi Elfed was accused of supporting the beliefs of the Latter Day Saints, or Mormons, and the congregation at Gwawr were expelled from the Glamorgan Baptist Association. Soon after, the Baptists took legal action to recover the building, In November 1851, Price led a march to recover the building. On their arrival at Gwawr, it became apparent that Dewi Elfed had locked himself inside the chapel, along with one of his supporters. A court official stated that he did not have the authority to gain entry by forcing the door. Price then entered the building along with a deacon and there followed'a wild and exciting chase around the chapel galleries'., Eventually, Dewi Elfed was caught, and thrown out of the chapel by Price.

By the mid-1850s, Price had become well known as a preacher and lecturer, and was elected to important offices; in 1865 he occupied the chair of the Welsh Baptist Union. His marriage had given him an income that lay beyond the means of most nonconformist ministers, and on his wife's early death in 1847 Price inherited her estate. Through his social standing, as well as his political activities (see below) Price forged a close link with some of the leading businessmen of the Aberdare valley.

As a writer he published many books, addresses and pamphlets, but was better known as the co-editor of the newspapers Y Gwron (1855–60), Y Gweithiwr (1859–60), and Seren Cymru (1860–76); he served as finance secretary to (1853–59), and edited Y Medelwr Ieuanc and Y Gwyliedydd. Of these publications, the most significant was Seren Cymru, ostensibly a Baptist denominational journal, but turned by Price into a local and national newspaper of some significance which had an important political influence throughout Wales.

== Education ==
Price came to prominence at the time of the publication of the 1847 Report on the State of Education in Wales, commonly known as the Blue Books. The inhabitants of Aberdare had been particularly incensed by the evidence submitted by the recently appointed vicar of the parish, John Griffith. Griffith had made allegations about what he considered to be the degraded character of the women of Aberdare relative to the men, the fact that sexual promiscuity was an accepted social convention, the drunkenness and improvidence of the miners, and the exaggerated emotion involved in the religious practices of the Nonconformists.

Price took advantage of the opportunity to respond and a public meeting was arranged at Siloa Chapel, which was reported to have been attended by two thousand people. Price gave a speech at this meeting, which served to establish himself as a public speaker who could give expression to the aspirations of the substantial nonconformist community at Aberdare. Also at this meeting, two local coal owners, David Williams (Alaw Goch) and David Davis, Maesyffynnon also spoke. Griffith did not attend the meeting but the argument subsequently became highly personalised with Price and Griffith expressing two distinct religious and political standpoints.

Price acknowledged that the Commissioners' criticisms of the nonconformists for their failure to address educational deficiencies had a basis in fact. Soon after, he became the first secretary of the Aberdare British School Committee which established the first British School in the Aberdare valley in 1848, the Park School, better known as Ysgol y Comin. As a result of this controversy, Price not only emerged as a champion of nonconformity in Aberdare, but also became as influential as local industrialists in the public life of the locality.

In later years, Price became an advocate of university education in Wales. In December 1870 he joined with Kilsby Jones, John Griffiths (Gohebydd) and others in addressing a public meeting on the subject at Aberdare.

== Local government ==
The reaction to the 1847 Reports and the subsequent efforts to establish a British School at Aberdare had a wider social and political significance since it created an alliance between nonconformists ministers and the emerging middle-class of tradesmen and professional men, who were in the main Welsh by birth, on contrast to the ironmasters. For Price, it was the starting point of a career in local government. In 1853, he replaced the vicar of Aberdare, John Griffith as a member of the Merthyr Tydfil Board of Guardians. This was a notable landmark in that no nonconformist minister had previously been elected to such a local body in Aberdare. In later years the proliferation of nonconformist ministers on public bodies would become a feature of the local politics of the Aberdare Valley and the election of Price in 1853 was therefore an important starting point. At this stage, Price served as a Guardian for only two years but returned to the Board in the early 1870s.

In 1853 Price participated in the enquiry into public health in Aberdare. In 1854, he became one of the inaugural members of the Aberdare Local Board of Health. On this Board, Price become closely allied with Richard Fothergill despite their having come into conflict over the truck shop issue (see Trade Unionism and Industrial Relations, below). In 1857–58 Price supported Fothergill when the latter temporarily retired from public life following allegations of improper behaviour during an election.

Price resumed his membership of the Board of Health in 1866 when he was elected at the head of the poll, and it was stated in the local press that "most people will rejoice very much to see the Rev. Dr. Price once more actively engaged in parish matters".

== Friendly societies, trade unionism and industrial relations ==
Price took a prominent part as he did in furthering the work of the Friendly Societies, particularly those of the Independent Order of Oddfellows, and the Ivorites. He held honorary offices in both organisations and there is little doubt that these activities contributed to the prestige in which Price was held by the working classed of Aberdare by the 1860s.

Price also gained a reputation as a campaigner and, in 1851, he played a prominent role in the successful attempt to prevent the Aberdare Iron Company of Richard Fothergill from running a truck system at their Abernant works. This followed a public meeting at Aberdare, where Price proposed the formation of an Anti-Truck Society. The campaign against the truck system did not, however, receive full support from the working classes and an attempt by Price to repeat his success at Aberdare amongst Fothergill's workers at Treforest, Pontypridd was a failure. There is even some ambivalence over whether the truck system was abolished completely at Aberdare as the company shop itself continued to function until 1868 when Fothergill, enthusiastically supported by Price, was a candidate at the General Election.

The political radicalism which Price espoused stopped well short of supporting trade unionism as was demonstrated during several industrial disputes in the Aberdare Valley during the 1850s and 1860s when Price advocated a return to work. This was seen most notably the Aberdare Strike (1857–58), which was staged in opposition to the imposition of a 20 per cent reduction in the wages of miners across much of the South Wales coalfield. At a public meeting at Aberdare during the dispute, Price urged the men to return to work. Price's apparent support for the view of Henry Austen Bruce during this dispute was brought up by his opponents during the General Election of 1868.

== Parliamentary politics ==
Thomas Price first became involved in parliamentary elections at the 1852 by-election in the Merthyr Boroughs constituency which followed the death of Sir J.J. Guest. In 1857 he focused his energies on the Glamorgan county constituency, supporting the successful campaigns of C.R.M. Talbot and Hussey Vivian to be re-elected.

Price began to gain prominence beyond his own locality in the early 1860s when he became involved with the Liberation Society, which sought as a long-term aim the disestablishment of the Church of England. Through some of its leading figures such as Henry Richard, the Society regarded Wales as a being potentially responsive to its message given the strength of nonconformity. The essence of its message in Wales was that the nonconformist majority should be reflected in the parliamentary representation.

=== 1866 Brecon by-election ===
In early 1866 a by-election arose in the borough constituency of Brecon, following the death of Col. John Watkins who had held the seat intermittently since 1832. Price had connections with Brecon since his younger days and his candidature was first mooted in December, for example at a meeting of the Gwron Lodge of the Alfredian Order at Aberdare. Brecon had one of the smallest electorates in Wales, around 200, of whom half were estimated to be nonconformists. Some of the Brecon nonconformists invited Price to contest the seat. He issued an address in early January: "I have waited with considerable interest, but hitherto in vain, hoping that a gentleman of local influence and of advanced liberal principles would come forward to seek your suffrages; neither of the candidates now before the electors is prepared to advocate measures that would have had the hearty support of your late respected Member; and, firmlv believing that neither of the addresses already issued contains & programme suitable to the wishes of the great majority of the Independent Electors of the Borough of Brecon, or the wants of the period in which we live, I beg most respectfully to offer myself as a candidate for the honour of representing my native town in Parliament."

On 24 January 1866, Price addressed a packed meeting held at the Town Hall, with hundreds reportedly failing to gain admittance. The speech he gave on this occasion was regarded as "a very remarkable performance". He eventually withdrew on the grounds that Brecknock had issued a more Liberal address.

Later in 1866, Lord Brecknock was elevated to the Lords on the death of his father, Price was disappointed that his erstwhile nonconformist allies in the town supported the claims of the late member's brother-in law, Lord Alfred Spencer Churchill over those of radical candidates such as Henry Richard or E.M. Richards. As a result of his experiences in Brecon, Price focused his energies on parliamentary reform and the extension of the franchise.

=== 1868 Election ===
At the 1868 General Election, Merthyr Boroughs became a two-member constituency, and Price played a prominent role in the selection of a Liberal candidate to contest the second seat. He immediately emerged as a supporter of his old ally Richard Fothergill, arguing in an editorial in Seren Cymru that only if Fothergill declined an invitation to stand should the nomination be offered to a nonconformist radical. When another potential candidate, B.T. Williams called a meeting at Aberdare, Price used the occasion to declare his preference for Fothergill.

Price's role during the campaign contributed to the defeat of the sitting Liberal member, Henry Austen Bruce, who later became Home Secretary. His involvement with Fothergill (see above) had developed over many years.

Bruce sought to regain the advantage over Fothergill by claiming that the company shop at Aberdare was still operational, having been embroiled in the truck controversy in 1851 (see above). The shop was subsequently closed.

At the 1874 election, when Richard and Fothergill were opposed by a labour candidate, Thomas Halliday, Price again played a prominent role in Fothergill's campaign in the Aberdare Valley, proposing a vote of thanks at a public meeting held in the town.

== Later years and death ==
Price's actions at the 1868 General Election and his failure to support Henry Richard made him unpopular in some quarters but he remained a prominent figure in the public life of the Aberdare Valley. He was taken ill in 1886 but resumed his duties before his death in 1888. At the time it was said that the Baptist chapels of the valley were his memorial.

== Publications ==
- The Christian Dispensation More Glorious Than the Mosaic. [A Sermon on 2 Cor. Iii. 9.]

== Sources ==
=== Books and Journals ===
- Jones, Ieuan Gwynedd (1964). "Dr Thomas Price and the election of 1868 in Merthyr Tydfil: a study in nonconformist politics (Part One)" (PDF). Welsh History Review. 2 (2): 147–172.
- Jones, Ieuan Gwynedd (1965). "Dr Thomas Price and the election of 1868 in Merthyr Tydfil: a study in nonconformist politics (Part Two)" (PDF). Welsh History Review. 2 (3): 251–70.
- Jones, Ieuan Gwynedd (1987). Communities. Essays in the Social History of Victorian Wales. Llandysul: Gomer. ISBN 0863832237.
- Turner, Christopher B. (1984). "Religious revivalism and Welsh Industrial Society: Aberdare in 1859". Llafur: The Journal of the Society for the Study of Welsh Labour History. 4 (1): 4–13.

=== Newspapers ===
- Aberdare Leader
- Aberdare Times
- Cardiff and Merthyr Guardian
- Cardiff Times
- Merthyr Telegraph
- Seren Cymru
- Welshman

=== Online ===
- Rammell, Thomas Webster (1853). "Report to the General Board of Health on a preliminary inquiry into the sewerage, drainage, and supply of water, and the sanitary condition of the inhabitants of the inhabitants of the parish of Aberdare in the county of Glamorgan". Internet Archive. General Board of Health.
