= Gadlys Chapel =

Coordinates: 51.7181°N 3.4520°W

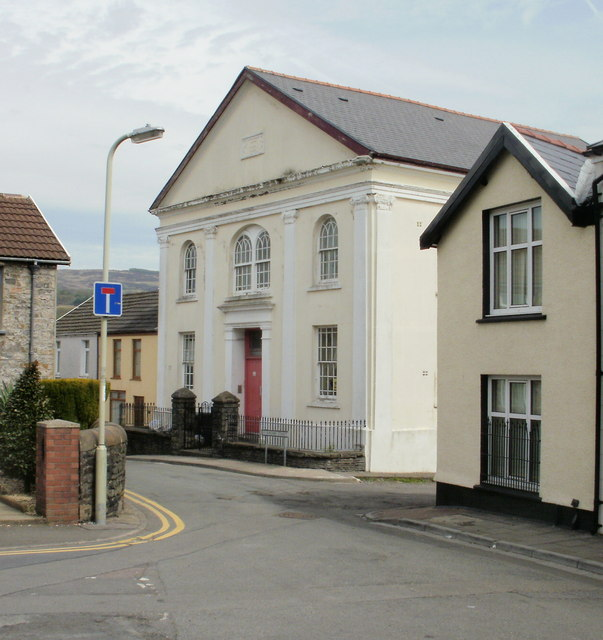
- Gadlys Chapel
- Location: Railway Street, Trecynon, Aberdare
- Country: Wales
- Denomination: Baptist

History
- Founded: 1864

Architecture
- Heritage designation: Grade II
- Designated: 1 October 1991
- Architectural type: Chapel
- Style: Late 19th century
- Closed: 1980

Gadlys Chapel was a Baptist chapel in Railway Street, Gadlys, Aberdare, Wales. It was built as a branch church of Calfaria Chapel in Aberdare.

== History ==
The cause of its formation began in 1858. It began as a Sunday school held in various houses until a schoolroom was built and opened on 6 February 1859. 49 members were released from Calfaria, Aberdare to form a new chapel at Gadlys. It was built in 1864 on a land leased from Dr. J.L. Roberts of Gadlys Uchaf Estate. The architect of the building was Thomas Joseph and the building cost were £675.

Its first baptism took place on 5 April 1863.

=== Benjamin Evans at Gadlys ===
He was the church's minister from 1876 until his death in 1900. he is also known as the 'Bishop of Gadlys'.

== Twentieth Century ==
The history of Gadlys in the twentieth century was characterized by a series of comparatively brief ministries, none of which lasted for more than ten years. Myles Griffiths from Bangor College, but a native of Neath was inducted as minister in July 1902 at a service at which William Harris of Heolyfelin presided. He moved to Liverpool in 1906.

R. Gwenffrwd Hughes arrived from Valley and Caergeiliog in Anglesey in 1908. During his time at Gadlys, Hughes became involved with Liberal Party politics and was nominated as a candidate for a seat on the Board of Guardians in 1910. although he was not selected. After a brief ministry departed for Pontlottyn in 1910. Shortly afterwards, Hughes was married at Gadlys Chapel to Ethel, daughter of the late Benjamin Evans. In 1911 the membership stood at 195 members.

David Bassett, became the next minister in December 1912 and remained for ten years until his death on January 1, 1922. then after him J.H. Jones came from Laleston became minister in 1925 and remained minister for four years before moving to Bonymaen. He was followed by Thomas Richards, a student from Cardiff College who was inducted in 1933 and served for seven years before moving to Kensington Chapel, Brecon, in 1940. A new organ was installed in 1940.

Iorwerth Davies moved from lower down the valley at Calfaria, Abercynon, in 1946 and served until 1951. The minister from 1954 until 1957 was Gwyn Rogers.

== Closure ==
The chapel closed in 1980 and was later converted into flats.

== Bibliography ==
- Jones, Alan Vernon (2004). Chapels of the Cynon Valley. Cynon Valley Historical Society. ISBN 0953107612.
- Parry, Jon (1989). "Labour Leaders and Local Politics 1888–1902: The Example of Aberdare" (PDF). Welsh History Review. 14 (3): 399–416.
- Parry, R. Ifor (1964). "Crefydd yng Nghwm Aberdar, a Chyfraniad y Bedyddwyr". Undeb Bedyddwyr Cymru, Aberdar (in Welsh): 15–61.
- Undeb Bedyddwyr Cymru, Aberdâr (in Welsh). 1964.
