= St Matthew's Church, Abernant =

Church in Wales

St Matthew's, Abernant
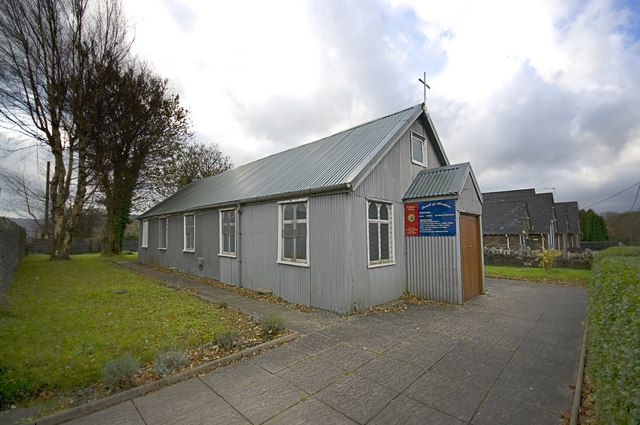
- St Matthew's Church
- St Matthew's, Abernant
- 51.720134°N 3.433376°W
- Denomination: Church in Wales

History
- Status: Active
- Founded: 1885
- Dedication: St Matthew

Architecture
- Completed: 1889

Specifications
- Capacity: 150
- Materials: metal, wood

Administration
- Diocese: Diocese of Llandaff
- Archdeaconry: Morgannwg
- Deanery: Cynon Valley
- Parish: Aberdare

St Matthew's Church, Abernant is in the Parish of Aberdare in Rhondda Cynon Taf. It is one of only a handful of tin tabernacles left in Wales.

The church, in Abernant, was founded by the congregation of St Elvan's Church, Aberdare as a Christian mission, later becoming a chapel of ease to St Elvan's. The fledgling congregation initially met in a tent, but in 1888-9 (some sources say 1891), chose to erect a proper building, the entire expense being borne by James Lewis of Plas Draw. The church was probably ordered by post and arrived in a prefabricated state, then was assembled on-site, this being a common practice with these buildings. The church was intended to only be used for around a decade, but in the event, it has remained at the location ever since.

Despite its stark, utilitarian appearance from outside, the church's interior is richly carpeted and the inside of the metal shell is lined with varnished wood. The church has some small though fine stained glass windows. Despite only being a nave, the church can seat 150 people and has a flourishing Sunday school.

The church's font dates from 1827. Before coming to St Matthew's, it belonged to a church in Port Talbot.
