= Heolyfelin Chapel =

Former chapel in Trecynon, Rhondda Cynon Taf, Wales

Coordinates: 51.7223°N 3.4565°W

Heol-y-felin
- Heol-y-felin
- Location: Bell Street, Trecynon
- Country: Wales
- Denomination: Baptist

History
- Founded: 1855

Architecture
- Heritage designation: Grade II
- Designated: 1 October 1991
- Architectural type: Chapel
- Style: Mid 19th century
- Closed: by Dec 2015

Heolyfelin Chapel, Trecynon, Aberdare (also spelled Heol-y-Felin) was a Welsh Baptist chapel established in 1855. Services were held in the Welsh language. The building seated 800. By December 2015 the chapel had closed and was for sale.

== Early history ==
The origins of the church at Heolyfelin date back to the 1840s, when prayer meetings and a Sunday school were established in the area that later became known as Trecynon. Heolyfelin, literally the 'Mill Road', refers to the Aberdare Ironworks at nearby Llwydcoed which were established in 1800. When Ysguborwen Colliery was opened at Llwydcoed in 1849, those who moved to the locality included many Baptists, and they initially held prayer meetings at the Wesleyan Chapel.

The chapel was designed in 1852 by Thomas Joseph, an engineer from Hirwaun who was involved in colliery enterprises at Aberdare. Heolyfelin was a branch of Ramoth, Hirwaun, although Thomas Price of Calfaria who was also instrumental in setting up the new cause. Thomas Joseph had opened a new colliery at Trecynon and he persuaded many colliers who were members at Ramoth to move with him from Hirwaun. The chapel cost £800 to build.

Soar, Llwydcoed was a branch of Heolyfelin.

There was a consistently high membership at Heolyfelin, between 350 and 500, from 1860 until the First World War. Membership peaked in 1906, soon after the 1904-1905 Welsh Revival, during which 95 new members were baptised at Heolyfelin in December 1904.

The first minister, from 1852 until 1861, was Benjamin Evans of Hirwaun. William Harries, president of the Baptist Union of Wales in 1891-2, was minister at Heolyfelin from 1862 to 1902. In 1877 Harries received a call from a church in Pembrokeshire but was eventually persuaded to remain at Heolyfelin.

== Twentieth century ==
He was succeeded by W. Cynog Williams who came to Heolyfelin from Pembrokeshire. Early in his ministry, classrooms for use by the Sunday School were erected. The Chapel was strengthened by the 1904 Religious Revival and on Sunday, 4 December 1904, 94 new members were baptised. Williams served from 1903 until 1941.

Herbert Davies came to Heolyfelin from Birkenhead in 1944. He left in 1947 and was succeeded by D. Meredith Morgan.

Today the chapel membership has declined to single figures.

== Sources ==
- Jones, Alan Vernon (2004). Chapels of the Cynon Valley. Cynon Valley Historical Society. ISBN 0953107612.
- Parry, R. Ifor (1964). "Crefydd yng Nghwm Aberdar, a Chyfraniad y Bedyddwyr". Undeb Bedyddwyr Cymru, Aberdar (in Welsh): 15–61.
- Turner, Christopher B. (1984). "Religious revivalism and Welsh Industrial Society: Aberdare in 1859" (PDF). Llafur: The Journal of the Society for the Study of Welsh Labour History. 4 (1): 4–13.
- Undeb Bedyddwyr Cymru, Y Rhos, Aberpennar (in Welsh). 1947.
- Undeb Bedyddwyr Cymru, Aberdâr (in Welsh). 1964.
