= Ynyslwyd Chapel, Aberdare =

Coordinates: 51.707680°N 3.436618°W

Ynyslwyd Chapel, Aberdare was a Baptist chapel in Sunny Bank Place, located between Aberaman and Aberdare. It was formed as a branch of Calfaria, Aberdare.

== Early history ==
Ynyslwyd was established in 1858 as a Sunday school although meetings were previously held in the long room of the Albion Inn, Cardiff Road, Aberaman, Aberaman. As with neighbouring chapels, including Gwawr, Aberaman, evidence suggests there was a closer link between early nonconformist chapels and public houses than has been thought. The chapel was built in 1862 by David Morgan of Treorchy and named Ynyslwyd after the estate which owned the land. The first minister was Thomas Davies.

== Later history ==
In 1935, T.E. Thomas came to Ynyslwyd from Nazareth, Blaenllechau, a church in the Rhondda Valley that Ynyslwyd played a role in its establishment many years before.

The chapel closed in 1996 and was demolished in 1998.

== Bibliography ==
- Jones, Alan Vernon (2004). Chapels of the Cynon Valley. Cynon Valley Historical Society. ISBN 0953107612.
- Parrry, R. Ifor (1964). "Crefydd yng Nghwm Aberdar, a Chyfraniad y Bedyddwyr" [Religion in the Aberdare Valley, and the Baptist Contribution]. Undeb Bedyddwyr Cymru, Aberdar (in Welsh): 15–61.
- Undeb Bedyddwyr Cymru, Y Rhos, Aberpennar (in Welsh). 1947.
- Undeb Bedyddwyr Cymru, Aberdâr (in Welsh). 1964.
