= Richard Fothergill (ironmaster) =

Richard Fothergill (1758–1821) was an ironmaster in South Wales and the founder of the Fothergill dynasty of ironmasters.

His sons were Richard Fothergill II (1789–1851), Thomas Fothergill (1791–1858), and Rowland Fothergill (1794–1871). His daughter, Ann, married in 1877 Sir Rose Lambert Price, bart.

His grandson Richard Fothergill III (1822–1903) was an ironmaster and Liberal politician who sat in the House of Commons from 1868 to 1880.
