= Hugh Evans (minister) =

Welsh Puritan minister

Hugh Evans (after 1616 − 1656) was a Welsh Puritan minister and itinerant preacher of Baptist views. Evans was the first minister in Wales to propagate Baptist doctrines, through the Welsh parishes, planting the ground for later ministers.

== Life ==
Hugh Evans was born after the year 1616 in Radnorshire, Wales, to a traditional Welsh family. In his youth, Evans went to the cathedral city of Worcester, in England, to be trained as a tailor's apprentice, where he resided until 1642. Soon after the outbreak of the English Civil War, Evans left Worcester and went north to live in Coventry, in the West Midlands.

Soon, Evans became convinced of baptizing only believers, and so joined the Baptist church of the city (Queens Road Baptist Church), formed after Puritan controversies inside the two Anglican parish churches of Coventry.

== Ministry ==
Hugh Evans was elected minister to Coventry Baptist Church around 1645 due his pastoral skills. During this time, Evans started considering about devoting himself to itinerant preaching in Wales, due to its "deplorable condition as overspread with gross darkness". His friends approved his decision; yet they advised Evans to firstly have a deeper literary and theological instruction. Following the advice, Evans ostensibly traveled to London to be placed under the tutorship and schooling of Jeremiah Ives, the respectable Nonconformist Baptist church leader at Old Jewry. After some time of theological education, Evans, along with Ives, went to Wales in 1646 or 1647 with the mission of preaching credobaptism, general atonement, and closed communion, until his death in 1656.
