= Richard Fothergill (politician) =

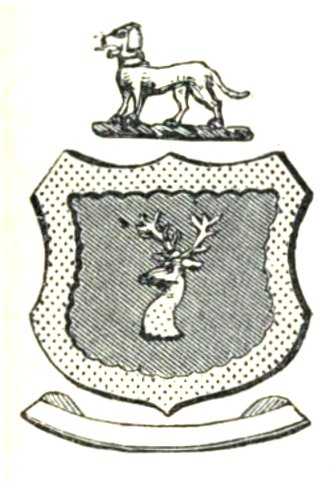
Richard Fothergill's coat of arms

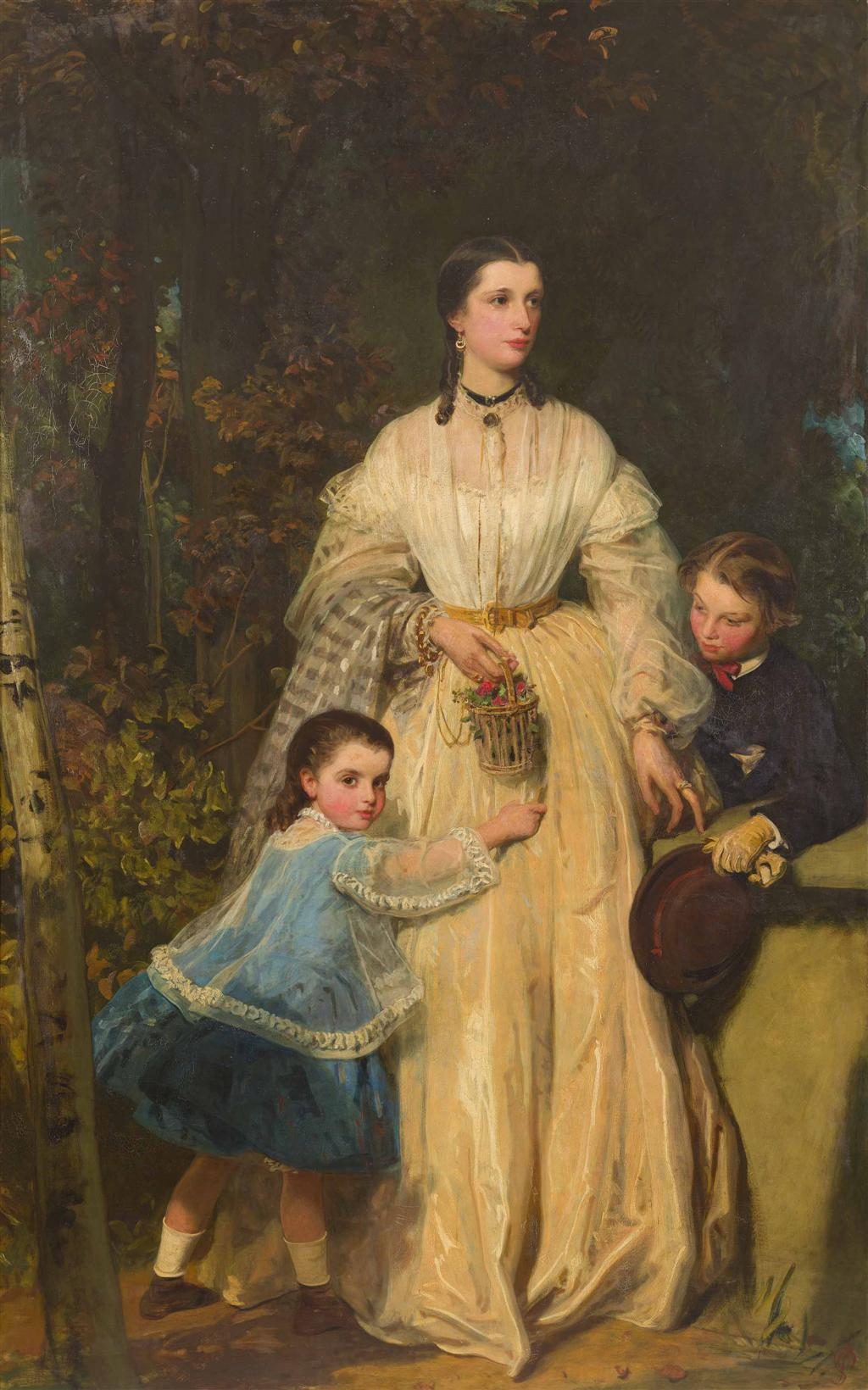
James Sant, Mary Fothergill and her children Richard and Mary. Oil on canvas, exhibited at the Royal Academy 1864. Fothergill's second wife.

Richard Fothergill (8 November 1822 – 24 June 1903) was an English ironmaster, a coalmine-owner in Wales and a Liberal politician who sat in the House of Commons from 1868 to 1880.

== Early life ==
Fothergill was the son of Richard Fothergill of Lowbridge House, near Kendal and his wife Charlotte Elderton, daughter of Charles Elderton, Esq. He was educated at the Military Academy, Edinburgh.

== Career ==
Fothergill succeeded his uncle Rowland Fothergill (1749–1871) as manager of the Aberdare iron-works and was later their proprietor. During this period a campaign was conducted against the company for their alleged support of the truck system. The campaign was led by Thomas Price of Calfaria, Aberdare, although ironically he and Fothergill soon buried their differences and became allies in the world of local politics.

In 1854 he was elected on the first Aberdare Local Board of Health and soon became its chairman. In 1857, however, Fothergill was prosecuted for alleged misconduct during the Board of Health election. The case was dismissed by the Police Court on the basis that intent could not be proved. As a result of this episode, Fothergill temporarily retired from public life although the episode served to strengthen the alliance between Fothergill and Thomas Price, who had been a fellow candidate at the election.

Following the closure of the Aberaman Ironworks in 1858, Fothergill became the most substantial ironmaster in the Aberdare Valley, although his works at Llwydcoed and Abernant were small compared with those at Merthyr. In 1862 he acquired the Plymouth works near Merthyr where he developed the business significantly by introducing the hot-blast system . He also acquired the Penydarren works, and thus acquired at Merthyr almost as much prestige and popularity there as he had at Aberdare. He became J.P. and Deputy Lieutenant for Glamorgan and a J.P. for Pembrokeshire.

== Politics ==
At the 1868 general election, Merthyr Tydfil became a two-member constituency with a much-increased electorate as a result of the Reform Act 1867. Since the formation of the constituency, Merthyr Tydfil had dominated representation as the vast majority of the electorate lived in the town and its vicinity, whereas there was a much lower number of electors in the neighbouring Aberdare Valley. During the 1850s and 1860s, however, the population of Aberdare grew rapidly, and the franchise changes in 1867 gave the vote to large numbers of miners in that valley,

The middle-classes of the Aberdare Valley sought the right to select a second Liberal candidate and their choice soon fell upon Fothergill. He was also supported by the prominent Baptist minister, Thomas Price, with whom he has allied in the past. Price emerged as a supporter of Fothergill, arguing in an editorial in Seren Cymru that only if he declined an invitation to stand should the nomination be offered to a nonconformist radical.

The sitting member, Henry Austen Bruce, remained unpopular as a result of his actions during the Aberdare strike 1857–1858, although it initially appeared that the Fothergill would be elected to the second seat alongside Bruce. However, the appearance of a third Liberal candidate, Henry Richard, a nonconformist radical popular in both Merthyr and Aberdare, left Bruce on the defensive and he was ultimately defeated, finishing in third place behind both Richard and Fothergill. Fothergill held the seat until 1880. In parliament he was a strong advocate for South Wales coal for use by the navy. In 1869, he was one of the original members of the Iron and Steel Institute, and in 1871 he became a member of its council.

By 1879, Fothergill was in financial difficulties and there were calls for him to step aside. A deputation of tradesmen and working men held a meeting at Swansea to request to stand as a candidate again, but he eventually declined.

== Family ==
Fothergill married firstly in 1848, Elizabeth Lewis daughter of Edward Lewis and had one daughter Elizabeth. She died in 1849 and he married secondly in 1850, Mary Roden, daughter of William Roden of Grindal Hall, Salop. Richard and Mary had six children.

== Later life ==
Fothergill built a mansion and gardens at Aber-nant which is known as "Fothergill's Park" and which has since been the home of St Michael's College and the Aberdare hospital. He retired to Tenby where he died at the age of 80.

== Bibliography ==
- Jones, Ieuan Gwynedd (1964). "Dr. Thomas Price and the election of 1868 in Merthyr Tydfil : a study in nonconformist politics (Part One)" (PDF). Welsh History Review. 2 (2): 147–172.
- Jones, Ieuan Gwynedd (1965). "Dr Thomas Price and the election of 1868 in Merthyr Tydfil: a study in nonconformist politics (Part Two)" (PDF). Welsh History Review. 2 (3): 251–70.

Parliament of the United Kingdom
Preceded by Henry Bruce	Member of Parliament for Merthyr Tydfil; 1868 – 1880; With: Henry Richard	Succeeded by Henry Richard; Charles James
