= Abercwmboi =

Coordinates: 51.689722°N 3.4125°W

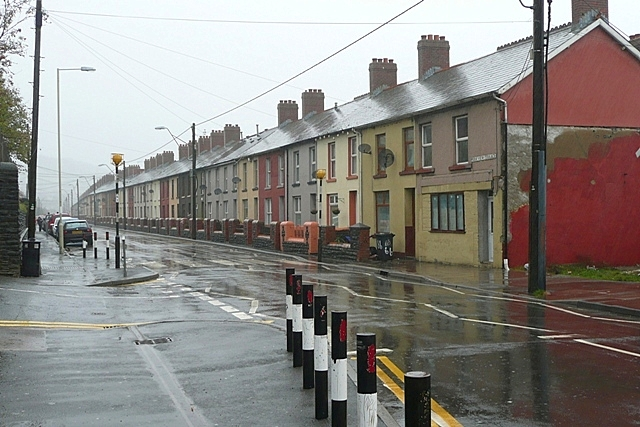
- Park View Terrace, Abercwmboi

- Location within Rhondda Cynon Taf
- Principal area: Rhondda Cynon Taf
- Preserved county: Mid Glamorgan
- Country: Wales
- Sovereign state: United Kingdom
- Post town: ABERDARE
- Postcode district: CF44
- Dialling code: 01443
- Police: South Wales
- Fire: South Wales
- Ambulance: Welsh
- UK Parliament: Merthyr Tydfil and Aberdare
- Senedd Cymru – Welsh Parliament: Cynon Valley

Abercwmboi is a village in the county borough of Rhondda Cynon Taf, Wales.

== Location ==
Abercwmboi is a village in the Cynon Valley.

The village lies on the B4275 Cardiff Road - the old main route to Cardiff before the A4059 road was built - between Aberdare and Mountain Ash. It is the most south-easterly named settlement that, for postal reasons, is included in the town of Aberdare.

== Name ==
Abercwmboi - earlier Abercynfoi, translated: 'mouth of the Cynfoi'. Cynfoi is the name of the stream. Aberconfoi Ycha/Issa 1570 were farms named after the stream that enters the Cynon river there.

Before 1905 the village was named Capcoch (red cap). The primary school and local pub / inn still have the name. The remains of the original Cap Coch Inn, can be found on the mountainside, above the village. The first streets to be built in Cap Coch were, John Street, Jenkin Street, Mary Street, Margaret Street, Richard Street and William Street. The beginning of Park view terrace near to the school, was also built near this time. The village boasted two main chapels, both of which carried out their services through the medium of Welsh - Bethlehem and Bethesda Chapels, of John Street.

== History ==
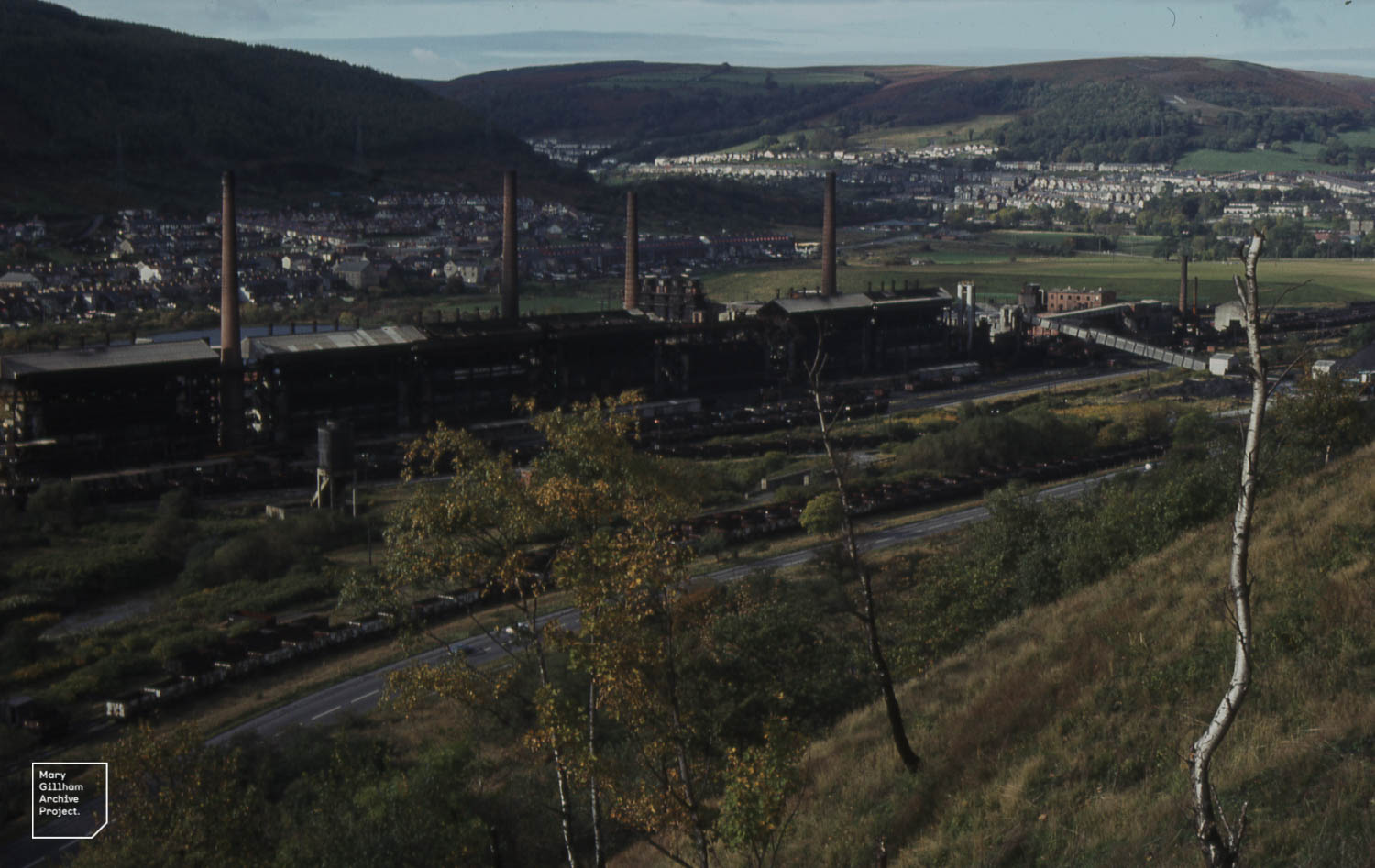
Phurnacite smokeless fuel factory (1984)

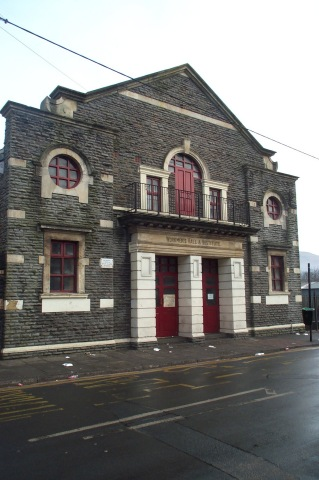
Abercwmboi Workmen's Hall

Abercwmboi Workmen's Hall (paid for out of the miners' contributions) has been the base for many trips and events, with the miners taking their families on day trips, as a community. The hall has also been used as a cinema and a public house over the years.

A yearly village carnival was held in the village. Every street would work on a 'float' and a theme. Then these floats would parade around the village and fete would follow in the local school. The winning float would then join the Aberdare carnival in the summer, and hope to win that parade. This tradition stopped in the 1980s.

Abercwmboi and the closure of its Phurnacite factory feature in the book Among Others by Jo Walton.

There were large lakes near to the village on which there were swans and other waterfowl. Lord Aberdare would ride around these lakes and catch the birds. Many of these lakes have since been removed. The largest was filled in by the 'Macleans tip', and factories have since been built on this area.

Remains of the Abercwmboi colliery can still be seen on the mountainside above Bronallt Terrace and close to 'Peggy Pit's' house.

Back in the 1940s the village boasted over 40 shops throughout the village, from Mr. Tom Jones' shop, to the Co-op, to Beynons shop etc. 'Parry's Bakery' was a famous bakery, found in Bronallt Terrace and was visited by hundreds of people from all over the Cynon Valley and beyond.

The original Cap Coch primary school had to be demolished (1980–81) and a new school built on the site (after much campaigning by the mothers of the village). The old school's yard fell into a mine shaft and made the area unstable. The children as a result, had to travel by bus each day to attend the Aman school. The mothers of the village fought long and hard, and travelled to the Welsh Office in Cardiff, to have the school rebuilt, and for the area to be made safe.

There are several remains of Abercwmboi's industrial past. The levels behind Park view Terrace and the remains of the colliery behind Bronallt Terrace. The 'Brick works' in Aberaman (old Aldi site), would have employed many from the village, too. Pipes and bricks were made there. Also the Phurnacite lands are still evidence of the past of the village. This has since become a haven for wildlife in the area.

Abercwmboi was also called 'Little Moscow' by many local people in the valleys during the 1920s miners' strike. Abercwmboi, hit badly economically, forced many of the miners to look for work elsewhere. There was fighting and unrest, and both the police and army were called in to control the miners in Abercwmboi.

Several people from the village were members of Côr Mawr, a large choir conducted by 'Caradog' whose statue is in Aberdare town centre. The choir won choral competitions at The Crystal Palace in London in 1872 and 1873.

The village was mostly Welsh speaking until the 1900s. A Welsh language Baptist chapel, Bethesda remains open in 2016. The 1891 census showed that nearly all residents of the oldest streets John Street and Jenkin Street, were first-language Welsh speakers.

Recently, there have been many Iron Age finds in the Abercwmboi area, proving the area has been inhabited for thousands of years.

Although for postal reasons the village comes under the town of Aberdare, its telephone std code is 01443, the code for Pontypridd Exchange, not Aberdare's 01685.

It is at the southern end of Aberdare Parish, therefore is a part of Aberdare.
