= Hirwaun =

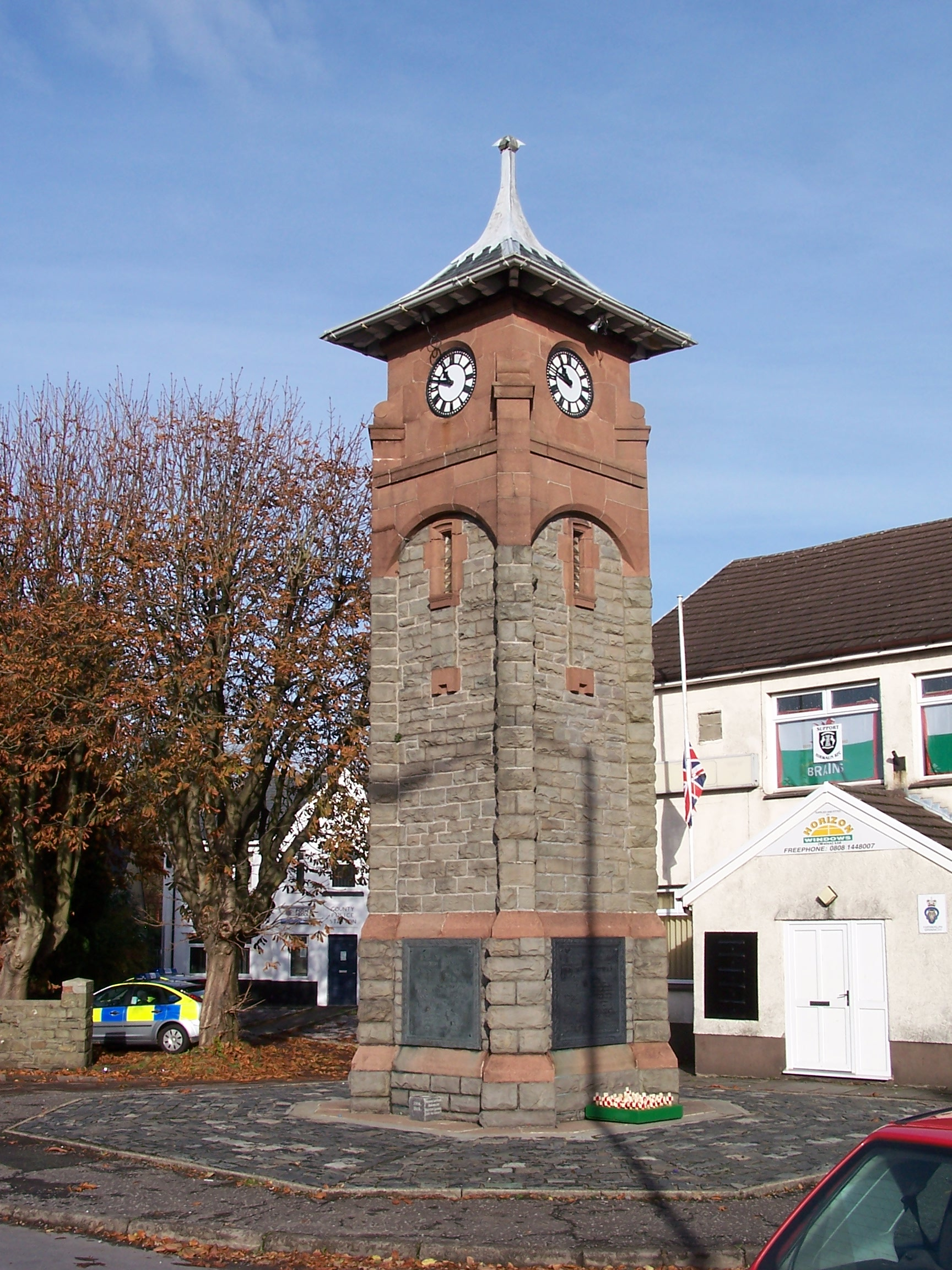
- Hirwaun War Memorial

- Location within Rhondda Cynon Taf
- Population: 5,237
- OS grid reference: SN966055
- Principal area: Rhondda Cynon Taf
- Preserved county: Mid Glamorgan
- Country: Wales
- Sovereign state: United Kingdom
- Post town: ABERDARE
- Postcode district: CF44
- Dialling code: 01685
- Police: South Wales
- Fire: South Wales
- Ambulance: Welsh
- UK Parliament: Merthyr Tydfil and Aberdare
- Senedd Cymru – Welsh Parliament: Cynon Valley
- List of places UK Wales Rhondda Cynon Taf 51.739°N 3.513°W Community map: Map of the community

Hirwaun (/ˈhɪərwaɪn/, locally /ˈhɜːrwɪn/; Welsh pronunciation: [ˈhɪrwai̯n]) is a village and community at the north end of the Cynon Valley in the County Borough of Rhondda Cynon Taf, South Wales. It is 4 miles (6 km) NW of the town of Aberdare, and comes under the Aberdare post town. The 2021 United Kingdom Census documented that Hirwaun had a population of 5,237. The village is on the Heads of the Valleys Road and at the southern edge of the Brecon Beacons National Park.

== Toponymy ==
Hirwaun (also formerly spelled as Hirwain, Herwain and Hyrwen) derives from two common Welsh toponyms: hir meaning "long" and gwaun (mutated to waun) meaning moorland. Thomas Morgan (1887) stated that the correct name is Hirwaun Gwrgant, meaning Gwrgan's "gwaun". This name comes from its association with Gwrgan ab Ithel (1033–1070), a king of Morgannwg who is said to have freely given a portion of the gwaun (named "Y Waun Hir") to his poor subjects and all other Welshmen for raising corn, and the breeding of sheep and cattle. Morgan also stated that in olden times the gwaun extended from Blaengwrach (near Rhydgroes) to Mountain Ash, a length of nearly ten miles.

== Industry ==
=== Iron production ===
In 1720-1723, Benjamin Tanner, a Brecon ironmonger, and Richard Wellington, the owner of Hay Castle, founded the Brecon Ironworks, a furnace and a forge one mile north of the town on the bank of the River Honddu, and a forge at Pipton near Glasbury on the Afon Llynfi. Lloyd (1906) observed that iron ore and limestone for the Brecon furnace 'were conveyed in sacks on the backs of horses and mules from the open patch workings at Hirwain [sic], eighteen miles distant, and elsewhere'. Lloyd (1906) later observed:

'after the partnership in the Hirwain Iron-works between John Maybery and John Wilkins commenced in 1760, the Brecon Furnace and Forge and the Pipton Forge were worked by them as part of the common partnership. Also, that being able to procure pig-iron from their iron furnace at Hirwain, the Brecon Furnace fell into disuse.'

D. Ben Rees (1975), a nonconformist minister, documented that prior to 1780 Hirwaun had an ironworks which was 'a small-scale undertaking'. However, in 1780 it was leased to Anthony Bacon of Cyfarthfa, who 'decided to manufacture heavy cannon for the American war.' However, he was unable to do so because he was a Member of Parliament, for Aylesbury. Consequently, he worked under the name of Francis Homfray, who came from the village of Wales in South Yorkshire. Rees (1975) invoked Parry (1967) in support of his observation that the finished product was transported to the port of Cardiff by mules and pack-horses. English scholar Benjamin Heath Malkin (1807) observed in his compendium of South Wales:

'I did not visit, and of course do not describe, either the works of Aberdare belonging to Mr. Scales, or Hirwaen Furnace, at the distance of four miles to the north, whose columns of smoke, rising from its station at the black and barren extremity of this Alpine vale, obscure and stifle those rural images, produced on the fancy by the sportive creations of nature. Such arrangements are every where similar; and I was to see the most extensive and perfect hereafter, I was glad to escape from the contusion of anvils, the blast of furnaces, and the whirl of wheels.'

Rees (1975) later observed that 'Bacon expanded the industry with skill and initiative, so that when he died in 1786 he was one of the richest men in England.' His sons, Anthony and Thomas, were too young to inherit the furnace. Consequently the Court of Chancery decided to place it under the management of Samuel Glover who operated the ironworks at Abercarn in Monmouthshire.

In 1799 both sons came of age. However, neither of therm was interested in the ironworks. Consequently, Anthony sold his interest in the ironworks to Thomas for £3,000, who in 1802 sold his interest in the furnace 'to a company which included Jeremiah Homfray of Llandaff House.' Peace came in 1815 upon the conclusion of the Napoleonic Wars, with the consequence that 'there was a decline in the demand for iron and Hirwaun suffered a severe slump.' Rees (1975) observed: 'William Crawshay the second, the "Iron King", had no difficulty in 1818 in buying outright the entire interest from Bacon at Hirwaun.'

In 1830, under the management of William Crawshay II, the ironworks produced 9,035 tons of iron, which required the supply of 33,715 tons of coal. 900 men were employed in Hirwaun, two thirds of whom 'were directly connected with the iron works.' The Crawshay family were powerful, almost all-powerful in the area. It owned a large portion of Hirwaun and even used their own currency, the Hirwaun Guinea, to pay employees, a form of truck system which stopped employees travelling to Cardiff or spending their money outside the controlled economy of the village. Crawshay expanded the works, leading to a population influx into the locality. The ironworks remained in family hands until its closure in 1859.

=== Coal mining ===
The blast furnaces of the ironworks needed coke, which spurred an increase in local coal mining, which was a major employer until the second half of the 20th century. Following the miners' strike in 1984–5, the only deep coal mine left in Wales was the nearby Tower Colliery, which British Coal shut in 1994. The colliery was then bought out by its workers, after which it reopened in 1995. It finally closed in 2008.

== Government ==
Rammell (1853) reported to the General Board of Health under the auspices of the Public Health Act of 1848 that Hirwaun contained about 1,500 inhabitants. Hirwaun had its own seat on Glamorgan County Council from 1889. The first member elected was Sir William Thomas Lewis, later Lord Merthyr. Hirwaun was also part of the Aberdare Urban District Council area.

According to the 2021 United Kingdom Census, Hirwaun had a population of 5,237. Until 2022 Hirwaun was the name of an electoral ward to Rhondda Cynon Taf County Borough Council, electing one county borough councillor. Following a boundary review, it was merged with neighbouring Rhigos to become 'Hirwaun, Penderyn and Rhigos', electing two councillors.

== Gallery ==
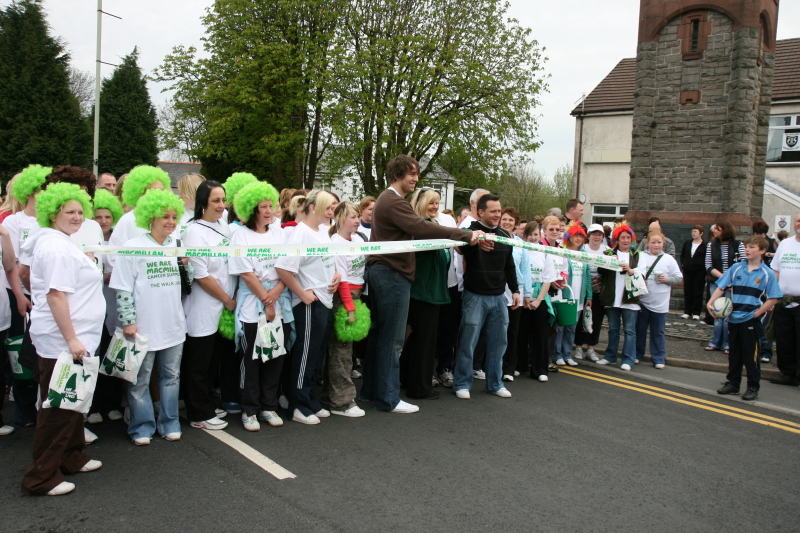
Macmillan Cancer Support Charity Walk with Ryan Jones Hirwaun to Abercynon, April 26, 2008

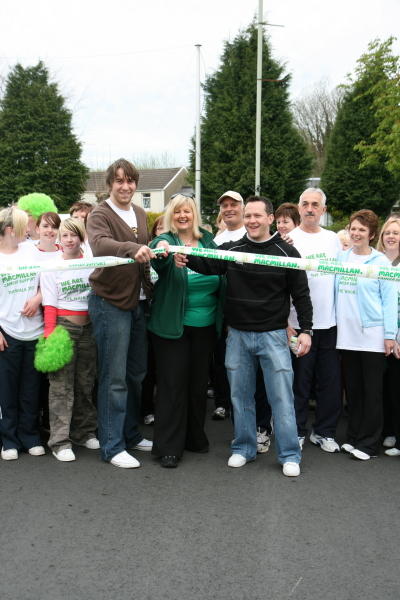

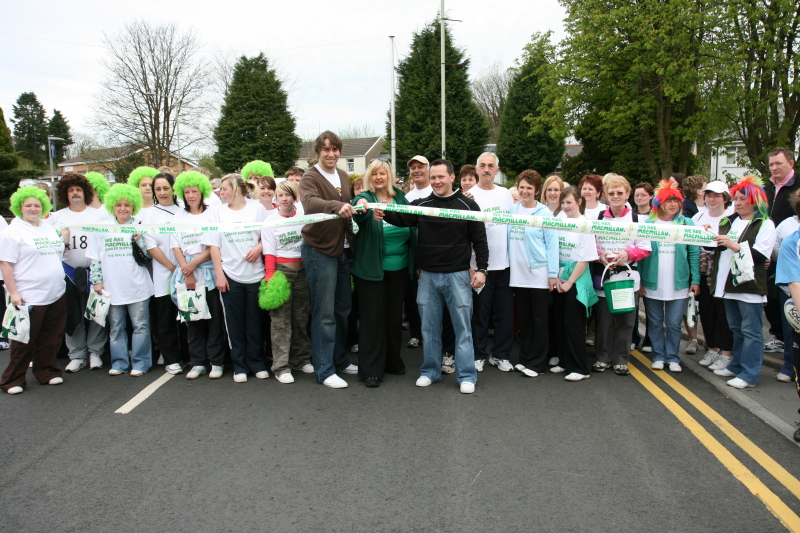

== Religion ==
=== St Lleurwg's Church ===
Saint Lleurwg's parish church is in the centre of the village, in the ecclesiastical parish of Hirwaun. It was opened by Alfred Ollivant, Bishop of Llandaff in July 1858. The sister church in the parish, in Penywaun, is dedicated to Saint Winefred.

=== Saint Therese Of Lisieux Church ===
The first Roman Catholic Church was established in the Mission Room overlooking the Iron Works (built 1880 demolished in 1969). The present day church was built in 1965.

=== Nonconformist chapels ===
There were a number of nonconformist chapels in Hirwaun village, most dating from its early days as an industrial settlement when large numbers of people arrived from rural Wales. The chapels included Ramoth (Baptist), Nebo (Congregationalist) and Soar (Wesleyan Methodist).

During the 1904-05 Religious Revival, Evan Roberts, the main instigator of the movement, visited the village.

== Architecture ==
Unlike most South Wales Coalfield villages, Hirwaun has an array of different architectural housing styles, often cheek-by-jowl in small blocks. This is due to developments to satisfy different needs at different times, with much gentrification in the last few decades. So Hirwaun has a discontinuous, hotch-potch feel to it that marks it out as unusual in the South Wales Valleys.

=== The tower blocks ===
Hirwaun made local news in May 2004 when its two 1960s-built tower blocks were demolished by dynamite detonation. Their demise marked the end of a major landmark in the Cynon Valley and was symptomatic of a broader failure in the design of British public housing.

=== Hirwaun Common development ===
Currently the patch of green land known as Hirwaun Common is being strip mined again. This was first done in the 1940s and 1950s.

== Transport ==
The village was originally served by Hirwaun railway station on the Vale of Neath Railway, which arrived in 1851. At Gelli Tarw Junction east of the station, the mainline from Neath to Merthyr Tydfil met the Vale of Neath Railway branch to Aberdare and the Aberdare Railway. South of the station were the goods yard and sidings which served the various industries in the area, including Hirwaun Ironworks, Tower Colliery, two brickworks, and Penderyn quarry tramway.

With the Beeching Axe in 1963, the lines south to Neath and north to Merthyr and the former Aberdare Railway were all closed. Hirwaun station was demolished. The line north to Aberdare on the Merthyr Line to Cardiff Central was only kept open for coal traffic to Tower Colliery, which moved its coal washery and loading facility onto the site of the former sidings near the Rhigos industrial estate.

After the second closure of Tower in early 2008, in November 2009 the Welsh Assembly Government (WAG) asked Network Rail to conduct a feasibility study on reopening the line to Hirwaun for passenger services. After clearing the line of vegetation, Network Rail submitted its report to WAG. Currently, no decision has been made as to whether the line from Hirwaun to Aberdare will reopen. The Robertstown crossing will be a deciding factor. However, the Welsh Government have added the extension of the line to the map of the South Wales Metro Light Rapid Transit System, which is planned to take over the line from Cardiff Bay to Aberdare and then to Hirwaun.

== Sports ==
Hirwaun Recreational Ground, known locally as the Welfare Ground, is the main sporting facility in the village. The ground has one soccer field, one Rugby Union field, two tennis courts (hard surface) and a bowling green. The ground has its own dedicated floodlit training area.

=== Rugby ===
Hirwaun RFC currently play rugby football in the Welsh Rugby Union League (SWALEC League) 3b South Central.

=== Association Football ===
Hirwaun has Hirwaun FC (formerly Glancynon FC) playing association football in the Aberdare Valley Football League premier division.

=== Squash ===
The village has a squash team called Hirwaun Squash Federation, formed in 2012. They play from the local Aberdare Sports Centre and compete in the South Wales Squash Association leagues.

== Notable people ==
See also Category:People from Hirwaun

- Gareth Evans, film director
- Elizabeth Andrews, politician
