= Gwawr Chapel =

Former chapel in Aberdare, Rhondda Cynon Taf, Wales

Coordinates: 51.7023°N 3.4305°W

Gwawr, Aberaman was a Baptist chapel in Regent Street, Aberaman, near Aberdare, South Wales, formed as a branch of Calfaria, Aberdare

== Early history ==
Gwawr was formed in 1848 and the earliest meeting were held at the King William Inn, Cardiff Road, Aberaman. This provides evidence that there was a closer link between early nonconformist chapels and public houses than is often thought and that the cause commenced very early in the history of Aberaman as an industrial settlement when the local seams of the locality began to be exploited by Crawshay Bailey and David Davis, Blaengwawr. The chapel was built in 1849. 121 members were released from Calfaria, Aberdare to establish the church.

Later that year David Bevan Jones (Dewi Elfed) was called to minister the church. Jones apparently fell out with Price and the Baptist denomination and sought to associate the chapel with the Latter Day Saints. Price initiated legal action to reclaim the building and eventually led a march to the church which led to the minister being turned out in November 1851.

Following this turbulent episode, William Jones, an assistant preacher at Calfaria, Aberdare was ordained as minister at Gwawr. It can be assumed that this was arranged by Price so that he could prevent a recurrence of the previous difficulties. Jones was followed by another minister, D. Evans of Llaneurwg, who also remained for only a short period. In 1858, the Rev T Nicholas of Pembrey accepted a call to minister the church and was inaugurated on 26 December 1858. He remained at Gwawr until his death on 9 November 1865. In 1859, there were 270 members. During his ministry, new churches were formed as branches of Gwawr at Abercwmboi in 1860 and Seion, Cwmaman in 1861.

In 1866 the Rev Morgan Phillips of Tabor, Brynmawr accepted a call to minister Gwawr and was inaugurated on 30 April. By this time the original building proved to be to small as the population of Aberaman grew rapidly. Gwawr was rebuilt in 1870 at a cost of £1,707 and now had capacity for 850 people.was established as minister. Phillips resigned his ministry on 6 September 1874 and died soon afterwards.

== The pastorate of Thomas Davies, 1875–1908 ==
Thomas Davies was minister for 33 years, from 1875 until 1908. Davies was born in Llantood, Pembrokeshire, in 1845 and began his career as a schoolmaster at Blaenffos near his birthplace. He was persuaded to enter the ministry and was ordained at his first church in Llangynidr, Breconshire, where he remained for nine years. In 1875, he accepted a call to Aberaman as a successor to Morgan Phillips. Davies became a prominent figure in the Baptist denomination, served as secretary of the East Glamorgan Baptist association and wrote under the pseudonym, 'Didymus'. Thomas Davies remained at Aberaman for the remainder of his career and died in 1908 at the age of 62. A vestry was added during his ministry, in 1890, at a cost of £900.

== The pastorate of W. T. Francis, 1909– ==
W. T. Francis came to Aberaman from Aberduar, Llanybydder. He remained for only four years before moving to Calfaria, Llanelli.

Following his departure the Rev T. Lloyd Rees accepted a call and was inaugurated on 21 February 1915.

== 20th century ==
In 1916 there were 205 members and in 1925, 189. After the departure of T. Lloyd Rees in 1918, D.G. Harries became minister in 1920 and served until his death at a comparatively young age in 1941. J. Gwyn Davies was minister from 1945 until 1957 and was succeeded by T. Arfon Jones in 1960.

== Later history ==
By 1955 the membership had fallen to 66 with a further decline to 42 by 1963. In 1970 the congregation moved from the original building to the former Hebron Calvinistic Methodist church and the old Gwawr was demolished.

== Bibliography ==
- Jones, Alan Vernon (2004). Chapels of the Cynon Valley. Cynon Valley Historical Society. ISBN 0953107612.
- Parry, R. Ifor (1964). "Crefydd yng Nghwm Aberdar, a Chyfraniad y Bedyddwyr". Undeb Bedyddwyr Cymru, Aberdar (in Welsh): 15–61.
- Undeb Bedyddwyr Cymru, Y Rhos, Aberpennar (in Welsh). 1947.
- Undeb Bedyddwyr Cymru, Aberdâr (in Welsh). 1964.
