= Abernant, Rhondda Cynon Taf =

Coordinates: 51.721°N 3.428°W

Abernant: Welsh: Abernant-y-Wenallt
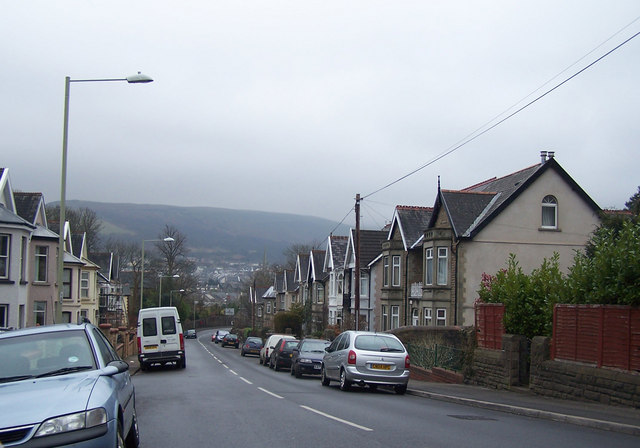

- Location within Rhondda Cynon Taf
- Community: Aberdare East
- Principal area: Rhondda Cynon Taf
- Preserved county: Mid Glamorgan
- Country: Wales
- Sovereign state: United Kingdom
- Police: South Wales
- Fire: South Wales
- Ambulance: Welsh
- UK Parliament: Merthyr Tydfil and Aberdare
- Senedd Cymru – Welsh Parliament: Cynon Valley

Abernant (or Abernant-y-Wenallt) is a small village north-east of the town of Aberdare, Rhondda Cynon Taf, Wales. Like many in the South Wales Valleys, it was once a coal-mining village.

== Etymology ==
Abernant is a shortening of the name "Abernant-y-Wenallt", and the area is recorded under this name in an 1800 lease of the land.

While the place-name element Aber is easily understand as a confluence of watercourses, (here referring to meeting of the Nant y Wenallt and the Cynon) the rest of the name is more debatable. The element -wen may refer to the colour white, or as an indicator that the place was in some way "blessed" or "holy". Similarly, the termination -allt commonly refers to an area of sloping hillside but can also denote the area as heavily wooded. Finally, In the language of South East Wales, nant refers to the watercourse itself, rather than the valley it sits in, therefore the name may be translated as either "the mouth of the white brook on the woody slope" or "the mouth of the blessed/holy brook on the woody slope".

== History ==
Thomas Dafydd Llewellyn states that the river "Nantywenallt" formed one of the ancient boundaries of the four Rhandir of the parish of Aberdare and that there were no workers houses anywhere in Aberdare in 1799. This would change in October 1800, when a lease of the lands and mines at Abernant y Wenallt was signed with the power to "sink (mine shafts), build furnaces, (and) divert water courses" for the next ninety-nine years. This would see dramatic changes to the area with the founding of the Abernant Ironworks and the building of the first workers houses by 1801. Among the earliest structures were the homes at Little Row and Moss Place in Abernant.

By 1819, the works had been taken over by Rowland Fothergill, and later passed to his nephew, Richard Fothergill. The streets of Abernant reflect the importance of industry in the area in the 19th century, with streets named Engineer's Row, Foreman's Row and Collier's Row etc.

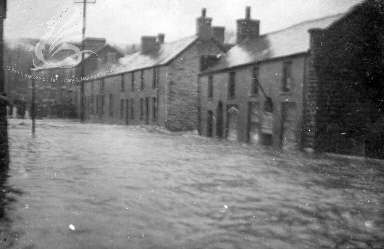
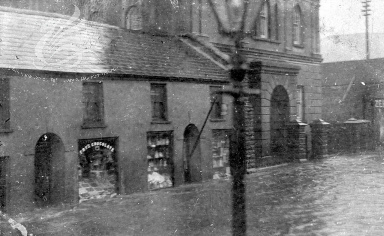
December 1912 flooding of Abernant Road

Abernant Railway Station opened in 1854 along the Vale of Neath branch line to Merthyr Tydfil. For some time the village was nicknamed The Trap, possibly because the Aberdare Iron Company Tramroad crossed the Parish Road to Abernant. The Marquis of Bute maintained a small cottage hospital in the area from 1875 until World War I, which was later used as the Trap Surgery until it was demolished in 1980.

A number of collieries operated in Abernant, many originally operated by the Aberdare Iron Company. The collieries were: Werfa No.1 (1846–1910); Werfa No. 2 (1879–1910); Mountain Pit (1866–1927); Blaennant Colliery (circa 1840–1927); Forge Pit (1851–1910) and River Level Colliery (circa 1840–1939). In 1896, a flooding disaster occurred at River Level Colliery which killed six colliers. The disaster occurred after it was inundated by water from the abandoned Ysguborwen Colliery. Although the Abedare Iron Company was responsible for the production of much coal in the Abernant area, it was never as well documented as some of the other works in the Rhondda Valley.

In December 1912, the village was subject to extensive flooding, the Abernant Road in particular. In the mid-1980s, NCB reported that they intended to reopen a mine in Abernant and exploit anthracite reserves.

The Abernant pit was shut down in 1988. This is an incorrect citation. The Abernant pit that closed in 1988 was in Carmarthenshire, West Wales, not this Abernant.

== Landmarks ==
Abernant House was built by James Birch, cofounder with Jeremiah Homfray of Abernant Ironworks. In 1819 the ironworks were sold and the house was passed to Rowland Fothergill and later his nephew Richard Fothergill. Richard Fothergill was responsible for adding many extensions to the original building and landscaping of the grounds. On 1 March 1892 Emma Talbot of Margam founded the St Michael's Theological College but in 1907 the college moved to Llandaff, Cardiff. Since 1917 Abernant House has been used as the site of Aberdare General Hospital. On 27 September 1929 a fire gutted the main building, destroying its notable interior furnishings too. The hospital later reopened in April 1933, and in 1939 W M Llewellyn funded the construction of a new maternity ward.

== Religion ==
The main active churches are:

- St Matthew's Mission Church, Church of Wales, opened 1888

There are also defunct places of worship:

- Bethel Baptist Chapel opened in 1856. Now closed and demolished to make way for 4 houses.
- Bethesda Independent Chapel (opened 1860, disused by 2004). Now converted as a family home.
- Nazareth Calvinistic Methodist Chapel (opened 1860, closed 1965).

== Notable people ==
- Stuart Cable (1970–2010), the late former drummer of the Stereophonics and broadcaster lived in Abernant for a period.
- Elaine Morgan (1920–2013), lived with her husband and wrote in a bungalow called Noddfa near Little Row, Abernant.

== Gallery ==
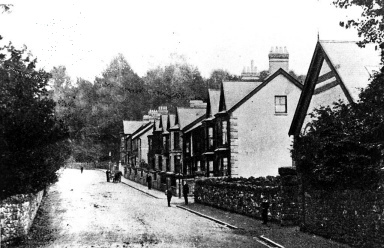
Abernant, c. 1900.

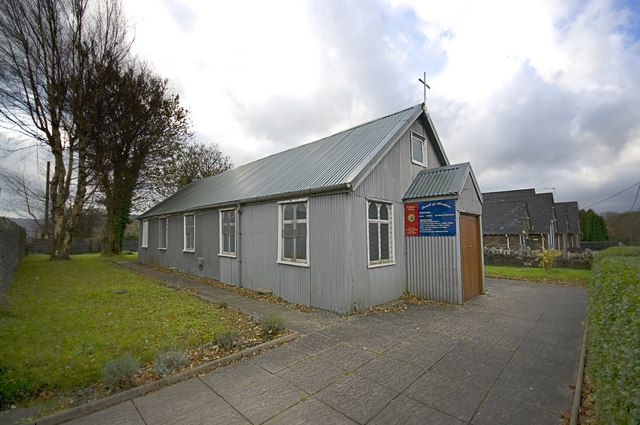
St Matthews Mission Church.

== Bibliography ==
- Jones, Ieuan Gwynedd (1964). "Dr. Thomas Price and the election of 1868 in Merthyr Tydfil : a study in nonconformist politics (Part One)" (PDF). Welsh History Review. 2 (2): 147–172.
