= Calfaria Chapel, Aberdare =

Former chapel in Rhondda Cynon Taf, Wales

Coordinates: 51.7119°N 3.4460°W

Calfaria, Aberdare
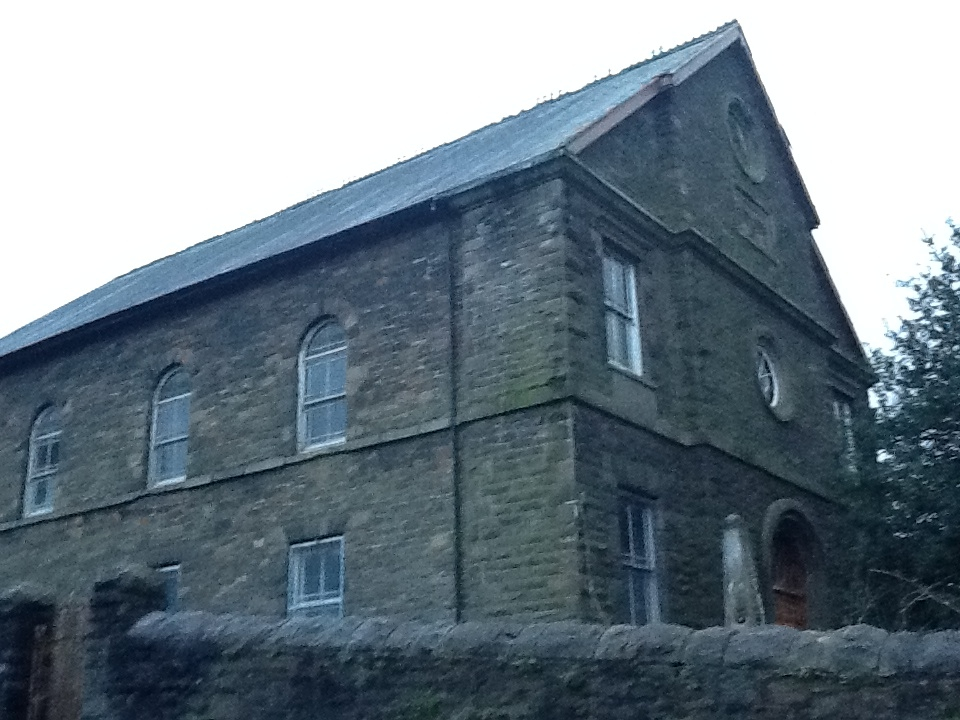
- Calfaria, Aberdare, now closed, in 2014
- Calfaria, Aberdare
- Location: Monk Street, Aberdare
- Country: Wales, United Kingdom
- Denomination: Baptist

History
- Founded: 1811

Architecture
- Heritage designation: Grade II
- Designated: 1 October 1991
- Architect: Thomas Joseph
- Architectural type: Chapel
- Style: Early 19th century
- Completed: 1852 (replacing earlier building)
- Construction cost: £1,400
- Closed: 2012

Specifications
- Capacity: 840

Calfaria Baptist Chapel, Aberdare, was one of the largest baptist churches in the South Wales Valleys and the oldest in the Aberdare valley. The chapel had an ornate interior, including a boarded ceiling with a deeply undercut rose, while the balcony balustrading had a cast iron front with an intricate foliage design. These features were common in the Welsh chapels of the late nineteenth century. The organ was installed in 1903 at a cost of £850. It was played for the last time in 2012 by Robert Nicholls, during a Radio Cymru broadcast shortly before the closure of the chapel.

== Early history ==
The earliest Baptist meetings in the area were held in agricultural buildings or in the Long Room of the Farmers Arms in Aberdare. In 1811, a small piece of land was leased from Griffith Davies of Ynysybwl and 1812, Carmel Baptist Church was opened. Known locally as Penpound, the first minister was William Lewis. The church struggled in the early days owing to the failure of the Aberdare Ironworks in 1815. Lewis's pastorate came to an end after only two years.

== Thomas Price at Calfaria ==
Thomas Price commenced his ministry in 1845. As the membership grew the building became too small so Carmel was handed over to a smaller English speaking congregation while a new chapel, Calfaria, was built nearby. The new chapel was designed by Thomas Joseph, a colliery engineer from Hirwaun, cost £1,400 to build and seated 840. The building was extended in 1859 and the adjacent Calfaria Hall built in 1871. The first service was held at Calfaria on 8 February 1852. By this time, Price had become a leading figure in public life, primarily as a result of his very public criticisms of the 1847 Education Reports and the evidence given to the commissioners by the vicar of Aberdare, the Rev John Griffith.

At one time in the nineteenth century, Calfaria had over a thousand members but many hundreds were transferred to branch chapels established at the instigation of Thomas Price. In 1855 the Heolyfelin Baptist Church was formed as a branch of the Hirwaun Baptist Church; and in 1856 91 members from Calfaria were transferred to form the English Baptist Church at Carmel, Aberdare. Bethel, Abernant, was opened in 1857. In 1849 121 members were transferred to form Gwawr, Aberaman; in 1855, 89 were released to start a cause at Mountain Ash, and in 1862, 163 were released to strengthen Bethel, Abernant; in the same year 131 were released to form a church in Ynyslwyd; in 1865 49 were transferred to form Gadlys Church. 927 altogether were released from Calfaria to form churches in various parts of the district. Price, however, ensured that the unity of the Baptist 'family' of churches was maintained by such activities as Baptismal services in the river Cynon and annual eisteddfodau. In 1913, a local resident recalled:

"I remember that once a month on Sunday afternoons, Dr. Price, the Baptist minister, used to baptise his recent converts in the Cynon River, alongside the iron bridge at the bottom of Commercial Street. I have seen as many as 25 or 30 converts, men and women, on the same afternoon. On these occasions the whole of the Baptist community used to meet at the chapel and march ii procession through the streets with the converts, the men converts being attired in long black robes and the women in white. They marched through the streets from the chapel to the place of baptism singing hymns. As a matter of course, large crowds gathered on the river banks to witness the immersions."

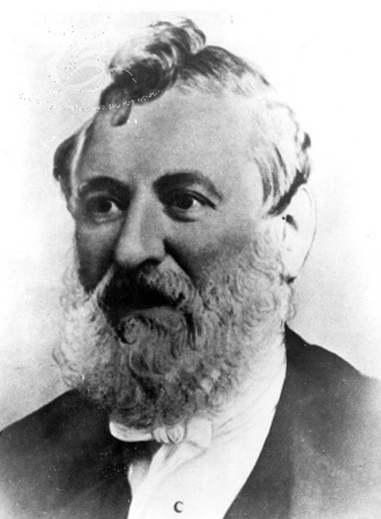
Rev Thomas Price

Calfaria retained its pre-eminence among the Baptist churches of the valley although Price's prestige was somewhat undermined by his failure to support Henry Richard at the 1868 General Election. In 1869, Price visited the United States for six months with his daughter Emily. His funeral in 1888 was one of the biggest seen in the valley.

== Pastorate of James Griffiths ==
Following Price's death, James Griffiths, minister of Calfaria, Llanelli received a unanimous call to become his successor at Calfaria. He was inducted as minister at special services held on Christmas Day 1888.

In 1898 the Welsh Baptist Union held its annual assembly at Calfaria, and in 1903 a new organ was purchased at a cost of £850.

Griffiths later wrote the church's centenary history in 1912. Membership stood at 537 in 1899 with a slight decline to 420 by 1916 and 396 in 1925.

In 1923, Griffiths was elected president of the Baptist Union of Wales. During his year as president, Calfaria embarked on a significant innovation by opening a recreation ground at the nearby Mardy Field, including two hard tennis courts, two bowling greens and a playing area for children. There was also a pavilion that could accommodate 150 people. The recreation ground was opened by W.M. Llewellyn, who held the ceremonial post of High Constable of Miskin. In his speech, Llewellyn implied that some member at Calfaria had reservations over the scheme, but he felt that having sport played under the supervision of a religious body brought numerous benefits. In a progressive age, Llewellyn declared, the success of the churches depended on their "offering of an incentive capable of attracting the people." Until the outbreak of the Second World War, the activities of the chapel included a lawn tennis team who competed against other teams from the locality.

In 1925 the membership stood at 395. The pastorate of James Griffiths came to an end in 1930 and he died three years later. He was buried at his native Blackmill, near Bridgend.

== 20th century and later ==
Griffiths was succeeded in 1932 by D. Herbert Davies, who served until 1947 when he moved to Penuel, Carmarthen.

Four years passed until a successor was found, an in 1951 Davies presided at an induction service for H.D. Thomas, previously minister of Hebron, Holyhead. He remained at Calfaria until 1961. Dennis Jenkins became minister in 1962. Membership had fallen to 168 by 1963.

In the 1970s, Alun Davies became minister at Calfaria, having previously served at Bethel, Abernant, Whitland, Birchgrove (Swansea) and Treharris. Alun Daies died on 22 December 1985 and his funeral was held at Calfaria eight days later. Among those who participated at his funeral was his lifelong friend, the poet Rhydwen Williams.

Like so many chapels, the difficulties continued with the decline of the Welsh language in the valley and by 2003 the membership had fallen to 19 with an average attendance of six at the evening service. After many years of decline, Calfaria eventually closed in 2012.

In August 2019 it was announced that retired Baptist minister Robert Stivey had bought the Calfaria building (as well as a number of other chapels) with a view of reopening as a community church.

== Sources ==
=== Books and Journals ===
- Davies, G. Henton (July 1968). "A Welsh Man of God" (PDF). Baptist Quarterly. XXII (7): 360–70. doi:10.1080/0005576X.1968.11751256.
- Jones, Ieuan Gwynedd (1964). "Dr. Thomas Price and the election of 1868 in Merthyr Tydfil : a study in nonconformist politics (Part One)" (PDF). Welsh History Review. 2 (2): 147–172.
- Jones, Alan Vernon (2004). Chapels of the Cynon Valley. Cynon Valley Historical Society. ISBN 0953107612.
- Parry, R. Ifor (1964). "Crefydd yng Nghwm Aberdar, a Chyfraniad y Bedyddwyr". Undeb Bedyddwyr Cymru, Aberdar (in Welsh): 15–61.
- Undeb Bedyddwyr Cymru, Y Rhos, Aberpennar (in Welsh). 1947.
- Undeb Bedyddwyr Cymru, Aberdâr (in Welsh). 1964.

=== Online ===
- Rammell, Thomas Webster (1853). "Report to the General Board of Health on a preliminary inquiry into the sewerage, drainage, and supply of water, and the sanitary condition of the inhabitants of the inhabitants of the parish of Aberdare in the county of Glamorgan". Internet Archive. General Board of Health.
