= Baptist Union of Wales =

Christian denomination

- Undeb Bedyddwyr Cymru
- Logo of the Baptist Union of Wales (Undeb Bedyddwyr Cymru).
- Classification: Nonconformist Protestantism
- Orientation: Evangelical
- Theology: Baptist
- Polity: Congregational
- Distinct fellowships: Baptist Union of Great Britain
- Associations: Baptist World Alliance, European Baptist Federation, Free Church Federation, Cytûn
- Region: Wales
- Headquarters: Carmarthen
- Origin: 1866
- Congregations: 315
- Members: 8,105
- Official website: http://www.buw.org.uk/

The Baptist Union of Wales, abbreviated BUW (Welsh: Undeb Bedyddwyr Cymru; UBC), is a Baptist denomination in Wales, United Kingdom. The Union is affiliated with the Baptist World Alliance, the European Baptist Federation, the Free Church Federation, the Churches Together in Wales. The Baptist Union of Wales' headquarters is located in Carmarthen, Carmarthenshire.

== History ==
=== Early Welsh Baptist ministers ===
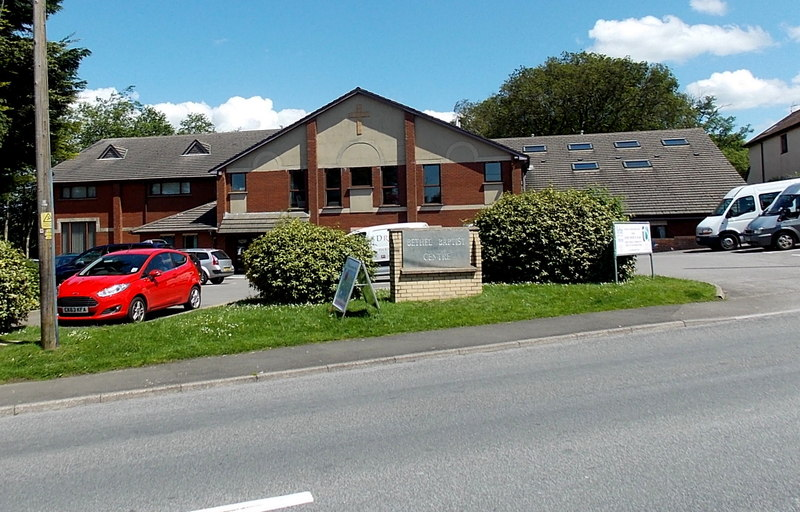
Bethel Baptist Church in Pontyclun.

The Puritan minister Hugh Evans was the first minister to preach Baptist doctrines in Wales, around 1646, in the parishes of Llan-hir, Cefnllys, Nantmel, and Llanddewi Ystradenny, as well as in districts across the upper Wye Valley in Brecknockshire. In 1649, John Myles and Thomas Proud were appointed ministers at Ilston parish, before emigrating to Swansea, Massachusetts in 1663. Myles and Proud were connected to the Particular Baptists in London. In 1650, three Baptist churches held the first Baptist General Assembly in Wales. A national body was organized in 1866.

== Membership ==
According to a census published by the association in 2023, it claimed 8,105 members and 315 churches.

== See also ==
- Nonconformism
- Religion in Wales
