= Elim Chapel, Cwmdare =

Former chapel in Cwmdare, Rhondda Cynon Taf, Wales

Coordinates: 51°43.0921′N 3°28.7625′W

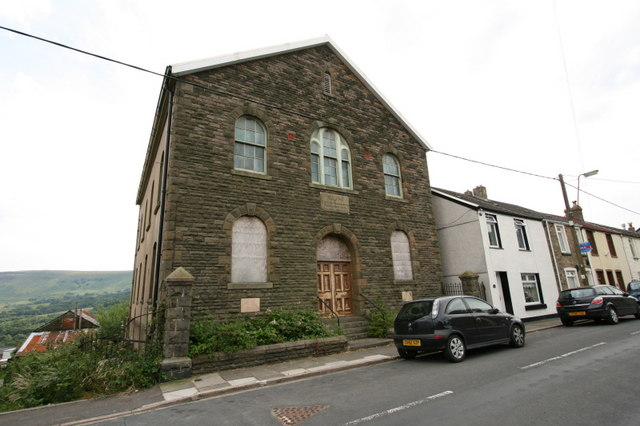
Elim Chapel in 2008

Elim, Cwmdare was an Independent (Congregationalist) chapel in Cwmdare, Aberdare, Wales.

== Early history ==
The church was established as a direct result of the Religious Revival of 1859, when fifty members were released from Ebenezer, Trecynon to establish a new church in the mining village of Cwmdare. Originally, meetings were held in a vestry but in August 1867 a new chapel was opened, when services were addressed by a number of ministers including David Price of Siloa, Aberdare. £200 was raised towards the cost which was recognised as a significant achievement given that all members of the church were workmen. The mother church at Ebenezer was also recognised as giving significant support to Elim.

The first minister was Abraham Matthews, who came from Bala College to minister at Elim together with Horeb, Llwydcoed.

David Griffiths, a student from Brecon College, was inaugurated as minister at Elim in June 1869. He was a native of Llanarth, Cardiganshire and had migrated to Dowlais when around twenty years of age having previously worked as a farm labourer. Griffiths was urged to commence preaching by the minister at Bethania, Dowlais. Griffiths served for a time as a member of the Aberdare School Board. He remained at Elim until his death.

== Twentieth Century ==
In 1903, the chapel was rebuilt. A memorial stone was laid on 11 August 1902 by Rees Llewellyn of Bwllfa House, Cwmdare and J.W. Evans of Hirwaun.

In February 1906, David Griffiths died at the age of 65 having spent 37 years as minister of Elim.

David Owen Davies was minister from 1961 until his retirement in 1981. He died in 1989. The chapel eventually closed in 1998.

== Bibliography ==
- Jones, Alan Vernon (2004). Chapels of the Cynon Valley. Cynon Valley Historical Society. ISBN 0953107612.
