= Saron Chapel, Aberaman =

Chapel in Rhondda Cynon Taf, Wales

Coordinates: 51.7036°N 3.4303°W

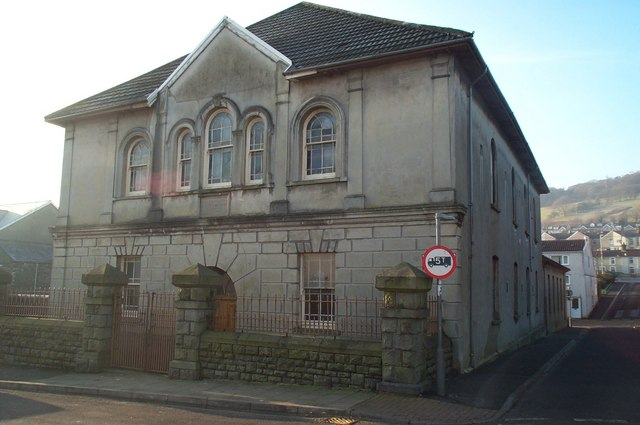
Saron chapel, Aberaman in 2008

Saron was a Welsh Independent (Congregationalist) chapel in Davies Street, Aberaman, Wales, formed as an initiative of the David Price of Siloa, Aberdare, soon after the development of Aberaman as an industrial settlement as a result of the activities of Crawshay Bailey and David Davis, Blaengwawr. Saron was claimed to be the largest chapel in the Cynon Valley although Calvaria, Abercynon, Ebenezer, Trecynon and Siloa, Aberdare all had a similar capacity.

== Foundation and early history ==
The history of the cause at Saron can be traced to meetings held from November 1846 at a house in Cardiff Road, Aberaman, where Thomas Jones, minister of Adulam, Merthyr Tydfil had come to live and keep a school. At this time, the village of Aberaman was at a very early stage in its development as an industrial centre and, as workers frequently migrated in and out of the area the membership of the nascent church fluctuated. Soon, however the house became too small and the congregation moved to the nearby Lamb and Flag. The premises were owned by one Thomas Howells, but the holding of meetings in a public house, although far from unusual in those days, led to a split among the members and the meetings reverted to the house of Thomas Jones. When he died in January 1848 the future of the church was uncertain.

However, at this stage, the intervention of David Price, minister of Siloa, Aberdare was crucial in the formation of a permanent Independent church at Aberaman, which was inaugurated later in 1848. In 1849, Joshua Thomas of Bethlehem, Llangadog, accepted a call to minister the church and in that year, in the wake of a religious revival which coincided with a cholera outbreak in the Glamorgan and Monmouthshire valleys, around 120 new members were accepted at Saron. A new building was urgently required and, shortly afterwards land was leased at Abergwawr Farm from Dr James Lewis Roberts and Jennett Roberts and a chapel built which was consecrated in 1850. The building costs in 1849–50 were £719. At this time there were 218 members at Saron.

== The Pastorate of John Davies, 1854–63 ==
Once the cholera outbreak was over the membership at Saron declined as many of those who had sought religious solace when in fear of the disease now withdrew. In this atmosphere remaining members fell out amongst themselves, a number left for other churches and, ultimately, in August 1852, Joshua Thomas terminated his ministry at Saron. William Edwards, minister of Ebenezer, Trecynon, temporarily took on responsibility for Saron until a call was extended to the Rev John Davies of Llanelli, Breconshire, in June 1854. After some months' hesitation, Davies accepted and commenced his ministry in November of that year.

The arrival of the new minister immediately revived the cause at Saron. Although a branch of Saron was opened at Moriah Aman, Cwmaman, leading to the transfer of 29 members the existing building was found to be too small and a decision was taken to extend the building. This took place in 1856 at a cost of £220 to provide seating capacity for 900 people. This work cost £953, and the church debt was £1200, as the cost of building the original chapel had not been cleared. However, the debt was rapidly reduced, and in the early 1860s, the spacious Saron Hall was built behind the chapel at a cost of £300, and by 1865 the debt was largely cleared.

It was no small feat for an industrial community composed in the main of manual labourers to raise over £2000 in little over fifteen years. Saron did benefit, however, from the religious revival of 1859–60, when some 50 new members were being admitted each month. During this time, members of Saron had a part to play in the formation of the Tabernacle English Congregational Church, Aberdare

John Davies had been a success at Aberaman and, in June 1863, he received a call from the church at Mount Stuart Square, Cardiff, and he ended his ministry at Saron on 14 June 1863.

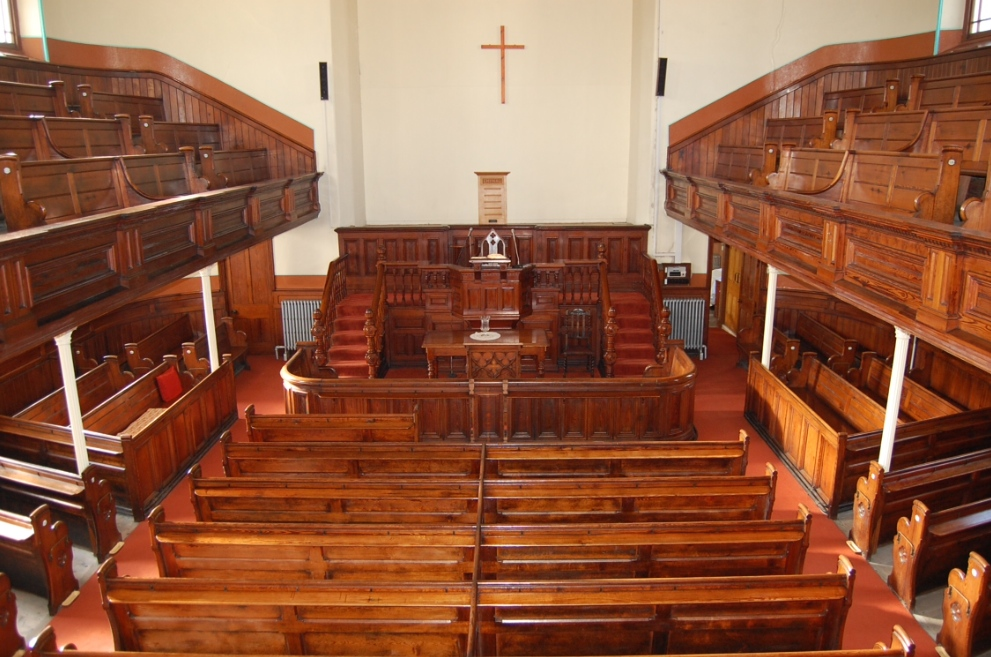
Interior of Saron, Aberaman

== Later Nineteenth Century ==
A further renovation took place in 1890 at a cost of £1,600.

R. Rowlands was minister from 1864 until 1891 and H.P. Jenkins from 1893 until 1922.

== Later history ==
The longest serving minister at Saron was Glannant Jones who served for 42 years from 1931 until 1973. Heulwen Evans ALCM was the organist from 1960 until 2000.

The chapel was well-maintained into the twenty-first century but eventually closed due to a dwindling congregation. It was later reopened as Saron Chapel, Independent Baptist Church. The first service was November 5, 2014 under the new pastor, an American missionary, Dr. B.J. Stagner Jr. The church was renamed to Calvary Independent Baptist Church Cynon Valley in 2022.

== Bibliography ==
- Jones, Alan Vernon (2004). Chapels of the Cynon Valley. Cynon Valley Historical Society. ISBN 0953107612.
- Rees, D. Ben (1975). Chapels in the Valley. The Ffynnon Press. ISBN 0-902158-08-2.
- Rees, Thomas; Thomas, John (1871). Hanes Eglwysi Annibynnol Cymru, Vol. 2.
