= Nonconformity in Wales =

Non-Anglican protestant Christianity in Wales

Nonconformity was a major religious movement in Wales from the 18th to the 20th centuries. The Welsh Methodist revival of the 18th century was one of the most significant religious and social movements in the modern history of Wales. The revival began within the Church of England in Wales, partly as a reaction to the neglect generally felt in Wales at the hands of absentee bishops and clergy. For two generations from the 1730s onwards the main Methodist leaders such as Howell Harris, Daniel Rowland and William Williams Pantycelyn remained within the Church of England, but the Welsh revival differed from the Methodist revival in England in that its theology was Calvinist rather than Arminian. Methodists in Wales gradually built up their own networks, structures, and meeting houses (or chapels), which led, at the instigation of Thomas Charles, to the secession of 1811 and the formal establishment of the Calvinistic Methodist denomination in 1823 (which assumed as an alternative title the name Presbyterian Church of Wales in 1928).

The 18th-century revival also influenced the older nonconformist churches, or dissenters – the Baptists and the Congregationalists – who in turn also experienced growth and renewal. As a result, by the middle of the 19th century, Wales was predominantly a nonconformist country.

== 19th century ==
Starting in rural areas and small market towns, the 19th century was the golden age of Welsh nonconformity. Some small settlements, such as Carmel, Nebo and Sardis, grew around a chapel or meeting house and were named after it. Some of these settlements, such as Bethesda, Gwynedd, became large settlements.

In the era of rapid industrialisation after the Napoleonic Wars, nonconformity became firmly established in the new industrial settlements of South Wales as migrants from the rural counties brought their religious affiliations with them. In places such as Merthyr Tydfil, Aberdare, Llanelli and Neath, Nonconformity grew alongside industry and by the 1880s these towns were regarded as "citadels of dissent", with their ministers and deacons having a powerful role among a new middle class elite which dominated public life. The ministers also had considerable influence within working class networks which, in part, reflected their own social origins. The Religious Census of 1851 showed that 80% of those who attended a place of worship on Census Sunday in Wales were Nonconformists, even though the large proportion of the population, even in Wales, who were not recorded in the census, suggested that the influence of religion within society was far more tenuous than first appearances suggested.

In 1859 there was another popular revival, which began in north Cardiganshire and eventually affected most of Wales. It was primarily, however, a Welsh language phenomenon, and its influence was, in the main, a transient one.

Nevertheless, by the 1880s, Nonconformity was approaching its golden age. Chapel buildings were increasingly grandiose, in contrast to the austerity of the earlier meeting houses of the revivalist period. Professional architects were engaged to design elaborate structures, especially in larger towns such as Aberystwyth, Caernarfon, Carmarthen and Swansea, as well as in the developing townships of the industrial valleys.

== Nonconformist denominations in Wales ==
In the nineteenth century, Welsh nonconformity, within which the Calvinistic Methodists were the largest denomination, was strongly connected to the Welsh language, though not exclusively so. Anglicanism, in turn, was often associated with the English language and landed gentry. The growth in Welsh political radicalism in the 19th century was closely tied to the surge of Nonconformism. The wealthier and more established farm owners and the middle class spoke English. But the rapid industrializing and growth of coal and iron brought many poor farmers out of agriculture into much better paying industrial jobs, thus providing a better financial base for the Nonconformists.

By the 1880s, over 350,000 men and women were officially members of one of the four main Nonconformist denominations, and there were also larger numbers of "adherents" who attended services and other chapel-based activities but were not officially recorded as members. While there were some differences between the denominations, such as the Baptists' insistence on total immersion, these were less significant by the later 19th century than previously. In political terms, especially after the more conservative Calvinistic Methodists became more involved in political activity in the wake of the 1847 Reports of the Commissioners of Inquiry into the State of Education in Wales and the 1868 General Election, the chapels spoke largely as one in their opposition to the social and political dominance of the clergy and landed gentry, particularly in rural areas. The relative absence of these influences in the industrial valleys made Nonconformity even more powerful, especially given that many of the leading coal owners of the late 19th century were Welsh-speaking Nonconformists. It has been said that the chapels "formed almost a kind of unofficial established religion".

=== Calvinistic Methodists ===
The Calvinistic Methodists were the largest of the denominations in numerical terms. Their greatest strength was in rural Wales, notably Anglesey, Caernarfonshire, Merionethshire and Ceredigion.

=== Independents ===
The Congregationalists, usually referred to as the Independents in the Welsh context, were especially strong in south Wales, notably in Carmarthenshire and Glamorgan.

=== Baptists ===
Baptist strength was more concentrated, primarily in Glamorgan and Carmarthenshire, but also in Pembrokeshire on both sides of the linguistic divide.

=== Wesleyans ===
The Wesleyans were not particularly strong in Wales and were more anglicised.

=== Other denominations ===
Unitarians flourished in the Teifi Valley in West Wales and also in small pockets in Glamorgan, such as Aberdare. There were small Quaker congregations in Cardiff and Swansea.

== 1904–1905 Welsh Revival ==
The 1904–1905 Welsh Revival was the last revival in Wales and was again essentially a Nonconformist and Welsh-language phenomenon. It is believed that at least 100,000 were involved in the 1904–1905 revival, but historians generally regard it as the last great outpouring of a nonconformist movement that then went into gradual decline, a process exacerbated by the First World War.

== Nonconformity and Welsh society ==
Historians have debated the influence of Nonconformity upon Welsh society. From one perspective there was an inherently conservative aspect to Welsh Nonconformity in particular. Sabbatarianism was taken to extremes, with the Sunday Closing (Wales) Act 1881 as its high water mark. The influence of this Act persisted in some parts of Wales until the very late 20th century, with public houses in some counties staying closed on Sundays. This reflected a close interaction between Nonconformity and temperance movements such as the Good Templars, and "taking the pledge" to abstain from alcohol became a formative part of chapel culture.

To some, such as the writer Caradoc Evans, Welsh Nonconformity was imbued with hypocrisy and double standards, especially as the increasingly respectable ethos of a middle class composed of professionals, shopkeepers and "respectable" working men dominated the leadership of the chapels. Women were very largely sidelined and denied any positions of responsibility, even though they comprised the majority of the congregations. Denominationalism, based on rivalries between neighbouring chapels, was often rampant and could be seen at its worst in local elections to bodies such as School Boards. There were even divisions within denominations, and many of the numerous chapels built in the generation before the First World War resulted from a schism in the mother church.

But in other ways Nonconformity could be seen as having a positive impact. It was from the chapels that the great wave of popular political engagement in Wales erupted from the 1860s onwards, and nonconformist ministers played an important role in the success of the Liberal Party in Wales. The chapels also became the mainstay of various community activities, such as choral festivals and eisteddfodau, though some of these traditions predated the ascendency of Nonconformity. Nonconformity was also central to various developments in education, from the post-1870 Board Schools, which in Wales were largely influenced by the chapels, to the first Welsh university established at Aberystwyth in 1872.

== Nonconformist ministers ==
The influence of nonconformist ministers on Welsh society was significant. There were many hundreds of ministers in Wales by the late 19th century, and many of them came from an unprivileged background. For example, Thomas Price of Calfaria, Aberdare, began life as a domestic servant, while his contemporary David Price of Siloa, Aberdare, worked as a miner. Their style was essentially populist, and they enjoyed a spontaneous relationship with their congregations, not only in delivering fiery and often fundamentalist sermons on Sundays but also in popular lectures on figures such as Oliver Cromwell and Garibaldi. They also had a profound influence on the Welsh-language press, not only through their own denominational journals but also more widely.

== See also ==
- Welsh Church Act 1914, the Disestablishment of the Church in Wales
