= Bethania Chapel, Cwmbach =

Former chapel in Cwmbach, Rhondda Cynon Taf, Wales

Bethania, Cwmbach
- Bethania, Cwmbach
- 51.7051°N 3.4150°W
- Denomination: Baptist

History
- Status: Closed
- Founded: 1845

Architecture
- Years built: 1858
- Construction cost: £1,100
- Closed: 1980
- Demolished: 1995

Bethania, Cwmbach was a Baptist Chapel at Cwmbach in the Aberdare Valley in Wales. Badly damaged by an air raid attack in 1941 it was subsequently restored but closed in the 1980s. Services were held in the Welsh language.

== Foundation and early history ==
A chapel was registered at Cwmbach in April 1841, and the Rev. William Lewis of Carmel Penpound (which preceded Calfaria, Aberdare, was one of the signatories. The earliest services were held at a building known as 'The Square' at Abernant-y-Groes. In 1964, according to Ifor Parry, the date 1841 was still visible on the original building. One of the Baptist pioneers at Cwmbach was William Thomas David of Abernant-y-groes Uchaf, who owned the land where the first deep mine in the Aberdare Valley to produce sale coal was opened in 1837. Hitherto, all the coal produced in the locality had been for use in the ironworks.

The church was incorporated on 14 and 15 January 1845. Morgan Lewis was the first minister from 1845. The Education Reports of 1847 state that his annual stipend was £40 per annum and that he sustained himself by keeping a day school. Morgan Lewis he died of cholera in 1849.

J.D. Williams was inaugurated as the second minister in 1851 and also ran a day school. Williams left in 1855. T.E. Jones was then inaugurated as minister in the same year but his tenure was also brief and he departed to Glyn-neath in 1858.

A new chapel was built in 1858 by William Lewis. The former building was subsequently sold to the Unitarians. The next minister was William Harris from 1859, but in 1862 he moved to the nearby church at Heolyfelin. (Note: Harris remained at Heolyfelin for forty years and served as President of the Welsh Baptist Union in 1891/2)

A vestry was added in 1865. In that year, Walter Samuel became minister and remained until his departure to Liverpool in 1878. From 1878 until 1887 the church was overseen by a lay minister, Robert James. David Thomas, a native of Letterston in Pembrokeshire who had recently completed his studies at Pontypool College, was ordained as minister on 1 and 2 January 1888 and remained until his early death in January 1902. During his time at Cwmbach, David Thomas served as a member of the Aberdare School Board.

== Twentieth century ==
In 1903, the Rev. Joseph James was inaugurated as minister. He remained for nearly 25 years before his departure to Amlwch in 1927.

Membership peaked following the 1904-05 Religious Revival. There were 469 members in 1906 but this fell to 273 by 1932.

G.J. Morgan, a student from Carmarthen College, was ordained as minister of Bethania in 1930. He departed for Australia in 1937.

== Wartime damage ==
On 30 May 1941 the chapel was badly damaged by enemy war action and the adjoining vestry completely destroyed.

Nevertheless, the chapel celebrated its centenary in 1944 and services were held at the schoolroom at Ynyscynon which had been built during the ministry of Joseph James.

The chapel was eventually restored in 1950/51 and re-opened on 14 April 1951.

== Later history ==
Idris Williams, who came from Calfaria, Penygroes, was minister from 1946 until 1956. He was succeeded by D.W. Thomas from 1961.

By 1978 there were only fifteen members and the chapel closed around 1980. The building was demolished in 1995.

== Bibliography ==
- Jones, Alan Vernon (2004). Chapels of the Cynon Valley. Cynon Valley Historical Society. ISBN 0953107612.
- Jones, Ieuan Gwynedd (1964). "Dr. Thomas Price and the election of 1868 in Merthyr Tydfil : a study in nonconformist politics (Part One)" (PDF). Welsh History Review. 2 (2): 147–172.
- Parry, R. Ifor (1964). "Crefydd yng Nghwm Aberdar, a Chyfraniad y Bedyddwyr". Undeb Bedyddwyr Cymru, Aberdar (in Welsh): 15–61.
- Undeb Bedyddwyr Cymru, Y Rhos, Aberpennar (in Welsh). 1947.
- Undeb Bedyddwyr Cymru, Aberdâr (in Welsh). 1964.
