= Tabernacle Chapel, Aberdare =

Former chapel in Aberdare, Rhondda Cynon Taf, Wales

Coordinates: 51.712687°N 3.441875°W

Tabernacle, Aberdare was a Congregationalist chapel in Station Street, Aberdare, Wales. Services at Tabernacle were held in the English language.

== Early history ==
The origins of the church at Tabernacle can be traced back to 1841 when services were held in the Long Room of the New Inn, Aberdare. Members from both Siloa, Aberdare and Saron, Aberaman were involved in the formation of Tabernacle. The main aim was to provide English language services for this migrants unable to speak or understand Welsh, which was the language of worship at almost all the nonconformist chapels in the locality. The first chapel was built in 1856, designed by B. Owen of Merthyr Tydfil and built at a cost of £823. It had seating for 450 people. The foundation stone was laid on 7 March 1856 by the Hon. Mrs Thompson, Chepstow. In 1857, Tabernacle had 156 members with 136 in the Sunday School.

Within three years the building was too small. A new building was therefore built, at a cost of £800. It was designed by W.S. Rampling and built by W. Rees. The chapel was of a primarily Gothic designs, like many English Congregationalist chapels in the Aberdare Valley. The design was said to have been decided by the landowner the Marquis of Bute.

The first minister was John Cunnick from 1857 until 1860. Membership was never large and peaked at around 200 in 1923.

== Twentieth Century ==
In 1915, T. Madoc Jeffreys was inducted as minister of Tabernacle. Jeffreys became a prominent figure in the locality and a member of Glamorgan County Council at the 1919 election.

In chapel closed in 1970 and its furnishings distributed among other chapels in the locality. The site was later occupied by Tesco and Wilkinsons stores.

== Bibliography ==
- Jones, Alan Vernon (2004). Chapels of the Cynon Valley. Cynon Valley Historical Society. ISBN 0953107612.
