= Siloh Chapel, Trecynon =

Former chapel in Aberdare, Rhondda Cynon Taf, Wales

Coordinates: 51.7195732°N 3.45529°W

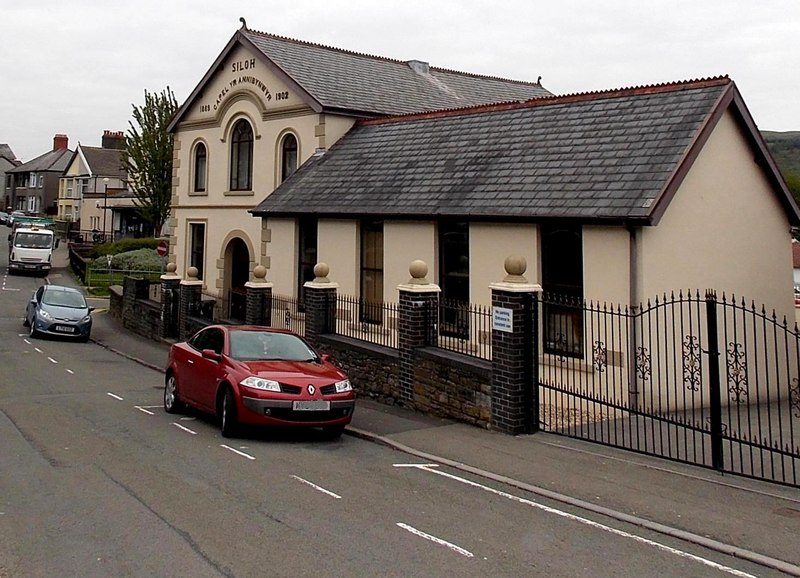
Exterior of Shiloh Chapel

Siloh, Trecynon was an Independent (Congregationalist) chapel in Mount Pleasant, Trecynon, Aberdare, Wales.

== Early history ==
Silo was formed in 1887 when Rev. David Onllwyn Brace and around fifty members broke away from Bethel, Gadlys. Meetings were initially held at the Swan Coffee Tavern and at the home of one Richard Wigley. As membership increased the congregation moved to the Park School. The original chapel was opened in April 1890 when the Revs. J. Rees, Treherbert; A. T. Jenkins, Ferndale; and W. G. Williams, Penarth, preached at special services over two days.

A new chapel was built in 1902, designed by Thomas Roderick. A gallery was added two years later.

The membership was never as large as that of some other churches in the locality. Membership stood at 154 in 1905 and 138 in 1930.

== The pastorate of J. Sulgwyn Davies 1891–1934 ==
Sulgwyn Davies was minister for 43 years. He died in 1939.

== 20th century ==
Members from Carmel worshipped at Siloh following the closure of their chapel in 1988. Siloh itself closed in 1996.

== Bibliography ==
- Jones, Alan Vernon (2004). Chapels of the Cynon Valley. Cynon Valley Historical Society. ISBN 0953107612.
