= Aberaman Hall and Institute =

Coordinates: 51.7027°N 3.4282°W

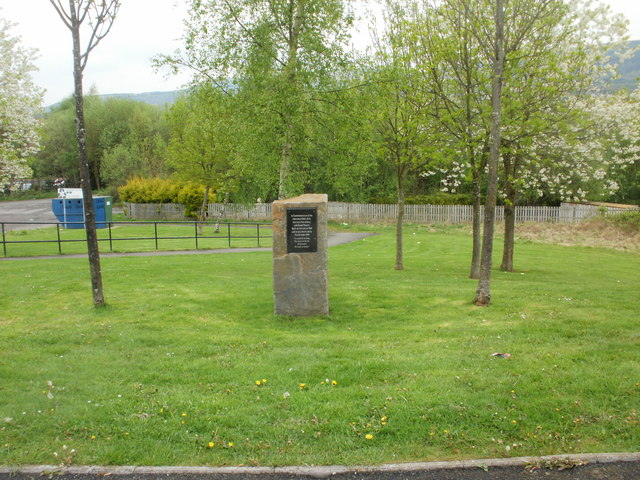
The site of Aberaman Public Hall

Aberaman Hall and Institute was a notable venue for entertainment and popular culture in the mining village of Aberaman, near Aberdare in South Wales. The hall was built in the first decade of the twentieth century, largely through the efforts of local miners, and continued to play a central role in the life of the valley until destroyed by fire in November 1994.

A campaign to develop a Public Hall and Institute at Aberaman dated from 1892 when a public meeting was held in Saron Chapel. Until that point the chapels had been dominant in public life and the development of a secular hall, in hindsight, could be seen as the beginning of their long decline. Many years elapsed before sufficient funds were raised to begin the building work and the ceremony to lay the foundation stone was held on 2 October 1907, on the site previously occupied by the Aberaman Reading Institute. The hall was officially opened by Keir Hardie MP on 14 June 1909.

The opening ceremony was a notable event in the history of Aberaman. A carriage arrived carrying D. A. Thomas the Liberal MP for Merthyr Boroughs, Keir Hardie, the Labour MP, William Thomas, High Constable of Aberdare and C. B. Stanton, the miners' agent. At the Institute, the architect, Thomas Roderick, handed Hardie a gold key, suitably inscribed, with which he opened the door of the building.

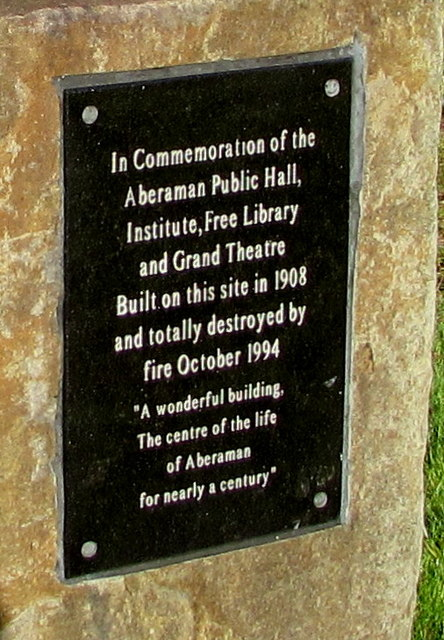
The commemoration plaque

Designed by Thomas Roderick, and built by John Morgan and Son, the hall's facilities, included two billiards rooms, two games rooms, a swimming pool in the basement, Committee Room, a Lending Library and Reference Room, and a Lecture Hall. Its crowning glory was the main auditorium with seating for 1,800 people with a first floor offering additional capacity.

Throughout the twentieth century the hall was the social and cultural centre for Aberaman. It was eventually destroyed by fire in November 1994.
