= Salem Chapel, Robertstown =

Chapel in Aberdare, Rhondda Cynon Taf, Wales

Coordinates: 51.721388°N 3.447339°W

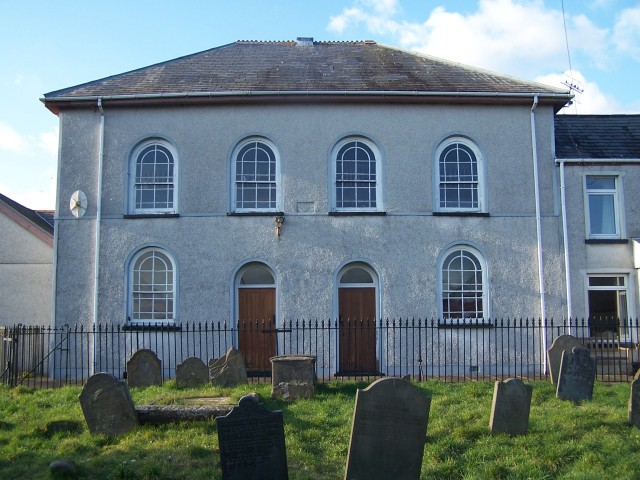
Salem, Robertstown in 2008

Salem, Robertstown is an Independent (Congregationalist) chapel in Bridge Street, Robertstown, Aberdare, Wales.

== Early history ==
The history of Salem can be traced back to 1835, when Joseph Harrison, minister of Ebenezer, Trecynon, broke away from that church because he was prepared to administer baptism by total immersion to those who wished. This was contrary to the beliefs of independent church members. Meetings were initially held in houses and later in the long room of the White Lion Inn. Although this was disapproved of by several members who were teetotal, it was far from unusual for the chapels of the valley to have their early origins in meetings in public houses.

This difficulty was initially addressed by building a wooden hut in 1836, which was known as Ty Planca. Soon it became too small, and the congregation proceeded to build Salem in 1841, for £550, and on land leased from Dr James Lewis Roberts. Joseph Harrison was minister until he died in 1851.

== The Ministry of Joshua Thomas ==
Harrison was succeeded by Joshua Thomas. He served as minister for many years and was presented with a testimonium of £140 in April 1875. The gift was presented by John Harrison, the oldest deacon and son of the founder of the chapel. Speakers on this occasion included Michael D. Jones of Bala, Thomas Rees of Swansea and local ministers William Edwards of Ebenezer, Trecynon and William Williams of Nebo, Hirwaun.

During this period, members from Salem established Bethel, Gadlys.

Membership reached 65 in 1841, but by the following year had fallen to 25.

Salem remained open until the twenty-first century.

== Bibliography ==
- Jones, Alan Vernon (2004). Chapels of the Cynon Valley. Cynon Valley Historical Society. ISBN 0953107612.
- Rees, Thomas; Thomas, John (1871). Hanes Eglwysi Annibynnol Cymru, Vol.2.
