= The Old Manor =

The Old Manor may refer to:

- The Old Manor, Norbury, Ashbourne, Derbyshire, England
- The Old Manor, Croscombe, Somerset, England
- The Old Manor (painting), a 1901 painting by Helene Schjerfbeck
- Old Manor, Saham Toney, Norfolk, England
- Old Manor Farm, Marple, Stockport, historically in Cheshire, now within Greater Manchester, England
