= Christopher Pickering (disambiguation) =

Christopher Pickering was a British ship owner and philanthropist

Christopher Pickering may also refer to:

- Christopher Pickering (MP) (c. 1556–1621), MP for Cumberland
- Chris Pickering, musician
