= Soar Chapel =

Soar Chapel may refer to the following churches in Wales:

- Soar Chapel, Cwmaman, a Calvinistic Methodist chapel in Rhondda Cynon Taf
- Soar Chapel, Hirwaun, a Wesleyan Methodist chapel in Aberdare, Glamorgan
- Soar Chapel, Llanelli, an Independent (Congregationalist) chapel in Carmarthenshire
- Soar Chapel, Llwydcoed, a Baptist chapel in Aberdare, Glamorgan
