= Bryncarnau Grasslands, Llwydcoed =

Protected area in Glamorgan, Wales

- Site of Special Scientific Interest
- Location within Wales
- Location of Bryncarnau Grasslands, Llwydcoed.
- Area of search: Wales
- Grid reference: SN9983306502
- Coordinates: 51.74823°N 3.4523542°W
- Interest: Biological
- Area: 25.02 ha (61.8 acres)
- Notification date: 24 August 1993

Bryncarnau Grasslands, Llwydcoed is a Site of Special Scientific Interest in Llwydcoed near Aberdare, south Wales.

== See also ==
- List of Sites of Special Scientific Interest in Mid & South Glamorgan
