= Moriah Aman Chapel =

Former chapel in Cwmaman, Rhondda Cynon Taf, Wales

Coordinates: 51.6870°N 3.4408°W

Moriah Aman, Cwmaman was a Welsh Independent (Congregationalist) chapel in Fforchaman Road, Cwmaman, Rhondda Cynon Taf, Wales.

== Foundation and early history ==
The cause at Moriah Aman was established in 1853 on the initiative of the Rev. John Davies, minister of Saron, Aberaman. It was originally a Sunday School with prayer meetings being held later in local houses. The first chapel was opened on 2 October 1855 with 27 members being transferred from the mother church at Saron.

== Later history ==
A new chapel opened in 1893 had seating for 650 people with the gallery accommodating 250. Membership was 435 in 1905.

In 1908, the members of Moriah Aman supported the actions of the church at Bethlehem, Abercwmboi in expelling members who supported the New Theology ideas of R.J. Campbell.

Moriah Aman eventually closed in 1988. In 1995 the building was refurbished as a Pentecostal church.

== Bibliography ==
- Jones, Alan Vernon (2004). Chapels of the Cynon Valley. Cynon Valley Historical Society. ISBN 0953107612.
- Rees, D. Ben (1975). Chapels in the Valley. The Ffynnon Press. ISBN 0-902158-08-2.
- Rees, Thomas; Thomas, John (1871). Hanes Eglwysi Annibynnol Cymru, Vol. 2.
