= Hugh Hughes (Tegai) =

Welsh poet and grammarian

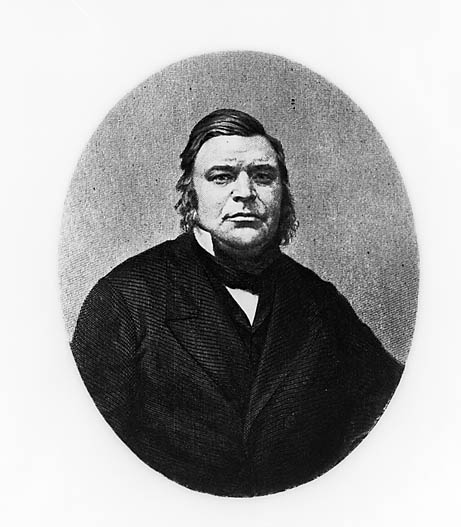
- Born: 1805; Cilgeraint, Llandygai, Carnarvonshire, Wales
- Died: 8 December 1864
- Occupations: Minister, poet
- Spouse: Jane Parry (m. 1827)
- Children: 5

Hugh Hughes (Tegai) (1805 – 8 December 1864) was a Welsh minister and poet.

== Life ==
Hughes was born in the small village of Cilgeraint, Llandygai, Carnarvonshire; his father was a deacon of the Independent church at Cororion, and district president of the British and Foreign Bible Society. He was educated at a Sunday school. When the Independent church to which his family belonged was closed, he joined the Wesleyans, but subsequently returned to the Independents, and became known in the district as a preacher.

Successively, Hughes took charge of churches at Rhos-y-lan, Tabor, and Llanystumdwy, at Jackson Street, Manchester, and at Capelhelyg, Chwilog, and Abererch in Carnarvonshire. At Abererch he set up a printing–press, and edited Yr Arweinydd, a penny monthly, for many years. In 1859 he moved to Aberdare, where he took charge of the new church at Bethel, and gathered a large congregation.

Hughes died on 8 December 1864. He was Arminian rather than Calvinistic; in church organisation he was a Congregationalist. He lost money on his publications, and a public subscription was raised for him by friends during the last year of his life, though he died before the testimonial was presented. In early life he competed frequently and successfully at eisteddfodau, and later often acted as an adjudicator.

== Works ==
Hughes was a prolific writer, and contributed largely to magazines. His major works were:

- Rhesymeg (logic), Wrexham, 1856.
- Y Drydedd Oruchwyliaeth (The Third Dispensation), Pontyprydd, 1859.
- Grammadeg Barddoniaeth, Carnarvon, 1862.
- Ioan yn Ynys Patmos (Awdl)—an ode on St. John in the Isle of Patmos, Aberdare, 1864.
- Grammadeg Athronyddol, stereotyped after 4th ed.
- Yr Ysgrifell Gymreig, three editions, Wrexham.
- Crynodeb o Rammadeg Cymraeg, introduction to Welsh Grammar, Carnarvon.
- Catechism of Welsh Grammar, Carnarvon.
- Agoriad Gwybodaeth, on composition.
- Review of Cole, and an Essay on Divine Government, Carnarvon, supplies an account of his religious views.
- Bwrdd y Bardd, the first published collection of his poetical works.
- Essay on Independency.
- Olyniaeth Apostolaidd.
- Moses and Colenso.
- Cydwybod.
- Bedydd Cristeinogol.
- Deddf, Pechod, a Gras.
- Ydrydedd Oruchwyliaeth.
- Cofiant J.Jones, Talsarn.
- Casgliad o Emynau.
- Telyn y Saint.

== Family ==
Hughes married in 1827 Jane Parry of Llandygai. They had five children.

== Notes and references ==
Attribution

This article incorporates text from a publication now in the public domain: Lee, Sidney, ed. (1891). "Hughes, Hugh (1805-1864)". Dictionary of National Biography. Vol. 28. London: Smith, Elder & Co.
