= Soar Chapel, Cwmaman =

Former chapel in Cwmaman, Rhondda Cynon Taf, Wales

Coordinates: 51.6862°N 3.4414°W

Soar, Cwmaman was a Welsh Calvinistic Methodist chapel in Fforchaman Road, Cwmaman, Rhondda Cynon Taf, Wales.

== Foundation and early history ==
The cause was formed during the Religious Revival of 1859 which was led by Dafydd Morgan. A branch of Libanus, Aberaman, early meetings were held at the home of Thomas Anthony, an engineer at the Shepherd's Pit in the village. However, in 1868 the first building collapsed due to its being located directly above a coal level owned by one David Bevan. The chapel was rebuilt the following year.

In 1878, the first Cwmaman village Eisteddfod was held at Soar.

== Later history ==
Rebuilt again in 1895 at a cost of £3,070, the new chapel had seating for 650 people. The memorial stone was laid by D.A. Thomas MP. The first two ministers were the Rev W. Tefilan Griffiths and the Rev Williams Davies. W.D. Morris was minister for forty years from 1886 until 1926 and during this period the membership reached 350 in 1912.

Soar eventually closed in 1992 and the building was demolished in 1998.

== Bibliography ==
- Jones, Alan Vernon (2004). Chapels of the Cynon Valley. Cynon Valley Historical Society. ISBN 0953107612.
- Rees, D. Ben (1975). Chapels in the Valley. The Ffynnon Press. ISBN 0-902158-08-2.
- Rees, Thomas; Thomas, John (1871). Hanes Eglwysi Annibynnol Cymru, Vol. 2.
