= Nebo Chapel, Hirwaun =

Former chapel in Aberdare, Rhondda Cynon Taf, Wales

Coordinates: 51.738661°N 3.509106°W

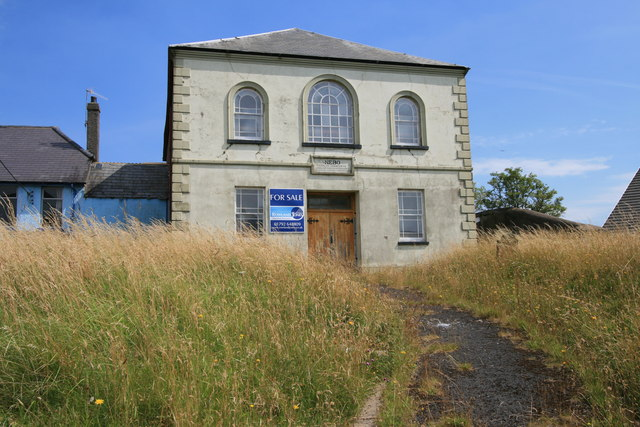

Nebo, Hirwaun was an Independent (Congregationalist) chapel in Merthyr Road, Hirwaun, Aberdare, Wales.

== Early history ==
Nebo was established in the early 19th century, when the Hirwaun ironworks were in operation At that time a number of members of the Independents, the Calvinistic Methodists and the Baptists lived in the village of Hirwaun. For communion they went to Aberdare, but they came together for prayer meetings at houses in Hirwaun. The Independents were generally members of Ebenezer, Trecynon.

In 1823, a small chapel was built which was called Nebo, or Pennebo. This was used until 1830, when, following a revival which drew many additional members and listeners, a larger chapel was required. This was used for several years without formal seating or adornments. Eventually, in 1836, this was rectified. The minister from 1823 until 1835 was Joseph Harrison of Ebenezer, Trecynon, but when his ministry at Ebenezer came to an end so did his connection with Nebo.

In early 1836, John Davies of Llantrisant became minister at both Ebenezer and Nebo, and he remained until 1840, when he moved to Mynyddbach, near Swansea. Thereafter, Ebenezer and Nebo had separate ministers.

== The pastorate of William Williams 1841–77 ==
William Williams was inaugurated at Nebo in May 1841. By 1850, the chapel had become much too small to house the congregation, so a larger chapel was built at a cost of £1,100: it could accommodate 800 people. The new building was opened on 9 March 1851. In 1853, Nebo was recorded as having a membership of 250, with 200 in the Sunday School.

Williams died in January 1877. A number of ministers officiated at his funeral, including Thomas Rees of Swansea.

== The 1904-05 Religious Revival ==
During the Revival of 1904-05, the leading evangelist Evan Roberts visited Hirwaun and services were held at several chapels, including Nebo, The chapel was said to be full at 9.00 a.m. and the congregation remained in the crowded building until Roberts finally arrived in later afternoon.

== Closure ==
The chapel remained open into the 21st century, but closed in 2007. The building was sold for conversion to a dwelling. It featured in the BBC TV series Restoration Home.

== Bibliography ==
- Jones, Alan Vernon (2004). Chapels of the Cynon Valley. Cynon Valley Historical Society. ISBN 0953107612.
