= Pickering Park, Kingston upon Hull =

Park in Kingston upon Hull, England

Coordinates: 53.7324°N 0.3993°W

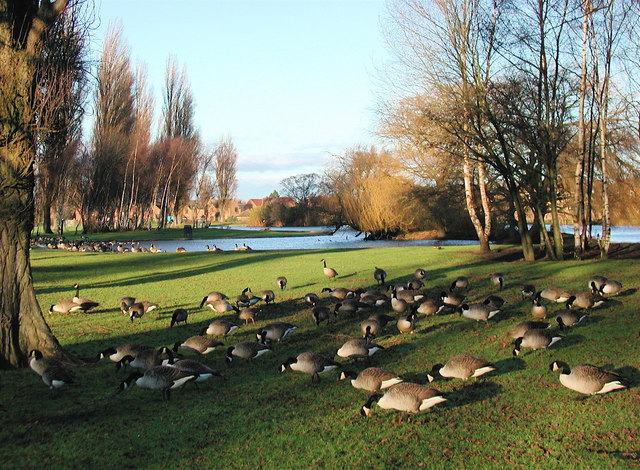
Pickering Park (January 2007)

Pickering Park is a park in the western suburbs of Kingston upon Hull, on the north side of Hessle Road, near the former Kingston High School in Anlaby, East Riding of Yorkshire, England.

== Description and facilities ==
Pickering Park is a council run park of 25.62 acres (103,700 m^{2}) with an ornamental and sensory gardens, aviaries, and a playground and paddling pool. Sport facilities at the park are four football pitches, and an 80 peg lake for fishing.

== History ==
The park was opened 13 July 1911, a gift from Christopher Pickering, a successful trawler owner, and benefactor; part of a model village development including almshouses and a children's home. The city's first nautical museum, the Museum of Fisheries and Shipping opened in Pickering Park in 1912, later to move to the former Hull Dock company offices and become the Hull Maritime Museum.

The associated almshouses, the former museum (as of 2011 a boxing club), and a related pumping station, are all listed buildings, as are the original iron park gates, which are one of the few early 20th century ornamental iron structures in Hull to have survived the Second World War drive for scrap iron.
