= Horeb Chapel, Llwydcoed =

Chapel in Llwycoed, Rhondda Cynon Taf, Wales

Coordinates: 51.7362°N 3.4607°W

Horeb, Llwydcoed is an Independent (Congregationalist) chapel in Llwydcoed, Aberdare, Wales.

== Early history ==
Prayer meetings had been held in the Llwydcoed district for many years by members of Ebenezer, Trecynon. Eventually they built a schoolroom which was also used as a British School. Horeb was founded as a church in 1859 when members transferred from Ebenezer. They built the chapel at a cost of £800 and it could set 350 people. When the chapel was opened one of the deacons, Thomas Williams, gave a donation of £20 towards the cost on condition that the congregation collected £80, which they did. After the opening of the chapel the schoolroom was used as a vestry at the rear of the building

The first minister was Abraham Matthews, who came from Bala College to minister at Horeb together with the church at Cwmdare. The ordination was held at Ebenezer, which is equidistant from both Llwydcoed and Cwmdare. He remained until the spring of 1865 when he was one of the leaders of the Welsh colony in Patagonia. On 21 April 1865 a meeting was held to mark Matthews's departure with a testimonial being presented.

Matthews was succeeded from 1865 until 1871 by Rev W. Thomas who was also minister of Elim, Cwmdare. He eventually moved to Gwernllwyn, Dowlais.

Rev William Samlet Williams, of Bala College, was ordained as minister in August 1871. He remained as minister for 52 years from 1871 until 1923 and there is a white marble plate in his memory at the church.

== Twentieth Century ==
There were 214 members in 1930. D.J. Barlow, also a county councillor, was minister from 1936 until 1951.

The chapel remained active into the twenty first century, with a small gathering of members continuing to meet at the vestry.

== Bibliography ==
- Jones, Alan Vernon (2004). Chapels of the Cynon Valley. Cynon Valley Historical Society. ISBN 0953107612.
