= Emlyn Williams (footballer, born 1903) =

Welsh footballer

Personal information
- Full name: Emlyn Williams
- Date of birth: 1903
- Place of birth: Aberaman, Wales
- Position: Forward

Senior career*
Years	Team	Apps	(Gls)
1926	Aberdare Athletic	12	(9)
1928	Clapton Orient	3	(1)
1929	Hull City	1	(0)
–	Merthyr Town	?	(?)
1931	Bournemouth	6	(2)
–	Ramsgate Press Wanderers	?	(?)
Total		22	(12)
- * Club domestic league appearances and goals

Emlyn Williams (born 1903, date of death unknown) was a footballer who played in The Football League for Aberdare Athletic, Bournemouth, Hull City and Clapton Orient. He was born in Aberaman, Wales.
