= Restoration Home (TV series) =

- Genre: Factual
- Starring: Caroline Quentin; Kieran Long; Dr Kate Williams
- Country of origin: United Kingdom
- Original language: English
- No. of seasons: 3
- No. of episodes: 20

Production
- Executive producers: Annette Clarke and Lisa Edwards
- Producer: Joff Wilson
- Camera setup: Multiple-camera setup
- Production company: Remarkable Television

Original release
- Network: BBC (BBC Two)
- Release: 5 July 2011 – 28 August 2013

Related
- Restoration (TV series)

Restoration Home is a BBC television series produced by Endemol who created the BBC series Restoration. The series follows owners of historic buildings as they restore them into 21st-century dream houses. The show is presented by Caroline Quentin who has an interest in the history and restoration of old buildings, architectural expert Kieran Long and social historian Dr Kate Williams who investigate the histories of the properties.

== Publication ==
A tie-in publication book, titled Restoration Home by Gavin Weightman published by BBC Publications accompanies the series.

== Series One ==
The introduction titles to the program were filmed at Bank Hall which was a building featured in the 2003 BBC series Restoration.

=== Episode 1 ===
The first building to feature is St Thomas à Becket Church, Pensford in Somerset, which was on the Heritage critical list. A flood in 1968 led to the church's deconsecration and it has been declared redundant. The owners first saw the building in 2007 and bought the listed church with plans to convert it into a three-bedroom house. As the church was transformed, its past was revealed.

=== Episode 2 ===
The second building is Nutbourne Common Pumping Station, Nutbourne, Horsham, West Sussex, which closed in the 1970s. The building was a ruin, containing all of its old mechanisms and machinery. The owners aimed to turn the concrete carcass into a carbon-efficient home. Research by Kieran Long and Dr Kate Williams revealed the history of the property.

=== Episode 3 ===
The third building, Stoke Hall in Derbyshire, a 30-room Georgian country house suffered from a leaking roof and widespread rot. The hall's 250-year-old décor was at risk of being destroyed. The restoration revealed the history of the house, with architectural and social connections to influential people. Research revealed that the hall's architect designed Chatsworth House.

=== Episode 4 ===
The fourth building, Stanwick Hall in Stanwick, Northamptonshire, was in poor condition and on the Buildings at Risk Register. Years of neglect had left fungus growing on walls running wet with damp and rotten timbers that were unstable. Evidence was uncovered showing the hall was built as a result of a financial scandal of the early 18th century.

=== Episode 5 ===
The fifth building, the manor house of Calverton Manorin Calverton, Buckinghamshire, is a mixture of different architectural styles, with parts thought to date from the 14th century. It is connected to a legend involving a rich widow, the local butcher, pots of gold and murder. As the building's architectural and historical secrets were revealed, the owners are faced with woodworm problems in the building's main structure.

=== Episode 6 ===
The sixth building, called Big House, is located in Landshipping, Pembrokeshire. First purchased as a crumbling carcass, it was in the past a building of grandeur and influence. Historical and architectural research revealed it was built on the proceeds of the coal industry.

== Series Two ==
Airing in 2012 Series Two featured six more buildings and their journeys as they are restored by their owners. The introduction piece to camera was filmed at Houghton House.

=== Episode 1 ===
The first building of the series is Coldbrook Farm, a 17th-century Grade II listed Welsh farmhouse. The run-down farmhouse is at the centre of the working farm buildings, which retains its lavish carved Tudor timberwork, which reveals the true age of the building. The owners are restoring the building while attempting to mix the old building with modern aspects.

=== Episode 2 ===
Following the restoration of Sandford House in Scotland, designed by Baillie Scott.

=== Episode 3 ===
Following the restoration of The Elms, a Grade II listed Georgian house in Derbyshire.

=== Episode 4 ===
A couple want to turn the 16th-century Old Manor in Norfolk into a dream home.

=== Episode 5 ===
A couple turn One Abbey Lane, a 16th-century Tudor period building in Southam, Warwickshire, into a family home. Kieran Long visits Little Moreton Hall to gain insight into the Tudor styled home.

=== Episode 6 ===
A couple are attempting to restore Coulton Mill, a 13th-century, 10-acre site in Yorkshire. Kieran Long visits nearby Crakehall Mill to see what the mill would have looked like.

== Series Three ==
=== Episode 1 ===
A couple have bought a Georgian House at Rock Farm and an extraordinary discovery is made.

=== Episode 2 ===
A couple sink into their life's savings by saving a long-lost estate Little Naish.

=== Episode 3 ===
Two friends buy a neglected 19th-century Pitkennedy school and to try and save it.

=== Episode 4 ===
A couple with a small budget attempt to transform a Nebo Chapel, a Victorian chapel in Nebo, Hirwaun, in the Welsh valleys. To better understand Nebo Chapel's philosophical and architectural antecedents, Kieran Long visits St Paul's, Covent Garden and the Royal Institute of British Architects in London and two Welsh chapels, Maesyronnen Chapel and Peniel Chapel. To better understand the history of the chapel, Kate Williams visits Dr Williams's Library and Parliamentary Archives in London and Glamorgan Archives in Leckwith, Cardiff, Wales.

=== Episode 5 ===
Kate Armstrong attempts to restore the 110 rooms of Cassillis House in Ayrshire.

=== Episode 6 ===
Simon Kelsey attempts to save the once grand Victorian townhouse of Christopher Pickering on 114 Coltman Street in Hull, East Yorkshire, England.

=== Episode 7 ===
A couple buy a once grand and wealthy estate, St Peter's Barn had been overlooked for generations and carved up by modern farming practices.

=== Episode 8 ===
A couple's dream Neo-Gothic home in Devon, "Barnhill," proves to be a nightmare, as costs spiral out of control. Kate Williams's historical research reveals that the 19th century owner William Mallick, was responsible for the major Neo-Gothic transformation of the original cob structure. In order to better understand the building, Kieran Long visits Church of St Barnabas, Pimlico and comes to believe it may have been influenced by the architect William White.
