= Aberaman =

Village in Rhondda Cynon Taf, Wales

Coordinates: 51°42′03″N 3°25′36″W

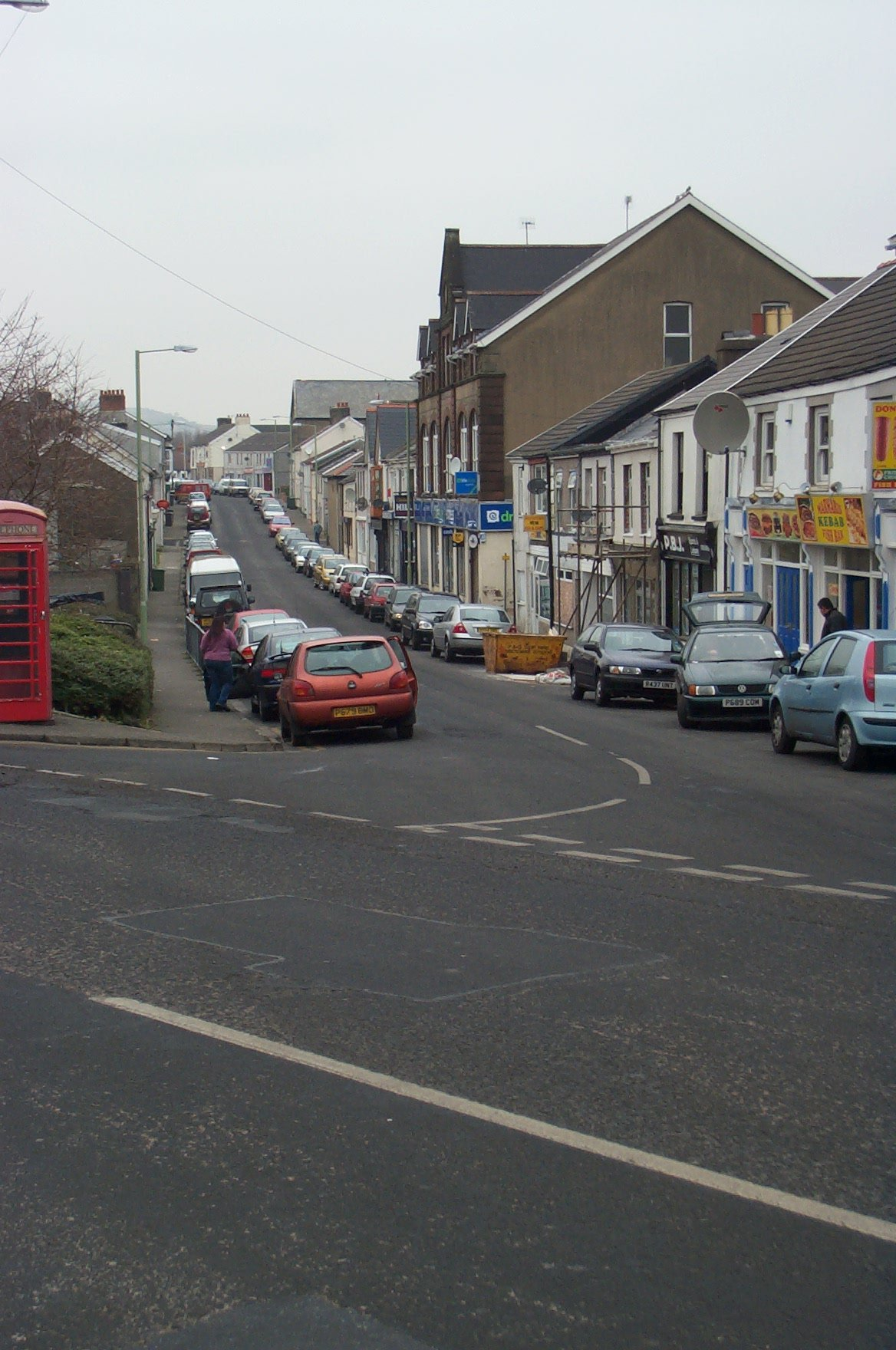
- Lewis Street, the main shopping district of the village

- Location within Rhondda Cynon Taf
- Population: 9,964 (Mid-2017 Estimate)
- Principal area: Rhondda Cynon Taf
- Preserved county: Mid Glamorgan
- Country: Wales
- Sovereign state: United Kingdom
- Post town: ABERDARE
- Postcode district: CF44
- Police: South Wales
- Fire: South Wales
- Ambulance: Welsh
- UK Parliament: Merthyr Tydfil and Aberdare
- Senedd Cymru – Welsh Parliament: Cynon Valley

Aberaman is a village near Aberdare in the county borough of Rhondda Cynon Taf, south Wales. It was heavily dependent on the coal industry and the population, as a result, grew rapidly in the late nineteenth century. Most of the industry has now disappeared and a substantial proportion of the working population travel to work in Cardiff and the M4 corridor. Many residents also work in the nearby towns of Aberdare and Pontypridd.

== History ==
=== Early Aberaman ===
Located to the south of Aberdare, the area that would become Aberaman was predominantly agricultural land until the early nineteenth century. From at least 1524 Aberaman was the home of the Mathew family, who owned land throughout Glamorgan and who came to prominence in the seventeenth century. In 1637, William Mathew presented the bell to St. John's Church and three members of the family served as High Sheriff of Glamorgan. In 1788 the Aberaman Estate passed to three sisters, Eleanor, Rebecca and Maria Eleanora. Eleanor Mathew is remembered as a great philanthropist who endowed the almshouses of Aberdare to accommodate four poor persons.

The family seat was at Aberaman Isha, later known as Aberaman House (which is still extant but much altered). The last of the Mathew family, Edward Mathew, died in 1788 and the estate was broken up after two centuries and divided between his three daughters and their husbands.

=== Industrial Aberaman ===
In 1806, Anthony Bushby Bacon, an illegitimate son of Anthony Bacon, a prominent iron master at Merthyr Tydfil, bought Aberaman House. He shared the Hirwaun ironworks with his brother but proceeded to sell his share to his brother and with the proceeds from the sale, he purchased the Matthews estate at Aberaman, including Aberaman House. Bacon, also known as Anthony Bacon II, did not aspire to be an iron master like his father and, in 1814, sold the entire Cyfarthfa estate, which he alone had inherited, to Richard Crawshay. For the rest of his life he used the Aberaman estate as a summer residence. He died there on 11 August 1827.

After his death, it passed to Crawshay Bailey, who owned the ironworks at Nantyglo and Beaufort. Bailey recognised the potential of the rich coal seams of the Aberdare and Rhondda valleys and bought up land in these areas in the 1830s. Amongst the lands he acquired was the Aberaman estate, which he bought from the executors of Anthony Bacon II, together with its mansion, by indenture dated 17 February 1837. It was several years before he began speculating for coal. By 1845, Crawshay Bailey had, in partnership with Josiah John Guest, built the Aberdare Railway and, around this time, the Aberaman Ironworks and a number of collieries associated with it were opened. Bailey remained the owner of the Aberaman Estate but despite the profitability of his colliery activities, the depression in the iron trade (see below) meant that the enterprise did not prove as successful as Bailey had hoped so he decided to sell the Aberaman estate and return to Monmouthshire. He disposed of the entire Aberaman estate including its collieries, ironworks, brickworks and private railway, to the Powell Duffryn Steam Coal Co. by indenture dated 2 February 1867 for the sum of £123,500. Bailey retired to Abergavenny.

Around 1843, the valuable steam-coal seams on the Blaengwawr estate began to be exploited by David Davis, Blaengwawr. Davis was a self-made man whose family firm later became one of the most important in the South Wales coal trade, with interests in both the Aberdare and Rhondda valleys.

During the second half of the nineteenth century, Aberaman continued to grow southwards. During the early years of the twentieth century the area known as Godreaman became built up, meaning that there was unbroken development between Aberaman and neighbouring Cwmaman, which was a settlement dependent almost wholly on the coal industry. By this time, Lewis Street at the heart of Aberaman village had developed into a small urban and commercial core around the Aberaman Hall and Institute (see below).

== Demography ==
The industrial developments of the mid-1840s were the catalyst for the growth of Aberaman as an industrial settlement. The earliest housing in the 1840s took the form of a ribbon development southwards from Aberdare along Cardiff Road. In the 1850s, the settlement grew out from Cardiff Road as, amongst others, Curre Street, Holford Street, Gwawr Street and Lewis Street were built. There were also settlements near the collieries, including Incline Row and Bell Place near Aberaman Colliery, and Blaengwawr Row and Blaengwawr Cottages adjacent to Blaengwawr Colliery.

John Griffith, in his evidence to the inspectors compiling the 1847 Education Reports reported that Aberaman had only been in existence for eighteen months, yet its population stood at 1200. This figure was expected to increase to 4,800 within a year. Fifty carpenters and eighty masons were reported to be employed in the building of industrial housing.

Two contemporary accounts give a vivid description of the conditions prevailing in Aberdare as the area struggled to cope with the population explosion.

On 1 December 2016, following The Rhondda Cynon Taf (Communities) Order 2016, the community of Aberaman was split into two new communities, Aberaman North and Aberaman South, which are coterminous with the electoral wards of the same names.

== Industry ==
=== Iron ===
Aberaman Ironworks was the last ironworks to be opened in the Aberdare Valley. It was established in 1845 by Crawshay Bailey and the first iron was produced in 1847. However the works were not successful. They closed temporarily in 1854 but re-opened the following year. In 1862 it appears that Bailey sought to sell the works for £250,000 but failed to find a buyer. Following Bailey's retirement the works were eventually taken over by the Powell Duffryn Company but were never worked again following their closure in 1866.

=== Coal ===
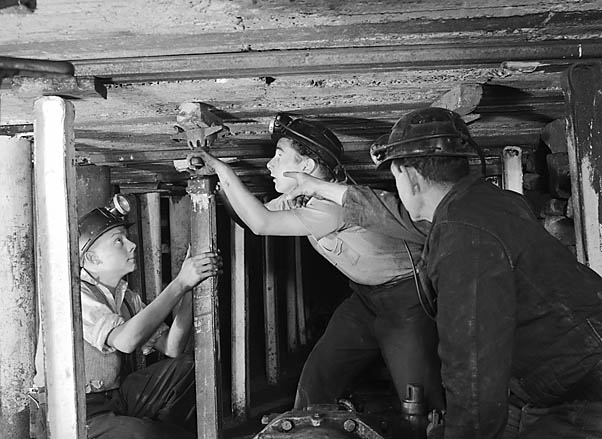
Aberaman Miners' Training Centre, 1951

Crawshay Bailey was also the pioneer of the coal industry at Aberaman, opening the Aberaman Colliery in 1845. This passed for the Powell DuffrynCompany in 1866 after their purchase of the Aberaman Estate. In 1909 the first Mines Rescue Station in South Wales was opened at the Aberaman Colliery and at this time over a thousand men were employed there. The manager of the colliery at this time was E.M. Hann who was a powerful figure in the South Wales coal trade for many years. Powell Duffryn continued to own the colliery until nationalisation in 1947 when it was taken over by the National Coal Board. Aberaman Colliery closed in 1965.

== Government ==
Aberaman currently comprises two electoral wards, Aberaman North and Aberaman South, for the purposes of electing members to the unitary Rhondda Cynon Taf County Borough Council. Aberaman has formed an electoral ward since the formation of Glamorgan County Council in 1889 and Aberdare Urban District Council in 1894.

== Language ==
At the start of the twentieth century the vast majority of the inhabitants of Aberaman, many of whom were migrants from rural Welsh counties, were Welsh-speaking. By 2011 the proportion speaking Welsh had fallen to 9.2%.

== Religion ==
Nonconformist chapels in Aberaman included Gwawr (Baptist), Saron (Independent) and Libanus (Calvinistic Methodist), all of which dated from the growth of the village in the late 1840s. All have now closed.

== Culture ==
Much of the social life of Aberaman was centred on the imposing Aberaman Hall and Institute in Lewis Street. A campaign to develop a Public Hall and Institute at Aberaman dated from 1892 when a public meeting was held in Saron Chapel. Until that point the chapels had been dominant in public life and the development of a secular hall, in hindsight, could be seen as the beginning of their long decline. Many years elapsed before sufficient funds were raised to begin the building work and the ceremony to lay the foundation stone was held on 2 October 1907, on the site previously occupied by the Aberaman Reading Institute. The hall was officially opened by Keir Hardie MP on 14 June 1909.

Designed by an Aberdare architect, Thomas Roderick, and built by John Morgan and Son, the hall's facilities included two billiards rooms, two games rooms, a swimming pool in the basement, Committee Room, a Lending Library and Reference Room, and a Lecture Hall. Its crowning glory was the main auditorium with seating for 1,800 people with a first floor offering additional capacity.

Throughout the twentieth century the hall was the social and cultural centre for Aberaman. It was eventually destroyed by fire in November 1994.

== Schools ==
=== Primary schools ===
- Blaengwawr Primary (Gwawr Street/Cardiff Road)
- Oaklands Primary (Maes Y Deri)

=== Secondary schools ===
Aberaman was formerly home to Blaengwawr Comprehensive School, a secondary school in the heart of the community. This school was closed, however, at the end of the 2014 school year due to the establishment of Aberdare Community School.

== Notable people ==
See Category:People from Aberaman

- Patrick Hannan, journalist and broadcaster
- Arthur Linton, cyclist
- Jimmy Michael, cyclist
- Alf Sherwood, former footballer
- Reg Pugh, former footballer
- Rhys Shellard, Rugby Union
- Emlyn Williams (footballer, born 1903)

== See also ==
- Aberaman Athletic F.C.
