= Libanus Chapel, Aberaman =

Former chapel in Aberaman, Rhondda Cynon Taf, Wales

Coordinates: 51.7037°N 3.4313°W

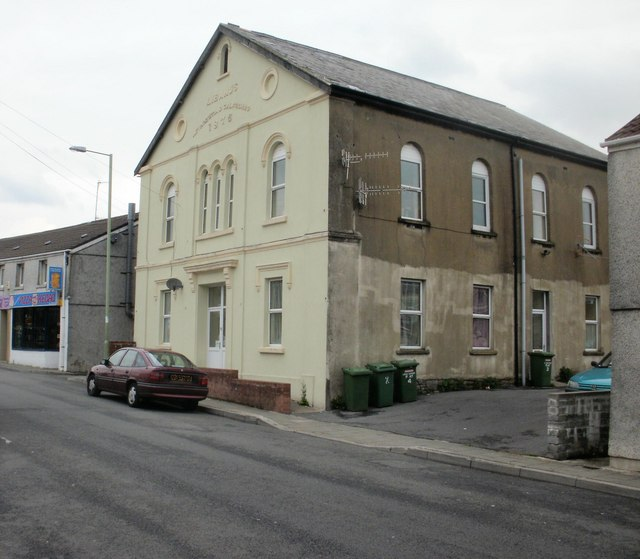
Libanus Chapel

Libanus Chapel was a Calvinistic Methodist chapel in Lewis Street, Aberaman, formed as a branch of Carmel, Trecynon. It was founded in the very early days of Aberaman as an industrial settlement, on land donated by Crawshay Bailey. Bailey was the owner of the Aberaman Estate since 1837, and his industrial activities were the catalyst for the industrial development of the locality.

== Early history ==
The original chapel was built in Regent Street in 1848, although a Sunday school had been held nearby. The cost of the original building was £500 and the building accommodated a congregation of 550. There were 69 members in 1848 and some members are said to have joined Libanus having left Gwawr Baptist Chapel nearby. A gallery was installed in 1850. By 1853 Libanus had 85 members.

A new chapel was built in Lewis Street in 1876.

E. M. Evans from Trefeca College was inaugurated as minister of Libanus on 30 January 1893.

== Twentieth century ==
J. Harris Jones was inaugurated as minister of Libanus on 25 May 1903, having previously been the minister of Llest church in the Garw Valley. The services were presided over by William James, minister of Bethania, Aberdare. Harris Jones remained at Libanus until 1907.

In 1907 a split occurred in the church. The reason was that the Calvinistic Methodist district meeting had agreed a pay rise for all ministers in the locality. (In contrast to the Baptists and Independents these decisions were taken centrally, a feature that can be traced back to the secession from the established church.) The deacons at Libanus, several of whom were described as holding socialistic tendencies, objected, as they believed the minister's salary was sufficient. It was soon rumoured that some of the deacons were seeking to be rid of the minister in order to replace him with the Independent Labour Party activist George Bibbings, who was a candidate for the ministry. A long-running dispute transpired, with the church split into two factions who clashed openly and even at times lapsed into physical violence. The majority of the members, in contrast to the deacons, were said to support the minister, while women among the congregation were accused of behaving like suffragettes. A committee was eventually appointed by the district meeting, chaired by the Rev. J. Lewis of Hebron, Godreaman, to seek a resolution. In time the committee resolved to ask the minister to resign his pastorate. Four members of the congregation subsequently wrote to the district meeting seeking to overturn this resolution but it was unanimously endorsed by the district meeting. In September, however, it was reported in the denominational journal, Y Goleuad, that the minister had been advised to resign his pastorate and that he had consented to do so.

Electric lighting was installed at Libanus in 1922. A centenary history, by D. J. Jones, was published in 1948.

== Later history ==
The chapel was closed in 1985 and converted into flats circa 2004.

== Bibliography ==
- Jones, Alan Vernon (2004). Chapels of the Cynon Valley. Cynon Valley Historical Society. ISBN 0953107612.
