= David Price (Welsh Independent minister) =

Welsh Independent minister, born 1809

David Price (1809 – 5 December 1878) was a Welsh independent minister at Aberdare. He played a formative role in the development of this industrial community during the nineteenth century and, in addition to his religious activities, became a member of the Aberdare School Board and sought to play a conciliatory role during industrial disputes such as the Aberdare Strike of 1857–8.

Price began life as a working miner and recalled this period when addressing a public meeting called by Henry Austen Bruce during the 1857-8 Aberdare Strike. He became a member of the Independent church at Glyn-neath in 1830, and began preaching there in 1836. Having moved to Aberdare, he became a member of Ebenezer, Trecynon, the earliest Independent chapel in the immediate vicinity of Aberdare. In 1843, he was one of fourteen members from Ebenezer who left to establish the new church at Siloa, Aberdare, and Price was directly involved, as a workman, in the constriction of the original building, and served as its treasurer for many years. Soon after he was ordained as its minister.

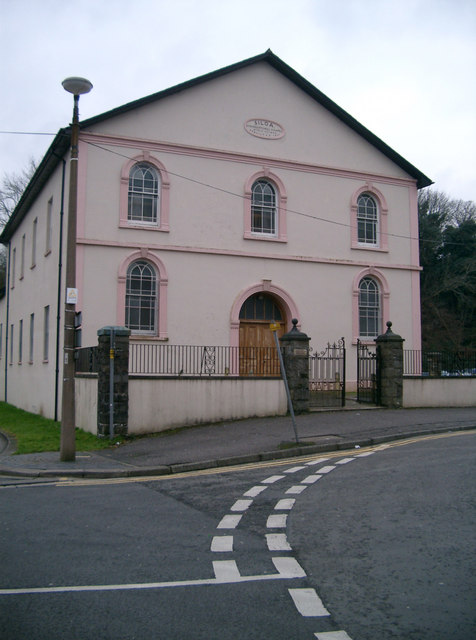
Siloa Chapel, Aberdare

Siloa was established at the very time when Aberdare was rapidly developing as an industrial settlement as a result of the growth of the steam coal trade. During his pastorate, large numbers of migrants, notably from the rural counties of Carmarthenshire, Cardiganshire, Pembrokeshire and Breconshire, stimulated the rapid growth of the membership at Siloa to over 600, making it the most numerous church in the valley in terms of membership by the 1860s. In 1866, the church presented him with an address and a gift of £170, raised solely by members of the church, in recognition of his services.

David Price was instrumental in establishing additional chapels at Bethesda, Abernant, where he also served as pastor, and at Cwmbach, and was also involved with the new causes at Aberaman, Mountain Ash and Cwmbach. In contrast to his namesake contemporary among the Baptists of Aberdare, Thomas Price, he work was mainly concentrated in his immediate locality but he established a reputation as an effective leader and powerful preacher. A biography was published in the 1890s, written by his successor at Siloa, D. Silyn Evans.

David Price was involved in political life throughout his pastorate, though not to the same extent as his contemporary, Thomas Price. They did, however, share a natural antipathy towards trade unionism, as demonstrated by David Price's remarks during the 1857–8 Aberdare Strike. In 1871, he was elected a member of the Aberdare School Board.

Price died on 5 December 1878, shortly before his 68th birthday. He was buried at Aberdare Cemetery.

== Sources ==
=== Books and Journals ===
- Turner, Christopher B. (1984). "Religious revivalism and Welsh Industrial Society: Aberdare in 1859". Llafur: The Journal of the Society for the Study of Welsh Labour History. 4 (1): 4–13.
