= Ebenezer Chapel, Trecynon =

Former chapel in Trecynon, Rhondda Cynon Taf, Wales

Coordinates: 51.7220°N 3.4571°W

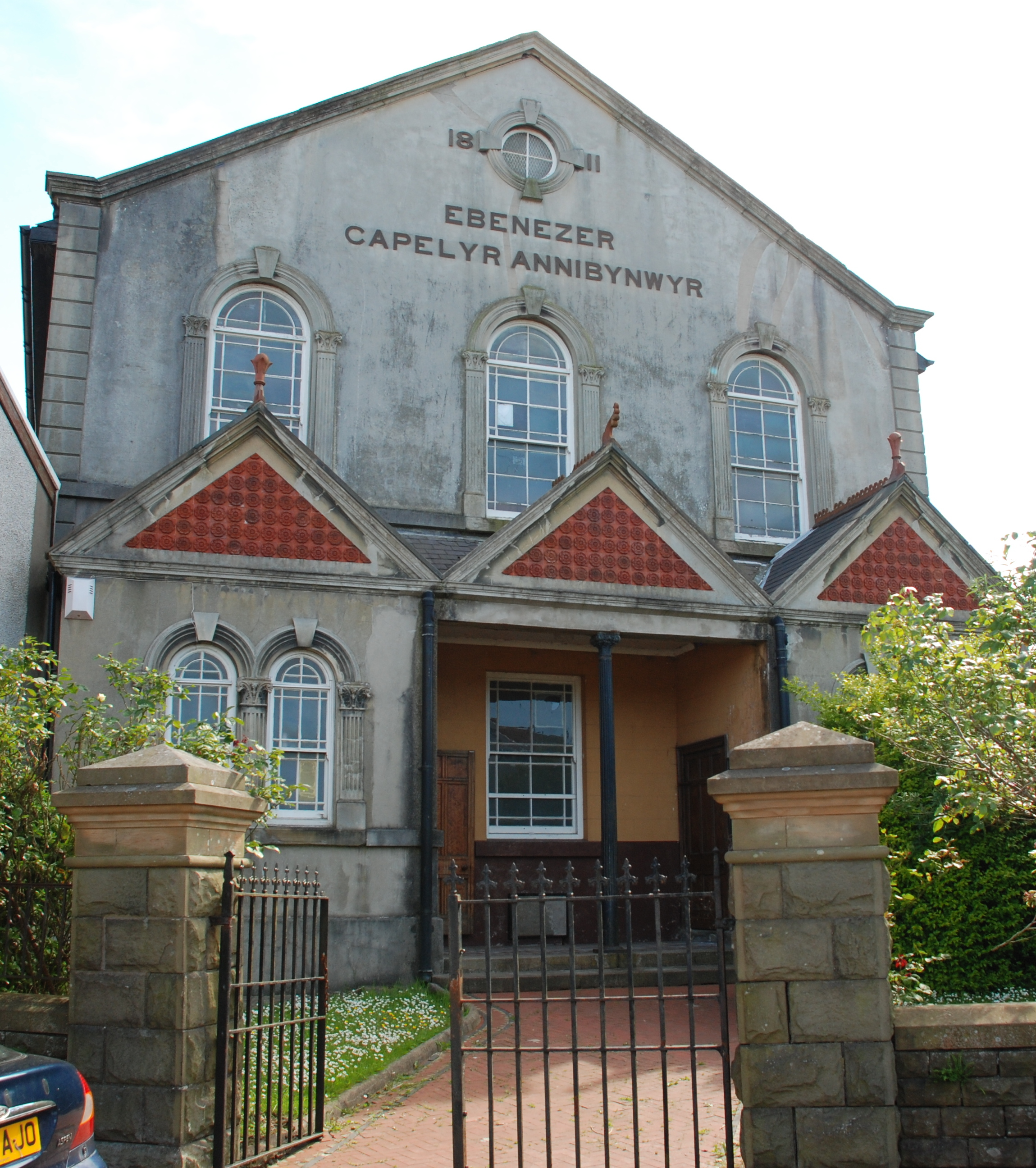
Ebenezer Chapel

Ebenezer, Trecynon was an Independent (Congregationalist) chapel in Ebenezer Street, Trecynon, Aberdare, Wales. It was one of the earliest Independent chapels in the Cynon Valley and remained an active place of worship until 2009.

== Early history ==
The history of Ebenezer dates back to the late eighteenth century when a congregation including Independents and Calvinistic Methodists worshipped together in dwelling houses, and occasionally succeeded in getting an ordained minister to visit them. The two denominations separated towards the end of 1799. The Independent cause then continued at the home of one Timothy Davies, which became known as Tŷ'r Capel (Chapel House) In 1804 the small congregation adapted a small house on Penypound for use as a place of worship, and obtained a licence as a house of worship in the court of Llandaff on 16 October 1804. G. Hughes of Groeswen ministered to the congregation at this time, but in 1809, Methusalem Jones of Merthyr took over, as he was closer to the congregation that his predecessor. Joseph Harrison, the future minister of Ebenezer, joined the congregation around this time.

== The first chapel ==
A chapel was built in 1811 and although land had been offered by Griffith Davies of Blaengwawr it was decided to build at Trecynon, then known as Heolyfelin, literally the 'Mill Road', a reference to the Aberdare Ironworks at Llwydcoed which were established in 1800. It was said that the congregation gathered stones for the original building from the common above Trecynon. The builders are recorded as Morgan Shon Morgan, John Richards of Penywaun and Thomas Philip Richards.

In 1813, the congregation resolved to call a minister and they chose David Jones, a member of the church at Mynyddbach, near Swansea. Jones was ordained at Ebenezer on 29 July 1813. However, within three years, the area was affected by a depression in trade and Ebenezer could not sustain the minister, Jones departed to be minister at Llanharan and Taihirion.

== The pastorate of Joseph Harrison, 1817–35 ==
Joseph Harrison, who had started preaching in 1812, became minister at Ebenezer in 1817 and presided over the church for the next twenty years. At the commencement of Harrison's ministry, there were only 26 members. However, its membership grew rapidly thereafter and it became the mother church of most Independent churches in the Cynon Valley. From 1828 until 1830 there was a period of revivalist fervor, and the increasing congregation meant that the original building was too small, and it was replaced in 1829 by a larger building that could accommodate around 600 people. The new building cost around £700 but the debt had been reduced to £240 by the time that Harrison's ministry came to an end in 1835.

Nebo, Hirwaun was established as a branch of Ebenezer in 1823. A split in 1835 saw Joseph Harrison leave with fifteen members and form Salem, Robertstown.

== The pastorates of John Davies and Thomas Rees, 1836–42 ==
Thomas Rees

In 1836, Ebenezer, together with Nebo, Hirwaun, invited John Davies of Llantrisant to be minister. Davies remained for four years, before moving to Mynyddbach. Following his departure the era of joint ministry with Nebo came to an end.

Thomas Rees, later of Swansea, became the minister of Ebenezer from 1840 until 1844. Rees had a short but successful ministry, and doubled the membership to around 300 within a year of his arrival. An increased membership resulted in an increased income for the church, but this led to a dispute between the minister and some of the senior members over whether the funds should be used to increase the minister's salary or to reduce the debt. Rees decided to leave Ebenezer in March 1842 having accepted a call from Siloa, Llanelli.

Ebenezer had no minister for the next two years and during this period, in 1843, a number of members left Ebenezer to establish Siloa, Aberdare. These included David Price, who became minister of the new church.

== The pastorate of William Edwards 1844–84 ==
Thomas Rees was succeeded by William Edwards, who remained until his death in 1884, during which time he played a part in founding most of the Independent churches of the Aberdare Valley. Edwards was a native of Ffestiniog, North Wales, who had worked for several years in the slate quarries before earning enough money to further his education and enter the ministry. His home at Trecynon was known as Meirion Cottage. Edwards studied at Brecon College and was invited to be minister at Ebenezer while still a student at that institution, and was inaugurated on 1 and 2 July 1844. Together with David Price of Siloa, Aberdare, he was responsible for establishing new causes at Cwmbach, Mountain Ash and Aberaman. In 1859, Horeb, Llwydcoed was established as a branch of Ebenezer. Despite the loss of members to these new churches, the membership of Ebenezer continued to grow, and was higher than at any time in its history by 1871.

Ebenezer was renovated in 1852 and an adjacent 'Ebenezer Hall' built which housed the Sunday School. By 1853, Ebenezer was recorded as having 340 members, with 224 in the Sunday School, In 1859, the chapel was built for a third time at a cost of at least £800. The chapel could accommodate 900 people,

In 1856, Edwards sought election to the Aberdare Local Board of Health, seeking to emulate Thomas Price of Calfaria, Aberdare who had set a precedent by being the first nonconformist minister to participate in local government in the locality.

During the 1868 General Election in the Merthyr Boroughs constituency, a number of political meetings took place at Ebenezer, in support of both Henry Richard and Richard Fothergill. The meeting in support of Richard, in September 1868, was chaired by David Davis, Maesyffynnon. Fothergill's meeting, in October, was equally enthusiastic and presided over by the Baptist minister, William Harris of Heolyfelin.

Edwards became President of the Union of Welsh Independents towards the end of his life. During his time at Aberdare he had a celebrated argument with Thomas Price about Baptism but the rift was healed and Price participated at his funeral. At the end of his ministry he was elected president of the Union of Welsh Independents.

== The pastorate of Grawys Jones, 1885–1925 ==
The next minister was Grawys Jones, who was ordained as minister on 22 and 23 September 1885. Grawys Jones also served for forty years, until 1925.

An extensive refurbishment by Owen Morris Roberts & Son took place in 1902. Following the renovation, preaching services were held in an attempt to clear part of the debt of £1,000. Elfed was among the guest preachers.

== 1904–05 Religious Revival ==
Ebenezer was particularly affected by the 1904–05 Religious Revival, which had begun at Loughor near Swansea. The revival aroused alarm among ministers for the revolutionary, even anarchistic, impact it had upon chapel congregations and denominational organization. In particular, it was seen as drawing attention away from pulpit preaching and the role of the minister. The local newspaper, the Aberdare Leader, regarded the revival with suspicion from the outset, objecting to the 'abnormal heat' which it engendered.

On Sunday 13 November, the revivalist Evan Roberts held meetings at Bryn Seion chapel in Trecynon. On the following evening, Monday 14 November, the revivalist meetings commenced at Ebenezer. Roberts addressed the meeting, reportedly repeating much of what he had said at Bryn Seion the previous day. After he spoke, one of his female companions (whose presence at the meetings was a notable feature of the revival) began to sing a hymn, and was soon joined by the entire congregation. Two more women addressed the meeting, while another woman read from the Scripture and prayed. Further meetings were held over the next two days, one of which lasted for several hours and another was addressed by Roberts's female followers from Loughor. Both the spontaneity of these meetings and the role played by women contrasted sharply with the conservative nature of nonconformist culture.

Within a week, the editor of the Aberdare Leader' was increasingly strident in his criticism of the revival, with the emotion being compared with the jingoism of the Boer War a few years previously. Ebenezer's minister, Grawys Jones, was also singled out for criticism for allowing such emotion to be displayed at a meeting where he presided. Revivalist meetings in the town of Aberdare itself were said to be far more disciplined and orderly than those at Trecynon.

The annual preaching meetings were turned into revival meetings which were said to have continued until a late hour on successive nights.

== 20th century ==
After four years without a minister, William Morse arrived at Ebenezer in 1929 and remained for thirty years. During this time, David Emlyn Thomas, MP for Aberdare from 1946 until 1954 was a deacon at Ebenezer. Membership fell to 365 by 1945 and to 330 by 1954.

== Later history ==
Membership was 564 in 1907 and remained at 330 in 1954. Ebenezer's last minister was R.O. Thomas, who served from 1961 until 1986. The chapel remained active into the twenty first century and ceased to be a place of worship in April 2009. The congregation still meet today in single numbers in the Chapel School Room, renamed 'Ebenezer Newydd 2009'.

Planning permission was applied to convert the chapel into flats. In October 2026, the chapel will go to auction with a guide price of £1.

== Sources ==
=== Books ===
- Jones, Alan Vernon (2004). Chapels of the Cynon Valley. Cynon Valley Historical Society. ISBN 0953107612.
- Morgan, Kenneth O. (1981). Rebirth of a Nation. Wales 1889–1980. Oxford University Press. ISBN 0-19-821760-9.

=== Journals ===
- Turner, Christopher B. (1984). "Religious revivalism and Welsh Industrial Society: Aberdare in 1859". Llafur: The Journal of the Society for the Study of Welsh Labour History. 4 (1): 4–13.
