= R. Ifor Parry =

Welsh preacher

Robert Ifor Parry (1908–1975) was a Congregationalist minister and schoolmaster at Aberdare.

== Early life ==
Parry was born at Holyhead, Anglesey, son of Benjamin Parry, who was employed as an engineer on ships sailing from Holyhead to Ireland. Educated at the Holyhead County School, he enrolled at the University College, Bangor, where he earned a first-class degree in History in 1929 and an MA in 1931 for a thesis on the attitude of Welsh Independents to working class movements from 1815 to 1870. Given the history of Aberdare, his research interests may have been a factor in his receiving a call from Siloa, Aberdare, where he was ordained in June 1933. He was only the third minister in the church's history, following David Price (1843–78) and D. Silyn Evans (1880–1930). In 1940, he married Mona Morgan, whose father, Richard, was a deacon at Siloa.

== Siloa, Aberdare ==
Parry earned a reputation as a preacher at Aberdare, although his modern views on theology and the teaching of the Bible, clashed with the more traditional views of an older generation. He was invited to preach throughout Wales and at annual meetings both of his own denomination and other organisations. Parry also published a number of books and articles, in Welsh, mainly on various aspects of the history of nonconformity. He was also a noted local historian, who wrote a column for the local paper, the Aberdare Leader.

== Later life ==
Possibly due to a decline in membership, Price's long pastorate at Siloa came to an end in 1964, when he became Head of Religious Studies at Aberdare Boys‘ Grammar School. Ifor Parry died on 18 December 1975, and he left a substantial sum of money to the Aberdare Boys‘ Grammar School to endow the ‘Mona and Ifor Parry Trust Fund,’ the income from which was to be used, in part, to award an annual prize for local history.
