= Bethel Chapel, Gadlys =

Coordinates: 51.7183°N 3.4521°W

Bethel, Gadlys was an Independent (Congregationalist) chapel in Railway Street, Gadlys, Aberdare, Wales.

== Early history ==
Bethel was established in 1860 when thirty members from Salem, Robertstown broke away to establish a new church. The chapel was designed by Evan Jones of Aberdare and built at a cost of £747. The original chapel seated 600 people.

The first minister was William Harrison who was followed in 1859 by Hugh Hughes, known as Huw Tegai. He was previously a minister in Manchester but died suddenly in 1864, three days after collapsing while preaching in the pulpit.

Robert Evans was minister from 1866 until 1877 and D, Onllwyn Brace from 1885 until 1888. The membership in 1890 was 245. This rose to 344 in 1905, in the wake of the religious revival but fell to 280 by 1914.

J. Richards was minister from the late 1890s until 1907 when he departed for Bethel, Caernarfonshire.

== New Theology Controversy ==
Shortly afterwards divisions arose in the church over the New Theology, which led to the resignation of four deacons and a public dispute over the election of a treasurer to succeed one of those who had resigned. This doctrine, championed by R.J. Campbell gained significant support in South Wales at this time. This reflected the growing political tensions within nonconformity in the Aberdare Valley following the election of James Keir Hardie as MP for Merthyr Boroughs eight years earlier.

The chapel secretary sought to play down the division claiming that they involved only a small proportion of the membership. However, 24 members were said to be supportive of Campbell's views and were said to include all those who attended a Bible class on Sunday mornings.

== Twentieth Century ==
In 1913 the chapel was rebuilt at a cost of £2,975 with an organ costing £420. The new chapel had an elaborate interior including a ceiling covered with roses and a substantial gallery with an organ chamber at the far end.

Bethel remained open until the late 1980s. Derelict through the 1990s it was demolished in November 2003 and a house was built on the site.

== Bibliography ==
- Jones, Alan Vernon (2004). Chapels of the Cynon Valley. Cynon Valley Historical Society. ISBN 0953107612.
- Morgan, Kenneth O (1991). Wales in British Politics 1868–1922. Cardiff: University of Wales Press. ISBN 0708311245.
- Parry, Jon (1989). "Labour Leaders and Local Politics 1888–1902: The Example of Aberdare". Welsh History Review. 14 (3): 399–416.
- Rees, D. Ben (1975). Chapels in the Valley. The Ffynnon Press. ISBN 0-902158-08-2.
