= Llwydcoed =

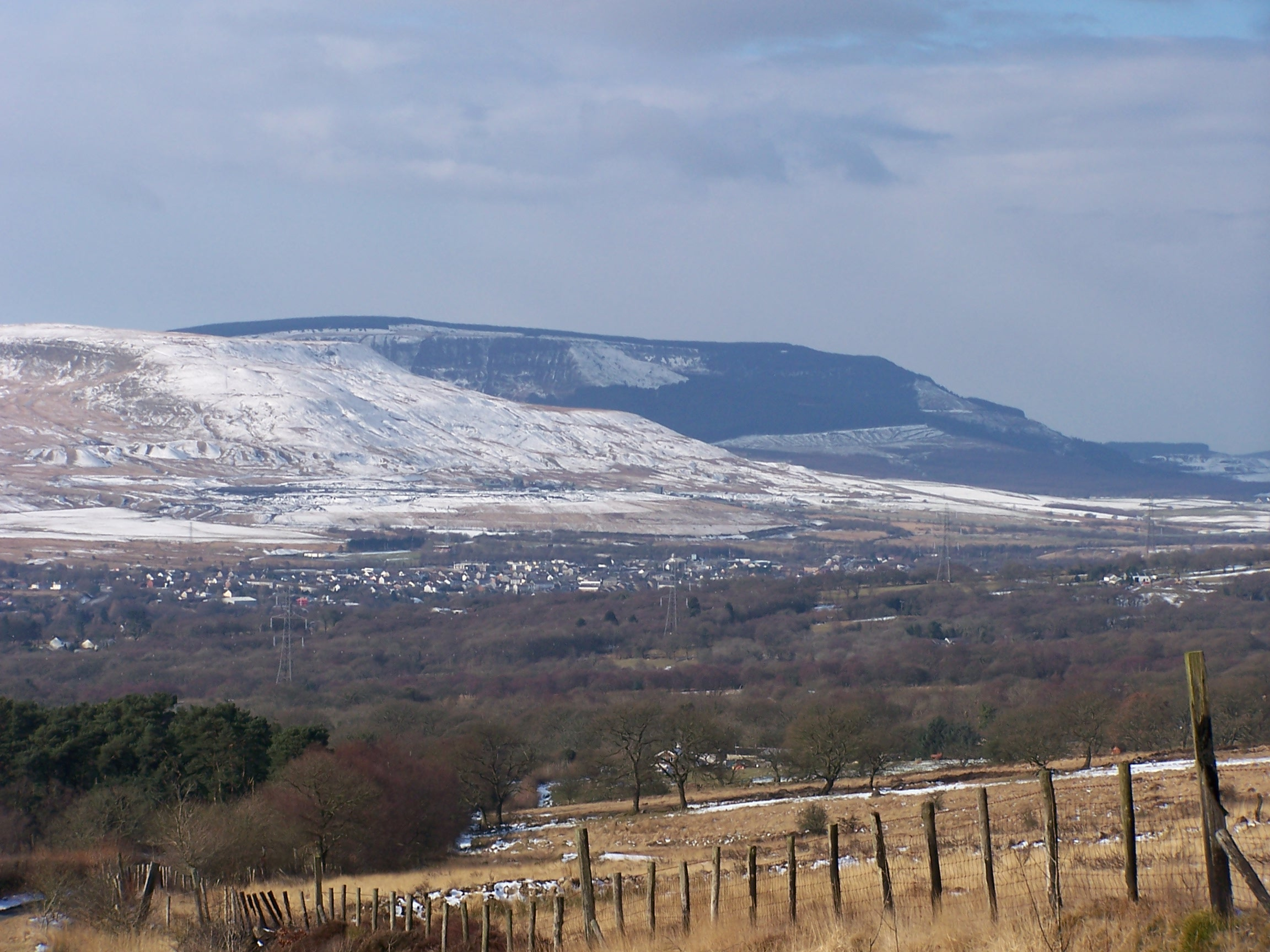
- View from Llwydcoed towards Hirwaun

- Location within Rhondda Cynon Taf
- Population: 1,300
- Principal area: Rhondda Cynon Taf
- Preserved county: Mid Glamorgan
- Country: Wales
- Sovereign state: United Kingdom
- Post town: ABERDARE
- Postcode district: CF44
- Police: South Wales
- Fire: South Wales
- Ambulance: Welsh
- UK Parliament: Merthyr Tydfil and Aberdare
- Senedd Cymru – Welsh Parliament: Cynon Valley
- List of places UK Wales Rhondda Cynon Taf 51.733°N 3.4667°W Community map: Map of the community

Llwydcoed is a small village and community north of the Cwm Cynon, near the town of Aberdare, Rhondda Cynon Taf, Wales, with a population of 1,302 as of 2011 census.

== History ==
The village initially developed in the Tregibbon area, where in 1801 workers' housing was built by Thomas ap Shencin ap Gibbon of Fforchaman Farm. Other early housing was built at Miner's Row, Founder's Row and Scales Houses. The names of these streets betray their early origins; the Scale family were among the founders of the works and remained partners until 1846.

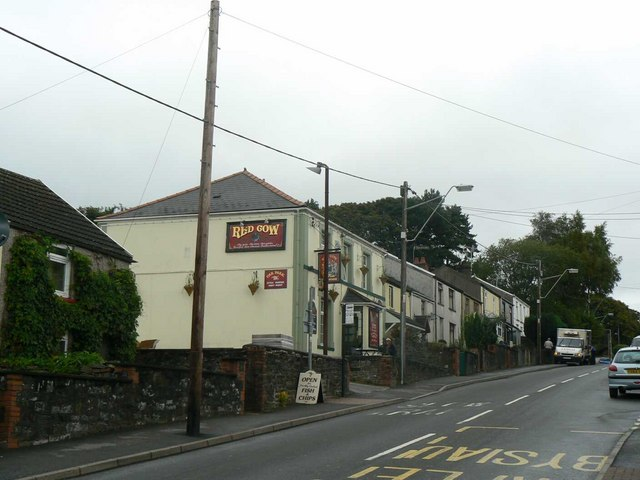
Red Cow Pub

In the second half of the 19th century a new period of growth was instigated by the development of the coal industry in the area. Matthew Wayne Esq. of the Gadlys Ironworks opened the Dyllas Colliery in 1840 and in 1849 Ysguborwen Colliery was sunk by Samuel Thomas and Thomas Joseph. Among the houses built in this period were those at Moriah Place, Horeb Terrace and Grey's Place. Exhibition Row was built in 1851 and was named Exhibition Row in honour of the Great Exhibition held at Crystal Palace that year.

== Industry ==
The Aberdare Ironworks were established at Llwydcoed in the early nineteenth century and in 1823 were taken over by Rowland Fothergill. Ownership later passed to his nephew, Richard.

Eight public houses were open in Llwydcoed at this time. They were The Earl Grey, Fox and Hounds, Red Cow, Corner House, The Mason's, Miner's Arms, the Dynevor Arms and the Croes Bychan. At that time stop tap was midnight and a local essayist recounts the boisterous nature of the revelries.

"It is said that more beer was lost (wasted) when the furnaces, coal mines and iron-ore undertakings were being worked, especially at the start of the month, and on pay Saturday Night, than is being drunk now." (Unknown Author. 'A Glance at the History of Llwydcoed' Translated by D Williams and D L Davies.)

== Government ==
Llwydcoed was one for many years an electoral ward for elections to Glamorgan County Council from 1889 and Aberdare Urban District Council from 1894.

It is currently part of Aberdare West/Llwydcoed electoral ward, for elections to Rhondda Cynon Taf County Borough Council. Llwydcoed is also a community in its own right.

== Transport ==
The Vale of Neath Railway mainline from Neath to Merthyr Tydfil arrived in 1853, opening Llwydcoed railway station in the same year. Taken over on grouping by the Great Western Railway in 1923, the line remained open until closure in 1962.

== Landmarks ==
Llwydcoed War Memorial is an obelisk-type war memorial located within the local park. It was unveiled in 1921.

St. James' Church, a Grade II listed building, is also known as the Red Church.

Bryncarnau Grasslands is a site special scientific interest.

== Notable people ==
- Abraham Matthews, one of the founders of the Welsh settlement in Patagonia was a Minister in Horeb, Llwydcoed chapel before leaving for South America.
- Stage and screen actor Ioan Gruffudd was born in Llwydcoed. Best known for playing Reed Richards in The Fantastic Four and for his role as Horatio Hornblower
- Griffith Rhys Jones aka Caradog worked at the Aberdare Ironworks within Llwydcoed village. There is a statue of Caradog in Victoria Square in the heart of Aberdare.
- Roy Noble, radio presenter on BBC Radio Wales and BBC Radio Cymru, lives in Llwydcoed.
- Stereophonics drummer Stuart Cable lived in Llwydcoed for a number of years up until his death in 2010.

== Bibliography ==
- Jones, Ieuan Gwynedd (1964). "Dr. Thomas Price and the election of 1868 in Merthyr Tydfil : a study in nonconformist politics (Part One)" (PDF). Welsh History Review. 2 (2): 147–172.
