= Christopher Pickering =

British businessman (1842–1920)

Christopher G. Pickering (9 November 1842 – 22 December 1920) was a British businessman and philanthropist. He made his fortune as a merchant and ship owner, particularly in the Kingston upon Hull fish trade. In 1914 he founded a park, almshouses, church and children's home in west Hull. The park and almshouses still bear his name.

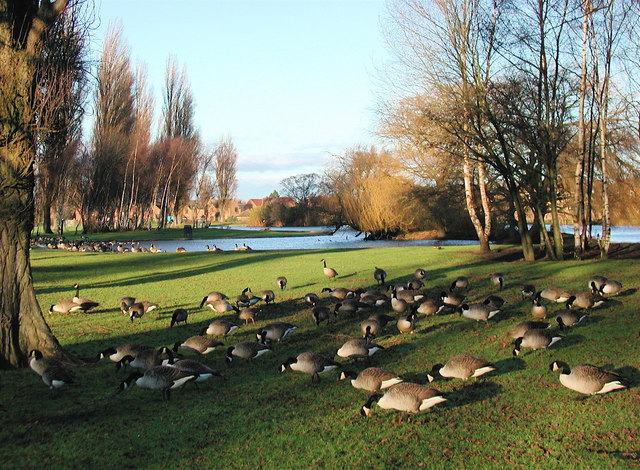
Pickering Park (January 2007)

== Biography ==
Christopher Pickering was born in 1842, the son of a tailor. In 1861 his occupation was that of a fish curer in Kingston upon Hull, and subsequently he became a fish merchant, and by 1881 a ship owner. He controlled together with a Mr. Haldane Pickering & Haldane's Steam Trawling Co. and the fish and ice merchants Pickering, Haldane & Co.

He married Rachael Blakestone, lived in 114 Coltman Street, Hull, from 1874 to 1889, and moved to Hornsea in 1889 when he purchased The Hall.

He founded six almshouses in Hornsea in 1908, and in 1914 he built almshouses, a church, park and children's home in the west of Kingston upon Hull.

He was presented with the Freedom of the City of Hull in 1920.

He died in December 1920 aged 78.

== Legacy ==
Both the Hull Almshouses (Christopher Pickering Lodge is now a grade II listed building) and the park (Pickering Park, Kingston upon Hull) he built still bear his name, as does a local council ward (Pickering Ward). The restoration of his Coltman Street home was featured in the third season of the BBC television series Restoration Home.
