= Thomas Rees (Congregational minister) =

Welsh minister and historian (1815–1885)

Thomas Rees (by John Thomas, 1875)

Thomas Rees (13 December 1815 – 29 April 1885) was a Welsh Congregational minister, who wrote a history of nonconformism. He was twice elected chairman of the Union of Welsh Independents.

== Early life ==
The son of Thomas Rees and his wife Hannah William, Rees was born at Pen Pontbren, Llanfynydd, Carmarthenshire, and brought up by his mother's family at Banc-y-fer, Llangathen, where he helped his grandfather, Dafydd William, a basket maker. He joined the Independent chapel at Capel Isaac and began to preach in March 1832. He took a job at a colliery at Llwydcoed, Aberdare, but fell ill and then set up a small school. In 1836 he moved to Craig-y-bargod, Merthyr Tydfil, and took charge of a small school there.

== Pastorates ==
Rees was ordained a minister on 15 September 1836 and then served as pastor at Craig-y-Bargoed (1836), Trecynon, Aberdare (1840), Llanelli (1842), Cendl (Beaufort), Breconshire/Mon. (1849) and Abertawe (1860). His chapel in Beaufort was Carmel Chapel; Beaufort was in the county of Brecknockshire (Breconshire) until 1879: see photos of Carmel Chapel on the Beaufort website.

== Honours ==
Rees was awarded an honorary doctorate of divinity in 1862 by Marietta College, Ohio. He was twice elected as Chairman of the Union of Welsh Independents, in 1873 and 1875, and then as Chairman of the Congregational Union of England and Wales in 1884, but he died at his home in Swansea on 29 April 1885, before his term of office could begin.

== Writings ==
Rees was widely known for his biblical commentaries. He was a co-founder of the first Welsh Independent quarterly, Yr Adolygydd. His History of Protestant Nonconformity in Wales (1861, 2nd ed. 1883) prepared the ground for a history of Welsh Independent churches, Hanes eglwysi Annibynol Cymru (1870 onwards), on the first four volumes of which he worked with John Thomas (1821–1892). He was criticized for denominational prejudice in the work, but made meticulous use of sources, so that it remains an important source work.

== References and sources ==
- Chisholm, Hugh, ed. (1911). "Rees, Thomas s.v. Another Thomas Rees" . Encyclopædia Britannica. Vol. 22 (11th ed.). Cambridge University Press. p. 975.
- Jenkins, R.T. "Rees, Thomas (1815–1885), Independent minister, and historian". Dictionary of Welsh Biography. National Library of Wales.
