= Old Manor, Saham Toney =

House in Norfolk, England

Coordinates: 52.5879°N 0.8037°E

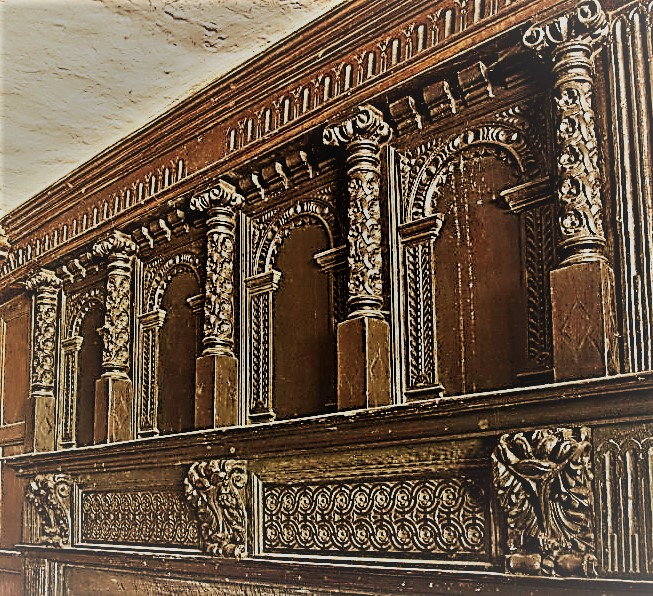
Old Manor, Dining room

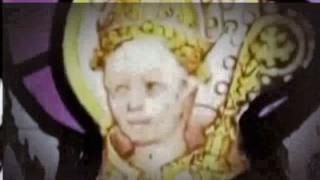
Old Manor, window

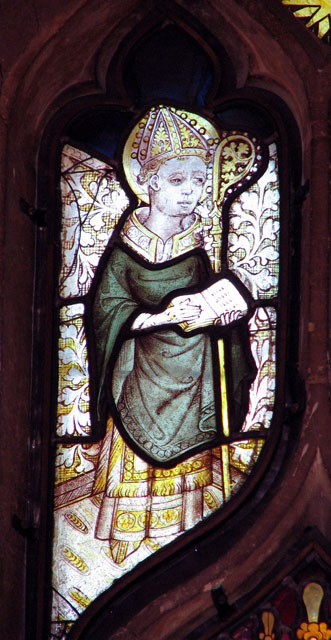
St Mary's church in Great Cressingham, window

The Old Manor is a Grade II listed building, which stands in Pages Lane/Page's Place in the Norfolk village of Saham Toney. The building was owned by Edward Goffe of Threxton, who died in 1612, and who is buried at Saham Toney. He left the building to his son. Edward Goffe founded the local school, where a plaque was erected in his name. There are almshouses, founded by Edward Goffe. The beautiful stained glass window was made in Norwich Cathedral and originally came from St Mary's church in Great Cressingham.

Restoration of the Old Manor was featured on an episode (Series 2 - Episode 4) of the BBC Two series Restoration Home
