= Carmel Chapel, Trecynon =

Former chapel in Aberdare, Rhondda Cynon Taf, Wales

Coordinates: 51.71862°N 3.45333°W

Carmel, Trecynon was a Calvinistic Methodist chapel located in Hirwaun Road, Trecynon, directly opposite the public park at Aberdare, Wales. Services at Carmel were conducted in the Welsh language, and the history of Carmel involves much more than the history of the building alone. Carmel was the first Calvinistic Methodist chapel to be established in the Aberdare district, and is considered the mother church of all Methodist chapels in the Cynon Valley. It remained an active church until the end of the twentieth century, but its decline mirrored that of the Welsh language in the area over the decades.

== Early history ==
The earliest meetings were said to have been held from 1799 onwards, and the first chapel was eventually built in 1829. This chapel cost around £1,000 and had seating for 700 people. The building was similar to many rural nineteenth-century chapels, with the pulpit being flanked by two entrance porches. A vestry was built in 1873. Behind the chapel, there was a small stable where horses could be kept for visiting preachers who travelled to the chapel on horseback.

== Opening of the 1896 chapel ==
The chapel was rebuilt in 1896 at a cost of £2,394. Special meetings to mark the opening of the new building were held over three days, from Sunday 1 November until Tuesday 3 November. This was heralded as a "red letter day" in the history of Carmel and a detailed report in the Calvinistic Methodist journal, the Goleuad, attributes as factors to their success. Firstly, the services of leading preachers from both within the Methodist ranks, but also from the Baptist and Independent (Congregationalist) denominations. Such collaboration between denominations was unusual at the time, a factor commented upon in another contemporary newspaper report. Secondly, the location and appearance of the new building were said to attract new members. A further factor was that the Monday when the services were held was a "Mabon's Day", which until 1898 was a monthly holiday that the miners attributed to the efforts of their leader at the time, William Abraham (Mabon). Finally, a splendid new organ had been installed, which attracted great interest and curiosity in the district. Press reports reveal that large crowds attended the services, with the adjacent schoolroom being used as the chapel was full to capacity.

The minister at the time was the Rev. H.T. Stephens, who had succeeded David Morgan Jones in 1893. His pastorate continued until 1922.

== Later history ==
Twentieth-century ministers at Carmel included Ivor Glyndwr Richards (1937-45), J.D. Eurful Jones (1960-66), Evan Emrys Evans (1968-71), and Glaslyn D. Bowen (1984-92). As well as religious services, a range of cultural activities took place at Carmel, included a flourishing dramatic tradition that survived until the 1950s. The Sunday School came to an end in the 1970s reflecting the increasingly elderly profile of the membership.

The chapel closed in 1988, and the remaining members transferred to Siloh, Trecynon, until 1996. Carmel was demolished in 1989, and a Plymouth Brethren meeting house was built on the site in 1993.

== Bibliography ==
- Jones, Alan Vernon (2004). Chapels of the Cynon Valley. Cynon Valley Historical Society. ISBN 0953107612.
