= Siloa Chapel, Aberdare =

Chapel in Aberdare, Rhondda Cynon Taf, Wales

Coordinates: 51.7131°N 3.4488°W

Siloa Welsh Independent Chapel
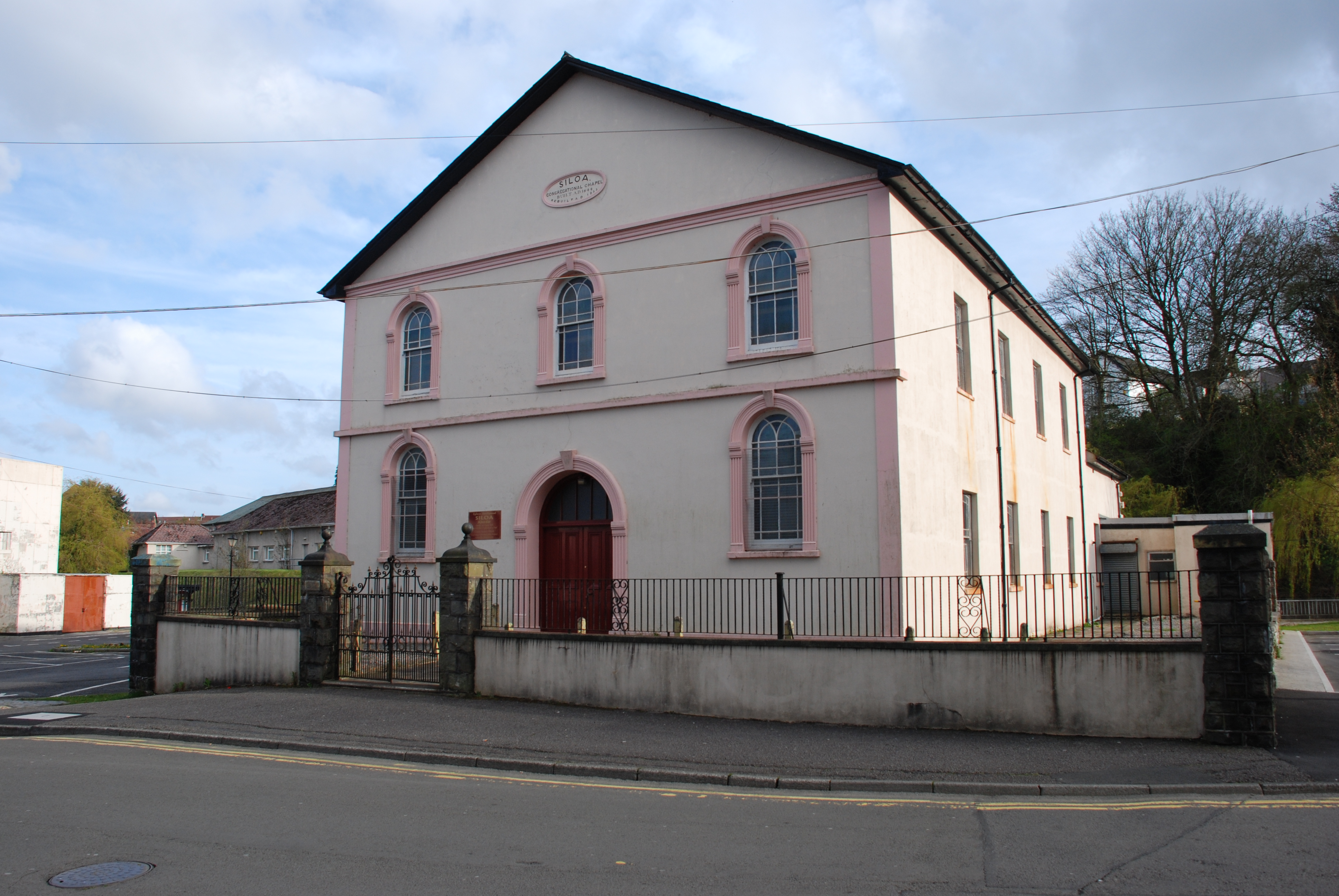
- Siloa Welsh Independent Chapel
- Location: Green Street, Aberdare
- Country: Wales
- Denomination: Independent (Congregationalist)

History
- Founded: 1841

Architecture
- Architectural type: Chapel
- Style: Early 19th century
- Completed: 1844

Specifications
- Capacity: 900

Siloa Chapel was the largest of the Welsh Independent, or Congregationalist, chapels in Aberdare. It operated from 1844 to 2020.

Services were held in the Welsh language. Established in 1844, Siloa was one of the few Welsh-language chapels in the locality to remain open in the 21st century. Siloa was notable for its long-serving ministers and in over a century there were only three pastorates, namely those of David Price (1843–1878), D. Silyn Evans (1880–1930) and R. Ifor Parry (1933–1964).

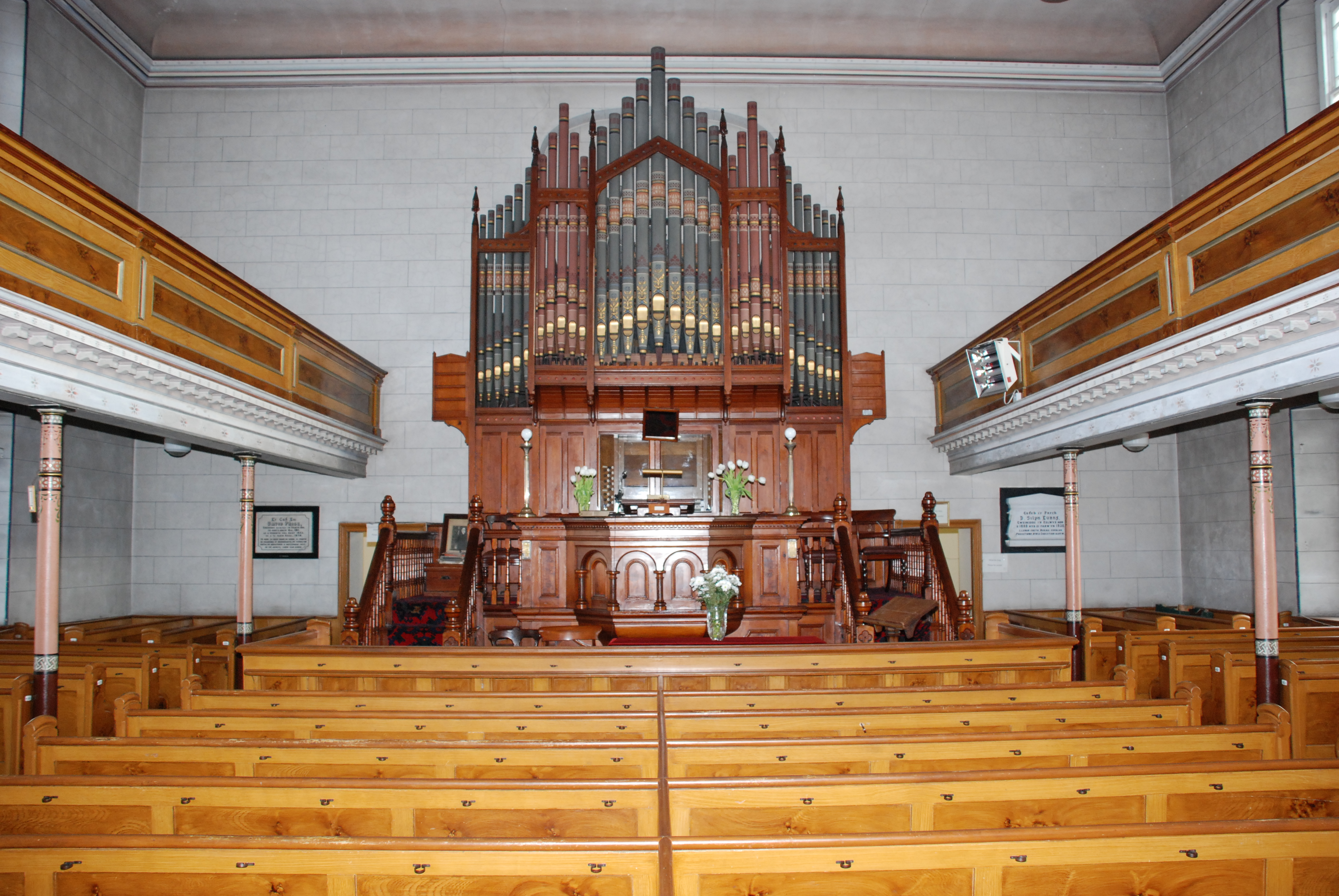
Interior

== Foundation ==
In 1841, Thomas Rees, then minister at Ebenezer, Trecynon, began to hold a Sunday school in what was then the adjacent village of Aberdare, and also began to preach in English, with a view of establishing an English-language cause. When Rees departed to Siloah, Llanelli, in early 1842, the original proposal was abandoned but a small group of members from Ebenezer continued to hold meetings, but in the Welsh language. The leading figure was David Price, who had recently moved to Aberdare from the Vale of Neath. At his instigation meetings began to be held in the long room of the Boot Inn, Aberdare. In 1843, fourteen members from Ebenezer, Trecynon, the oldest independent church in the district, sought to be released to establish a new church. Despite the reservations of some older members the request was approved and the new church was named Siloa, in deference to their former minister's new church in Llanelli. Amongst the original members was David Price, who played an active and direct role in the construction of the original building. The first building cost £600.

== Pastorate of David Price (1843–1878) ==
Soon after, David Price was ordained as the minister at Siloa, and served as its treasurer for many years. Price began life as a working miner, and during the Aberdare Strike of 1857–1858 he appeared on a platform alongside Henry Austin Bruce, translating his comments into Welsh and relating his own experiences as a young miner on strike many years before in an attempt to persuade the miners to return to work. His views reflected the antipathy of nonconformist leaders towards trade unionism at the time.

Siloa was established at the very time when Aberdare was rapidly developing as an industrial settlement as a result of the growth of the steam coal trade. During Price's pastorate, large numbers of migrants, notably from the rural counties of Carmarthenshire, Cardiganshire, Pembrokeshire and Breconshire, stimulated the rapid growth of the membership at Siloa to over 600, making it the most numerous church in the valley in terms of membership by the 1860s. In addition to the membership increase as a result of industrial development, numbers received a considerable boost as a result of the Religious Revival of 1849 and Siloa was rebuilt and enlarged in 1855 at a cost of £719. After the subsequent Religious Revival of 1859, there was another boost in membership and the debts were cleared by 1860.

Siloa played an important role in the rise of political radicalism in the nineteenth century, a movement that was closely connected with nonconformity. In 1848 a notable meeting was held at Siloa, chaired by David Williams (Alaw Goch) to protest against the evidence submitted to the commissioners preparing the 1847 Education Reports by the vicar of Aberdare, John Griffith. Thomas Price, minister of the neighbouring Calfaria, played a prominent part at this meeting.

Several churches were established as branches of Siloa at Price's instigation, including Bethesda, Abernant, where he also served as pastor, and Bryn Seion, Cwmbach. Members of Siloa were also involved with the formation of churches at Mountain Ash, Aberaman, Cwmaman and Cwmdare.

In 1866, the church presented Price with an address and a gift of £170, raised solely by members of the church, in recognition of his services.

Price died in 1878 at the age of 68.

== Pastorate of Silyn Evans (1880–1930) ==
Silyn Evans succeeded David Price and later wrote his biography.

Siloa had 661 members in 1899 and, in the wake of the Religious Revival of 1904–1905, this had increased to 761 by 1907.

Extensive renovations were carried out in 1890 at a cost of £1,100. Jubilee services to celebrate the clearing of the debts incurred by this work were held in January 1905 and coincided with the Revival.

In 1918, there was controversy over a decision by the church to withhold contributions to the Bala-Bangor Theological College owing to the pacifist views of its principal, Thomas Rees.

By 1923 the membership had fallen to 645.

== 20th century ==
Membership at Siloa numbered 501 in 1933 when R. Ifor Parry commenced his ministry. By 1954 the membership had fallen to 363, with a further sharp decline to 1961, when Parry resigned his ministry.

In August 1969, the Reverend Aneurin Owen Roberts became the minister of Siloa. Services continued in Welsh and membership stabilized for some years, especially as families were warmly welcomed and the children were put in charge of one Sunday morning service every month. The Reverend Roberts was the main organizer on the Côr Mawr Caradog Centennial celebrations in October 1972. But the downward trend in chapel membership that was affecting the whole of Wales continued after a while and, from 1980, services have been held in the vestry due to the sharp decline in the number of churchgoers. In contrast to other churches in the valley, however, Siloa continued to function as a Welsh-language church, even after the retirement in 1987 of Reverend Roberts, Siloa's last full-time minister.

== 21st century ==
In March 2020, the chapel closed due to COVID 19 restrictions and in November 2020, the chapel decided not to re-open and the building was sold on.

== Related Reading ==
- Jones, Alan Vernon (2004). Chapels of the Cynon Valley. Cynon Valley Historical Society. ISBN 0953107612.
- Jones, Ieuan Gwynedd (1964). "Dr. Thomas Price and the election of 1868 in Merthyr Tydfil : a study in nonconformist politics (Part One)" (PDF). Welsh History Review. 2 (2): 147–172.
- Rees, D. Ben (1975). Chapels in the Valley. The Ffynnon Press. ISBN 0-902158-08-2.
- Rees, Thomas; Thomas, John (1871). Hanes Eglwysi Annibynnol Cymru, Vol. 2.
