= Abraham Matthews =

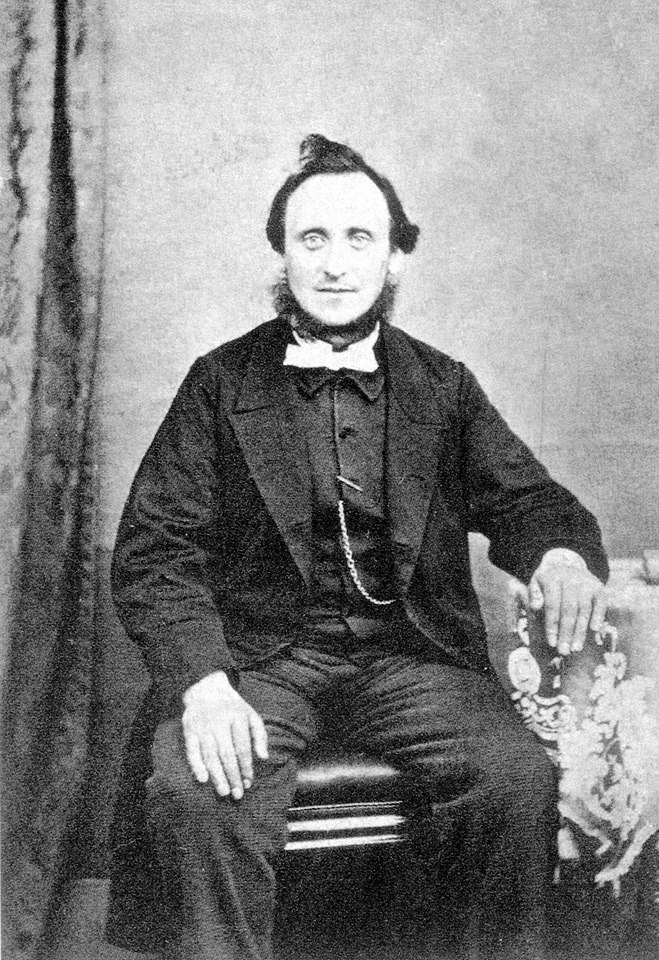
Abraham Matthews

Abraham Matthews (November 1832- 1 April 1899) was a Welsh Independent (Congregationalist) minister and one of the founders of the Welsh settlement in Patagonia.

== Early life ==
He was born at Llanidloes, Montgomeryshire, in November 1832. His parents were John Matthews, a weaver, and Ann Jones, but Abraham was raised by relatives who were farmers. He had little formal education but eventually went to Bala College in his twenties, where he was influenced by Michael D. Jones.

== Ministry in the Aberdare Valley ==
He was ordained at Horeb, Llwydcoed and Elim, Cwmdare in 1859 and remained there until 1865. In that year he gave up his pastorate in order to join the first group of migrants to Patagonia. He was presented with a testimonial at Horeb although some of the members expressed doubts about the venture.

== Abraham Matthews in Patagonia ==
In May 1865, Matthews sailed from Liverpool on the Mimosa and was a member of the first party of Welsh settlers to leave for Patagonia. The ship arrived in South America on 28 July 1865 and the settlers landed at what later became known as Porth Madryn. The settlers had very few resources and Matthews was struck by a serious illness while crossing the prairie between Porth Madryn and the Camwy valley. He was instrumental in persuading the settlers to remain in Patagonia when several of their number sought to abandon the enterprise. For many years he was the leading figure in the Welsh settlement and was known as Esgob y Wladfa (the Bishop of the settlement).

He remained in Patagonia for the rest of his life, although paying several visits to Wales. He died in April 1899. He left a widow, Gwenllian, whom he had married in 1862.
