= Cwmaman =

Former coal mining village in Aberdare, Wales

Coordinates: 51.6833°N 3.4333°W

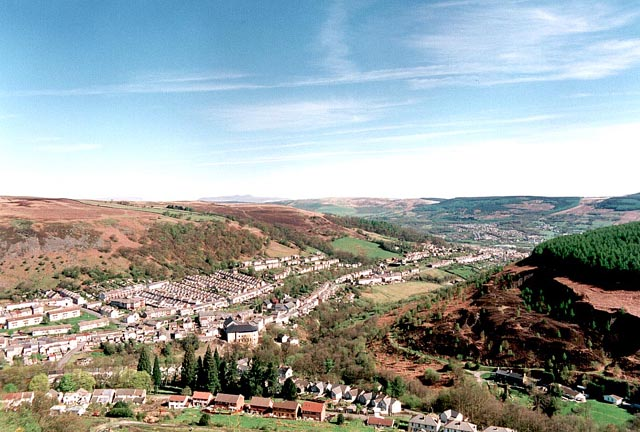
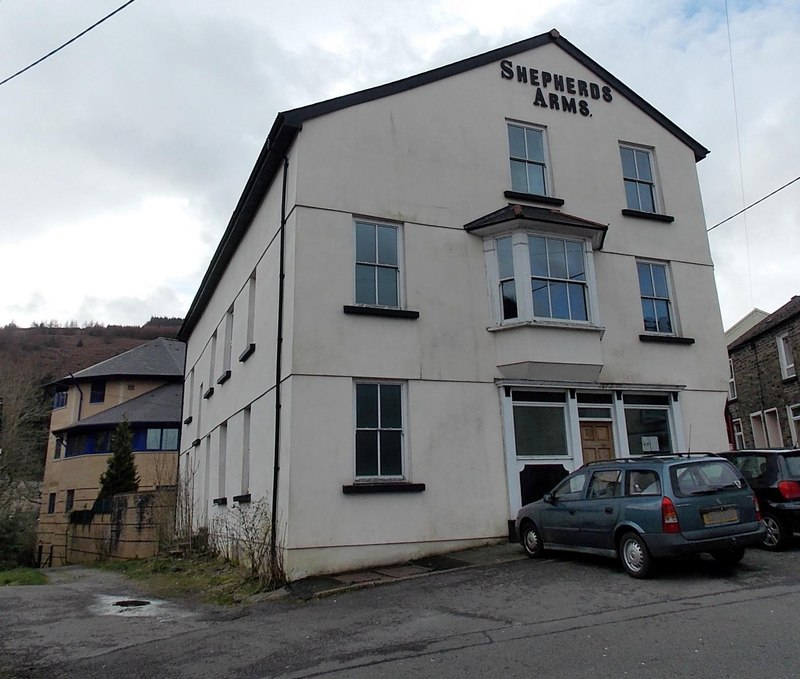
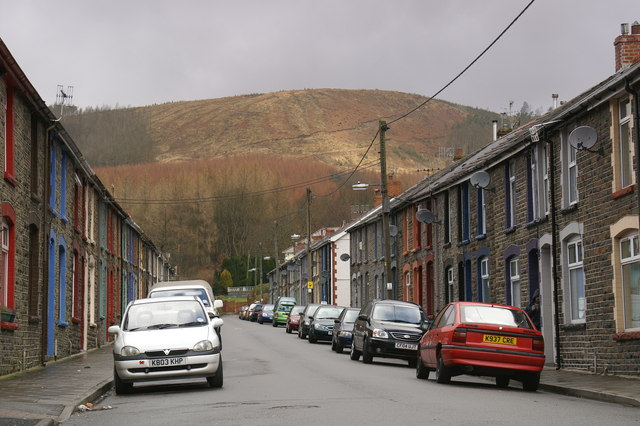
- Aerial View of Cwmaman The Shepherds Arms Glanrhyd Street

- Location within Rhondda Cynon Taf
- Population: 1,000
- Principal area: Rhondda Cynon Taf
- Preserved county: Mid Glamorgan
- Country: Wales
- Sovereign state: United Kingdom
- Post town: ABERDARE
- Postcode district: CF44
- Dialling code: 01685
- Police: South Wales
- Fire: South Wales
- Ambulance: Welsh
- UK Parliament: Merthyr Tydfil and Aberdare

Cwmaman (Welsh pronunciation: [kʊmˈaman]) is a former coal mining village near Aberdare, South Wales. The name is Welsh for "Aman Valley"; the river Aman (a small tributary of the River Cynon) flows through the village. There are several hills nearby, such as Pen Foel Aman and Mynydd y Ffaldau. Within the village, there are three children's playgrounds and playing fields. Above the village there are several reservoirs accessible from several footpaths along the river.

== History ==
Cwmaman was a well-known coal-mining village which at one time boasted several collieries. Until the 19th century, the area was virtually uninhabited, with around 40 farm workers living in and around the community by 1841. By the end of the 1840s, the first coal pits were sunk and Cwmaman began to transform into a thriving industrial settlement. In the late 19th century Cwmaman housed the workers in five surrounding coal mines: the Fforchaman, Fforchneol, Bedwlwyn, Cwmneol, and the Cwmaman. Cwmaman Colliery was also known as Shepherd's Pit, in honour of its founder Thomas Shepherd, a name it shares with the village's first public house, the Shepherd's Arms, which was opened in 1850.

There is a small series of parallel streets in the eastern part of the village, such as Burns Street and Spencer Street, along with the other streets collectively known as "Poets' Corner".

== Culture ==
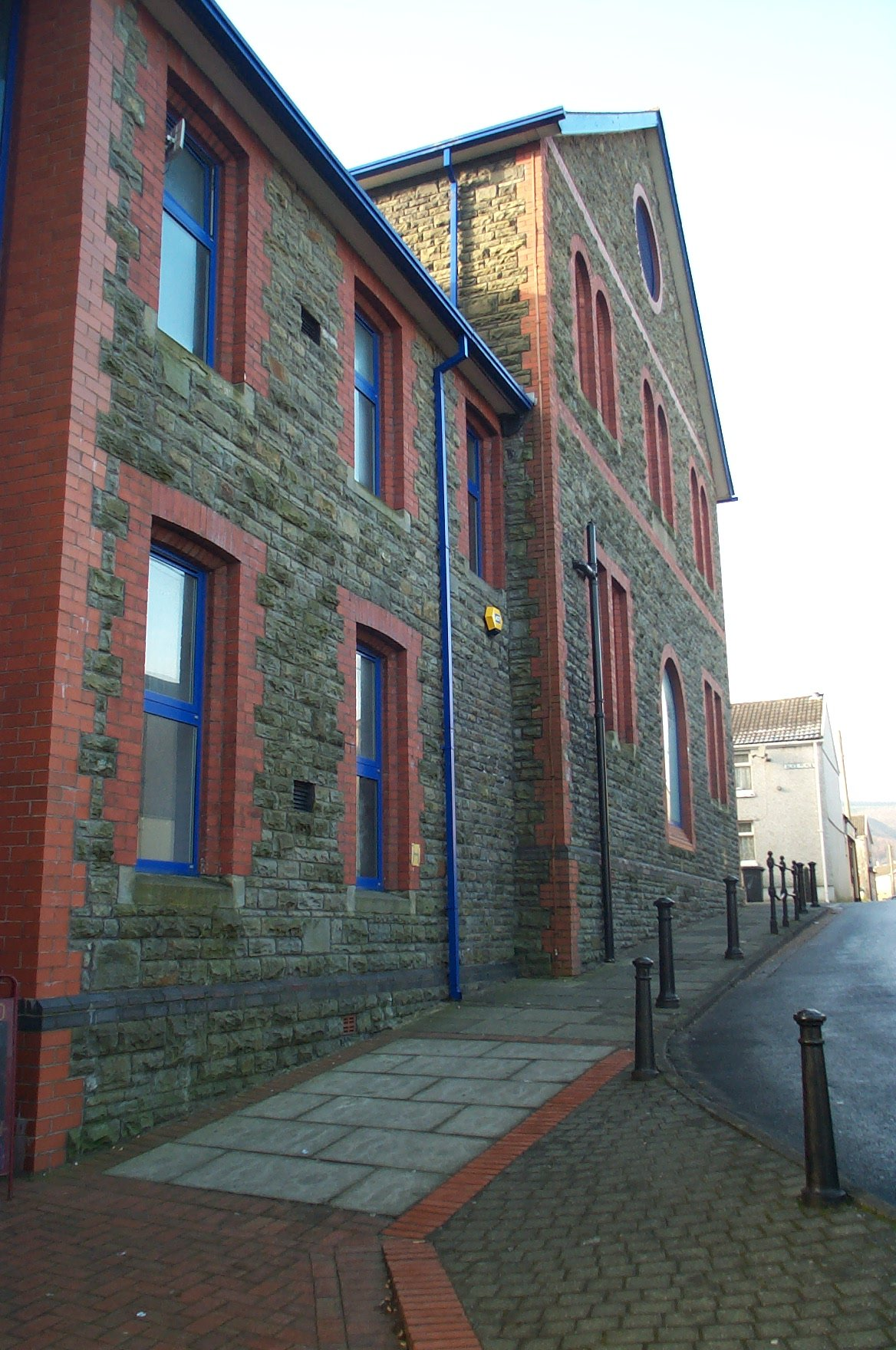
Cwmaman Public Hall and Institute

The band Stereophonics comes from Cwmaman. On 14 December 2007, in association with Jo Whiley and her BBC Radio 1 Live Lounge Tour, the band returned to Cwmaman to play an exclusive acoustic gig at the Cwmaman Working Men's Club, the venue where the band first performed.

The village is home to the war poet Alun Lewis, and a plaque in Llanwonno Road marks the house where he lived. Born in 1915, Lewis was strongly influenced by his formative years in the depression-era valley. He was also influenced by local issues of his community in the then-called Aberdare Leader, and this is demonstrated in his poem "The Mountain over Aberdare", which touches on the desperate poverty that beset the Cynon Valley and the country in this period. However, it was for his war poems, published in two volumes, Raiders Dawn and Ha! Ha! Among the Trumpets, that Lewis's reputation was made. The village's Cwrt Alun Lewis flats are named in his honour.

Cwmaman Public Hall & Institute is a community-owned enterprise consisting of a concert room, theatre / cinema and fitness suite

St. Joseph's Church was renovated in 2007. This work included the installation of solar panels on one side of its roof with the aim to sell back energy to the National Grid.

The Cwmaman Music Festival is held at the last weekend of September every year. It started in 2008 and has attracted artists such as Alabama 3, Mike Peters, Killing for Company and many unsigned artists from around the Cynon Valley.

== Religion ==
Religion played a central role in the life of the village until the second half of the 20th century. Seion, a Welsh Baptist chapel, remained an active place of worship until its closure for financial reasons in 2013. The congregation still meets at the former Moriah Aman Congregational Chapel, now an evangelical church. The third Welsh language chapel in the village was Soar, a Calvinistic Methodist church which closed in the late 1980s and was later demolished.

Cwmaman was particularly affected by the Religious Revival of 1904-05 which had an impact throughout the Cynon Valley. In January 1905 it was reported that meetings were being held every evening at the various chapels and a number of secular organisations had abandoned their meetings for the time being. Later that month, another report stated that outdoor meetings were being held in relation to the revival, and that prayer meetings were being held in the mornings at Cwmaman Colliery.

== Regeneration and the community ==
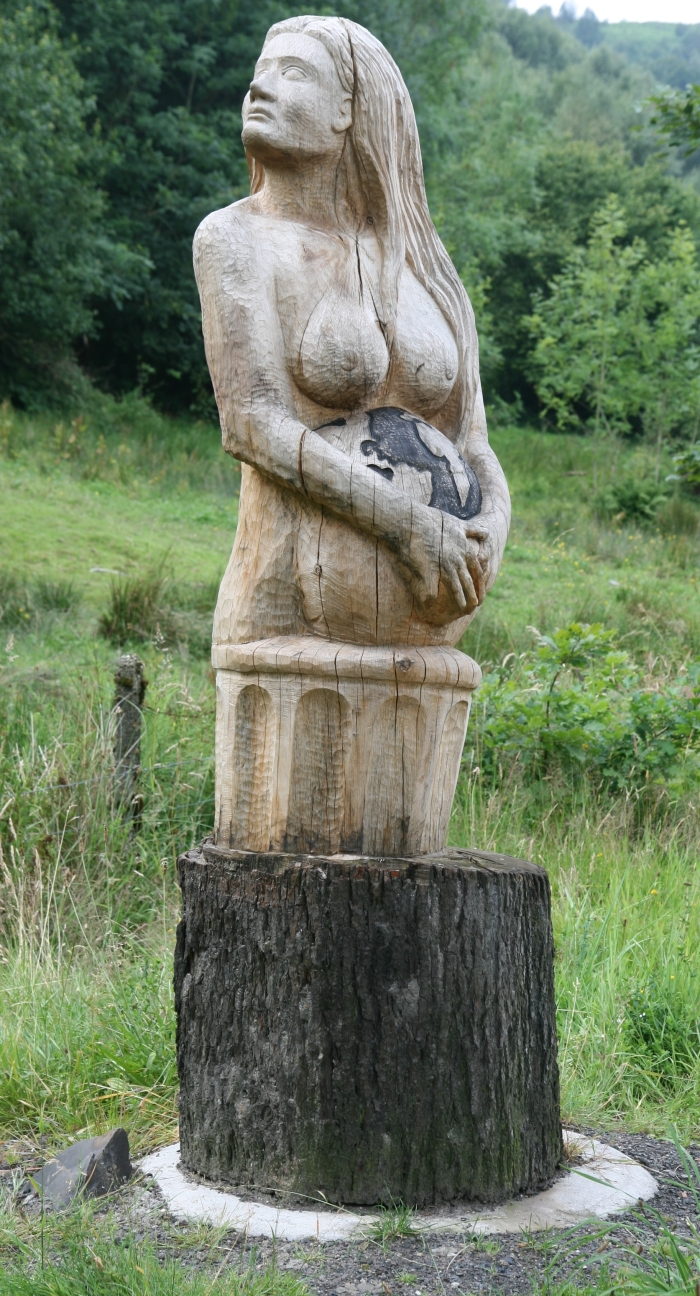
Fragile Earth by Paul Clarke

Cwmaman was a Communities First area, officially recognised as needing Welsh Assembly support to assist the community solve problems of social disadvantage.

The Cwmaman Communities First Partnership was established in October 2001 aiming to bring individuals, voluntary groups and public and private sector organisations in the community together to help create a better future for the area.

Many innovative environmental projects have taken place including the hosting of an environmental festival centred on St Joseph's Church, holding a sculpture exhibition, the development of a community woodland walk, and establishing a Cwmaman Sculpture Trail.

A range of sculptors have contributed to projects in the village, including Robert Koenig, Dai Edwards, Tom Harvey, Godfrey Phillips, Paul Clarke, Dave Lloyd, Dominic Claire and Peter Boyd.

On 25 September 2018, scenes for the third series of the historical drama The Crown were filmed in Cwmaman. Local children were asked to volunteer as extras for the scenes, and many houses and Glynhafod Junior School were used as significant parts of the sets for the scenes filmed.

== Politics ==
Cwmaman was a traditional Labour Party stronghold, although in more recent times it has been challenged by Plaid Cymru and the Cynon Valley Party. It lies in the Aberaman South electoral ward, currently represented by Councillor Tina Williams (Labour).

== Notable people ==
- Alun Lewis (1915–1944) – poet
- Ron Jones (born 1934) – sprinter
- Tyrone O'Sullivan (1945-2023) – Chairman of Tower Colliery, lived in Cwmaman for many years
- John Derrick (1963–2017) – cricketer
- Stuart Cable (1970–2010) – broadcaster and drummer with rock band Stereophonics
- Kelly Jones (born 1974) – Stereophonics lead singer
- Richard Jones (born 1974) – Stereophonics bassist
