= Cwmbach =

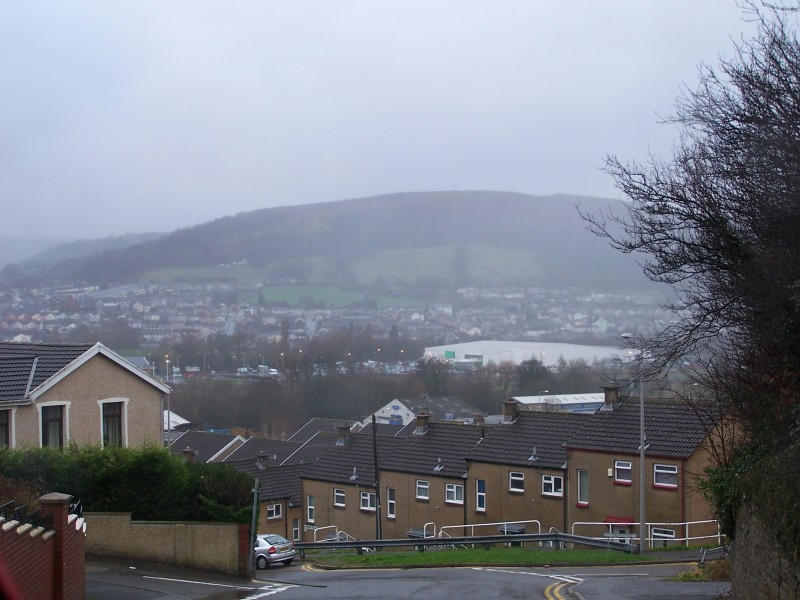
- View from Cwmbach: Wales' first Co-Operative store was opened in this street

- Location within Rhondda Cynon Taf
- Population: 5,117 (Mid-2017 Estimate)
- Principal area: Rhondda Cynon Taf
- Preserved county: Mid Glamorgan
- Country: Wales
- Sovereign state: United Kingdom
- Post town: ABERDARE
- Postcode district: CF44
- Dialling code: 01685
- Police: South Wales
- Fire: South Wales
- Ambulance: Welsh
- UK Parliament: Merthyr Tydfil and Aberdare
- Senedd Cymru – Welsh Parliament: Cynon Valley
- List of places UK Wales Rhondda Cynon Taf 51.707222°N 3.412778°W Community map: Map of the community

Cwmbach is a village and community (and electoral ward) near Aberdare, in the county borough of Rhondda Cynon Taf, Wales. Cwmbach means 'Little Valley' in Welsh (Cwm = valley, Bach = little). Cwmbach has a population of 5,117 (mid-2017 estimate).

Prior to the industrial revolution, Cwmbach consisted of a number of farms and homesteads; in the early to mid-19th century it became a significant coal mining community.

== History ==
There is evidence of inhabitation in the Cwmbach area since prehistoric times, with the mountains above Cwmbach littered with earthworks, and cairns of a religious, rituary and funerary type. Five of these are registered with Cadw. The Craig-y-Gilfach earthwork is ideally situated at the top of the mountain, giving protection from both the Cynon and Merthyr valleys.

Despite its early inhabitation, Cwmbach like most of the Cynon Valley was a quiet isolated area made up of farms and homesteads before the coming of industry. Its rural calm was first disturbed by the building of the Aberdare canal which opened in May 1812, with traffic passing through the area now known as Cwmbach in order to reach the canal head further to the north or join with the Glamorganshire canal to the south. Originally opened for trade with the iron industry of the Aberdare region, the canal found itself ideally situated when in 1837 the first deep pit was sunk at Abernant-y-Groes Colliery (later known as Cwmbach colliery). A further pit was later sunk and named Lletyshenkin Colliery. All coal was subsequently exported via the canal and train systems to Cardiff Docks. The location of Cwmbach pit is today marked by an RCT Heritage Trail plaque at Pit Place.

Within the space of only a few years there were horrific explosions. At Cwmbach pit in 1846 28 miners were killed, followed by the deaths within three weeks of four others who had been seriously injured in the incident. At Lletty Shenkin colliery in 1849 there were 53 deaths. At Cwmbach colliery there were two deaths in 1852 and at Lletty-shenkyn colliery there were five deaths in 1853 and two in 1862.

The Lletty Shenkin explosion of 1849, in particular, led to demands by the local middle classes in Aberdare for improved safety in the mines. Steam coal mines were particularly susceptible to explosions and prominent figures such as Thomas Price, called for the introduction of mines' inspectors who would visit collieries on a regular basis, at least once a month, to carry out inspections. This policy was, however, opposed by the miners who demanded that the inspections be carried out by experienced colliers. As a result, little happened for many years.

As the collieries expanded so did the village of Cwmbach. However, the closures of the pits (the final colliery Lletty Shenkin closed in 1922) resulted in high emigration and poverty. In the 1950s Cwmbach prospered with a large number of new council houses that were built at the lower end of Cwmbach and to the south. This housing stock was transferred to RCT Homes in 2010 a private not for profit social housing provider.

The 1950s also brought building on the site of the former Pant Farm; these were all private houses made of up houses and bungalows.

Today's Cwmbach is a mixture of both social and private housing. An area known as Tirfounder Fields was cleared and building work started in 2001 for a retail park.

In Cwmbach, the first Cooperative society shop in Wales was established in 1860 in Bridge Road. The building was demolished in 1977.

== Governance ==
Cwmbach is also the name of an electoral ward with boundaries coterminous with the community. The ward elects two county borough councillors to Rhondda Cynon Taf County Borough Council.

== Culture and Cwmbach Male Choir ==
The Cwmbach Male Choir was formed in 1921 and were the first choir to sing at Cardiff Arms Park prior to an international rugby match. Local history being that they were formed at a local cricket match held in June 1921. A number of the crowd watching the game became uninterested in the play and began to sing hymns and part songs. This led to the suggestion that a male choir be formed. From this a meeting was held at the Cwmbach Hall and Institute and the Cwmbach Male Choir became a reality. The choir has shared a concert platform with some world-famous artists, including Paul Robeson, Sir Geraint Evans, Stuart Burrows, Dame Gwyneth Jones, Constance Shacklock, Patricia Kern and the internationally renowned guitarist John Williams.

The poet Harri Webb lived in Cwmbach for a number of years (until the mid-1990s).

== Places of worship ==
Situated on Bridge Road is St. Mary Magdalene's. This is a Church in Wales church at the heart of the community and is over 130 years old. It has undergone a £140,000 restoration, replacing the roof and re-hanging a bell which had been missing for 15 years. During the works, services were held at the Church Hall next door.

Cornerstone Church on Sion Terrace is an Evangelical church, but is also home to the Cornerstone Project, delivering classes, youth activities and training to the local population.

Bethania Baptist chapel was badly damaged by wartime bombing in 1941 but was subsequently restored. However, the chapel closed in the 1980s and was demolished in 1995.

== Schools ==
Cwmbach has two schools, Cwmbach Community Primary School and Cwmbach Church in Wales School. Both schools provide education facilities for nursery, infant and junior ages.

== Sports ==
Cwmbach is home to two football teams, Cwmbach Royal Stars and Royal Oak.

== Community buildings ==
Cwmbach had a police station and this was used as a base by the local community police, however, this has been closed & made into residential dwellings as of at least 2024. The station was not listed by South Wales Police as it has no service counter but was open to the public when police officers were working.

The small Cwmbach Library was located on Morgan Row, but closed in 2014. There were plans for its demolition and five houses to be built on the site.

== Wildlife ==
Parts of Ynys Cynon and Tirfounder Fields are defined as S.I.N.C. (Sites of Importance for Nature Conservation) and support a wide variety of birds, insects and plants. Some notable examples are otter, mink, kingfisher, dipper, willow tit, bogbean, lesser water plantain, six dragonfly species and a variety of wading birds and summer migrants.

== Bibliography ==
- Jones, Alan Vernon (2004). Chapels of the Cynon Valley. Cynon Valley Historical Society. ISBN 0953107612.
- Jones, Ieuan Gwynedd (1964). "Dr. Thomas Price and the election of 1868 in Merthyr Tydfil : a study in nonconformist politics (Part One)" (PDF). Welsh History Review. 2 (2): 147–172.
