= William Williams (Carw Coch) =

Welsh literary figure, born 1808

William Williams (6 March 1808 – 26 September 1872), known by his bardic name, Carw Coch (literally Red Stag), was a prominent literary figure in Aberdare, and south Wales generally, during the mid-nineteenth century, and an important figure in the development of the eisteddfod movement. His bardic name was derived from the Stag Inn, the public house that he ran at Trecynon, Aberdare.

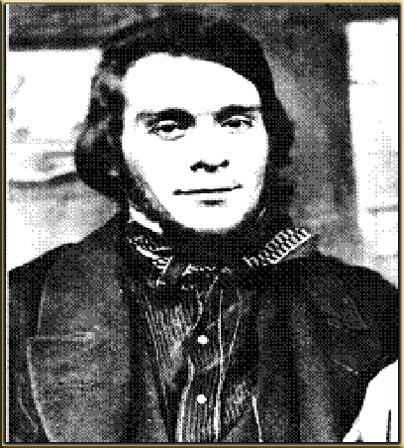
William Williams (Carw Coch)

Williams was born on 6 March 1808 near Aberpergwm in the Vale of Neath, the son of Noah and Joan Williams, who attended the Unitarian chapel at Blaengwrach. At a young age he moved to Tredegar, and later to Llwydcoed, Aberdare, where, in 1832, he married, raised a family, and spent the rest of his life running the Stag Inn.

He first became politically active during the time of the Chartists and contributed to their Welsh journal, Udgorn Cymru. At this time, he was also a member of a society known as the 'Free Enquirers' at Aberdare.

In 1841, Williams held the first of many eisteddfodau at the Stag, and a friendly society known as the 'Cymreigyddion of the Carw Coch' was established. Amongst those associated with this movement was David Williams (Alaw Goch), the Rev. Thomas Price of Calfaria Chapel, Aberdare and many other local poets and writers. The Carw Coch eisteddfod continued for many years and many of the compositions published in a volume known as Gardd Aberdâr (1853 onwards).

Williams was a staunch Unitarian, a leading member of Hen-Dy-Cwrdd at Trecynon and a contributor to their journal, Yr Ymofynydd. He was also one of the founders of the newspaper Y Gwladgarwr ( 1857–83) and wrote a regular column for the paper until his death.

During the 1868 General Election he played a peripheral role in the campaign of Henry Richard and sought assurances at a meeting held at Ebenezer, Trecynon that Richard supported the reform of the House of Lords.

Williams died on 26 September 1872, and was buried at St Fagan's, Aberdare. His son, Lewis Noah Williams (Ap Carw Coch) became a leading public figure and a member of the Aberdare Urban District Council.
