= David Williams (coal owner) =

Welsh businessman (1809-1863)

David Williams (12 July 1809 – 28 February 1863), known by his bardic name Alaw Goch, was a prominent coal-owner in the Aberdare valley and also a keen supporter of Welsh culture and the eisteddfod.

== Early life ==
Williams was born on 12 July 1809 at Llwyn Drain in the parish of Ystradowen, near Cowbridge, Glamorgan. When he was around twelve years old he moved to Aberdare with his parents and after working as a sawyer, his father's trade, at the ironworks at Abernant, he became involved in coal-mining and appears to have been one of a small group of miners who struck upon a rich vein of coal at Ynysgynon. In 1837 he married Ann Morgan at St John's Church, Aberdare and they had a son, Gwilym.

Williams was a self-made man, in a similar mould to another native Welsh coal owner, David Davis, Blaengwawr His first venture was at Ynysgynon in the 1840s, in partnership initially with one Lewis Lewis. This was a successful venture and he soon opened another colliery at Aberaman, generally known as 'Williams's Pit' having obtained a lease from Crawshay Bailey. His next venture was the Deep Duffryn colliery at Mountain Ash, which he eventually sold to John Nixon for £42,000. With this money he again sank another colliery at Cwmdare in 1853, and, after a further success, he again sold out. In this way he became a wealthy man, owning land at Llanwonno, Trealaw, which is named after him, and Miskin Manor.

== Cultural interests ==
Williams became a wealthy man, but continued to interact with working class. It was said of him that 'many a man who had plied the mandril, side by side with him could claim him as a close friend to the hour of his death'. He was a generous sponsor of Welsh culture, involved in early attempts to establish a 'gorsedd', and conducting and sometimes adjudicating at local eisteddfodau. A number of these were held in the Aberdare district. He was himself an amateur poet, publishing under his pseudonym, Alaw Goch. He was a prominent sponsor of the movement to establish the national eisteddfod alternately in North and South Wales. In 1861, Williams was the leading figure in arranging a National Eisteddfod at Aberdare, an important milestone in its development as an all-Wales festival.

He was also involved with the establishment of the Gwladgarwr newspaper at Aberdare in 1858, which became for a time the most popular newspaper among the miners of south Wales more generally.

== Industrial relations ==
Williams was regarded as a conciliator, seeking to bridge the gulf between masters and men. In due course, however, he found himself at odds with his employees, most notably during the bitter Aberdare Strike during the winter of 1857–8.

== Politics ==
His involvement with politics, both locally and wider afield, was far more limited than a number of his contemporaries. He did, however, take the chair at the public meeting held in February 1848 at Siloa, Aberdare to protest against the evidence given by the vicar of Aberdare, John Griffith to the commissioners preparing the 1847 Education Reports. This episode proved to be a notable milestone in the political life of the valley. His comments at this meeting, however, reveal the limits to the radicalism of Alaw Goch, in that he was fiercely critical of the Chartists and considered those attempts to establish trade unions in the valley as being the work of outsiders from England. He was also actively involved in the British School movement and chaired the public meeting to mark the opening of the first such school at Aberdare, known as Ysgol y Comin in 1848.

Williams died suddenly at Bridgend on 28 February 1863. On the day of the funeral, according to one local correspondent, 'our town presented quite a sombre appearance. The shops were-closed, St. Elvan's bell tolled solemnly, and a gloomy feeling seemed to pervade the masses of people who loitered in the streets, anticipating with melancholy eagerness the arrival of the remains of the departed bard and patriot.' He was buried in the Aberdare cemetery.
