= Aberdare =

Town in Rhondda Cynon Taf, Wales

Coordinates: 51.713°N 3.445°W

Aberdare: Welsh: Aberdâr; Queen of the Hills Athens of Wales
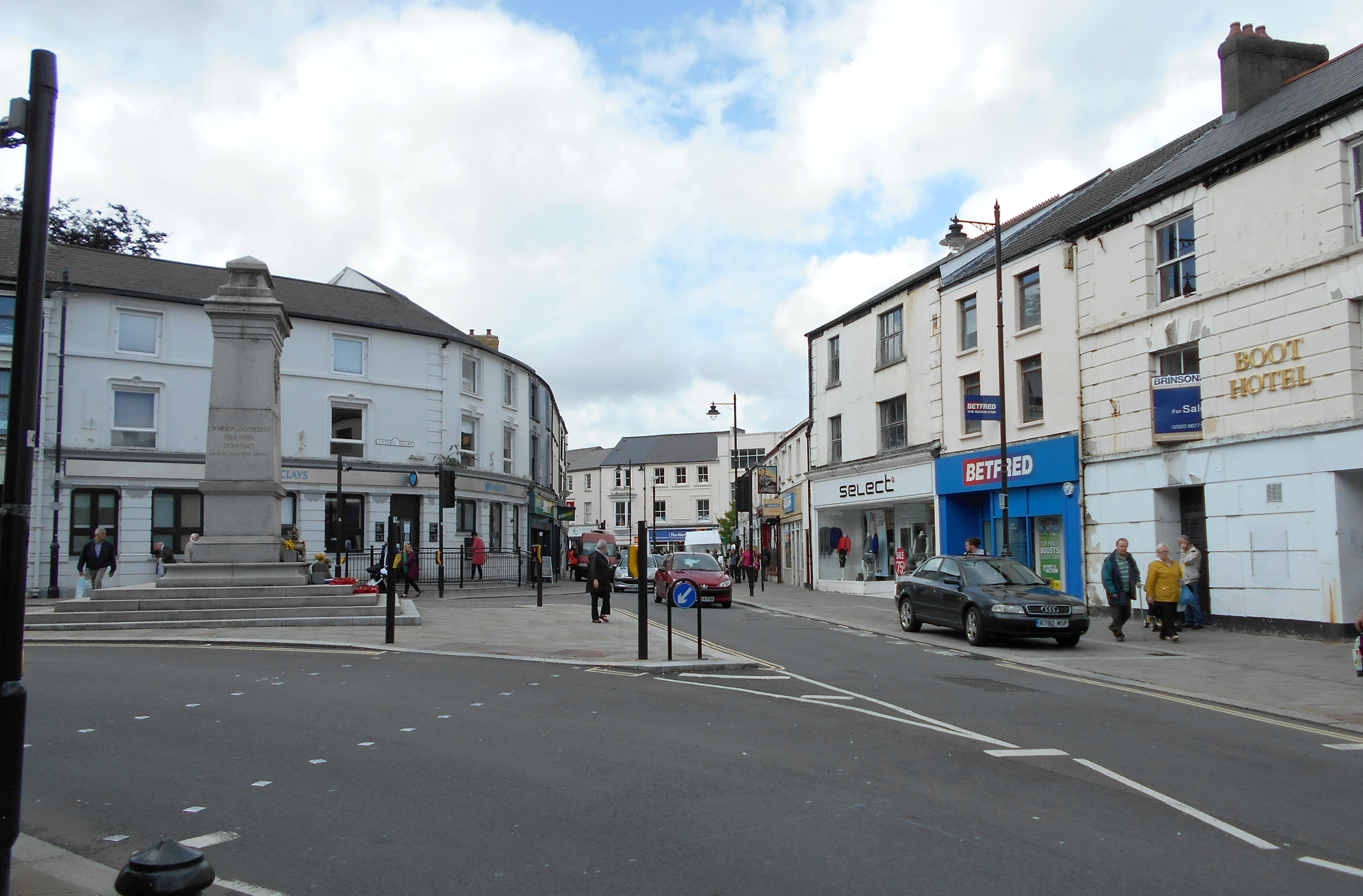
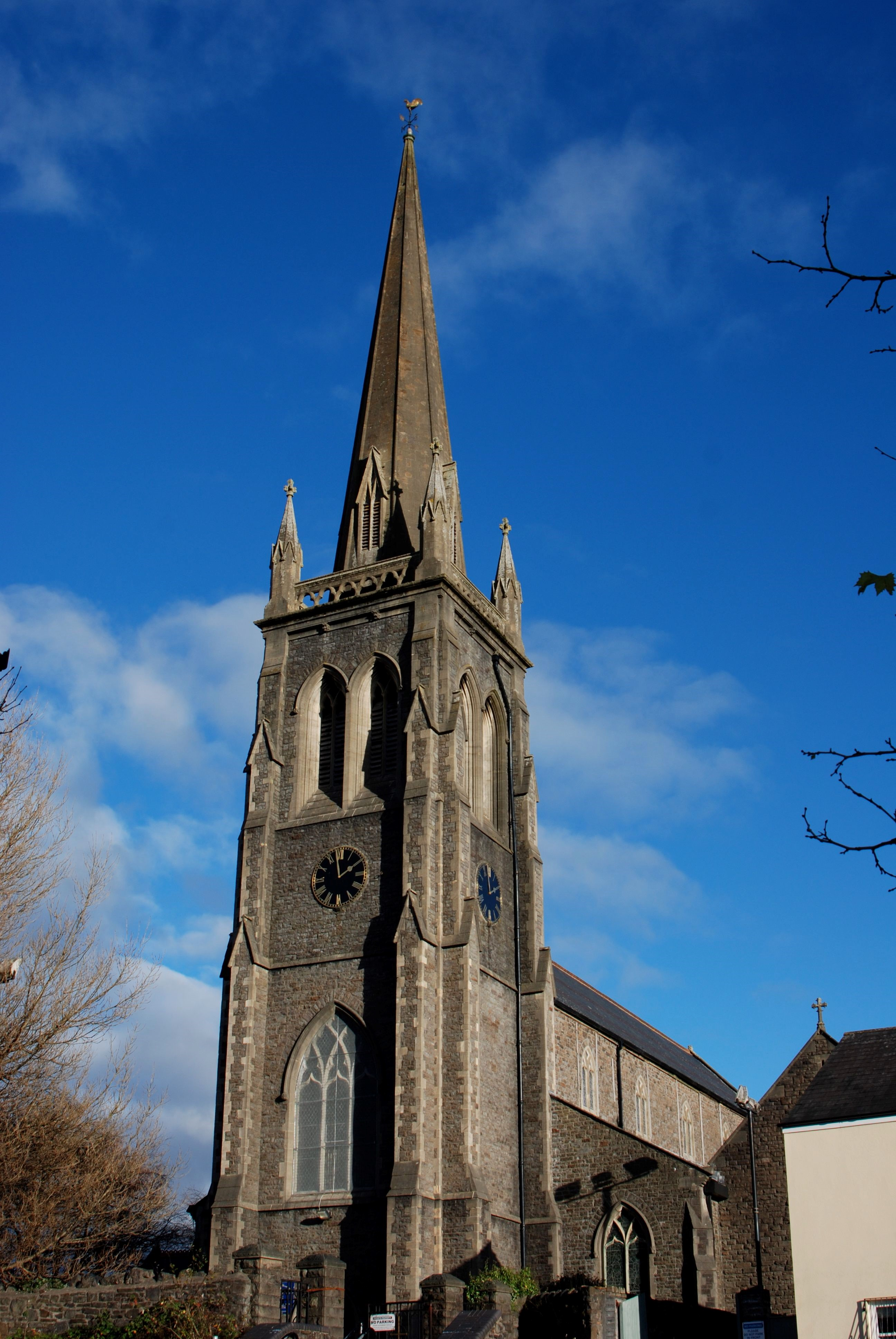
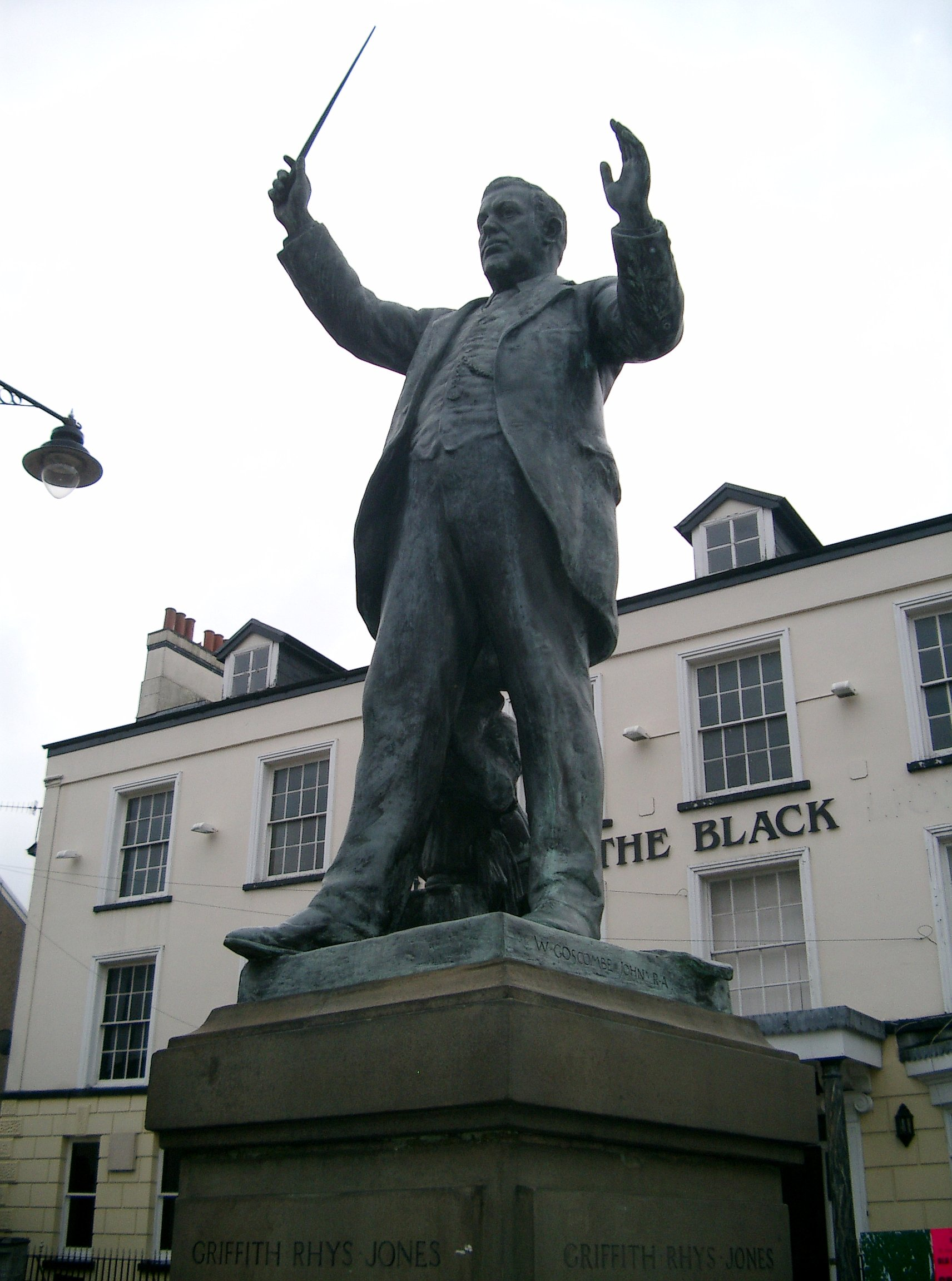
- From the top, Aberdare Town Centre, St. Elvan's Church, Statue of Caradog

- Location within Rhondda Cynon Taf
- Population: 39,550 (Mid-2017 Estimate)
- OS grid reference: SO005025
- Principal area: Rhondda Cynon Taf
- Preserved county: Mid Glamorgan
- Country: Wales
- Sovereign state: United Kingdom
- Post town: ABERDARE
- Postcode district: CF44
- Dialling code: 01685
- Police: South Wales
- Fire: South Wales
- Ambulance: Welsh
- UK Parliament: Merthyr Tydfil and Aberdare
- Senedd Cymru – Welsh Parliament: Pontypridd Cynon Merthyr

Aberdare (/ˌæbərˈdɛər/ ab-ər-DAIR; Welsh: Aberdâr) is a town in the Cynon Valley area of Rhondda Cynon Taf, Wales, at the confluence of the Rivers Dare (Dâr) and Cynon. Aberdare has a population of 39,550 (mid-2017 estimate). Aberdare is 4 miles (6 km) south-west of Merthyr Tydfil, 20 miles (32 km) north-west of Cardiff and 22 miles (35 km) east-north-east of Swansea. During the 19th century it became a thriving industrial settlement, which was also notable for the vitality of its cultural life and as an important publishing centre.

== Etymology ==
The name Aberdare means "mouth/confluence of the river Dare", as the town is located where the Dare river (Welsh: Afon Dâr) meets the Cynon (Welsh: Afon Cynon). While the town's Welsh spelling uses formal conventions, the English spelling of the name reflects the town's pronunciation in the local Gwenhwyseg dialect of South East Wales.

Dâr is an archaic Welsh word for oaks (derwen is the singulative), and the valley was noted for its large and fine oaks as late as the 19th century. In ancient times, the river may have been associated with Daron, an ancient Celtic goddess of oak. As such, the town would share an etymology with Aberdaron and the Daron river. As with many Welsh toponyms, it is likely that the locality was known by this name long before the development of the town.

== History ==
=== Early history ===
There are several cairns and the remains of a circular British encampment on the mountain between Aberdare and Merthyr. This may have led to the mountain itself being named Bryn-y-Beddau (hill of graves) although other local traditions associate the name with the Battle of Hirwaun Wrgant.

=== Middle Ages ===
Aberdare lies within the commote (cwmwd) of Meisgyn, in the cantref of Penychen. The area is traditionally given as the scene of the battle of Hirwaun Wrgant, where the allied forces of the Norman Robert Fitzhamon and Iestyn ap Gwrgant, the last Welsh prince of Glamorgan, defeated Rhys ap Tewdwr, prince of Dyfed. The battle is thought to have started at Aberdare, with the areas now known as Upper and Lower Gadlys (The battle Court(s)), traditionally given as each armies' headquarters.

The settlement of Aberdare dates from at least this period, with the first known reference being in a monastic chapter of 1203 concerning grazing right on Hirwaun Common. It was originally a small village in an agricultural district, centred around the Church of St John the Baptist, said to date from at least 1189. By the middle of the 15th century, Aberdare contained a water mill in addition to a number of thatched cottages, of which no evidence remains.

=== Industrial Aberdare ===
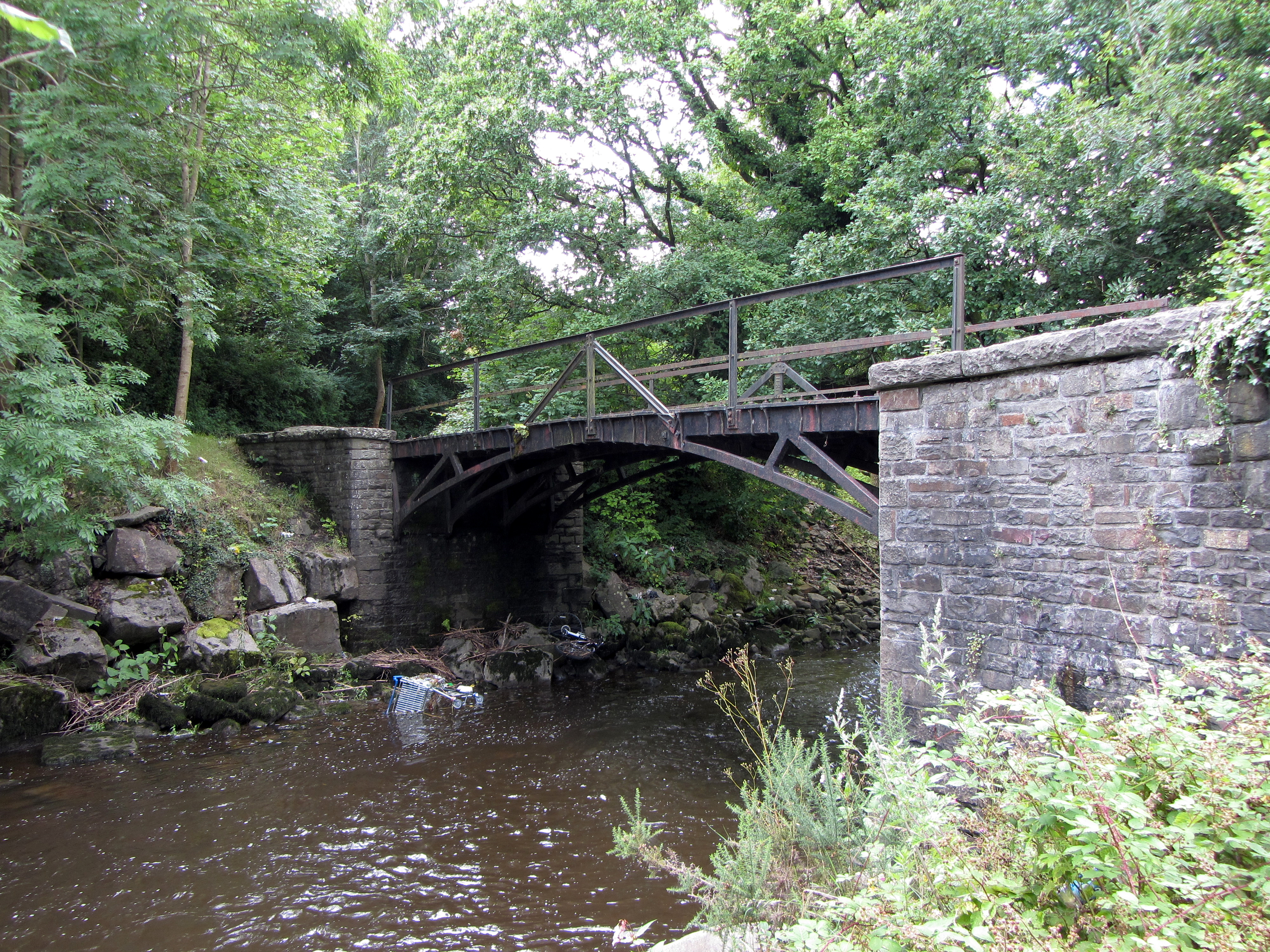
The Iron Bridge built by the Aberdare Canal Company around 1811 to carry the tramway that ran from Hirwaun to the canal head at Cwmbach. It is one of the oldest surviving railway bridges in the world.

Aberdare grew rapidly in the early 19th century through two major industries: first iron, then coal. A branch of the Glamorganshire Canal (1811) was opened to transport these products; then the railway became the main means of transport to the South Wales coast. From the 1870s onwards, the economy of the town was dominated by the coal mining industry, with only a small tinplate works. There were also several brickworks and breweries. During the latter half of the 19th century, considerable improvements were made to the town, which became a pleasant place to live, despite the nearby collieries. A postgraduate theological college opened in connection with the Church of England in 1892, but in 1907 it moved to Llandaff.

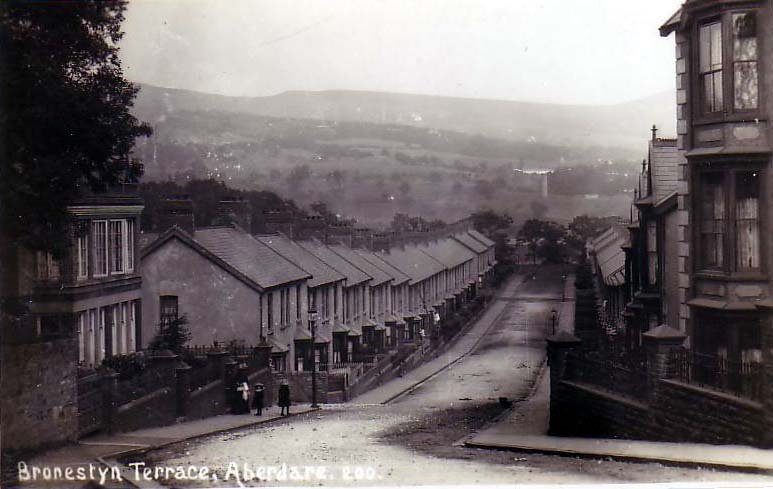
Aberdare in the 1910s

With the ecclesiastical parishes of St Fagan's (Trecynon) and Aberaman carved out of the ancient parish, Aberdare had 12 Anglican churches and one Catholic church, built in 1866 in Monk Street near the site of a cell attached to Penrhys monastery; and at one time there were over 50 Nonconformist chapels (including those in surrounding settlements such as Cwmaman and Llwydcoed). The services in the majority of the chapels were in Welsh. Most of these chapels have now closed, with many converted to other uses. The former urban district included what were once the separate villages of Aberaman, Abernant, Cwmaman, Cwmbach, Cwmdare, Llwydcoed, Penywaun and Trecynon.

== Population growth ==
In 1801, the population of the parish of Aberdare was just 1,486. The early 19th century saw rapid industrial growth, initially because of the ironworks and later because of the combined iron and steam coal industries. By the 1840s the parish population was increasing by 1,000 people every year, almost exclusively migrant workers from west Wales, which was suffering from an agricultural depression. This growth was increasingly concentrated in the previously agricultural areas of Blaengwawr and Cefnpennar to the south of the town. The population of the Aberdare District (centred on the town) was 9,322 in 1841, 18,774 in 1851, and 37,487 in 1861.

Despite a small decline in the 1870s, population levels continued to increase. In 1881, the population of the Aberdare Registration District was 33,804, which rose to 38,513 by 1891, and to 43,365 by 1901. The first decade of the 20th century saw a notably sharp increase, largely as a result of the steam coal trade, reaching 53,779 in 1911. The population has since declined owing to the loss of most of the heavy industry.

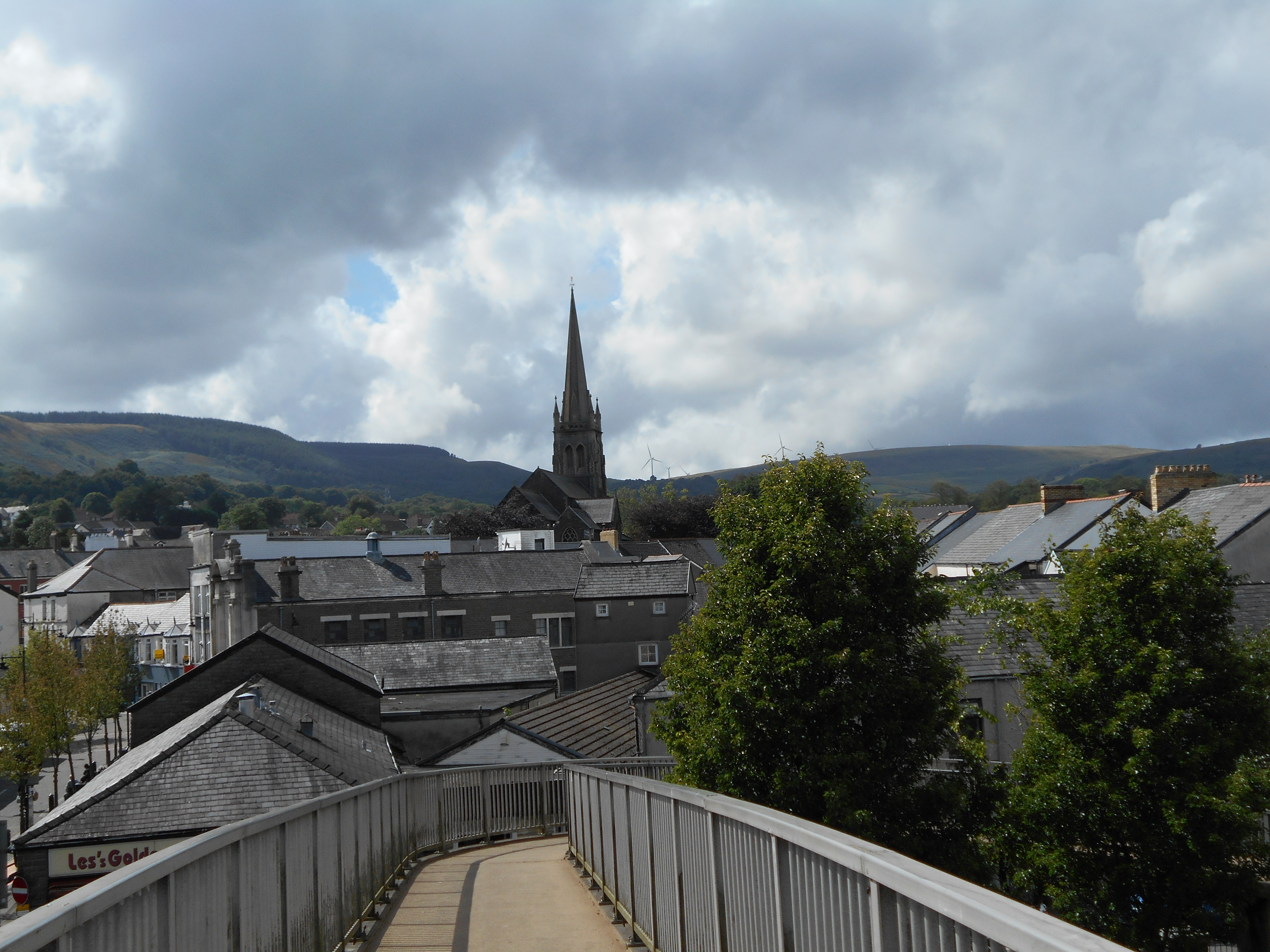
Aberdare skyline in 2015

The Aberdare population at the 2001 census was 31,705 (ranked 13th largest in Wales). By 2011 it was 29,748, though the figure includes the surrounding populations of Aberaman, Abercwmboi, Cwmbach and Llwydcoed.

== Language ==
Welsh was the prominent language until the mid 20th century and Aberdare was an important centre of Welsh language publishing. A large proportion of the early migrant population were Welsh speaking, and in 1851 only ten per cent of the population had been born outside of Wales.

In his controversial evidence to the 1847 Inquiry into the State of Education in Wales (the report of which is known in Wales as the Brad y Llyfrau Gleision, Treason of the Blue Books), the Anglican vicar of Aberdare, John Griffith, stated that the English language was "generally understood" and referred to the arrival of people from anglicised areas such as Radnorshire and south Pembrokeshire. Griffith also made allegations about the Welsh-speaking population and what he considered to be the degraded character of the women of Aberdare, alleging sexual promiscuity was an accepted social convention, that drunkenness and improvidence amongst the miners was common and attacking what he saw as exaggerated emotion in the religious practices of the Nonconformists.

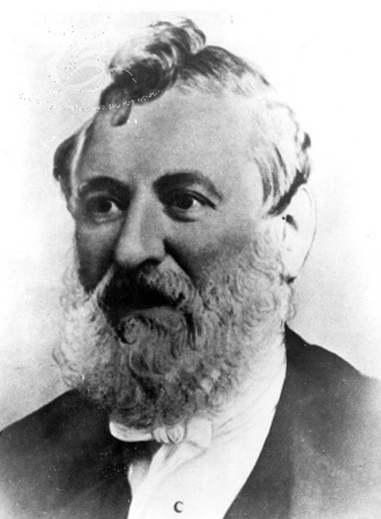
Rev Thomas Price (1820–88), minister of Capel Calfaria

This evidence helped inform the findings of the report which would go on to stigmatise Welsh people as "ignorant", "lazy" and "immoral" and found the reason for this was the continued use of the Welsh language, which it described as "evil". The controversial reports allowed the local nonconformist minister Thomas Price of Calfaria to arrange public meetings, from which he would emerge as a leading critic of the vicar's evidence and, by implication, a defender of both the Welsh language and the morality of the local population. It is still contended that Griffiths was made vicar of Merthyr in the neighbouring valley to escape local anger, even though it was over ten years before he left Aberdare. The reports and subsequent defence would maintain the perceptions of Aberdare, the Cynon Valley and even the wider area as proudly nonconformist and defiantly Welsh speaking throughout its industrialised history.

By 1901, the census recorded that 71.5% of the population of Aberdare Urban District spoke Welsh, but this fell to 65.2% in 1911. The 1911 data shows that Welsh was more widely spoken among the older generation compared to the young, and amongst women compared to men. A shift in language was expedited with the loss of men during the First World War and the resulting economic turmoil. English gradually began to replace Welsh as the community language, as shown by the decline of the Welsh language press in the town. This pattern continued after the Second World War despite the advent of Welsh medium education. Ysgol Gymraeg Aberdâr, the Welsh-medium primary school, was established in the 1950s with Idwal Rees as head teacher.

According to the 2011 Census, 11.6% of Aberdare residents aged three years and over could speak Welsh, with 24.8% of 3- to 15-year-olds stating that they could speak it.

== Industry ==
=== Iron industry ===
Ironworks were established at Llwydcoed and Abernant in 1799 and 1800 respectively, followed by others at Gadlys and Aberaman in 1827 and 1847. The iron industry began to expand in a significant way around 1818 when the Crawshay family of Merthyr purchased the Hirwaun ironworks and placed them under independent management. In the following year, Rowland Fothergill took over the ironworks at Abernant and a few years later did the same at Llwydcoed. Both concerns later fell into the hands of his nephew Richard Fothergill. The Gadlys Ironworks was established in 1827 by Matthew Wayne, who had previously managed the Cyfarthfa ironworks at Merthyr. The Gadlys works, now considered an important archaeological site, originally comprised four blast furnaces, inner forges, rowing mills and puddling furnaces. The development of these works provided impetus to the growth of Aberdare as a nucleated town. The iron industry was gradually superseded by coal and all the five iron works had closed by 1875, as the local supply of iron ore was inadequate to meet the ever-increasing demand created by the invention of steel, and as a result the importing of ore proved more profitable.

=== Coal industry ===
The iron industry had a relatively small impact upon the economy of Aberdare and in 1831 only 1.2% of the population was employed in manufacturing, as opposed to 19.8% in neighbouring Merthyr Tydfil. In the early years of Aberdare's development, most of the coal worked in the parish was coking coal, and was consumed locally, chiefly in the ironworks. Although the Gadlys works was small in comparison with the other ironworks it became significant as the Waynes also became involved in the production of sale coal. In 1836, this activity led to the exploitation of the "Four-foot Seam" of high-calorific value steam coal began, and pits were sunk in rapid succession.

In 1840, Thomas Powell sank a pit at Cwmbach, and during the next few years he opened another four pits. In the next few years, other local entrepreneurs now became involved in the expansion of the coal trade, including David Williams at Ynysgynon and David Davis at Blaengwawr, as well as the latter's son David Davis, Maesyffynnon. They were joined by newcomers such as Crawshay Bailey at Aberaman and, in due course, George Elliot in the lower part of the valley. This coal was valuable for steam railways and steam ships, and an export trade began, via the Taff Vale Railway and the port of Cardiff. The population of the parish rose from 6,471 in 1841 to 14,999 in 1851 and 32,299 in 1861 and John Davies described it as "the most dynamic place in Wales". In 1851, the Admiralty decided to use Welsh steam coal in ships of the Royal Navy, and this decision boosted the reputation of Aberdare's product and launched a huge international export market. Coal mined in Aberdare parish rose from 177,000 long tons (180,000 t) in 1844 to 477,000 long tons (485,000 t) in 1850, and the coal trade, which after 1875 was the chief support of the town, soon reached huge dimensions.

The growth of the coal trade inevitably led to a number of industrial disputes, some of which were local and others which affected the wider coalfield. Trade unionism began to appear in the Aberdare Valley at intervals from the 1830s onwards but the first significant manifestation occurred during the Aberdare Strike of 1857–8. The dispute was initiated by the depression in trade which followed the Crimean War and saw the local coal owners successfully impose a reduction in wages. The dispute did, however, witness an early manifestation of mass trade unionism amongst the miners of the valley and although unsuccessful the dispute saw the emergence of a stronger sense of solidarity amongst the miners.

Steam coal was subsequently found in the Rhondda and further west, but many of the great companies of the Welsh coal industry's Gilded Age started operation in Aberdare and the lower Cynon Valley, including those of Samuel Thomas, David Davies and Sons, Nixon's Navigation and Powell Duffryn.

During the early years of the twentieth century, the Aberdare valley became the focus of increased militancy among the mining workforce and an unofficial strike by 11,000 miners in the district from 20 October 1910 until 2 February 1911 attracted much attention at the time, although it was ultimately overshadowed by the Cambrian dispute in the neighbouring Rhondda valley which became synonymous with the so-called Tonypandy Riots.

In common with the rest of the South Wales coalfield, Aberdare's coal industry commenced a long decline after World War I, and the last two deep mines still in operation in the 1960s were the small Aberaman and Fforchaman collieries, which closed in 1962 and 1965 respectively.

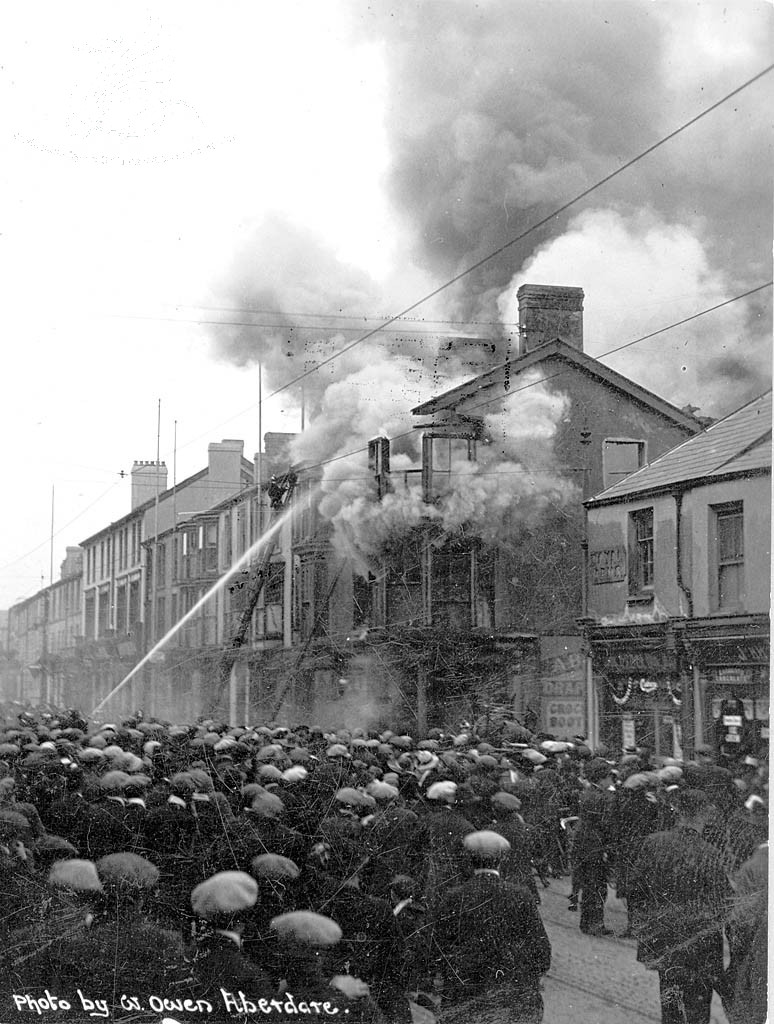
Aberdare Co-operative store fire, 11 May 1919

On 11 May 1919, an extensive fire broke out on Cardiff Street, Aberdare.

With the decline of both iron and coal, Aberdare has become reliant on commercial businesses as a major source of employment. Its industries include cable manufacture, smokeless fuels, and tourism.

== Government ==
As a small village in the upland valleys of Glamorgan, Aberdare did not play any significant part in political life until its development as an industrial settlement. It was part of the lordship of Miskin, and the ancient office of High Constable continued in ceremonial form until relatively recent times.

=== Parliamentary elections ===
In 1832, Aberdare was removed from the Glamorgan county constituency and became part of the parliamentary borough (constituency) of Merthyr Tydfil. For much of the nineteenth century, the representation was initially controlled by the ironmasters of Merthyr, notably the Guest family. From 1852 until 1868 the seat was held by Henry Austen Bruce whose main industrial interests lay in the Aberdare valley. Bruce was a Liberal but was viewed with suspicion by the more radical faction which became increasingly influential within Welsh Liberalism in the 1860s. The radicals supported such policies as the disestablishment of the Church of England and were closely allied to the Liberation Society.

==== 1868 general election ====
Nonconformist ministers played a prominent role in this new politics and, at Aberdare, they found an effective spokesman in the Rev Thomas Price minister of Calfaria, Aberdare. Following the granting of a second parliamentary seat to the borough of Merthyr Tydfil in 1867, the Liberals of Aberdare sought to ensure that a candidate from their part of the constituency was returned alongside the sitting member, Henry Austen Bruce. Their choice fell upon Richard Fothergill, owner of the ironworks at Abernant, who was enthusiastically supported by the Rev Thomas Price. Shortly before the election, however, Henry Richard intervened as a radical Liberal candidate, invited by the radicals of Merthyr. To many people's surprise, Price was lukewarm about his candidature and continued to support Fothergill. Ultimately, Henry Richard won a celebrated victory with Fothergill in second place and Bruce losing his seat. Richard thus became one of the-first radical MPs from Wales.

==== 1874–1914 ====
At the 1874 General Election, both Richard and Fothergill were again returned, although the former was criticised for his apparent lack of sympathy towards the miners during the industrial disputes of the early 1870s. This led to the emergence of Thomas Halliday as the first labour or working-class candidate to contest a Welsh constituency. Although he polled well, Halliday fell short of being elected. For the remainder of the nineteenth century, the constituency was represented by industrialists, most notably David Alfred Thomas. In 1900, however, Thomas was joined by Keir Hardie, the ILP candidate, who became the first labour representative to be returned for a Welsh constituency independent of the Liberal Party.

==== 20th century ====
The Aberdare constituency came into being at the 1918 election. The first representative was Charles Butt Stanton, who had been elected at a by-election following Hardie's death in 1915. However, in 1922, Stanton was defeated by a Labour candidate, and Labour has held the seat ever since. The only significant challenge came from Plaid Cymru at the 1970 and February 1974 General Elections, but these performances have not since been repeated. From 1984 until 2019 the parliamentary seat, later known as Cynon Valley, was held by Ann Clwyd of Labour.

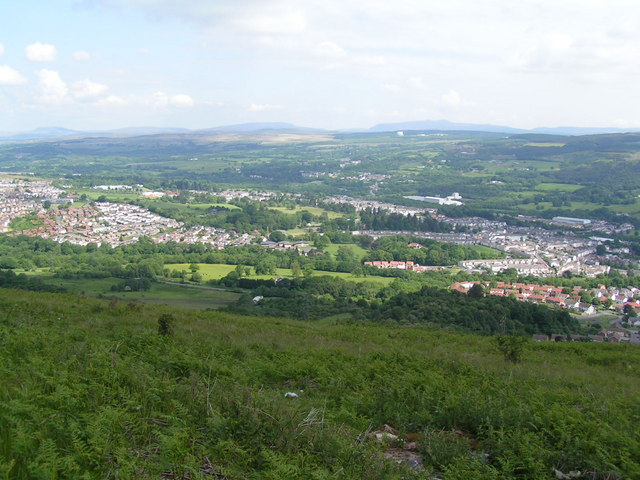
View over Aberdare

=== Local government ===
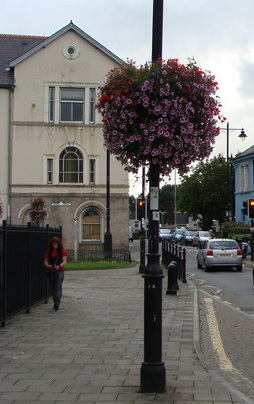
The Old Town Hall

Aberdare was an ancient parish within Glamorgan. Until the mid-19th century the local government of Aberdare and its locality remained in the hands of traditional structures such as the parish vestry and the High Constable, who was chosen annually. However, with the rapid industrial development of the parish, these traditional bodies could not cope with the realities of an urbanised, industrial community which had developed without any planning or facilities. During the early decades of the 19th century the ironmasters gradually imposed their influence over local affairs, and this remained the case following the formation of the Merthyr Board of Guardians in 1836. During the 1850s and early 1860s, however, as coal displaced iron as the main industry in the valley, the ironmasters were displaced as the dominant group in local government and administration by an alliance between mostly indigenous coal owners, shopkeepers and tradesmen, professional men and dissenting ministers. A central figure in this development was the Rev Thomas Price. The growth of this alliance was rooted in the reaction to the 1847 Education Reports and the subsequent efforts to establish a British School at Aberdare.

In the 1840s there were no adequate sanitary facilities or water supply, and mortality rates were high. Outbreaks of cholera and typhus were commonplace. Against this background, Thomas Webster Rammell prepared a report for the General Board of Health on the sanitary condition of the parish, which recommended that a local board of health be established. The whole parish of Aberdare was formally declared a local board district on 31 July 1854, to be governed by the Aberdare Local Board of Health. Its first chairman was Richard Fothergill and the members included David Davis, Blaengwawr, David Williams (Alaw Goch), Rees Hopkin Rhys and the Rev. Thomas Price. It was followed by the Aberdare School Board in 1871. The Old Town Hall was erected in 1831 although it was not converted for municipal use until the second half of the century.

By 1889, the Local Board of Health had initiated a number of developments: these included the purchase of local reservoirs from the Aberdare Waterworks Company for £97,000, a sewerage scheme costing £35,000, as well as the opening of Aberdare Public Park and a local fever hospital. The lack of a Free Library, however, remained a concern.

Later, the formation of the Glamorgan County Council (upon which Aberdare had five elected members) in 1889, followed by the Aberdare Urban District Council, which replaced the Local Board in 1894, transformed the local politics of the Aberdare valley.

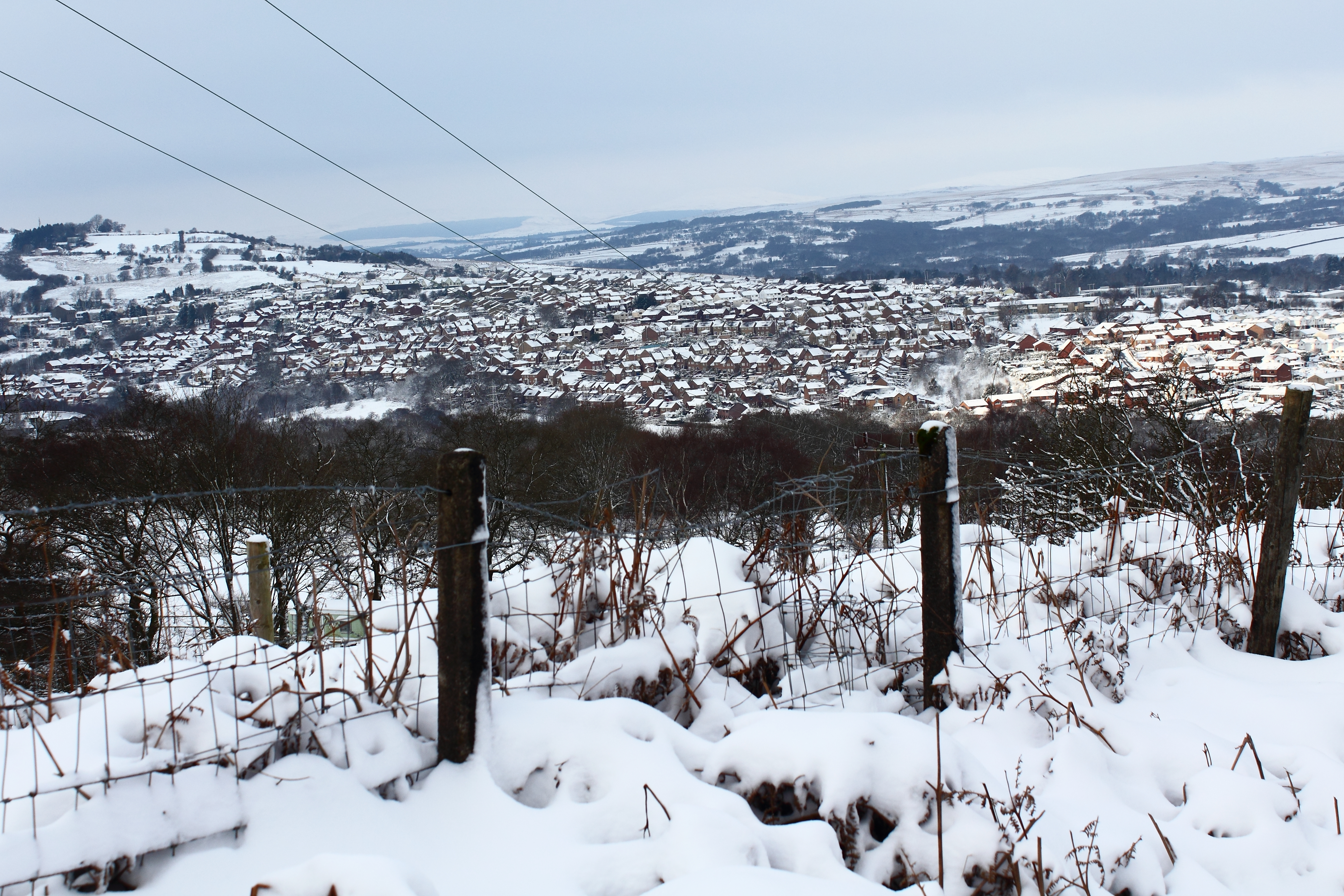
Aberdare in January 2013

At the 1889 Glamorgan County Council Elections most of the elected representatives were coalowners and industrialists, and the only exception in the earlier period was the miners' agent David Morgan (Dai o'r Nant), elected in 1892 as a labour representative. From the early 1900s, however, Labour candidates began to gain ground and dominated local government from the 1920s onwards. The same pattern was seen on the Aberdare UDC.

Aberdare Urban District was abolished in 1974 under the Local Government Act 1972. The area became part of the borough of Cynon Valley within the new county of Mid Glamorgan. The area of the former urban district was made a community, later being subdivided in 1982 into five communities: Aberaman, Cwmbach, Llwydcoed, Penywaun, and a smaller Aberdare community. The Aberdare community was further divided in 2017 into two communities called Aberdare East and Aberdare West. Aberdare East includes Aberdare town centre and the village of Abernant. Aberdare West includes Cwmdare, Cwm Sian and Trecynon. No community council exists for either of the Aberdare communities.

Cynon Valley Borough Council and Mid Glamorgan County Council were both abolished in 1996, since when Aberdare has been governed by Rhondda Cynon Taf County Borough Council. The town lies mainly in the Aberdare East ward, represented by two county councillors. Nearby Cwmdare, Llwydcoed and Trecynon are represented by the Aberdare West/Llwydcoed ward. Both wards have been represented by the Labour Party since 2012.

== Culture ==
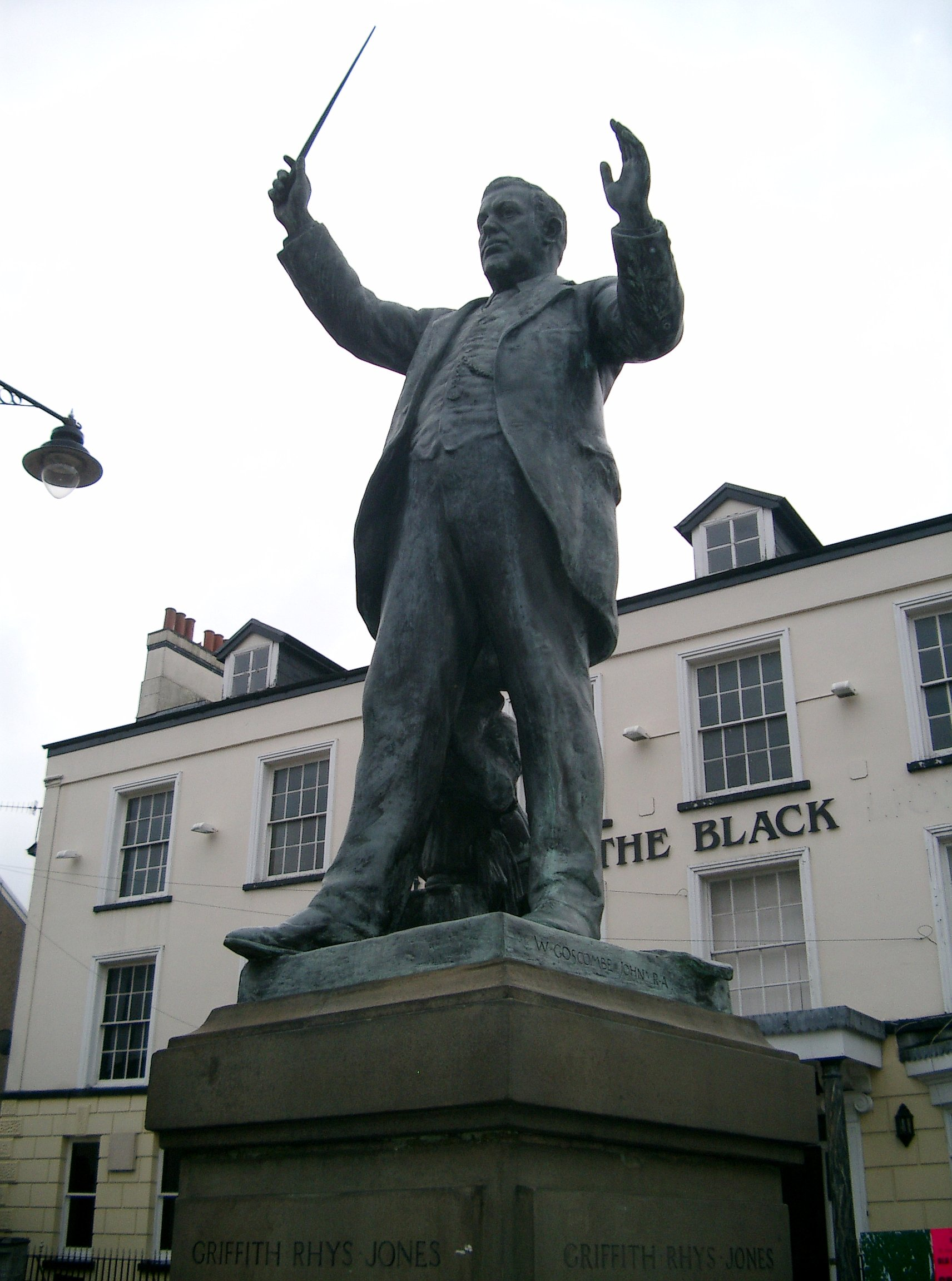
Caradog statue in Victoria Square

Aberdare, during its boom years, was considered a centre of Welsh culture: it hosted the first National Eisteddfod in 1861, with which David Williams (Alaw Goch) was closely associated. The town erected a monument in the local park to commemorate the occasion. A number of local eisteddfodau had long been held in the locality, associated with figures such as William Williams (Carw Coch) The Eisteddfod was again held in Aberdare in 1885, and also in 1956 at Aberdare Park, where the Gorsedd standing stones still exist. At the last National Eisteddfod held in Aberdare in 1956 Mathonwy Hughes won the chair. From the mid 19th century, Aberdare was an important publishing centre where a large number of books and journals were produced, the majority of which were in the Welsh language. A newspaper entitled Y Gwladgarwr (the Patriot) was published at Aberdare from 1856 until 1882 and was circulated widely throughout the South Wales valleys. From 1875 a more successful newspaper, Tarian y Gweithiwr (the Workman's Shield) was published at Aberdare by John Mills. Y Darian, as it was known, strongly supported the trade union movements among the miners and ironworkers of the valleys. The miners' leader, William Abraham, derived support from the newspaper, which was also aligned with radical nonconformist liberalism. The rise of the political labour movement and the subsequent decline of the Welsh language in the valleys, ultimately led to its decline and closure in 1934.

The Coliseum Theatre is Aberdare's main arts venue, containing a 600-seat auditorium and cinema. It is situated in nearby Trecynon and was built in 1938 using miners' subscriptions.

The Second World War poet Alun Lewis was born near Aberdare in the village of Cwmaman; there is a plaque commemorating him, including a quotation from his poem The Mountain over Aberdare.

The founding members of the rock band Stereophonics originated from Cwmaman. It is also the hometown of guitarist Mark Parry of Vancouver rock band The Manvils. Famed anarchist-punk band Crass played their last live show for striking miners in Aberdare during the UK miners' strike.

Griffith Rhys Jones − or Caradog as he was commonly known − was the conductor of the famous 'Côr Mawr' ("great choir") of some 460 voices (the South Wales Choral Union), which twice won first prize at Crystal Palace choral competitions in London in the 1870s. He is depicted in the town's most prominent statue by sculptor Goscombe John, unveiled on Victoria Square in 1920.

Aberdare was culturally twinned with the German town of Ravensburg.

== Religion ==
=== Anglican Church ===
The original parish church of St John the Baptist was originally built in 1189. Some of its original architecture is still intact.

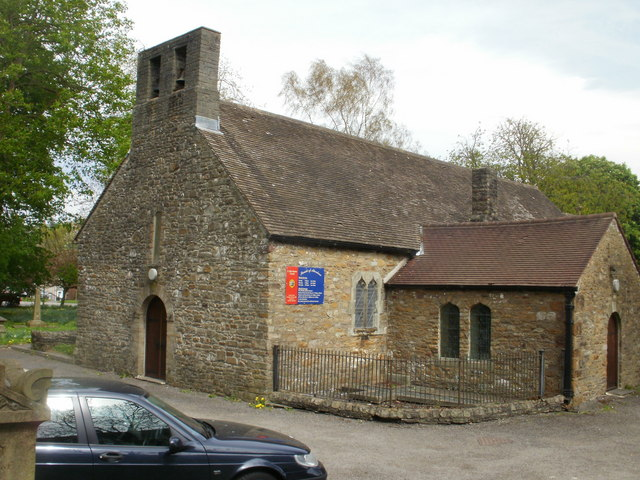
St John the Baptist's Church

With the development of Aberdare as an industrial centre in the nineteenth century it became increasingly apparent that the ancient church was far too small to service the perceived spiritual needs of an urban community, particularly in view of the rapid growth of nonconformity from the 1830s onwards. Eventually, John Griffith, the rector of Aberdare, undertook to raise funds to build a new church, leading to the rapid construction of St Elvan's Church in the town centre between 1851 and 1852. This Church in Wales church still stands the heart of the parish of Aberdare and has had extensive work since it was built. The church has a modern electrical, two-manual and pedal board pipe organ, that is still used in services.

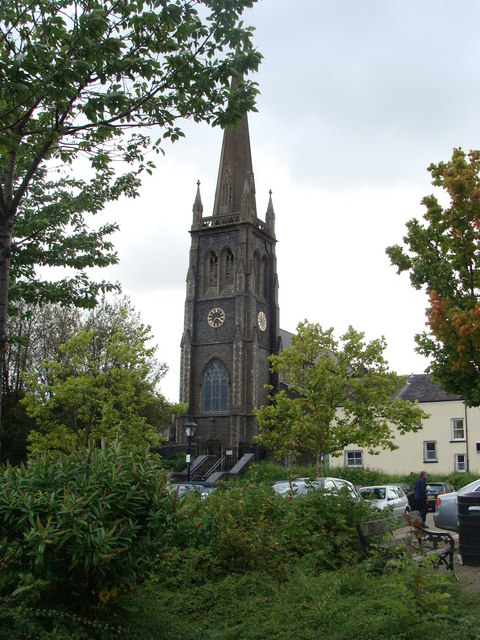
St Elvan's Church

John Griffith, vicar of Aberdare, who built St Elvan's, transformed the role of the Anglican church in the valley by building a number of other churches, including St Fagan's, Trecynon. Other churches in the parish are St Luke's (Cwmdare), St James's (Llwydcoed) and St Matthew's (1891) (Abernant).

In the parish of Aberaman and Cwmaman is St Margaret's Church, with a pipe organ with two manuals and a pedal board. Also in this parish is St Joseph's Church, Cwmaman. St Joseph's has recently undergone much recreational work, converting the church into a community centre, surrounded by a floral garden and leading to the Cwmaman Sculpture Trail. However, regular church services still take place. Here, there is a two-manual and pedal board electric organ, with speakers at the front and sides of the church.

In 1910 there were 34 Anglican churches in the Urban District of Aberdare. A survey of the attendance at places of worship on a particular Sunday in that year recorded that 17.8% of worshippers attended church services, with the remainder attending nonconformist chapels.

=== Nonconformity ===
The Aberdare Valley was a stronghold of Nonconformity from the mid-nineteenth century until the inter-war years. In the aftermath of the 1847 Education Reports nonconformists became increasingly active in the political and educational life of Wales and in few places was this as prevalent as at Aberdare. The leading figure was Thomas Price, minister of Calfaria, Aberdare.

Aberdare was a major centre of the 1904–05 Religious Revival, which had begun at Loughor near Swansea. The revival aroused alarm among ministers for the revolutionary, even anarchistic, impact it had upon chapel congregations and denominational organisation. In particular, it was seen as drawing attention away from pulpit preaching and the role of the minister. The local newspaper, the Aberdare Leader, regarded the revival with suspicion from the outset, objecting to the 'abnormal heat' which it engendered. Trecynon was particularly affected by the revival, and the meetings held there were said to have aroused more emotion and excitement than the more restrained meetings in Aberdare itself. The impact of the revival was significant in the short term, but in the longer term was fairly transient.

Once the immediate impact of the revival had faded, it was clear from the early 20th century that there was a gradual decline in the influence of the chapels. This can be explained by several factors, including the rise of socialism and the process of linguistic change which saw the younger generation increasingly turn to the English language. There were also theological controversies such as that over the New Theology propounded by R.J. Campbell.

Of the many chapels, few are still used for their original purpose and a number have closed since the turn of the millennium. Many have been converted for housing or other purposes (including one at Robertstown which has become a mosque), and others demolished. Among the notable chapels were Calfaria, Aberdare and Seion, Cwmaman (Baptist); Saron, Aberaman and Siloa, Aberdare (Independent); and Bethania, Aberdare (Calvinistic Methodist).

==== Independents ====
The earliest Welsh Independent, or Congregationalist chapel in the Aberdare area was Ebenezer, Trecynon, although meetings had been held from the late 18th century in dwelling houses in the locality, for example at Hirwaun. During the 19th century, the Independents showed the biggest increases in terms of places of worship: from two in 1837 to twenty-five (four of them being English causes), in 1897. By 1910 there were 35 Independent chapels, with a total membership of 8,612. Siloa Chapel was the largest of the Independent chapels in Aberdare and is one of the few that remain open today, having been 're-established' as a Welsh language chapel. The Independent ministers of nineteenth-century Aberdare included some powerful personalities, but none had the kind of wider social authority which Thomas Price enjoyed amongst the Baptists.

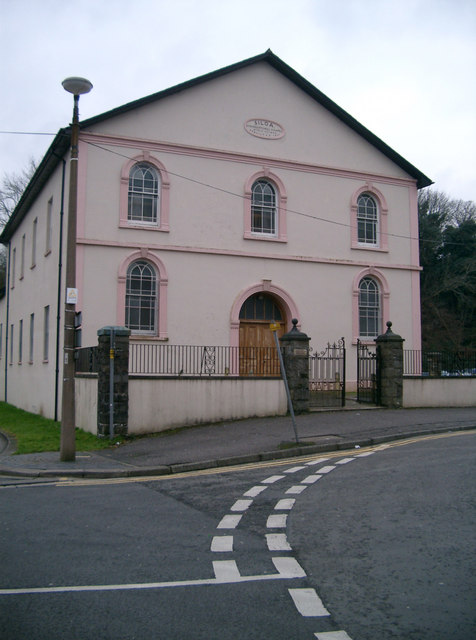
Siloa Chapel, Aberdare

Of the other Independent chapels in the valley, Saron, in Davis Street, Aberaman, was used for regular services by a small group of members until 2011. For many years, these were held in a small side-room, and not the chapel itself. The chapel has a large vestry comprising rows of two-way-facing wooden benches and a stage, with a side entrance onto Beddoe Street and back entrance to Lewis Street. Although the building is not in good repair, the interior, including pulpit and balcony seating area (back and sides), was in good order but the chapel eventually closed due to the very small number of members remaining. In February 1999, Saron became a Grade II Listed Building.

==== Baptists ====
The Baptists were the most influential of the nonconformist denominations in Aberdare and their development was led by the Rev. Thomas Price who came to Aberdare in the early 1840s as minister of Calfaria Chapel. In 1837 the Baptists had three chapels, but in 1897 there were twenty, seventeen of them being Welsh. By 1910 the number of chapels had increased to 30, with a total membership of 7,422. Most of these Baptist chapels were established under the influence of Thomas Price who encouraged members to establish branch chapels to attract migrants who flocked to the town and locality from rural Wales. The chapels came together for regular gatherings, including baptismal services which were held in the River Cynon. As a result, Price exerted an influence in the religious life of the locality which was far greater than that of any other minister.

==== Calvinistic Methodists ====
By 1910 there were 24 Calvinistic Methodist chapels in the Aberdare Urban District with a total membership of 4,879. The most prominent of these was Bethania, Aberdare, once the largest chapel in Aberdare. Derelict for many years, it was demolished in 2015. The Methodists were numerically powerful and while some of their ministers such as William James of Bethania served on the Aberdare School Board and other public bodies, their constitution militated against the sort of active political action which came more naturally to the Baptists and Independents.

==== Other denominations ====
In 1878 Mother Shepherd, a native Welsh speaker, was sent to Aberdare by the Salvation Army at the start of a period of growth for their mission. After five years she had created seven new stations before she was recalled to London. Shepherd would return to Aberdare working for the community. In 1930 she was given a public funeral.

The Wesleyan Methodists had 14 places of worship by 1910. There was also a significant Unitarian tradition in the valley and three places of worship by 1910. Highland Place Unitarian Church celebrated its 150th anniversary in 2010, with a number of lectures on its history and the history of Unitarianism in Wales taking place there. The church has a two-manual pipe organ with pedal board that is used to accompany all services. The current organist is Grace Jones, the sister of the former organist Jacob Jones. The connected schoolroom is used for post-service meetings and socialising.

=== Judaism ===
Seymour Street was once home to a synagogue which opened its doors in the late 1800s but closed in 1957. The site now has a blue plaque.

== Education ==
The state of education in the parish was a cause for concern during the early industrial period, as is illustrated by the reaction to the 1847 Education Reports. Initially, there was an outcry, led by the Rev Thomas Price against the comments made by the vicar of Aberdare in his submission to the commissioners. However, on closer reflection, the reports related the deficiencies of educational provision, not only in Aberdare itself but also in the communities of the valleys generally. In so doing they not only criticised the ironmasters for their failure to provide schools for workers' children but also the nonconformists for not establishing British Schools. At the ten schools in Aberdare there was accommodation for only 1,317 children, a small proportion of the population. Largely as a result of these criticisms, the main nonconformist denominations worked together to establish a British School, known locally as Ysgol y Comin, which was opened in 1848, accommodating 200 pupils. Funds were raised which largely cleared the debts and the opening of the school was marked by a public meeting addressed by Price and David Williams (Alaw Goch).

Much energy was expended during this period on conflicts between Anglicans and nonconformists over education. The establishment of the Aberdare School Board in 1871 brought about an extension of educational provision but also intensified religious rivalries. School Board elections were invariably fought on religious grounds. Despite these tensions the Board took over a number of existing schools and established new ones. By 1889, fourteen schools were operated by the Board but truancy and lack of attendance remained a problem, as in many industrial districts.

In common with other public bodies at the time (see 'Local Government' above), membership of the School Board was dominated by coal owners and colliery officials, nonconformist ministers, professional men and tradesmen. Only occasionally was an Anglican clergyman elected and, with the exception of David Morgan (Dai o'r Nant), no working class candidates were elected for more than one term.

=== Colleges ===
- Coleg y Cymoedd

=== Secondary schools ===
- Aberdare Community School
- St John the Baptist School, Aberdare
- Ysgol Gyfun Rhydywaun

== Transport ==
The town is served by Aberdare railway station and Aberdare bus station, opposite each other in the town centre. The town has also been subject to an extensive redevelopment scheme during 2012–13.

The GWR 2600 Class of steam locomotive, in service between 1900 and 1949, were known as the ‘Aberdare class’ due to their use on coal trains from Aberdare.

== Sports ==
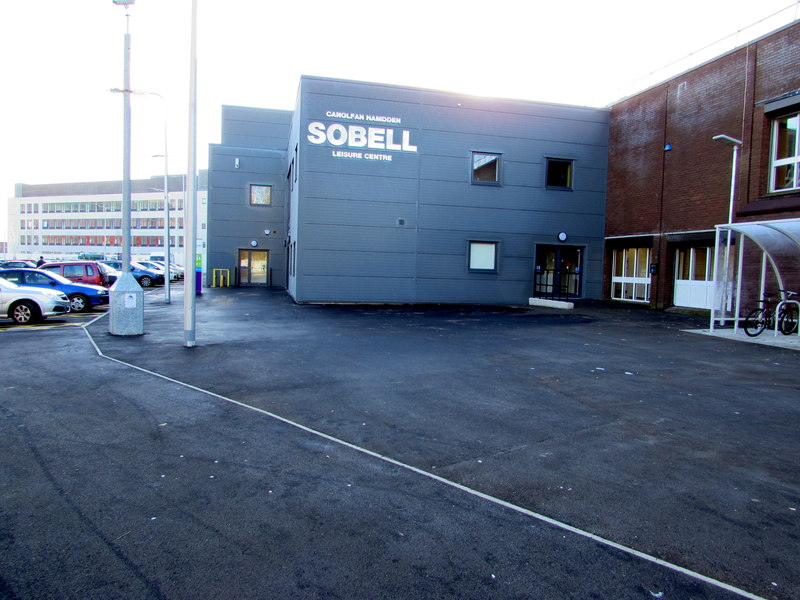
The newly redeveloped Sobell Leisure Centre in 2015

Aberdare was noted as "very remarkable" for its traditions of Taplasau Hâf (summer games/dances), races and gwrolgampau ("manly sports") which were said to have been a feature of the area since at least the 1640s. The town is also home to Yr Ynys, an historic sports ground which has the distinction of hosting the first Rugby League international, a professional Rugby League team, a football League side and an All Blacks' tour match. Today the Ynys hosts the town's Rugby union and cricket teams, as well as the Sobell Leisure Centre and the Ron Jones Athletics Stadium, a 263-seat stadium with crumb rubber track and field sports facilities, home to Aberdare Valley AAC.

=== Cricket ===
A cricket club was re-established at the Ynys in 1968 and was named Riverside Cricket Club in reference to its location near the banks of the river. The club would later be renamed Dare Valley CC, before finally changing its name to Aberdare CC. In 2008 the club was granted a 25-year lease on the land outside the boundary of the Ynys' pitch 1, where a club house and training nets were soon constructed. This was followed by the building of a Community Hub and Café in the 2010s. Today, the club runs 3 adult teams and 4 junior sides.

=== Rugby League ===
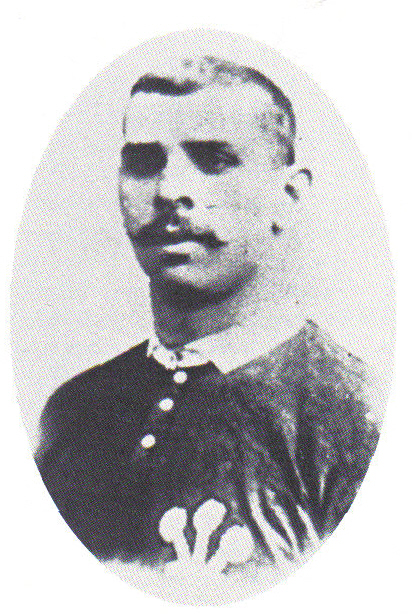
Aberdare's Dai "Tarw" Jones would score the decisive try in Wales' victory in the first ever international Rugby League match, played at the Ynys.

The Northern Union hired the Ynys on 1 January 1908 to host what would be the first ever international rugby league match. Played on a near frozen pitch, the match between Wales and the New Zealand All Golds proved to be a close and exciting game. The decisive score came from local star and former Aberdare RFC player, Dai "Tarw" Jones, who scored a try just minutes before the final whistle, giving Wales a 9–8 victory.

The match attracted 15,000 paying spectators, with the gate receipts of £560 highlighting the commercial potential of rugby league at the Ynys. This took place at a time when the Northern Union was looking to establish professional teams across south Wales and just months after the Welsh Rugby Union had sanctioned Aberdare RFC for professionalism (banning Jones for life). As such, discussions on the establishment of a Rugby League club in Aberdare advanced quickly and on 21 July 1908, Aberdare RLFC were admitted to the Northern Union's Rugby League. On 5 September 1908 the new team played their first match against Wigan in front of a crowd of 3,000 at the Ynys.

The potential for crowd support was again demonstrated on 10 November 1908, when the Ynys hosted its second international side as 5,000 spectators watched Aberdare take on the first touring Australian team. However the Aberdare club side could not replicate the heroics of the Welsh team, losing the match 10–37. Indeed, Aberdare struggled under Northern Union rules and initially high crowd numbers deteriorated with the poor results, which saw Aberdare finishing their only season in the Rugby Football League as the bottom club. Finally on 10 July 1909, Aberdare reported 'unexpected difficulties' in its finances and resigned from the Northern Rugby League.

=== Rugby Union ===
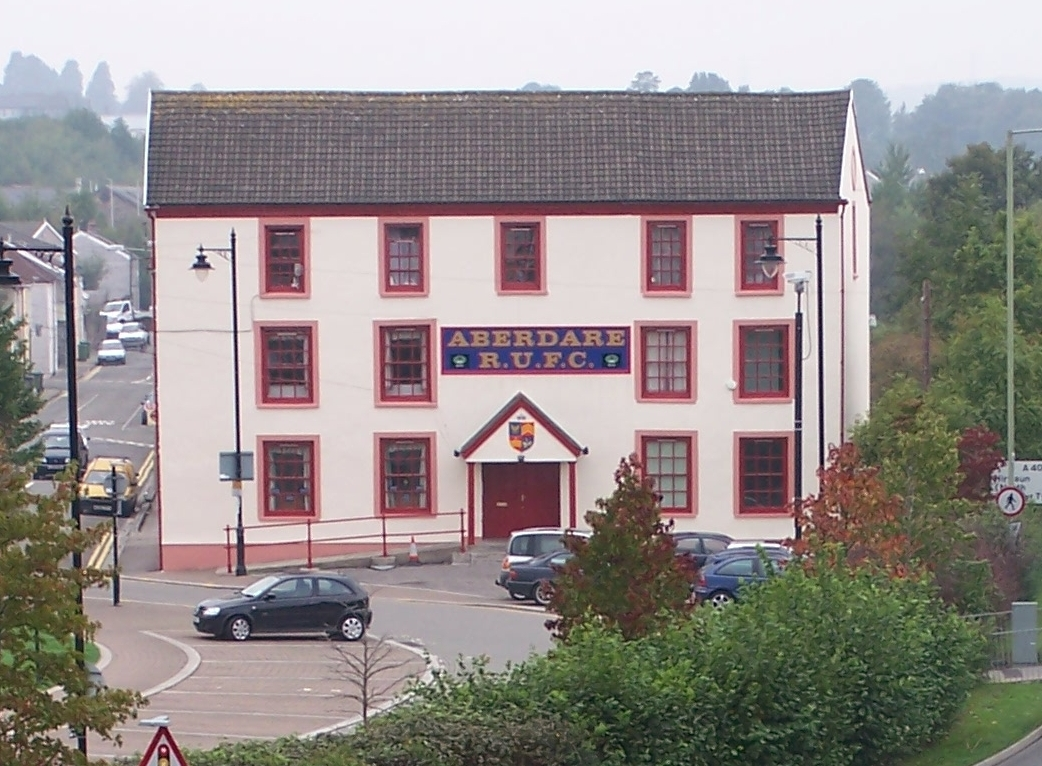
The modern Aberdare Rugby Club near the Ynys. The signage displays the initials as RUFC rather than RFC, distinguishing it as the town's rugby union club.

A rugby club representing Aberdare was recorded as early as 1876, but the modern Aberdare RFC traces its history back to a foundation of 1890. The club had great success in the early twentieth century with local star Dai 'Tarw' Jones captaining the club from 1905 to 1907. Jones gained recognition as a player in club, representative and international games. Most notably, Jones played an important part in the "Match of the century", when Wales defeated the New Zealand All Blacks. In 1907, Jones and the Aberdare club played a pivotal role in the professionalism scandal, with the Welsh Rugby Union permanently suspending the club's entire committee and a number of players (including a lifetime ban for Jones). These events would quickly lead to many of the town's players and fans switching to rugby league, with the first ever rugby league international and the founding of Aberdare RLFC in 1908.

Despite the suspensions, rugby union continued in the town as the club (renamed Aberaman RFC) moved to Aberaman Park. The Ynys Stadium would host its first international rugby union side on 12 December 1935, when the 1935-36 All Blacks played a tour match against a Mid-Districts side. The All Blacks won the match 31–10 in front of a crowd of 6,000.

Aberaman RFC returned to the Ynys in the 1960s. In February 1971, a clubhouse was opened at the old Crown Hotel in Gloucester Street, this was followed by the construction of a grand stand at the Ynys costing £20,000. Following the advent of professionalism in rugby union, the WRU sanctions against Aberdare were no longer applicable. As such, the club took the name Aberdare RUFC once again. Aberdare is also home to Abercwmboi RFC and Hirwaun RFC.

=== Association Football ===
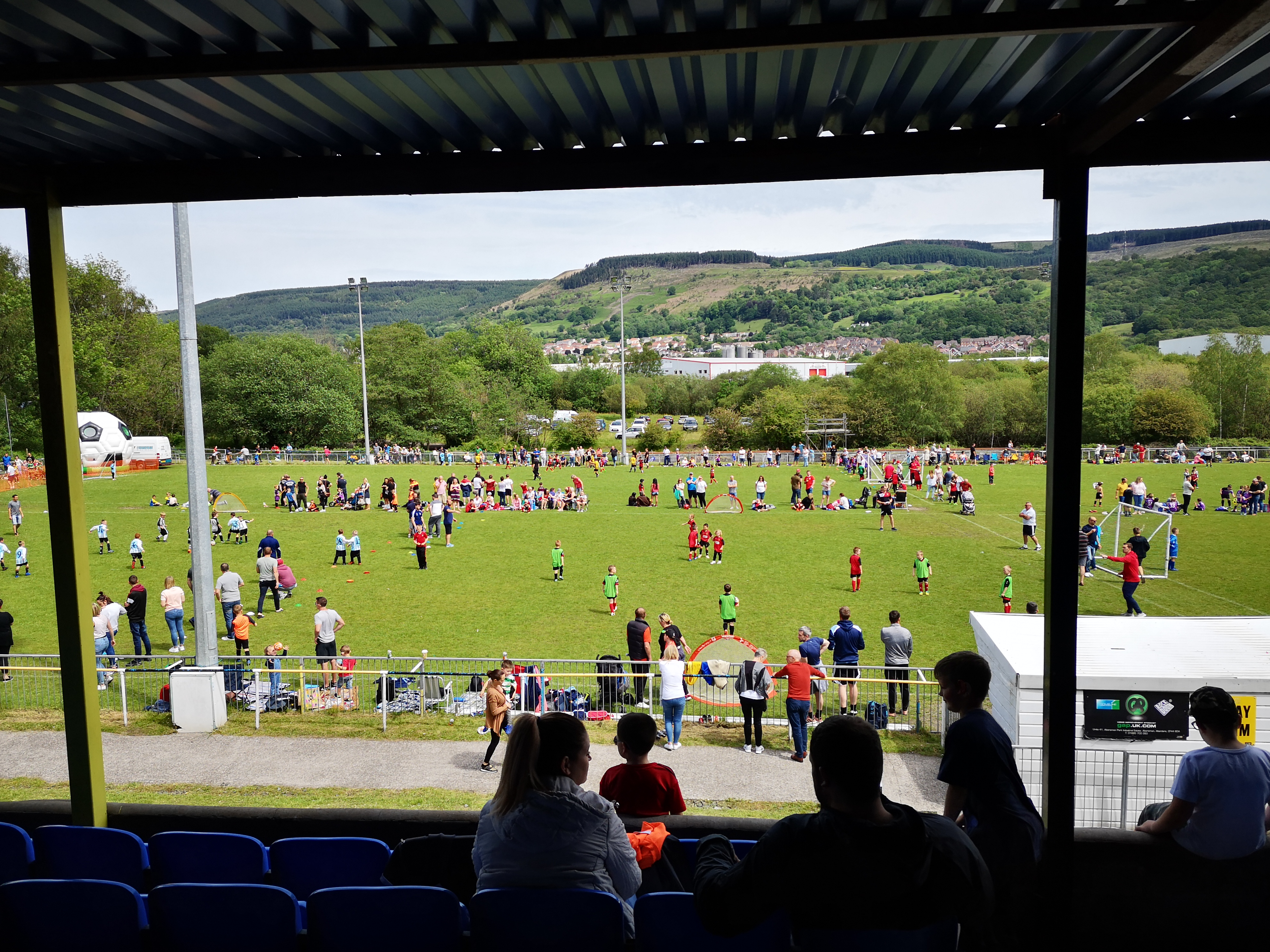
Aberaman Park was once home to Aberdare RFC and is the current home ground of Aberdare Town FC.

The Ynys stadium was also home to Aberdare Athletic F.C., members of the Football League between 1921 and 1927. Aberdare finished bottom in their final season and folded in 1928 after failing to be re-elected to the league.

Aberaman Athletic F.C. continued to play until World War II, and was succeeded by Aberdare & Aberaman Athletic in 1945 and Aberdare Town F.C. in 1947. The club continued to play in the Welsh Football League. Today, Aberdare Town plays in the Aberdare Valley League and are based at Aberaman Park.

== In fiction ==
The town is the location for the Christianna Brand novel, The Brides of Aberdar.

== Notable people ==
See also Category:People from Aberdare

=== Arts ===
- Ieuan Ddu ap Dafydd ab Owain – 15th century bard
- Edward Evans - 18th century bard
- Ioan Gruffudd – actor, born in Llwydcoed, Aberdare
- Caradog (Griffith Rhys Jones) – conductor of the famous choirs Côr Caradog and Côr Mawr who won first prize at The Crystal Palace choral competitions in 1872 and 1873.
- Carw Coch (William Williams) - Bard, publisher and literary figure who worked to establish the Eisteddfod movement.
- Alaw Goch (David Williams) - coal-owner and bard who helped establish The National Eisteddfod of Wales
- Alun Lewis – war poet
- Mihangel Morgan – Welsh language writer, born in Trecynon whose works often feature Aberdare
- John Morgan – comedian, most notably with Royal Canadian Air Farce
- Roy Noble – writer and broadcaster who has lived much of his life in Llwydcoed, Aberdare
- Ieuan Rhys – actor from Trecynon
- Rhian Samuel – composer and professor of music
- Stereophonics – all three original members, Kelly Jones, Richard Jones and Stuart Cable were brought up in Cwmaman, Aberdare
- Jo Walton – fantasy novelist, now living in Montreal, Quebec
- Laura Evans – singer songwriter

=== Politicians ===
- Henry Austin Bruce – 1st Baron Aberdare & Home Secretary (1868–1873)
- Rose Davies – Labour politician and feminist
- Patrick Hannan – political journalist, author and a presenter on television and radio.
- Rhys Hopkin Rhys – 19th century industrialist and prominent local politician
- Bethan Sayed – Member of the Senedd for South Wales West

=== Religion ===
- R. Ifor Parry – Congregationalist Minister and schoolteacher
- Thomas Price (Baptist minister) – Baptist Minister and radical politician

=== Science ===
- Lyn Evans – particle physicist and project leader of the Large Hadron Collider

=== Sportspeople ===
- Jon Bryant – Wales international rugby union player
- Les Cartwright – Wales international association footballer
- Isaak Davies – association Footballer
- Neil Davies – Wales rugby league international
- Amy Evans – Wales international rugby union player
- Ian Evans – Wales international and British & Irish Lions rugby union player
- Rosser Evans – Wales international rugby union player
- David "Tarw" Jones – dual code rugby international for Wales rugby league and Wales rugby union international teams
- Arthur Linton – cyclist
- Dafydd Lockyer – rugby union player for Pontypridd RFC and Neath RFC
- Jimmy Michael – world cycling champion
- 'Big' Jim Mills – Wales & Great Britain rugby league international
- Teddy Morgan – Wales international and British & Irish Lions rugby union player
- William Llewellyn Morgan – Wales international and British & Irish Lions rugby union player
- Darren Morris – Wales international and British & Irish Lions rugby union player
- Jason Price – association footballer
- Martin Roberts – Wales international rugby union player
- Rees Thomas – association footballer
- Lee Williams – Wales rugby league international
- Dai Young – Wales international rugby union player and coach and three times British & Irish Lions tourist
- Thomas Young – Wales international rugby union player

== See also ==
- List of twin towns and sister cities in the United Kingdom
- Aberdare Park

== Sources ==
=== Books ===
- Davies, John (1994). A history of Wales (New ed.). London: Penguin. ISBN 0-14-014581-8.
- Jones, Dot (1998). Statistical Evidence relating to the Welsh Language 1801–1911. Cardiff: University of Wales Press. ISBN 0708314600.
- Jones, Ieuan Gwynedd (1981). Explorations & Explanations. Essays in the Social History of Victorian Wales. Llandysul: Gomer. ISBN 0-85088-644-9.
- Jones, Ieuan Gwynedd (1987). Communities. Essays in the Social History of Victorian Wales. Llandysul: Gomer. ISBN 0-86383-223-7.
- Morgan, Kenneth O (1991). Wales in British Politics 1868–1922 (3rd ed.). Cardiff: University of Wales Press. ISBN 0708311245.
- Morgan, Kenneth O. (1981). Rebirth of a Nation. Wales 1889–1980. Oxford: Oxford University Press. ISBN 0-19-821760-9.
- Newman, John (1995). Glamorgan. London: Penguin Group. ISBN 0140710566.
- Rees, D. Ben (1975). Chapels in the Valley. The Ffynnon Press. ISBN 0-902158-08-2.

=== Journals ===
- Barclay, Martin (1978). ""The Slaves of the Lamp". The Aberdare Miners Strike 1910" (PDF). Llafur: The Journal of the Society for the Study of Welsh Labour History. 2 (3): 24–42. Archived (PDF) from the original on 9 October 2022.
- Jones, Ieuan Gwynedd (1964). "Dr. Thomas Price and the election of 1868 in Merthyr Tydfil : a study in nonconformist politics (Part One)" (PDF). Welsh History Review. 2 (2): 147–172. Archived (PDF) from the original on 9 October 2022.
- Jones, Ieuan Gwynedd (1965). "Dr Thomas Price and the election of 1868 in Merthyr Tydfil: a study in nonconformist politics (Part Two)" (PDF). Welsh History Review. 2 (3): 251–70. Archived (PDF) from the original on 9 October 2022.
- Parry, Jon (1989). "Labour Leaders and Local Politics 1888–1902: The Example of Aberdare" (PDF). Welsh History Review. 14 (3): 399–416. Archived (PDF) from the original on 9 October 2022.
- Turner, Christopher B. (1984). "Religious revivalism and Welsh Industrial Society: Aberdare in 1859" (PDF). Llafur: The Journal of the Society for the Study of Welsh Labour History. 4 (1): 4–13. Archived (PDF) from the original on 9 October 2022.
- Wills, Wilton D. (1969). "The Rev. John Griffith and the revival of the established church in nineteenth century Glamorgan" (PDF). Morgannwg. 13: 75–102.

=== Newspapers ===
- Aberdare Leader
- Cardiff and Merthyr Guardian

=== Online ===
- Rammell, Thomas Webster (1853). "Report to the General Board of Health on a preliminary inquiry into the sewerage, drainage, and supply of water, and the sanitary condition of the inhabitants of the inhabitants of the parish of Aberdare in the county of Glamorgan". Internet Archive. General Board of Health.

=== External sources ===
- BBC website on Aberdare
- Website of the Parish of St Fagans Aberdare
