= Bethania Chapel, Aberdare =

Former chapel in Aberdare, Rhondda Cynon Taf, Wales

Coordinates: 51.7122°N 3.4456°W

Bethania, Aberdare
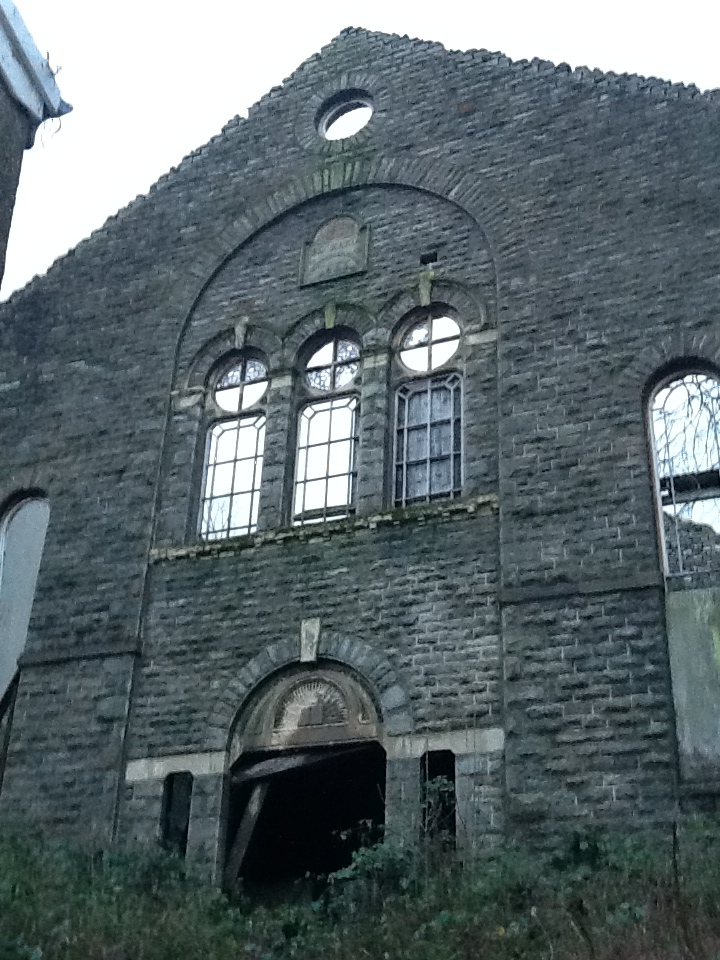
- Bethania Chapel in ruins in 2014
- Bethania, Aberdare
- Country: Wales
- Denomination: Calvinistic Methodist

Architecture
- Architectural type: Chapel
- Style: Late 19th century
- Completed: 1853
- Closed: c. 1990
- Demolished: 2015

Bethania was a Calvinistic Methodist chapel in Aberdare, Rhondda Cynon Taf, Wales, which seated 550 people. Located near the centre of Aberdare, it had a somewhat concealed entrance and was approached up a long flight of steps.

The chapel was designated a Grade II-listed building on 1 October 1991. It closed in the early 1990s and has now been demolished.

== History ==
The cause is said to have begun with the holding of a Sunday School at the Black Lion hotel, immediately in front of where the chapel was built. The first building, erected in 1853, was designed by Evan Griffiths of Aberdare and built by David Evans, on a field known as Cae Tirion which was part of the Ynyslwyd estate, at a cost of £500.

The minister from 1870 until 1908 was William James, a native of Trefin in Pembrokeshire. James became a member of the Aberdare School Board for several years.

Bethania's membership declined rapidly after the Second World War, although the opening of Ysgol Gynradd Gymraeg Aberdâr briefly revived the Sunday School, allowing the then minister to address the children in Welsh for the first time or many years. In 1965 a service was held at Bethania to mark the centenary of the Welsh colony in Patagonia.

== Bibliography ==
- Jones, Alan Vernon (2004). Chapels of the Cynon Valley. Cynon Valley Historical Society. ISBN 0953107612.
