= David Davis, Maesyffynnon (coal owner) =

Welsh coal mine owner (1821–1884)

David Davis, Maesyffynnon, (1821–1884), son of David Davis, Blaengwawr was a prominent Welsh coal owner and public figure. He built upon the work of his father and expanded the family's industrial holdings in the Aberdare and Rhondda valleys. He had two daughters, Mary and Catherine. Mary married H.T. Edwards, vicar of Aberdare and later Dean of St Asaph and Catherine married Sir Francis Edwards.

== Career in industry ==
The family business, built up by his father, was based on the Aberdare Valley, and a number of collieries were opened south of Aberdare, such as that at Abercwmboi. During his father's last years, the family became involved in the early exploitation of the coal reserves of the neighbouring Rhondda Valleys, with the Davis family's operations being concentrated on Ferndale in the Rhondda Fach. Despite the huge loss of life at Ferndale in 1867 he was regarded as a good employer.

During the strikes of the 1870s, Davis was among the most conciliatory among the coal owners, endeavouring to bring disputes to an end.

The collieries of David Davis and Sons remained open throughout the lock-out of 1875. He later became vice-chairman of the South Wales Conciliation Board, chaired by H. H.Vivian.

A wealthy man, he had quarrying ventures in Merioneth, and became high sheriff of the county in 1869. He built a house at Arthog, between Dolgellau and Barmouth where his wife died in 1880.

== Politics and public life ==
Davis was from an early age more interested in public life than his self-made father had been. As early as 1847 he was involved in public meetings called in response to the 1847 Education Reports. He became actively involved in the public life of the Aberdare Valley, as a member of the Aberdare Local Board of Health and Aberdare School Board. His educational interests also made him a generous supporter of the University colleges at Aberystwyth and Cardiff.

In the 1860s he was initially mentioned as a prospective Liberal candidate for the Merthyr Boroughs parliamentary seat. However, he declined the invitation and was prominent in Henry Richard's successful campaign for election as MP for the constituency. Davis presided at a number of Richard's meetings. At one such meeting, at Trecynon in late September, Richard criticised those who had sought to discourage him from contesting the seat, both publicly and privately (a veiled reference to Thomas Price of Calfaria). At the end of the meeting the crowd released the horses and drew Richard's carriage back to Davis's residence at Maesyffynon.

Like his brother, Lewis, was invited to contest the second seat there when Richard Fothergill retired in 1880.

== Religion ==
Unlike his father, who remained an active Wesleyan throughout his life, David Davis, Maesyffynnon, became involved in a schism which led to the short-lived 'Wesleyan Reform' movement. The 'Reform' chapel at Aberdare eventually, became Congregationalist.

== Later life ==
Davis died in 1884 at the residence of his brother, Lewis Davis, Ferndale.

== Bibliography ==
- Jones, Ieuan Gwynedd (1965). "Dr Thomas Price and the election of 1868 in Merthyr Tydfil: a study in nonconformist politics (Part Two)". Welsh History Review. 2 (3): 251–70.
