= Neil Davies =

Neil Davies may refer to:

- Neil Davies (Australian footballer) (1931–2009), Australian rules footballer
- Neil Davies (rugby league), Welsh rugby league footballer who played in the 2000s

== See also ==
- Neil Davis (disambiguation)
