= Soar Chapel, Hirwaun =

Former chapel in Hirwaun, Rhondda Cynon Taf, Wales

Coordinates: 51.7400°N 3.5103°W

Soar, Hirwaun was a Wesleyan Methodist chapel in Station Road, Hirwaun, Aberdare, Wales.

== History ==
The church at Soar dated from 1805, when the Hirwaun ironworks were in operation, and early meetings were held in a barn before the first chapel was built in 1824 In 1837 the first chapel was converted into cottages and a new chapel built at a cost of £550, with seating for 260. Rent from the cottages was used to support the church. David Davis, grocer and owner of the London Warehouse, was instrumental in the building of the 1837 chapel. He later became a prominent coal owner in the Cynon and Rhondda valleys.

The chapel was rebuilt in 1886 and opened by Frederick Lewis Davis, grandson of David Davis.

The chapel closed in 1977. The members moved to the English Wesleyan chapel in Hirwaun.

== Bibliography ==
- Jones, Alan Vernon (2004). Chapels of the Cynon Valley. Cynon Valley Historical Society. ISBN 0953107612.
