= John Griffith (priest) =

Welsh clergyman (died 1885)

John Griffith was among the most prominent clergymen in industrial south Wales during the second half of the nineteenth century. He was rector of Aberdare from 1846 until 1859. From 1859 until his death in 1885 he was vicar of Merthyr Tydfil where he proved a strong supporter of workers' rights and, by the end of his life a supporter of the disestablishment of the Church of England in Wales. This reflected the way in which he gradually abandoned the strong Tory principles that he espoused at the beginning of his career at Aberdare. He died on 24 April 1885.

== Early life and career ==
Griffith was born in 1818 or 1819 in Llanbadarn Fawr, Cardiganshire, the son of Thomas Griffith. He commenced his education at Ystradmeurig School, which was a popular choice amongst the gentlemen farmers of Cardiganshire for educating their sons. He proceeded to Swansea Grammar School and Christ's College, Cambridge, he was ordained a priest in 1843. After a short period as curate of Astbury in Cheshire, Griffith benefitted from the patronage of Sir Stephen Glynne, brother-in-law of W.E. Gladstone, and for a short time became family chaplain at Hawarden. However, a collapse in the family finances in 1846 made it necessary for Griffith to seek alternative employment.

At this time, Griffith had been writing to the Cardiff and Merthyr Guardian, using the pseudonym, Cambro Sacerdos, and in these articles drew attention to deficiencies that still existed within the church despite reforms undertaken in the 1830s. The articles came to the attention of the owner of the newspaper, the Marquis of Bute. Bute was not only an evangelical and supporter of church reform but also, as Lord Lieutenant of Glamorgan, concerned about the preservation of law and order within the developing industrial communities in the upland parts of the county. Under these circumstances, Griffith emerged as a candidate for the vacant parish of Aberdare which was endowed by the Marquis.

== John Griffith at Aberdare ==
The parish of Aberdare was established in 1846 when it ceased to be part of the pre-industrial parish of Llantrisant, many miles to the south. The new parish was a large one, extending from Hirwaun in the north to Mountain Ash in the south, an area of some fifty square miles centred on the town of Aberdare. The whole area was expanding rapidly due to the opening of ironworks and collieries, with the population increasing by approximately 1,000 people each year. The only Anglican place of worship was the small and ancient St John's Church, while there were already at least fourteen substantial nonconformist chapels in the parish. It was only towards the end of his ministry at Aberdare that St John's Church became suitable for regular worship once again after a restoration costing £900. By that time however, Griffith had instigated the building of St Elvan's Church, commonly known as the Cathedral of the Valleys, which revitalised the influence of the Church in this industrial community.

However, his initial impact on the parish did not attract a positive response. Soon after his arrival at Aberdare, Griffith became embroiled in the controversy over the 1847 Education Reports following evidence he gave to the commissioners about the alleged immorality of the local population. He later elaborated upon or repeated his claims in letters to the press, such as that published in the Cardiff and Merthyr Guardian in February 1848. On that occasion, Griffith argued that he merely repeated what had been said for many years by David Owen (Brutus) in the Anglican journal, Yr Haul. This provoked fury form local nonconformist ministers led by the Rev Thomas Price and it has been argued that this episode enabled Price to assume the leadership of political nonconformity in Aberdare and further afield.

However, he soon proved to be a more complex figure than the caricature attacked by Price. In late 1848 he criticised his own church's apparent indifference towards the Welsh-speaking population, most clearly seen in the appointment of monoglot Englishmen to ecclesiastical posts in Wales. While at Aberdare he sought to expand the activities of the established church in the parish Aberdare, commencing services at Hirwaun and building St Fagan's Church, Trecynon. He also sought to improve the conditions of the working classes in the town, and sought to establish a mechanics’ institute, a reading room and lending-library. He also inaugurated a series of public lectures.

== John Griffith at Merthyr Tydfil ==
Griffith's move to Merthyr Tydfil saw him take over a much larger and more established parish than Aberdare. In 1859, Merthyr was affected by the Religious Revival which affected much of Wales, and Griffith supported the movement although it was primarily associated with nonconformity.

He became less than popular with the church authorities, however, as a result of his support for disestablishment. In July 1883, he stated that ‘I have been for years convinced that nothing but Disestablishment, the separation of the Church from the State, can ever reform the Church in Wales.’

Griffith's funeral was said to have been attended by between 12,000 and 15,000 people 'I venture to declare', wrote one correspondent, ' no man in this part of the kingdom could be more popular in his day and generation than the Rev. John Griffith.' Among the nonconformist ministers present at the funeral was his old rival, Dr Thomas Price of Aberdare.

== Sources ==
=== Books and Journals ===
- Turner, Christopher B. (1984). "Religious revivalism and Welsh Industrial Society: Aberdare in 1859". Llafur: The Journal of the Society for the Study of Welsh Labour History. 4 (1): 4–13.
- Wills, Wilton D. (1969). "The Rev. John Griffith and the revival of the established church in nineteenth century Glamorgan". Morgannwg. 13: 75–102.
