= St John's Church, Aberdare =

Coordinates: 51.7138°N 3.4489°W

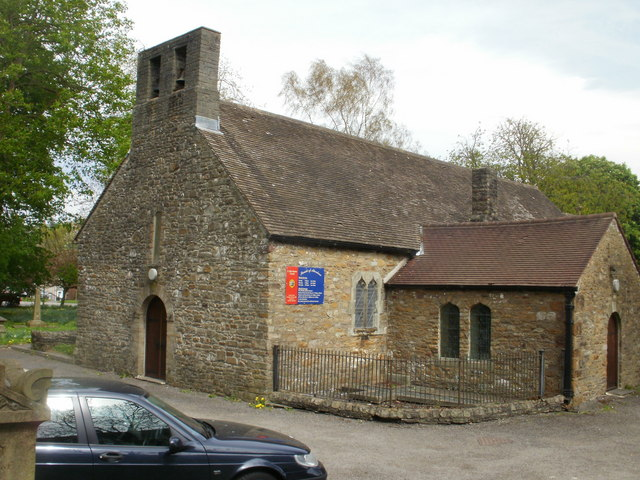
St John the Baptist's Church

St John the Baptist's is an ancient parish church in the centre of the town of Aberdare, Wales.

== History ==
The original parish church was built in 1189. Some of its original architecture is still intact.

John Wesley preached on two occasions at St John's in 1749.

By the first half of the nineteenth century, St Johns's could only accommodate 250 people although the parish of Aberdare had a population of 13,000. The condition of the church was said to be poor, and one commentator stated that the parishioners worshipped their maker in darkness. By 1853, the burial ground was full and the vicar, John Griffith, reported that until the ground was drained last year there was so much water in the soil that the coffins were often floating in it. The drainage now is not very complete. It took Griffith ten years to instigate the restoration of the church at a cost of £900, and it only became suitable for regular worship once again shortly before his departure to be rector of Merthyr Tydfil. In the meantime, Griffith had instigated the building of St Elvan's Church, commonly known as the Cathedral of the Valleys, within sight of the older building.

The building is Grade II* listed.

== Sources ==
=== Books and Journals ===
- Jones, Ieuan Gwynedd (1987). Communities. Essays in the Social History of Victorian Wales. Llandysul: Gomer. ISBN 0-86383-223-7.
- Wills, Wilton D. (1969). "The Rev. John Griffith and the revival of the established church in nineteenth century Glamorgan". Morgannwg. 13: 75–102.

=== Online ===
- Rammell, Thomas Webster (1853). "Report to the General Board of Health on a preliminary inquiry into the sewerage, drainage, and supply of water, and the sanitary condition of the inhabitants of the inhabitants of the parish of Aberdare in the county of Glamorgan". Internet Archive. General Board of Health.
