= Neil Davis =

Neil Davis may refer to:

- Neil Davis (cameraman) (1934–1985), Australian combat cameraman during the Vietnam War and other Indochinese conflicts
- Neil Davis (cricketer) (1900–1974), Australian cricketer
- T. Neil Davis (1932–2016), geophysicist
- Neil Davis (footballer) (born 1973), English footballer

== See also ==
- Neil Davies (disambiguation)
