= Tarian y Gweithiwr =

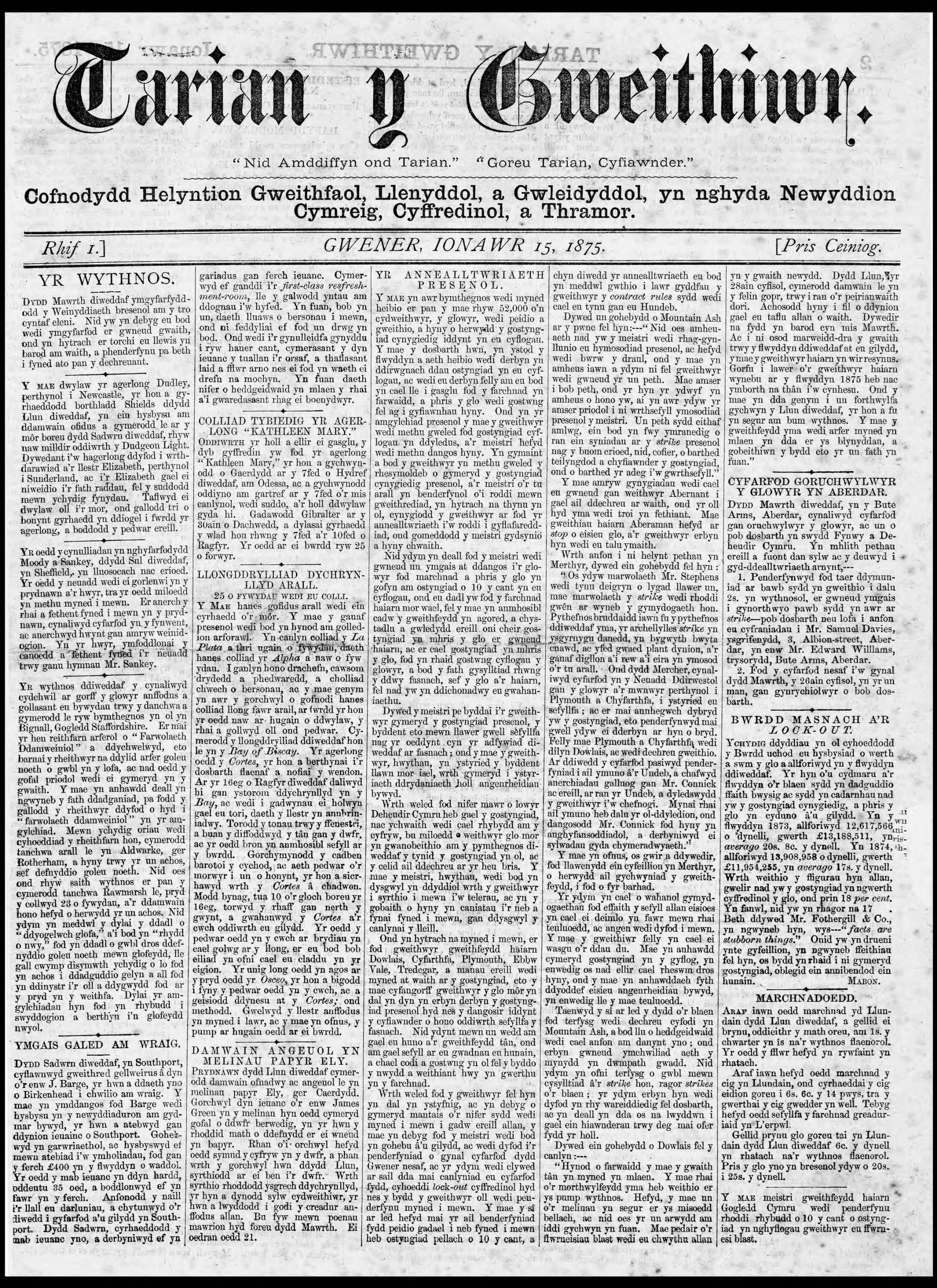
- Tarian Y Gweithiwr
- Type: weekly newspaper
- Editor: J. Tywi Jones[*]
- Launched: 15 January 1875
- Ceased publication: 9 July 1914
- Relaunched: Y Darian
- City: Aberdare
- OCLC number: 502362146

Tarian y Gweithiwr (The Worker's Shield) was a weekly Welsh-language newspaper published in Aberdare between 1875 and 1934, initially by the firm of Mills, Lynch, and Davies. The paper achieved a peak circulation of around 15,000 copies a week.

A supporter of radical principles, Tarian y Gweithiwr emphasised workers' rights in its coverage of political news as well as in opinion pieces, making it popular with the miners and other industrial workers of South Wales.

Welsh Newspapers Online has digitised 1,645 issues of Tariany Y Gweithiwr (1875–1910) from among the newspaper holdings of the National Library of Wales.

== Associated titles ==
Y Darian (1914–1934)
