= Old Town Hall, Aberdare =

Municipal Building in Aberdare, Wales

Old Town Hall
- Hen Neuadd y Dref Aberdare (Welsh)
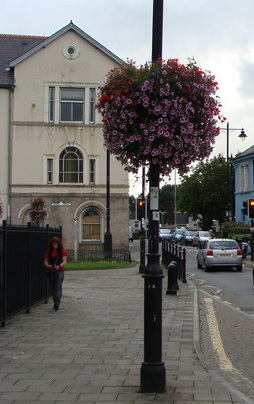
- The south elevation of the building in September 2009

- Shown in Rhondda Cynon Taf
- 51.7135°N 3.4479°W
- Location: High Street, Aberdare

History
- Built: 1831

Site notes
- Architectural style: Neoclassical style

Listed Building – Grade II
- Official name: Town Hall
- Designated: 10 January 1991
- Reference no.: 10855

The Old Town Hall (Welsh: Hen Neuadd y Dref Aberdare) is a municipal building located on the High Street in Aberdare in Rhondda Cynon Taf in Wales. The structure, which is currently used as a coffee shop, is a Grade II listed building.

== History ==
The building was commissioned as a market hall and was located in the Greenfach area, which was where the old Aberdare Village was developing at that time. It was designed in the neoclassical style, built in brick with a cement render and was completed in 1831. In the mid-19th century, civic leaders decided to erect a more substantial market hall in order to compete with the market halls of Merthyr Tydfil, which had been completed in 1838, and Dowlais which had been completed in 1844. The new market hall was erected in what is now Market Street and was completed in 1853.

The parish of Aberdare was declared a local board district on 31 July 1854, and the Aberdare Local Board of Health was established to administer it. The new board decided to convert the old market hall into a town hall to accommodate its offices and meeting place. The town hall was largely rebuilt in the late 19th century. After the local board was succeeded by Aberdare Urban District Council in 1894, the new council decided to adopt the building as its headquarters. The building then continued to serve as the offices of the urban district council for much of the 20th century, but ceased to be the local seat of government when the enlarged Cynon Valley District Council was established in 1974.

It suffered a fire in 1980, following which one corner was rebuilt, and it was grade II listed in 1991. After being vacant for many years, in 2012, it was sold to a developer and, in 2014, it was converted into flats, with a coffee shop on the ground floor. In January 2015, the Welsh Government Minister for Communities and Tackling Poverty, Lesley Griffiths, visited the building to see completed conversion. At the time of the disposal, a war memorial plaque, which had been unveiled in May 1922 and placed close to the entrance, was relocated to the foyer of Aberdare Library.

== Architecture ==
The building has a cement render finish and a slate roof. Its front is five bays wide and was originally an open arcade, but is now filled in up to sill level, except for the second bay where there is a door with a fanlight. The first and second floors are fenestrated with sash windows. The south elevation features a Venetian window on the first floor and a tri-partite window on the second floor.
