= St Elvan's Church, Aberdare =

Church in Aberdare, Rhondda Cynon Taf, Wales

Coordinates: 51.7132°N 3.4451°W

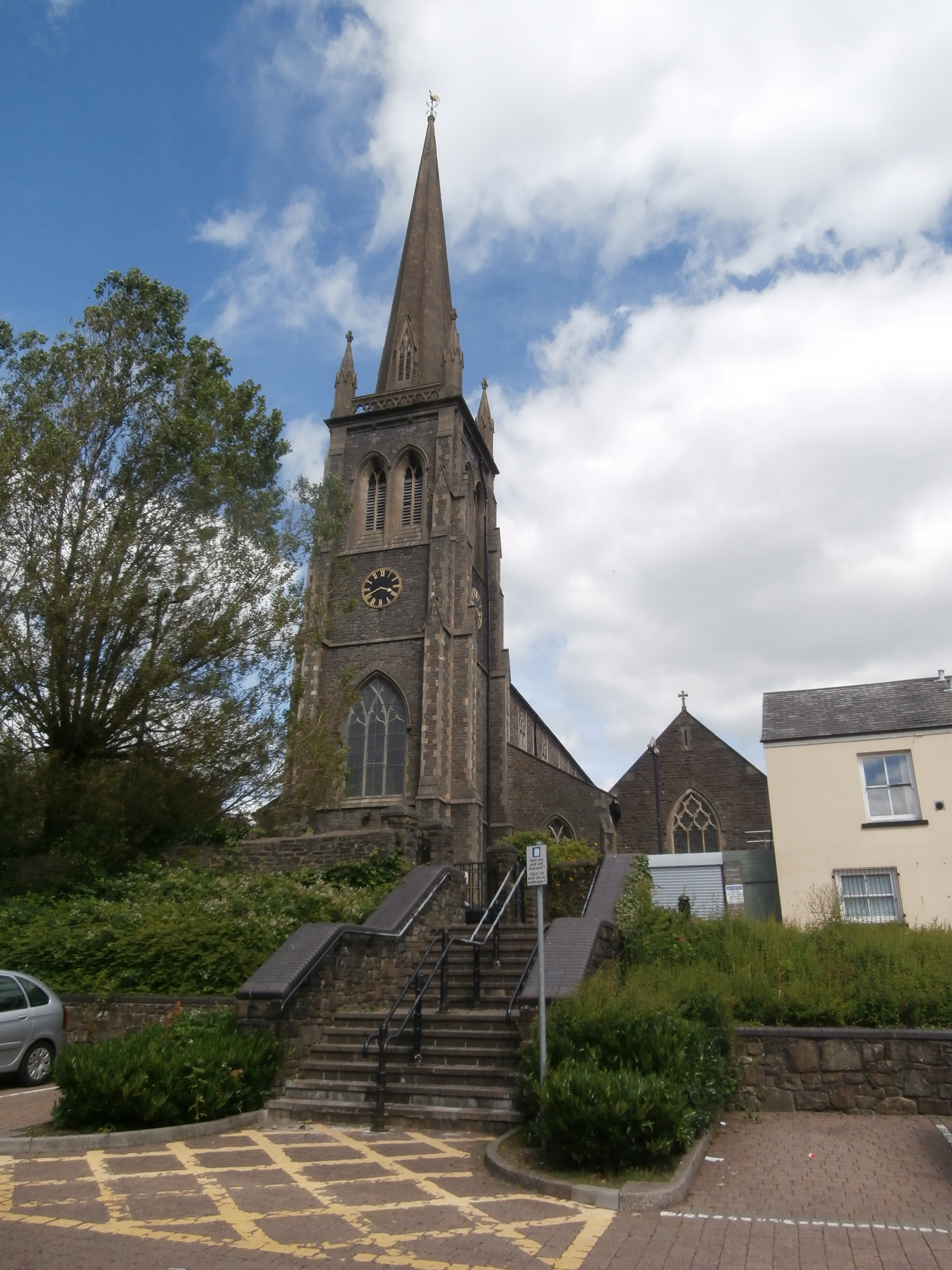
St Elvan's Church, Aberdare in July 2016

St Elvan's Church is a Grade II* listed Anglican church in the centre of the town of Aberdare. It was built in 1851–1852, largely at the instigation of John Griffith, vicar of Aberdare from 1847 until 1859.

On 11 December 1849 Griffith wrote at length to the Incorporated Church Building Society in relation to the position of the Church of England in the parish of Aberdare. The population of the parish was close to 14,000 people and increasing at a rate of approximately a thousand each year, yet the ancient parish church of St John's could accommodate fewer than two hundred people.

== Foundation ==
A campaign to build a new church at Aberdare was launched in 1850 when a public meeting was held, and within nine days a £1,000 had been raised by public subscription. By February 1851, subscriptions amounted to £2,500, just £500 short of the £3,000 that was deemed necessary to pay for the new building. Andrew Moseley was chosen as the architect to draw up the plans for the church. By February 1852, however, it was realised that insufficient funds were available and another campaign for public subscriptions took place. Within a few months, the work had been completed and St Elvan's Church was officially opened by services led by Alfred Ollivant, Bishop of Llandaff, on 30 September 1852. Special trains were laid on from Cardiff, Swansea and Neath, among other place, to mark the occasion. The congregation included strong representation from the gentry families of Glamorgan, as well as schoolgirls from the school run at Dowlais by Lady Charlotte Guest, dressed in Welsh costume. St Elvan's was consecrated on 25 September 1854.

== Re-ordering ==
The interior of the church was re-ordered and redecorated by Stephen Dykes Bower in 1961.

== Official Website ==
The official website and accompanying social media for St Elvan's Church is available at https://www.stelvans.com

== Sources ==
- Jones, Ieuan Gwynedd (1987). Communities. Essays in the Social History of Victorian Wales. Llandysul: Gomer. ISBN 0-86383-223-7.
- Wills, Wilton D. (1969). "The Rev. John Griffith and the revival of the established church in nineteenth century Glamorgan" (PDF). Morgannwg. 13: 75–102.
