= St Fagan's Church, Trecynon =

Church in Rhondda Cynon Taf, Wales

Coordinates: 51°43′25″N 3°27′35″W

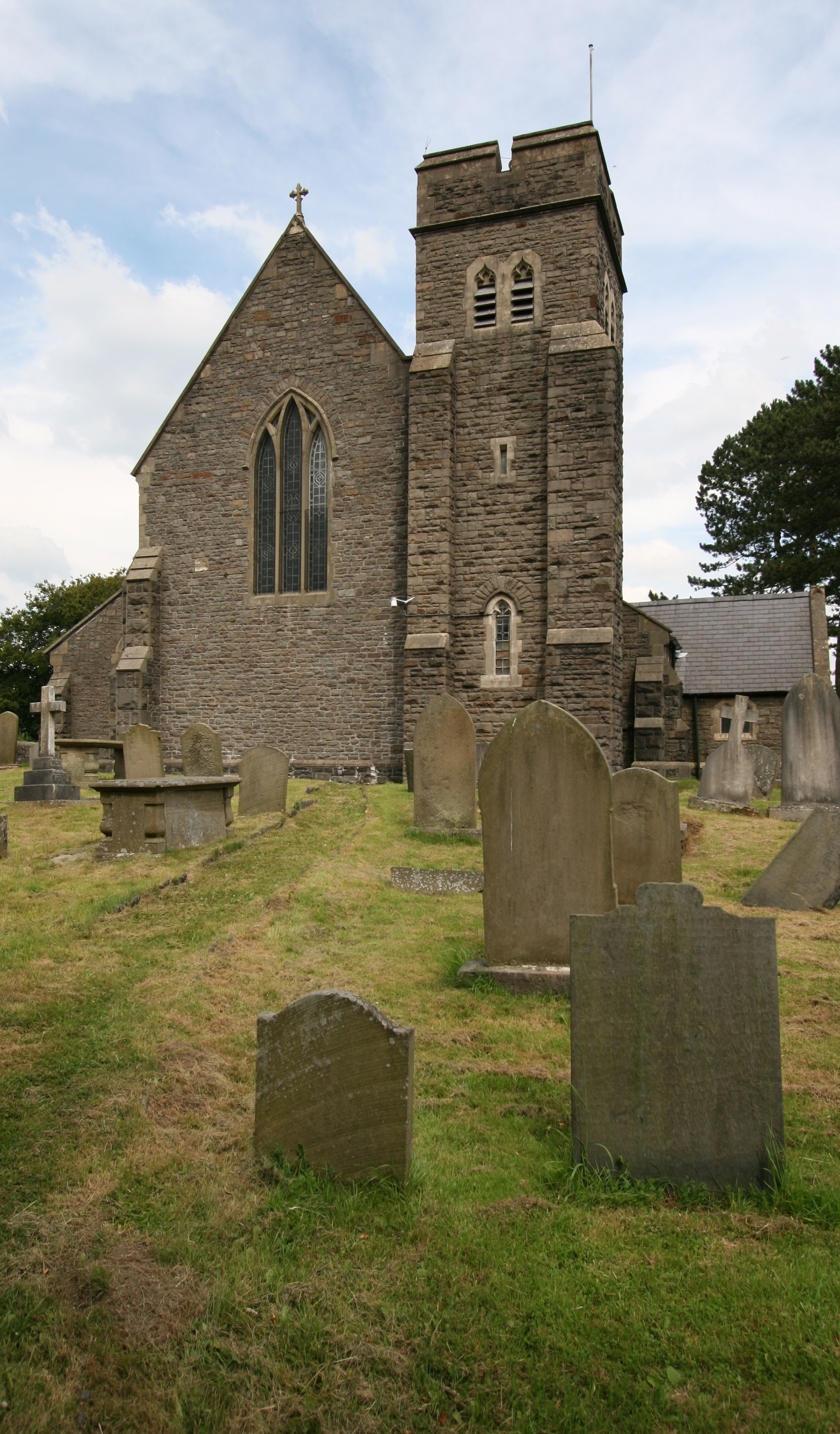
St Fagan's Church

St Fagan's Church (Welsh: Eglwys Sain Ffagan) is a Grade II-listed Anglican church in the village of Trecynon near Aberdare, Rhondda Cynon Taf, Wales. It was originally built in the mid-nineteenth century in the Gothic Revival style, but burned down a few years later and was rebuilt.

== History ==
The church was designed by the architect Thomas Talbot Bury of London (a former pupil of A. W. N. Pugin) and built between 1851 and 1853 at a cost of £1,795. However, it burnt down on 12 January 1856 and had to be rebuilt at a cost of £5,000. Both of these costs were met by Lady Harriet Clive (by 1856 widowed and known as Harriet Windsor-Clive, Baroness Windsor) of St Fagans Castle near Cardiff.

The building had a southwest tower added in 1909. It received a heritage listing of Grade II on 1 October 1991.

In March 2007 the church made the national news headlines when the vicar Rev. Paul Bennett, who lived in the Vicarage behind the church, was found stabbed to death in the churchyard. Bennett had taken the services in the three parish churches and played the church organ too. 500 people attended his funeral at the church on 3 April 2007. His killer had had paranoid schizophrenia and had lived in a flat overlooking the churchyard.

== Description ==
The church, in a Decorated Gothic style, has snecked Duffryn rubble walls with bath stone dressings, stepped buttresses with a slate roof, gables with parapets and crucifix finials. The interior has an aisled four-bay nave and a three-bay chancel with circular columns.
