= List of twin towns and sister cities in the United Kingdom =

This is a list of places in the United Kingdom having standing links to local communities in other countries. In most cases, the association, especially when formalised by local government, is known as "town twinning" (though other terms, such as "partner towns" or "sister cities" are sometimes used instead), and while most of the places included are towns, the list also includes villages, cities, districts, counties, etc. with similar links.

== Northern Ireland ==
Antrim and Newtownabbey

- Dorsten, Germany
- Gilbert, United States
- Rybnik, Poland

Ards and North Down

- Virginia Beach, United States

Armagh

- Razgrad, Bulgaria

Ballymena

- Gibraltar, Gibraltar
- Morehead, United States

Ballymoney

- Douglas, Isle of Man
- Vanves, France

Ballynahinch

- Lamorlaye, France

Banbridge

- Ruelle-sur-Touvre, France

Bangor

- Bregenz, Austria
- Virginia Beach, United States

Belfast

- Boston, United States
- Hefei, China
- Nashville, United States
- Shenyang, China

Carrickfergus

- Anderson, United States
- Danville, United States
- Jackson, United States
- Portsmouth, United States
- Ruda Śląska, Poland

Coleraine

- La Roche-sur-Yon, France

Cookstown

- Plérin, France
- Wronki, Poland

Craigavon

- LaGrange, United States

Downpatrick

- Bezons, France

Dromore

- Drumore Township, United States

Enniskillen terminated its twinning.

Larne

- Clover, United States

Limavady

- Vigneux-sur-Seine, France
- (Republic of Ireland) Westport, Ireland

Newcastle

- (Republic of Ireland) New Ross, Ireland

Newry, Mourne and Down

- Aberdeen, United States
- (Republic of Ireland) County Clare, Ireland
- Pinehurst, United States
- Sioux Falls, United States
- Southern Pines, United States

Newtownards

- Kemi, Finland

Omagh terminated its twinning.

Rathfriland

- Armstrong, Canada
