= Neil Davies (rugby league) =

Wales international dual code rugby footballer

Personal information
- Full name: Neil Davies
- Born: 4 December 1980 (age 45) Aberdare, Wales

Playing information

Rugby union
Club
Years	Team	Pld	T	G	FG	P
	Narberth RFC

Rugby league
- Position: Second-row
Club
Years	Team	Pld	T	G	FG	P
	Cardiff Demons
2004–05	Aberavon Fighting Irish
	Total	0	0	0	0	0
Representative
Years	Team	Pld	T	G	FG	P
2004–05	Wales	1(2?)

Neil Davies (4 December 1980) is a Welsh professional rugby league and rugby union footballer who played in the 2000s. He played representative level rugby league (RL) for Wales, Wales Students, Wales Dragonhearts and West Wales, and at club level for Cardiff Demons, Aberavon Fighting Irish and Celtic Crusaders (Colts), as a second-row, and club level rugby union (RU) for Narberth RFC.

== Background ==
Neil Davies was born in Aberdare, Wales.

== International honours ==
Neil Davies won a cap for Wales while at Aberavon Fighting Irish 2004...2005 1(2?)-caps + 2-caps (interchange/substitute).
