= Aberdare School Board =

The Aberdare School Board was formed in 1871 and consisted of thirteen members elected for a period of three years. It was abolished, along with other School Boards in 1902 and its responsibilities transferred to Glamorgan County Council.

In the main, the members were local industrialists, tradesmen, nonconformist ministers. In later years, this changed to include a smattering of working men,

== The 1871-74 School Board ==
In late 1870 a vestry meeting was held at Aberdare, presided over by the rector of Aberdare, John David Jenkins, where it was agreed, on the proposal of Rev Thomas Price, seconded by Rees Hopkin Rhys, that a School Board be elected as soon as possible. Rev David Price, Siloa, hoped that there would be no contest. ‘A contest’, he argued, ‘would be productive of personal feeling besides being expensive and full of turmoil. It would also rouse a feeling of denominationalism, and he wished that to be entirely sunk. They should forget the sects in their regard for the general objects of the movement, and elect members for fitness alone.’

The first elections were held in 1871. Initially, 42 candidates were nominated for the election. Many withdrew before the poll but the election was still contested by twenty-three candidates. Of these, six were nonconformist ministers, five colliery agents, managers or proprietors. The first election was a contest between religious bodies but, as one local newspaper noted, none had reason to be disappointed with the result.

James Lewis, who had topped the poll, was proposed by Thomas Price as first chairman of the School Board. Price himself became vice chairman.

The first six months in the history of the Board were uneventful, in contrast to other places. In neighbouring Merthyr Tydfil, for example, the nonconformists were in a minority and a bye-law was passed, supported by the Anglicans and Roman Catholics, to endow their schools.

In 1874 ministers were reduced to three out of fifteen candidates, there were again five colliery officials, and the rest were publicans and drapers. In the 1880s, the pattern is clearer. Apart from David Morgan, the Aberdare miners' agent who topped the poll, the 1886 list included four influential figures connected with the coal industry, five ministers of various denominations, four grocers, two merchants and a solicitor.

By 1889 the Board was responsible for the administration of fourteen schools with accommodation for 1,749 pupils.

== The 1874-77 School Board ==
Only three members of the current Board, namely James Lewis, Thomas Price and David Rees Davies, the latter of whom was defeated.

The new Board is composed of gentlemen of talent, education, energy, and experience in practical work of various kinds, all of which combine to fit them for the duties which they have been selected to fulfill. If the qualifications we have enumerated are brought to bear upon the duties of the Board, three years hence the electors will not regret the choice just made. Aberdare is happily free from the bitter controversies which have been connected with School Board elections in various parts of the United Kingdom. With us there has, on the present occasion, been less of the sectarian spirit than even the little which showed itself three years ago.

At the end of its term of office the School Board published its triennial report. James Lewis also announced that he would not seek re-election.

== The 1880-83 School Board ==
Working men candidates had been elected to School Boards in the late 1870s, notably William Abraham (Mabon) in the Rhondda. However, there was no conscious effort in Aberdare until 1883 when two working men candidates, David Morgan, miners’ agent, and Isaac Jones were nominated by the local miners’ association. This was the one occasion when there was no contested election, and following a ratepayers’ meeting, Morgan was returned. This appears to be the first occasion when a working man was elected to a public body in the Aberdare Valley (Pretty 2001, 508).

== The 1886-89 School Board ==
A feature of this election was a change in personnel with a number of sitting members being defeated. The vicar topped the poll.

The miners were sufficiently well organised to make a determined attempt to increase their representation and a vote was held to choose two additional candidates to contest the election alongside David Morgan.

== Bibliography ==
- Parry, Jon (1989). "Labour Leaders and Local Politics 1888–1902: The Example of Aberdare". Welsh History Review. 14 (3): 399–416.
