= Y Gwladgarwr =

Defunct Welsh language newspaper

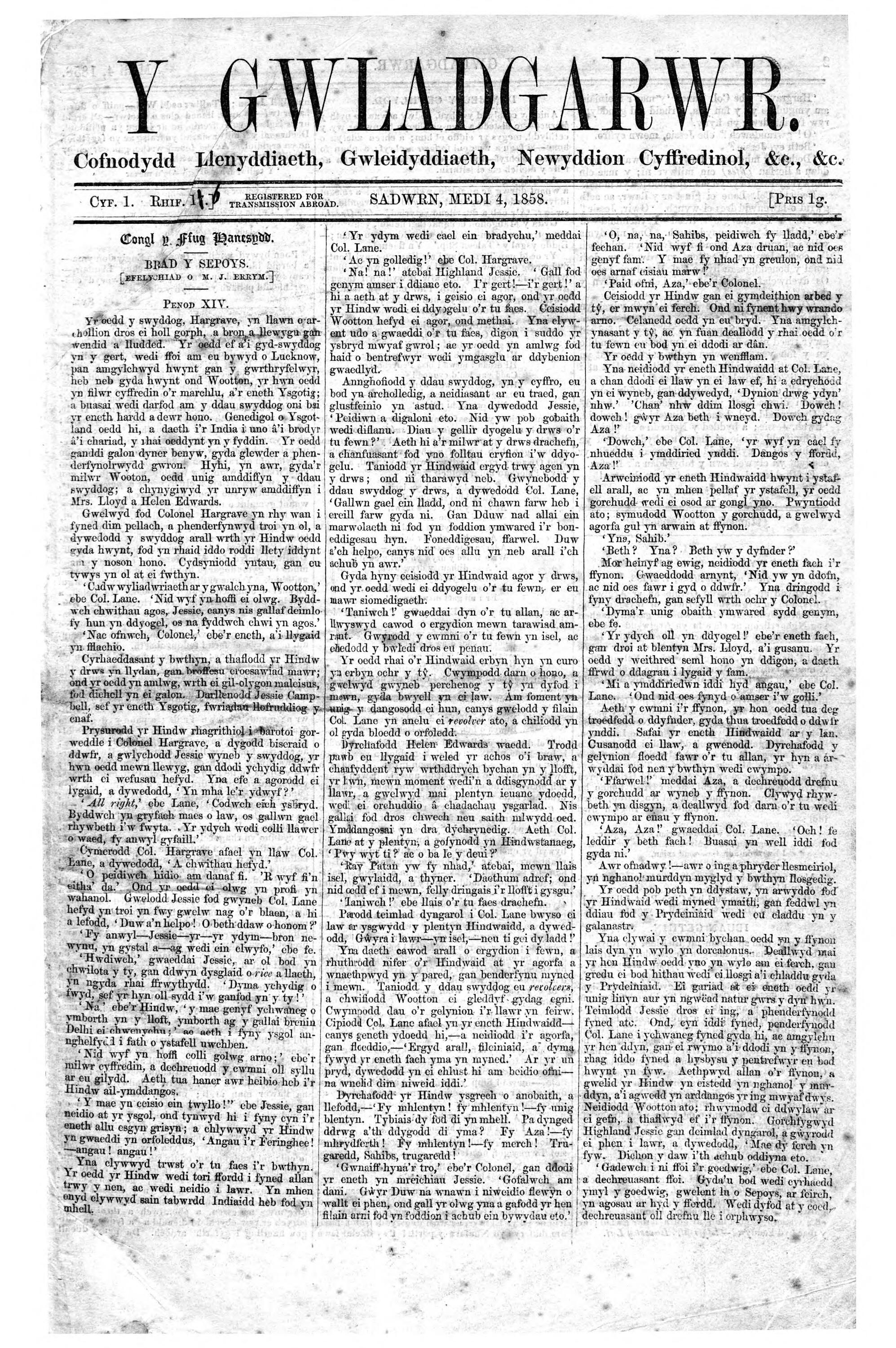
- Type: weekly newspaper
- City: Aberdare

Y Gwladgarwr ("The Patriot") was a liberal Welsh language newspaper, established in 1858, published weekly in Aberdare by Abraham Mason, and distributed around the districts of South Wales. Devoted to Welsh literature, the paper provided poets and authors of the valleys and South Wales more generally with a means of publishing their works. Amongst the newspaper's poetry editors were William Williams (bardic name Caledfryn, 1801–1869) and William Thomas (bardic name Islwyn, 1832–1878).

Welsh Newspapers Online has digitised 1,266 issues of the Y Gwladgarwr (1858–1884) from the newspaper holdings of the National Library of Wales.
