= David Davis, Blaengwawr =

Welsh coal businessman (1797–1866)

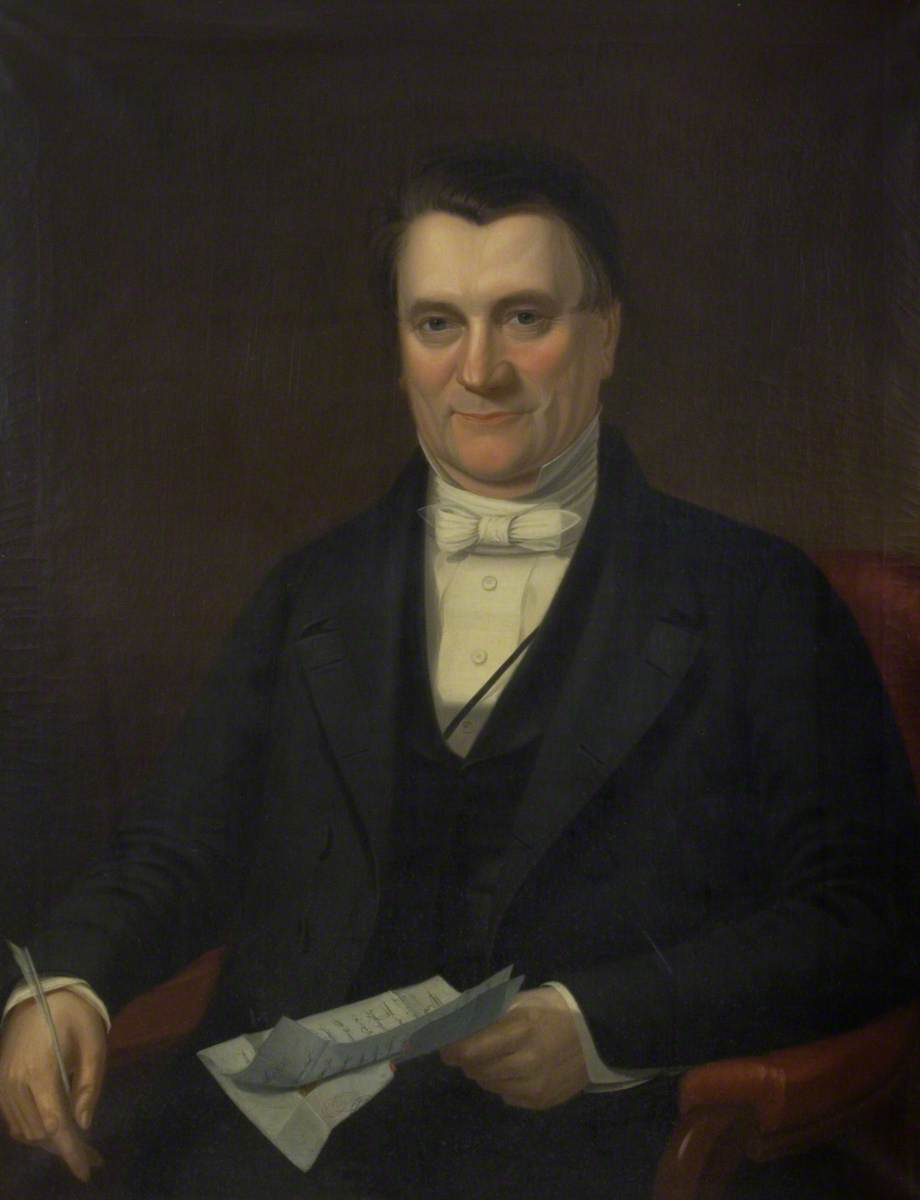

David Davis, Blaengwawr (1797 – 19 May 1866), was a leading figure in the South Wales coal industry and a founder of the steam coal trade.

David Davis was born in Llanddeusant, Carmarthenshire, in 1797. At a young age, he went to Merthyr Tydfil, where he served an apprenticeship with a relative before opening his own business at Hirwaun. The business was successful and he soon became involved in small scale mining at Rhigos. This colliery (with its wharf at Briton Ferry near Neath) was sold in 1847, but by that time Davis had taken a lease of valuable steam-coal seams on the Blaengwawr estate at Aberaman. He sank a pit therein 1843, and transported the coal to Cardiff on the Glamorganshire Canal until the Taff Vale Railway was opened in 1847. At this time, Davis moved from Hirwaun to a house that he built at Blaengwawr. He also built another house, Maesyffynnon, for his son, David, who joined him in the business. Another son, Lewis, became sales agent in Cardiff.

Davis was an active Wesleyan and, in 1837, was instrumental in the building of a new chapel at Soar, Hirwaun to replace an older chapel that was turned into cottages. When Davis moved the main focus of his business operation from Hirwaun to Blaengwawr he encouraged a number of his workmen to follow him, and he established the Wesleyan Chapel at Aberdare, which was largely frequented by his employees.

In later life, Davis turned his attention to the Rhondda Fach valley, which at that time was almost entirely rural and uninhabited. After costly but at first unsuccessful sinkings, he finally struck a good seam at Ferndale. Early in 1866, with his four sons, he established 'Davis and Sons'. This enterprise prospered and was converted into a limited liability company, with a prospectus published inviting the public to subscribe for debentures and shares in May 1890. This successful flotation was organized by Robert William Perks.

David Davis was also active in public life as a member of the Aberdare Local Board of Health.

David Davis was a good example of a self-made Welsh coal owner. He died on 18 May 1866 and was buried at St John's Cemetery, Aberdare.

== Sources ==
=== Books ===
- Jones, Alan Vernon (2004). Chapels of the Cynon Valley. Cynon Valley Historical Society. ISBN 0953107612.

=== Journals ===
- Jones, Ieuan Gwynedd (1964). "Dr. Thomas Price and the election of 1868 in Merthyr Tydfil : a study in nonconformist politics (Part One)". Welsh History Review. 2 (2): 147–172.
- Turner, Christopher B. (1984). "Religious revivalism and Welsh Industrial Society: Aberdare in 1859" (PDF). Llafur: The Journal of the Society for the Study of Welsh Labour History. 4 (1): 4–13.
