= Merthyr Tydfil by-election, 1888 =

The Merthyr Tydfil by-election, 1888 could refer to:

- March 1888 Merthyr Tydfil by-election
- October 1888 Merthyr Tydfil by-election
