= Henry Richard =

British politician (1812–1888)

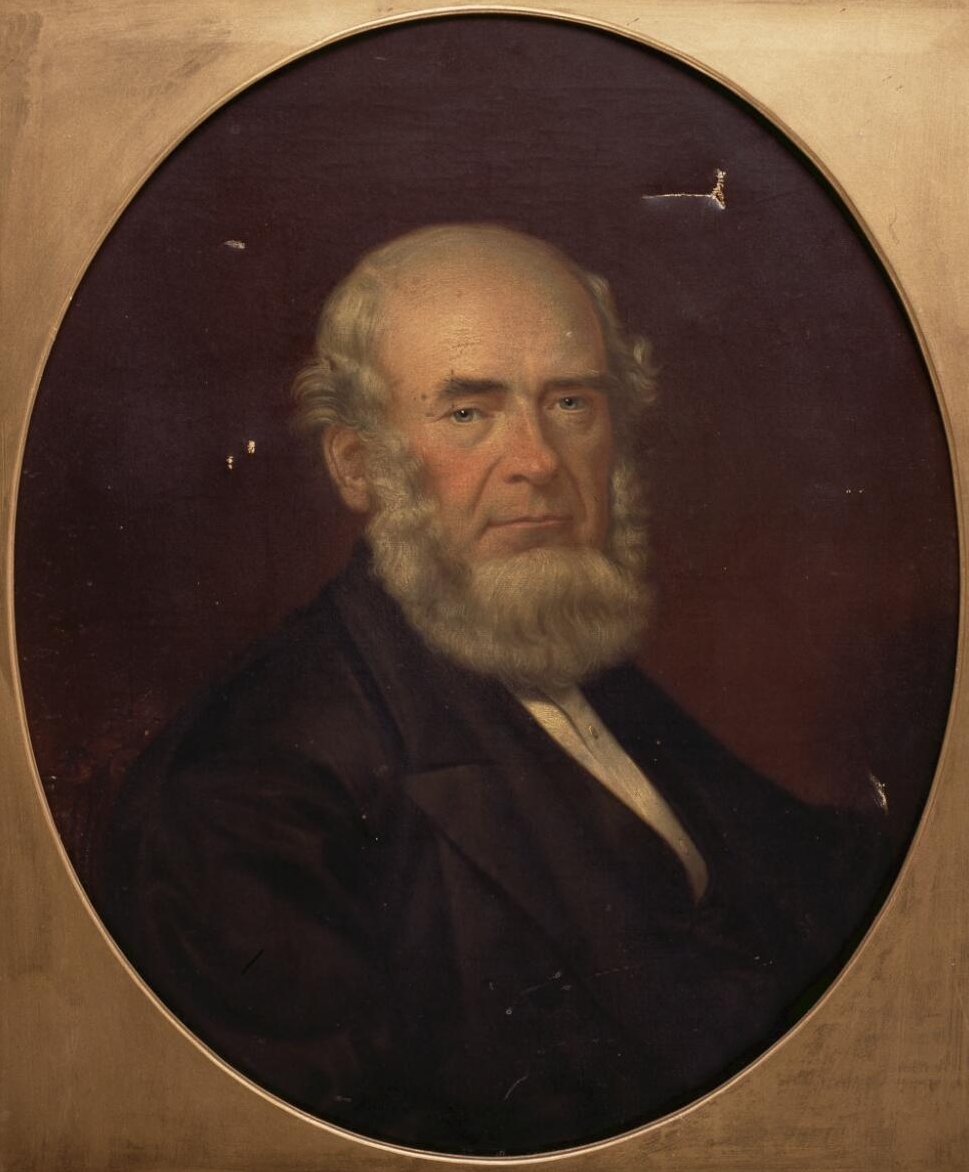
Portrait of Henry Richard in 1870

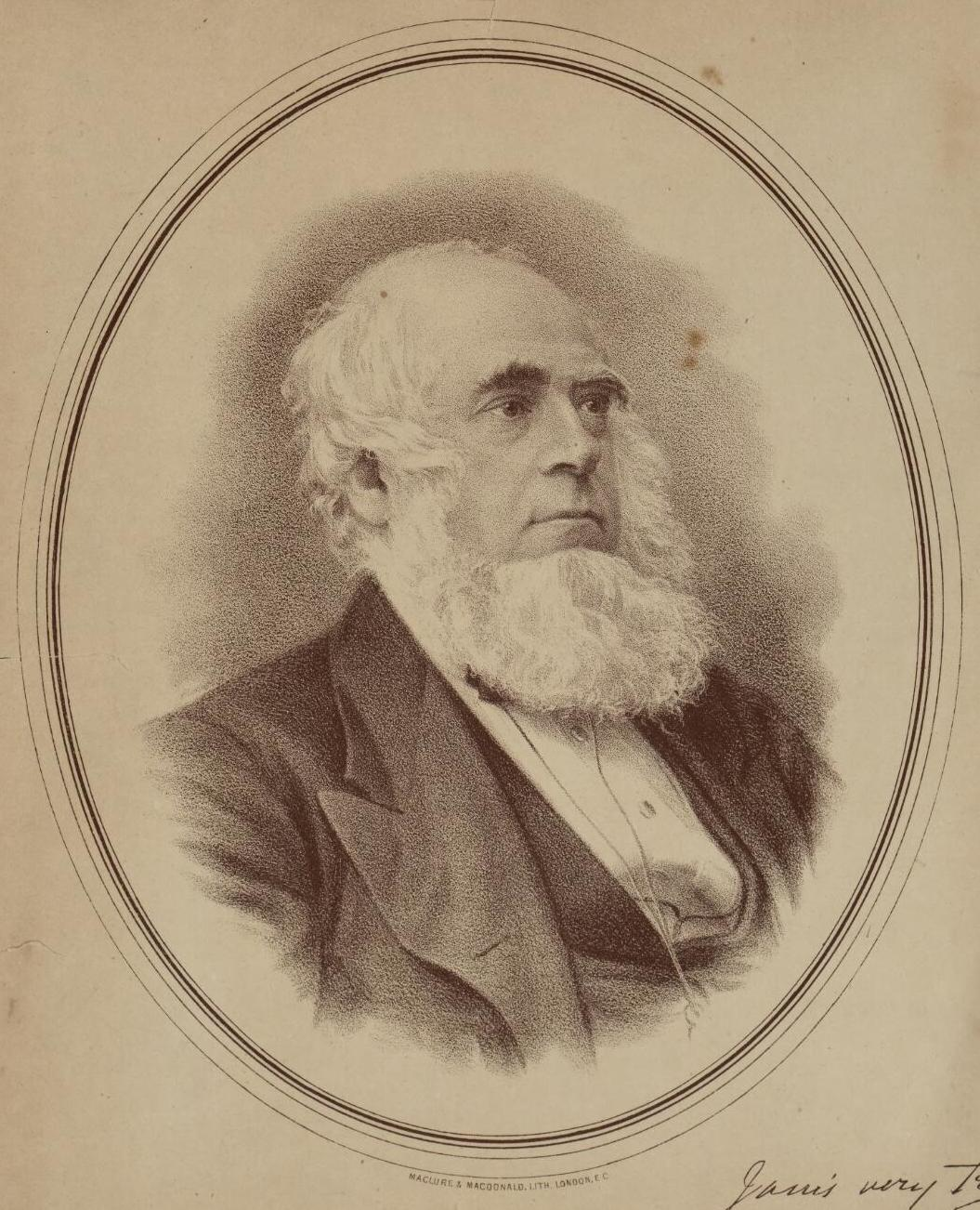
Portrait of Henry Richard in 1877

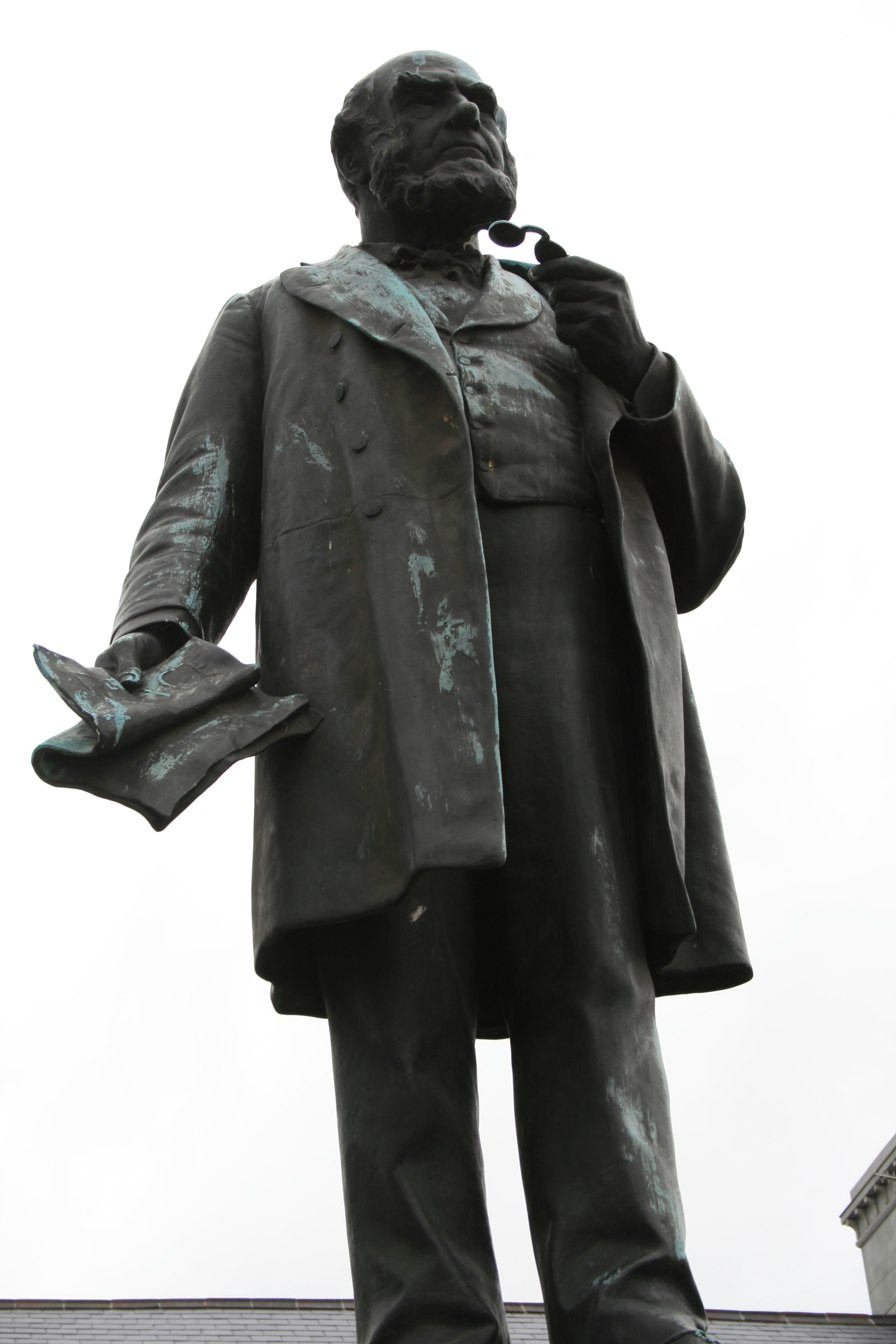
Statue of Henry Richard in Tregaron by Albert Toft

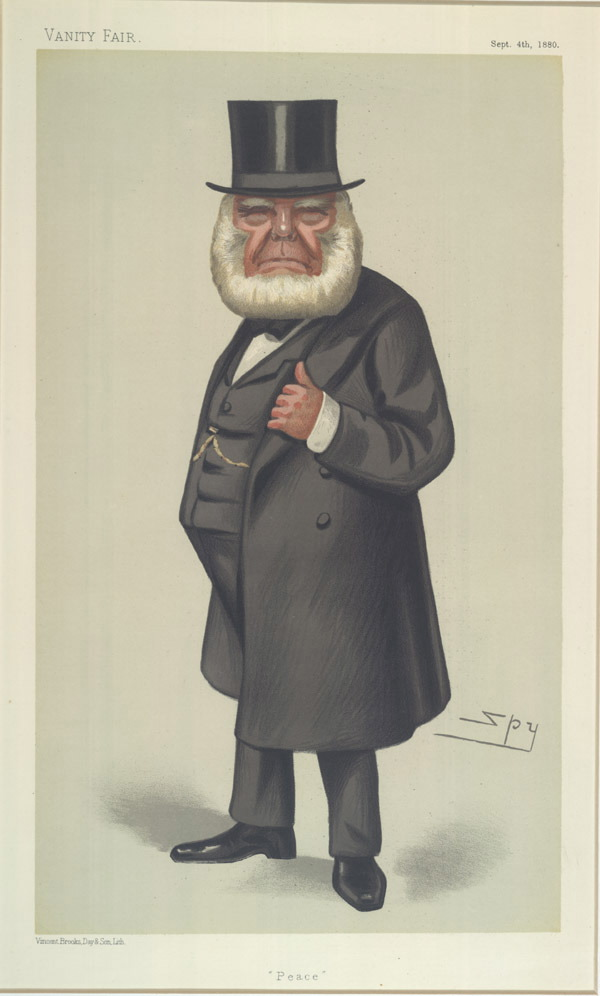
"Peace". Caricature by Spy published in Vanity Fair in 1880

Henry Richard (3 April 1812 – 20 August 1888) was a Congregational minister and Welsh Member of Parliament between 1868–1888. Richard was an advocate of peace and international arbitration, as secretary of the Peace Society for forty years (1848–1884). His other interests included anti-slavery work.

== Early life ==
Born in 1812 in Tregaron, Ceredigion, he was the second son of Ebenezer Richard (1781–1837), a Calvinistic Methodist minister. He was educated initially at Llangeitho grammar school, and attended Highbury College, near London, to obtain qualifications for the ministry.

In 1835, after ordination Richard was appointed pastor at the Congregational Marlborough Chapel, in the Old Kent Road, London. Its foundation stone had been laid by Thomas Wilson in 1826. Richard succeeded Thomas Hughes, and raised sufficient funds to pay off the chapel's building loans and establish a school (British School, Oakley Place).

== Secretary of the Peace Society ==
Richard resigned in 1850 to devote himself full-time as secretary to the Peace Society, it was a post he had undertaken two years earlier on a part-time basis. He helped organize a series of congresses in the capitals of Europe, and was partly instrumental in securing the insertion of a declaration in favour of arbitration in the treaty of Paris in 1856. Through this work he became universally known in Europe and the United States until his resignation in 1885.

== Early political career ==
During the early 1860s, Richard became a leading figure in the Liberation Society, whose main aim was the disestablishment of the Anglican Church. The Society increasingly focused its attentions on Richard's native Wales and sought to contest parliamentary elections. While Richard's published writings were critical of the landed gentry's influence over political life in Wales, he did nevertheless recognize that the deferential attitudes of those who held the vote at parliamentary elections would be a barrier to any potential political breakthrough. Indeed, in Cardiganshire, levels of support for the Liberation Society (at least in terms of financial contributions) were low. The lack of a political aspect to the county's nonconformity was illustrated at the 1865 general election when Richard briefly emerged as a potential Liberal candidate for Cardiganshire.

=== 1865 general election ===
The sitting member for Cardiganshire, William Thomas Rowland Powell, had indicated some twelve months prior to the election that he would retire and Sir Thomas Lloyd of Bronwydd had been selected as the Liberal candidate. However, when Powell reversed his decision, Lloyd issued an address stating that he would not oppose the sitting member. As a result, both Richard and David Davies Llandinam offered themselves as candidates. On his arrival in Cardiganshire, Richard immediately visited Gogerddan to seek the views of the Pryse family and, as a result announced his candidature. The influence of Gogerddan was very strong in Aberystwyth and throughout the north of the county, and also particularly hostile to David Davies. Their support for Richard was influenced by their hostility towards Davies.

A selection meeting was arranged to be held at Aberaeron, but shortly before this took place, Powell again announced his retirement. Richard's agents visited Bronwydd to ascertain Lloyd's intentions and, on understanding that Lloyd would now fight the seat after all, Richard withdrew in his favour. David Davies, however, did not withdraw and in his speech accepting nomination was particularly critical of Richard's decision to withdraw. Davies came within 361 votes of victory.

== 1868 general election ==
In 1868 Henry Richard was elected Liberal member of parliament for the Merthyr boroughs in South Wales.

=== Member of Parliament ===
Following his election, Richard become known as one of the foremost nonconformists in the House of Commons. Here he was a leading member of the party which advocated the removal of Nonconformist grievances and the disestablishment of the church in Wales.

== Chairman of the Congregational Union ==
In 1877, Richard was appointed chairman of the Congregational Union of England and Wales.

== Author and journalist ==
Among Richard's writings may be mentioned:

- Defensive War (1846 and 1890)
- The Recent Progress of International Arbitration (1884) on the subject of peace and conflict
- Memoirs of Joseph Sturge (1864) in memory of the abolitionist and founder of the mid-nineteenth century Anti-Slavery Society, the Society for Effecting the Abolition of the Slave Trade;
- Letters on the Social and Political Condition of the Principality of Wales (1866 and 1884) reflecting his love of Wales;

He also prepared some of the material for the life of his friend and associate, Richard Cobden, which was written by John Morley, later Lord Morley.

In the field of journalism he contributed to the Morning Star and the Evening Star.

== Abolitionist ==
Less well known for his anti-slavery work and unable to support the American Civil War as an appropriate means to end slavery, Henry Richard was nevertheless respected in this field. Indeed, a few weeks after his death, the British and Foreign Anti-Slavery Society (now Anti-Slavery International), published an obituary in their journal, the Anti-Slavery Reporter.

== Death and memorials ==
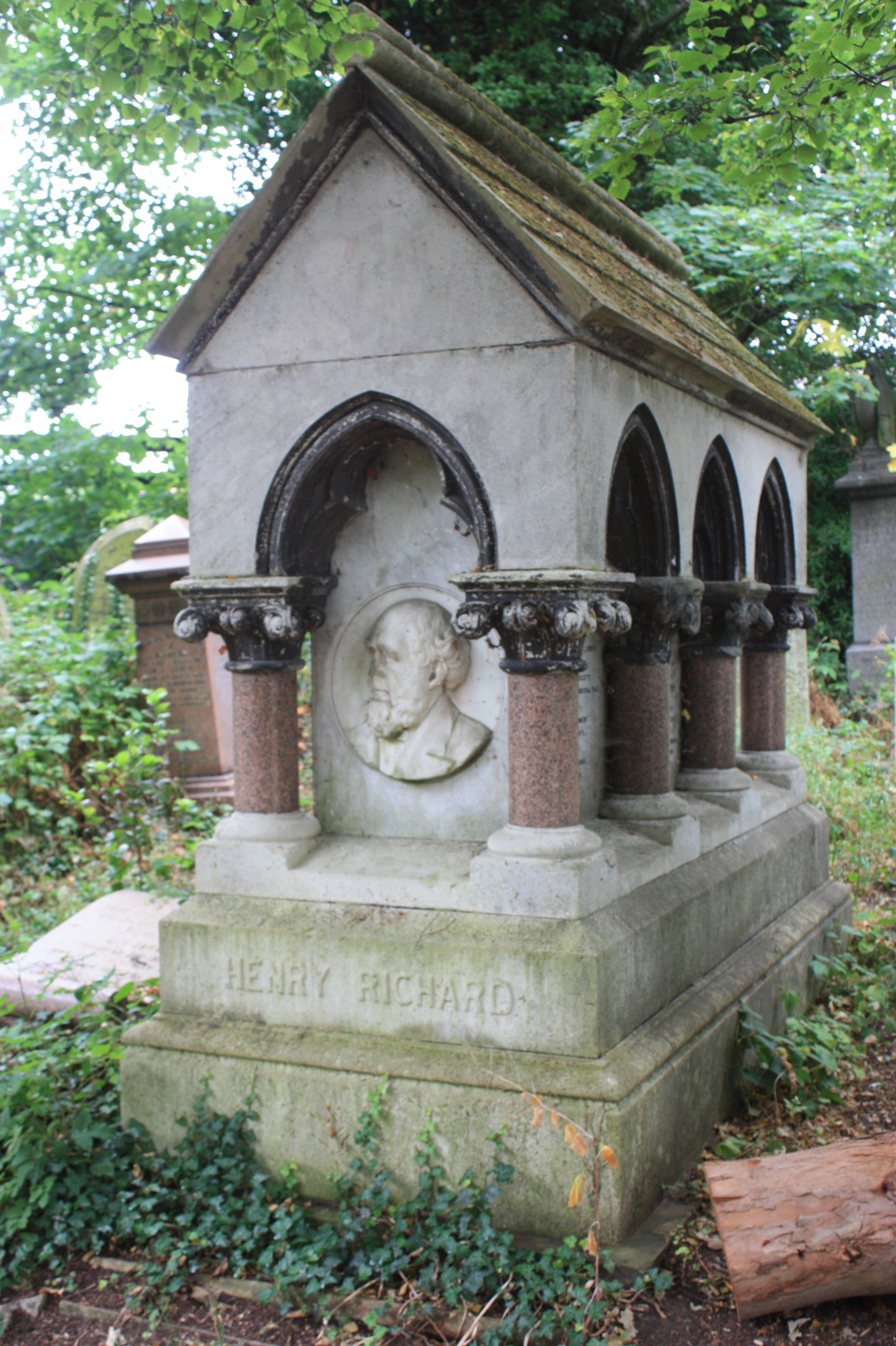
The grave of Henry Richard, Abney Park Cemetery, London

Richard died suddenly of heart disease on 20 August 1888 at the home of the Lord Lieutenant of Anglesey in Treborth, near Bangor. His body was brought to his London residence in Bolton Gardens, South Kensington, where it lay in state until his funeral on 31 August.

His imposing white stone and marble tomb in the form of a shrine with its own gabled roof, replete with his carved portrait, was erected by public subscription in 1891 over his grave at the Congregationalist model non-denominational garden cemetery, Abney Park Cemetery, Stoke Newington, London. The grave lies on an eastern path not far from the southern entrance. His wife Augusta Matilda lies with him.

The equally imposing Henry Richard Memorial statue which dominates the Square at Tregaron was designed by Albert Toft and unveiled by Sir George Osborne Morgan on 18 August 1893. The inscription on the plinth reads:

Born here in Tregaron, he was educated for the Christian ministry, and in 1835 he was ordained in London. In 1848 he was appointed Secretary to the Peace Society, gaining an international reputation as "The Apostle of Peace." In 1868 he became M.P. for the Merthyr constituency: and such was his concern for Welsh affairs that he became known as "the Member for Wales." He was also a prominent pioneer in education: he served on several commissions of enquiry and in 1883 he became the first vice-president of Cardiff University College.

I have always been mindful of three things:—Not to forget the language of my country; and the people and cause of my country; and to neglect no opportunity of defending the character and promoting the interests of my country.

My hope for the abatement of the war system lies in the permanent conviction of the people, rather than the policies of cabinets or the discussions of parliaments.

— Henry Richard Memorial statue

== See also ==
- List of peace activists

== General and cited references ==
=== Books and journals ===
- Appleton, L. (1899). Memoirs of Henry Richard. London: Trubner.
- Articles in Cymru Fydd The Anti-Slavery Reporter for 1888.
- Gwyn Griffiths (2012). Henry Richard, Apostle of Peace and Welsh Patriot.
- Jones, Ieuan Gwynedd (1964). "Cardiganshire Politics in the Mid-Nineteenth Century" (PDF). Ceredigion. 5 (1): 14–41.
- Jones, Ieuan Gwynedd (1965). "Dr Thomas Price and the Election of 1868 in Merthyr Tydfil: A Study in Nonconformist Politics (Part Two)". Welsh History Review. 2 (3): 251–70.
- Jones, Ieuan Gwynedd (1981). Explorations and Explanations: Essays in the Social History of Victorian Wales. Llandysul: Gomer. ISBN 0850886449.
- Miall, Charles S. (1899). Henry Richard, M.P.: A Biography. London: Cassell.
- D. Ben Rees (2007). The Life and Work of Henry Richard. Nottingham, UK.

Attribution

- This article incorporates text from a publication now in the public domain: Lee, Sidney, ed. (1896). "Richard, Henry". Dictionary of National Biography. Vol. 48. London: Smith, Elder & Co.

Parliament of the United Kingdom
Preceded by Henry Bruce	Member of Parliament for Merthyr Tydfil; 1868–1888; With: Richard Fothergill to 1880; Charles James to 1888; D. A. Thomas 1888	Succeeded by William Pritchard-Morgan; D. A. Thomas
Media offices
Preceded by William Haly	Editor of the Morning Star; 1857; With: John Hamilton	Succeeded by Baxter Langley
