= Edgar Jones (politician) =

British politician (1878–1962)

Sir Edgar Rees Jones KBE MP
- Jones in about 1910

Member of Parliament for Merthyr Merthyr Tydfil (1910-1918)
- In office 1910 – 26 October 1922

Personal details
- Born: 27 August 1878 Gorwel, Rhondda, Wales
- Died: 16 June 1962 (aged 83)
- Party: Liberal Party (until 1918); Coalition Liberal (after 1918)

Sir Edgar Rees Jones KBE MP (27 August 1878 – 16 June 1962) was a Welsh barrister and Liberal Party politician. He was the Member of Parliament (MP) for Merthyr Tydfil from 1910 to 1918, and then for Merthyr from 1918 to 1922. During World War I he served as head of the Priorities Division of the Ministry of Munitions.

== Biography ==
=== Early life and background ===
Edgar Rees Jones was born on 27 August 1878, the son of the Baptist minister Morgan Humphrey Jones and Margaret Ann Jones of Gorwel, Rhondda. A Welsh speaker, he was educated in law at the University of Wales and Cardiff University College, receiving his Bachelor of Arts degree in 1900 and Master of Arts degree in 1903; his MA thesis was on "Political theories in England in the Seventeenth Century". In September 1919, he married Lillian Eleanor May, daughter of George Brackley. He was known to reside at 28 Westminster Mansions, Great Smith Street, Westminster.

=== Career ===
Jones came to prominence during David Lloyd George's education revolt campaign in 1903, and was elected at the January 1910 general election as one of the two Members of Parliament for Merthyr Tydfil. He held that seat until the constituency was abolished at the 1918 general election, when he was elected as a Coalition Liberal for the new Merthyr division. He did not stand for re-election in 1922, and although he stood in Salford South in 1923 and Gower in 1931, he never returned to the House of Commons.

He was once a civil servant in the Ministry of Munitions and served as head of the Priorities Division of this ministry during World War I. He was chairman of the National Food Canning Council (NFCC).

Along with fellow Coalition Liberal Lewis Haslam of the Newport constituency, Jones played a minor role in the discussions behind the Government of Ireland Bill. Haslam in particular was strongly opposed to giving the Irish Parliament control of its own taxes.

Parliament of the United Kingdom
Preceded by D. A. Thomas; Keir Hardie	Member of Parliament for Merthyr Tydfil; 1910–1918; With: Keir Hardie to 1915; Charles Stanton from 1915	Constituency abolished
New constituency	Member of Parliament for Merthyr; 1918–1922	Succeeded by R. C. Wallhead
