= March 1888 Merthyr Tydfil by-election =

UK parliamentary by-election in Wales

The March 1888 Merthyr Tydfil by-election was a parliamentary by-election held for the UK House of Commons constituency of Merthyr Tydfil in Wales on 14 March 1888.

== Vacancy ==
The by-election was caused by the resignation of the sitting Liberal MP, Charles James who was appointed the Steward of the Manor of Northstead.

== Candidates ==
The only candidate nominated was industrialist David Alfred Thomas.

== Result ==
The Liberal Party held the constituency unopposed.

March 1888 Merthyr Tydfil by-election
Party	Candidate	Votes	%	±%
Liberal	David Alfred Thomas	Unopposed		
Registered electors				
Liberal hold				
