= Merthyr (UK Parliament constituency) =

UK Parliament constituency (1918–1950)

- Former borough constituency for the House of Commons

1918–1950
- Seats: one
- Created from: Merthyr Tydfil
- Replaced by: Merthyr Tydfil

Merthyr was a borough constituency centred on the town of Merthyr Tydfil in Wales. It returned one Member of Parliament (MP) to the House of Commons of the Parliament of the United Kingdom.

The constituency was created for the 1918 general election, and abolished for the 1950 general election, when it was largely replaced by the new constituency of Merthyr Tydfil.

== Members of Parliament ==
Election	Member	Party
1918	Edgar Rees Jones	Coalition Liberal
Jan 1922	Edgar Rees Jones	National Liberal
Nov 1922	R. C. Wallhead	Labour
1931	R. C. Wallhead	ILP
1933	R. C. Wallhead	Labour
1934 by-election	S. O. Davies	Labour
1950	constituency abolished: see Merthyr Tydfil	

== Election results ==
=== Elections in the 1910s ===
General election 1918: Merthyr
Party		Candidate	Votes	%
C	National Liberal	Edgar Rees Jones	14,127	52.7
	Labour	James Winstone	12,682	47.3
Majority			1,445	5.4
Turnout			26,809	76.5
Registered electors			35,049	
	National Liberal win (new seat)			
C indicates candidate endorsed by the coalition government.

=== Elections in the 1920s ===
General election 1922: Merthyr
Party	Candidate	Votes	%	±%
Labour	R. C. Wallhead	17,516	53.0	+5.7
Independent (National Liberal)	Richard Mathias (Note: Nominee of the local National Liberal association and supported by the Merthyr Conservative association)	15,552	47.0	–5.7
Majority		1,964	6.0	N/A
Turnout		33,068	90.6	+14.1
Registered electors		36,514		
Labour gain from National Liberal		Swing	+5.7	

General election 1923: Merthyr
Party	Candidate	Votes	%	±%
Labour	R. C. Wallhead	19,511	60.1	+7.1
Liberal	David Rowland Thomas	7,403	22.8	New
Unionist	Arthur Fox-Davies	5,548	17.1	New
Majority		12,108	37.3	+31.3
Turnout		32,462	86.8	−3.8
Registered electors		37,413		
Labour hold		Swing	N/A	

General election 1924: Merthyr
Party	Candidate	Votes	%	±%
Labour	R. C. Wallhead	19,882	59.8	−0.3
Unionist	Arthur Fox-Davies	13,383	40.2	+23.1
Majority		6,499	19.6	−17.7
Turnout		33,265	86.9	+0.1
Registered electors		38,276		
Labour hold		Swing	−11.7	

General election 1929: Merthyr
Party	Candidate	Votes	%	±%
Labour	R. C. Wallhead	22,701	59.6	−0.2
Liberal	James Jenkins	8,696	22.8	New
Unionist	Francis Bradley-Birt	6,712	17.6	−22.6
Majority		14,005	36.8	+17.2
Turnout		38,109	85.8	−1.1
Registered electors		44,408		
Labour hold		Swing		

=== Elections in the 1930s ===
General election 1931: Merthyr
Party	Candidate	Votes	%	±%
Ind. Labour Party	R. C. Wallhead	24,623	69.4	+9.8
New Party	Sellick Davies	10,834	30.6	New
Majority		13,789	38.8	N/A
Turnout		35,547	80.8	−5.0
Registered electors		43,908		
Ind. Labour Party gain from Labour		Swing	N/A	

1934 Merthyr by-election
Party	Candidate	Votes	%	±%
Labour	S. O. Davies	18,645	51.8	New
Liberal	Victor Evans	10,376	28.9	New
Ind. Labour Party	Campbell Stephen	3,508	9.8	−59.6
Communist	Wal Hannington	3,409	9.5	New
Majority		8,269	22.9	N/A
Turnout		35,938	81.1	+0.3
Registered electors		44,286		
Labour gain from Ind. Labour Party		Swing	+55.7	

General election 1935: Merthyr
Party	Candidate	Votes	%	±%
Labour	S. O. Davies	20,530	68.0	N/A
Ind. Labour Party	Claude Stanfield	9,640	32.0	−37.4
Majority		10,890	36.0	N/A
Turnout		30,170	68.8	−12.0
Registered electors		43,842		
Labour gain from Ind. Labour Party		Swing	N/A	

=== Elections in the 1940s ===
General election 1945: Merthyr
Party	Candidate	Votes	%	±%
Labour	S. O. Davies	24,879	81.4	+13.4
Independent Labour	Samuel Jennings	5,693	18.6	New
Majority		19,186	62.8	+36.8
Turnout		30,572	68.6	−0.2
Registered electors		44,540		
Labour hold		Swing	N/A	

== See also ==
- 1934 Merthyr by-election
