= 1934 Merthyr by-election =

UK parliamentary by-election

← 1931	5 June 1934	1935 →

Constituency of Merthyr
- Turnout: 81.1% (▲0.3%)
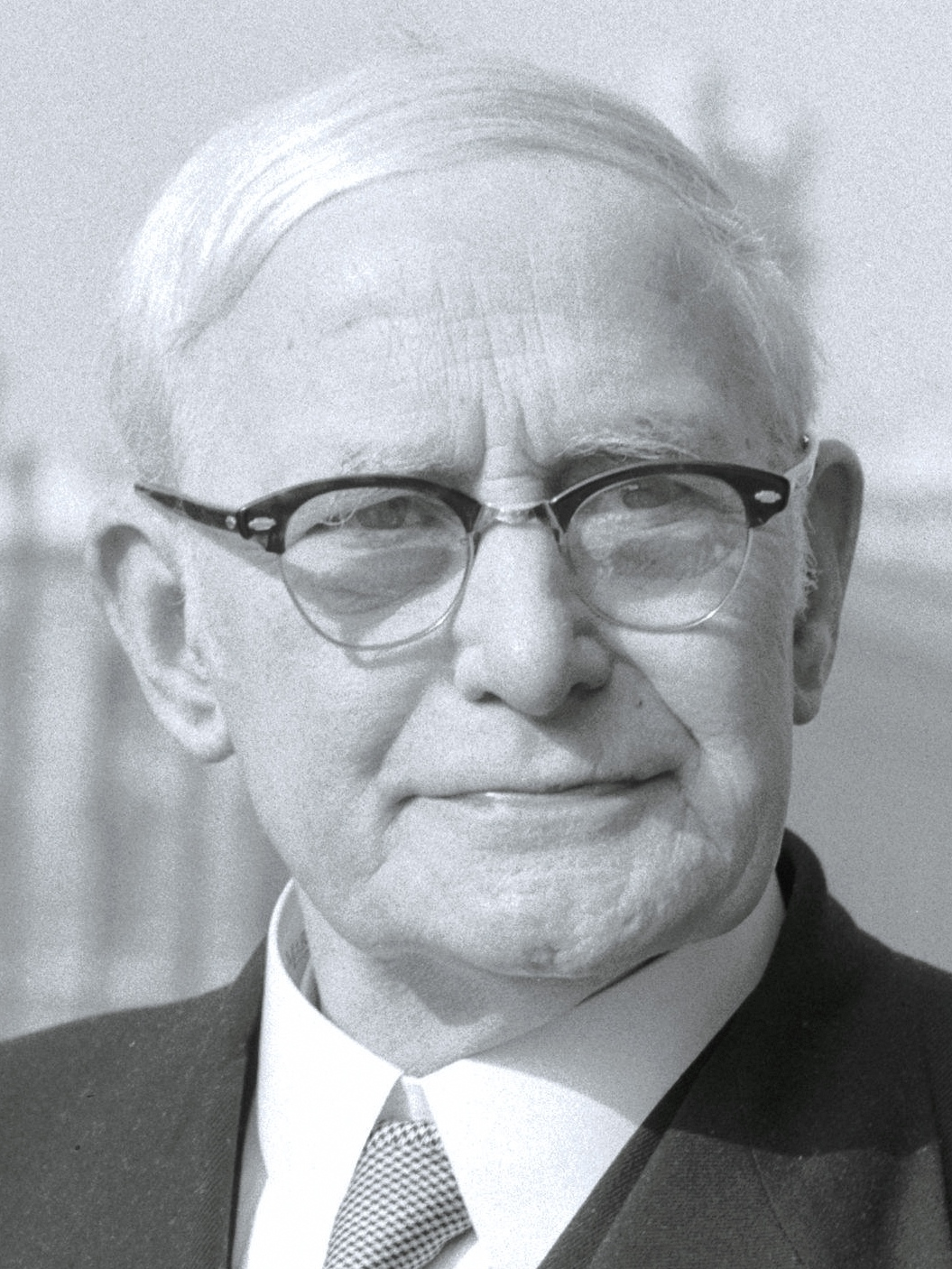

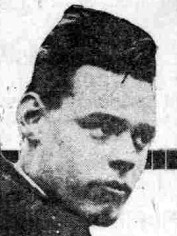
	First party	Second party
		Lib
Candidate	S. O. Davies	J. Victor Evans
Party	Labour	Liberal
Popular vote	18,645	10,376
Percentage	51.8%	28.9%
Swing	N/A	New
	Third party	Fourth party
	ILP
Candidate	Campbell Stephen	Wal Hannington
Party	Ind. Labour Party	Communist
Popular vote	3,508	3,409
Percentage	9.8	9.5%
Swing	▼59.6%	New
MP before election
R. C. Wallhead
Labour
Subsequent MP
S. O. Davies
Labour

The 1934 Merthyr by-election was a parliamentary by-election held on 5 June 1934 for the British House of Commons constituency of Merthyr in Wales.

The seat had become vacant when the Labour Member of Parliament (MP) Richard Wallhead had died on 27 April 1934, aged 64. He had won the seat at the 1922 general election as a Labour candidate. At the 1931 general election, he had been returned as an Independent Labour Party (ILP) candidate, but had rejoined the Labour Party in 1933.

The Labour candidate, S. O. Davies, held the seat for his party.

== Result ==
1934 Merthyr by-election
Party	Candidate	Votes	%	±%
Labour	S. O. Davies	18,645	51.8	N/A
Liberal	J. Victor Evans	10,376	28.9	N/A
Ind. Labour Party	Campbell Stephen	3,508	9.8	−59.6
Communist	Wal Hannington	3,409	9.5	N/A
Majority		8,269	22.9	N/A
Turnout		35,938	81.1	+0.3
Registered electors		44,286		
Labour gain from Ind. Labour Party		Swing	+55.7	

== See also ==
- Merthyr constituency
- Merthyr Tydfil
- Lists of United Kingdom by-elections
- United Kingdom by-election records
