= S. O. Davies =

British politician (died 1972)

S. O. Davies MP
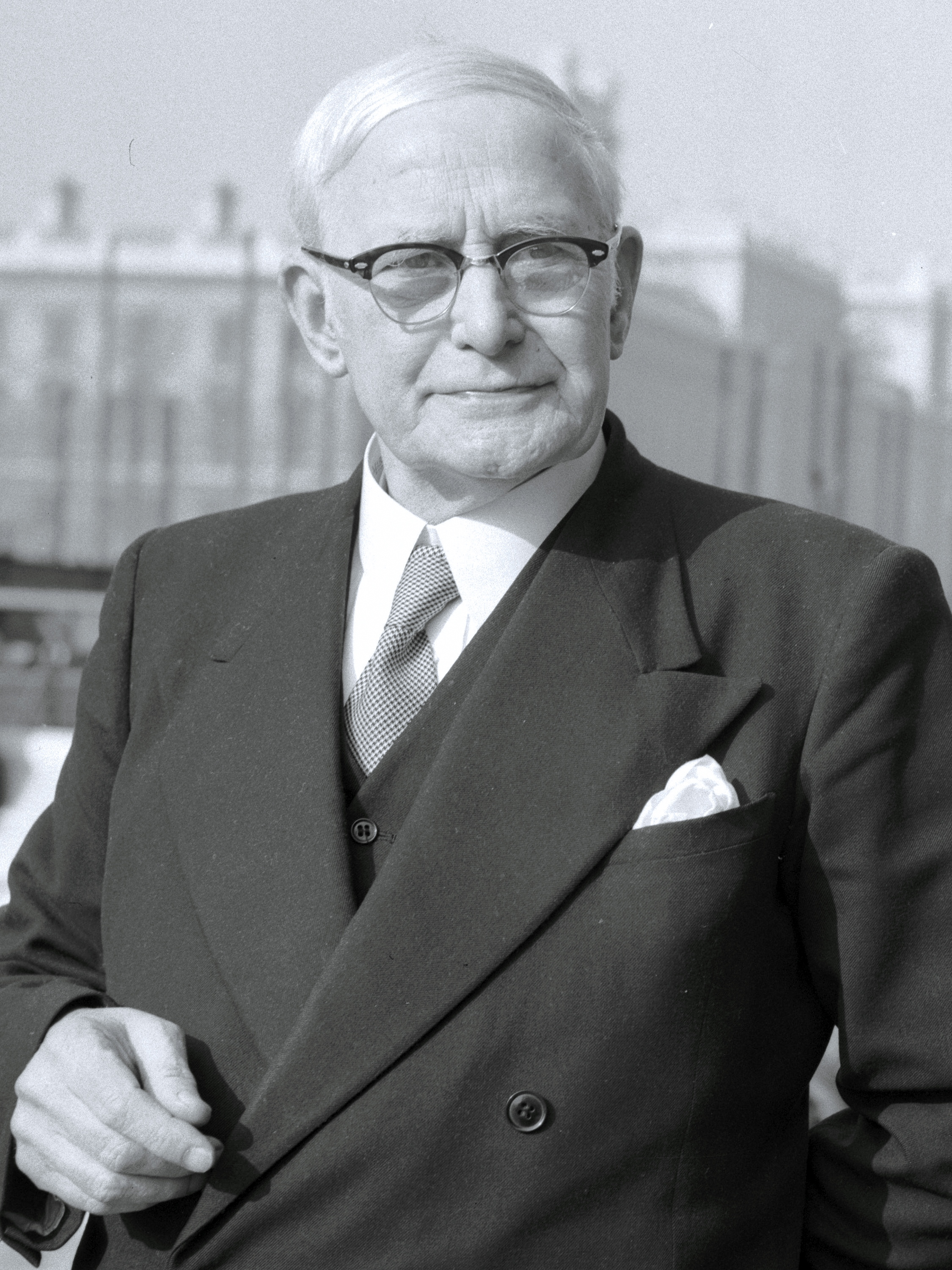
- Davies in 1955

Member of Parliament for Merthyr Tydfil (Merthyr 1934–1950)
- In office 5 June 1934 – 25 February 1972
- Preceded by: R. C. Wallhead
- Succeeded by: Ted Rowlands

Personal details
- Born: Date uncertain; November 1886 or earlier Abercwmboi, Glamorgan, Wales
- Died: 25 February 1972 Merthyr Tydfil, Glamorgan, Wales
- Party: Labour (Until 1970); Independent Labour (1970–1972)

Stephen Owen Davies (before 1889 – 25 February 1972), generally known as S. O. Davies, was a Welsh miner, trade union official and Labour Party politician, who served as the Member of Parliament (MP) for Merthyr Tydfil from 1950 to 1972, and previously Merthyr from 1934 to 1950. In 1970, when well past 80, he was deselected as parliamentary candidate by his local party association on account of his age. He fought the constituency in the 1970 general election as an Independent and won comfortably, a rare example in British politics of an independent candidate defeating a major party's organisation.

Most records show Davies's birth date as November 1886, but he is widely thought to have been born at least four years earlier. After leaving school aged 12 and working for some years in local pits, Davies studied mining engineering and later took an Arts degree at University College, Cardiff. He returned to the coalfields in 1913, and established a reputation for militancy. In 1918 he was elected miners' agent for the Dowlais district of the South Wales Miners' Federation (SWMF), and in 1924 was appointed SWMF's chief organiser, legal adviser, and vice-president. After a visit to Moscow in 1922 he became a firm advocate of the Soviet Union, a position he maintained for the rest of his life.

After his election to parliament in 1934, Davies was a consistent advocate for the interests of Merthyr Tydfil and mining in Wales. Largely indifferent to party discipline, he defied official Labour policy by championing such causes as disarmament and Welsh nationalism. His persistence in doing so brought him several suspensions from the party, and he was never offered ministerial office. An immensely popular figure locally, he was regularly returned at general elections with large majorities. In 1966, after the Aberfan disaster and loss of 144 lives, Davies controversially stated that he had long thought that the tip was unsafe. He had not reported his suspicions, for fear that an inquiry would cause the closures of local pits. Not long after his unexpected 1970 electoral triumph, Davies died early in 1972 aged at least 85 and possibly 90 or more.

== Early life ==
=== Birth, childhood and early career ===
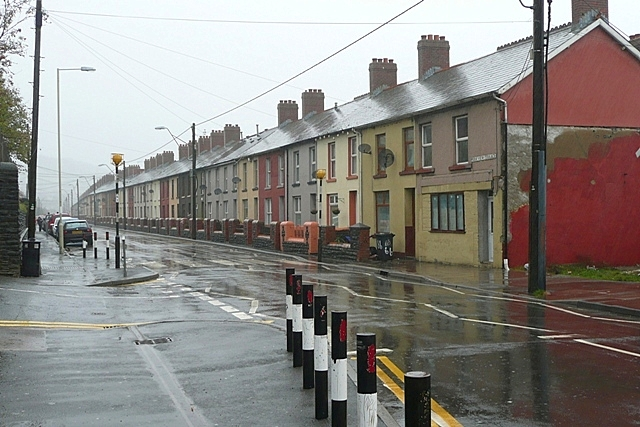
A street near Davies's birthplace in Abercwmboi

There is uncertainty about Davies's date of birth. Most sources say November 1886, though usually with the caveat that he might have been born several years earlier. (Note: In his biography of Davies, Robert Griffiths records that, when registering at University College, Cardiff in 1908, Davies gave his date of birth as 27 November 1883. His Dictionary of Welsh Biography entry states that "[a]ccording to the 1891 census, he was nine years of age at that time", which suggests 1881 or 1882 as his true birth year.) His birthplace was 39 John Street, Abercwmboi (then known as Cap Coch) in the South Wales coalfields, the fourth child of Thomas Davies and his wife Esther (née Owen). Thomas was a miner and trade union activist, who under the pseudonym Y Llwynog ("the Fox") wrote a column for the Welsh language newspaper Tarian y Gweithiwr ("The Worker's Shield"), in which he berated pit management and safety practices. His general militancy led to his blacklisting by pit owners, and after spells of unemployment he eventually found work as an insurance agent.

Davies attended the local Cap Coch school, leaving at the age of 12, as was usual at that time, (Note: The minimum school leaving age in the UK increased from 12 to 14 in 1918, to 15 in 1947 and 16 in 1972.) to begin work in the Cwmpennar coal mine. He remained there until the mine was exhausted in 1905, when he moved to Mountain Ash to work at Nixon's Navigation Colliery. His ambition and intelligence were quickly recognised by his superiors, and he was encouraged to study mining engineering, at first locally in Aberdare and, in 1907, at the Royal College of Science in London. In 1908, with sponsorship from the Brecon Memorial College, he passed his matriculation and began studying for a Bachelor of Arts (BA) degree at University College, Cardiff, with a view thereafter to entering the nonconformist ministry. However, Davies's religious beliefs were influenced by R. J. Campbell, a noted preacher who rejected much traditional Christian teaching and asserted that socialism was the practical expression of Christianity. (Note: In his 1907 treatise The New Theology, Campbell defined the "new theology" as "spiritual socialism".) Davies's association with such supposed heresies was unacceptable to the Brecon college, which withdrew its financial support.

Despite this loss of sponsorship, Davies completed his studies and graduated in 1913. His plans to enter the ministry were abandoned; he was an active member of the Independent Labour Party (ILP), and his religious vocation had been replaced by a commitment to working-class politics. In 1913, while still a student, he stood for election to Cardiff's Board of Guardians, as the ILP candidate in the Grangetown ward. This first foray into electoral politics ended in a narrow defeat, by 47 votes.

=== Mineworker and union official ===
After graduation, Davies returned to work in the mines, initially at Tumble in the Gwendraeth Valley. In December 1913, he unsuccessfully sought election as miners' sub-agent for the Anthracite Miners' district of the SWMF. When the First World War began in August 1914, he opposed it as capitalist militarism: "History teaches that war invariably brings in its wake a lower standard of morality, a restriction of the liberty of the masses, and a degradation of their social conditions". In 1917, Davies founded and was first chairman of the Burry Port and Gwendraeth Valley Trades and Labour Council. He was initially selected as the Labour candidate for the Llanelli constituency in the 1918 general election, but stood down when the SWMF backed his rival, J. H. Williams.

In 1918 Davies sought the position of miners' agent for the Dowlais district of the SWMF. Against strong competition—his main opponent was William Mainwaring, later a long-serving Labour MP for Rhondda East—Davies gained the seat by 100 votes. The main role of the agent was to represent miners in disputes with their employers; typically these would involve issues of pay, redundancy, working hours, and compensation for injuries. Davies's surviving day books reveal the extent to which he was concerned with cases where the mining companies denied liability for underground injuries.

In the summer of 1919 Davies married Elizabeth Margaret ("Madge") Eley in Cardiff; the couple had three daughters. The years following the First World War saw economic decline and hardship in the South Wales coalfields, conditions which deepened Davies's radical instincts, and he began to acquire a reputation for militancy. Contrary to mainstream Labour Party policy, Davies advocated workers' control rather than the nationalisation of the mining industry. In 1921, he unsuccessfully advocated affiliation of the Miners' Federation of Great Britain (MFGB, precursor of the National Union of Mineworkers or NUM) with the Red International of Labour Unions (RILU). The following year, he was a delegate from the SWMF to the Second World Congress of the RILU in Moscow, and acquired a warm sympathy towards the Soviet system. He did not, however, join the recently formed Communist Party of Great Britain, and remained within the Labour Party.

In 1924 Davies was appointed SWMF's chief organiser and legal adviser, and was elected its vice-president. He also served as the South Wales representative on the executive committee of the MFGB from 1924 to 1934. During the May 1926 general strike, the South Wales miners were among the most fervent in support of the action. When the national strike collapsed after nine days, Davies led the continued resistance from the Welsh coalfields through months of lockout, before capitulation on harsh terms in December. Dowlais was the last district to return to work. The period following 1926 saw much in-fighting between communist and non-communist factions in the coalfields. Davies and other non-communists found themselves accused of collaboration with "social fascism"; a leaflet issued by the communist-led National Minority Movement termed him "the sham militant". Nevertheless, he continued to work for cooperation between all factions on the left. After Hitler came to power in Germany in 1933, Davies argued for unity around the Labour Party, believing that the ILP's increasingly left-wing stance, and the Communist Party's commitment to violent revolution, might create the conditions for fascism. In 1931 Davies was elected to Merthyr Tydfil Borough Council.

== Member of Parliament ==
=== By-election June 1934 ===
When Richard Wallhead, the Labour MP for Merthyr, died on 27 April 1934, Davies was selected as the party's candidate for the June by-election, with the support of the MFGB. (Note: In April 1926, Davies had been chosen as the Labour candidate for the Flintshire constituency, in North Wales. The aftermath of the General Strike convinced him that he should remain in the South Wales coalfields.) Wallhead had held the seat since 1922, with large majorities; (Note: From 1898 until his death in 1915 the Labour pioneer Keir Hardie was one of Merthyr Tydfil's MPs (it was a two-member constituency until 1918)) in the 1931 general election he had defeated a single opponent, a candidate from Oswald Mosley's New Party who had received tacit support from the Conservative Party. Davies faced opposition from the Liberal Party, the Communist Party and the ILP. (Note: The ILP had been one of the founding elements of the Labour Party. From the late 1920s the ILP's confrontational approach clashed increasingly with the Labour Party's more cautious constitutionalism, leading to the former's disaffiliation from Labour in 1932.) With no candidate from the ruling National Government in the field, Davies was denied an obvious target for attack; as The Manchester Guardian stated in its pre-poll analysis, he was put on the defensive: "His is the dispiriting task of trying to lose as few votes as possible". The paper predicted a close result.

Using the slogan "Peace, Prosperity, Security, Freedom", Davies advocated the extension of public ownership, abolition of the means test, increased unemployment benefit, better education, and international co-operation especially with Russia. He dismissed the ILP as having no function beyond the splitting of the Labour vote. With strong support from the local trade unions and helped by a well-organised campaign, Davies swept to an easy victory on 5 June. His 18,645 votes gave him a majority of 8,269 over his Liberal opponent, with his ILP and Communist challengers lagging far behind.

=== In the House of Commons ===
==== Member for Merthyr ====
During the last ten years we have seen collieries close down, we have seen great iron and steel works which have figured so magnificently in the iron and steel industry close down, and no concrete assistance has been forthcoming from the Government ... No step whatsoever has been taken to try to modernise the technique of those ironworks and collieries, no effort has been made to establish other industries in those areas.

— S. O. Davies, House of Commons, 21 June 1934.

Davies gave his maiden speech in the House of Commons on 21 June 1934. Breaking with the tradition that such speeches should be non-partisan, he delivered a fierce attack on the government's policy towards the mining industry. He had come, he said, from a coalfield that "has had very little help from the present government ... we see communities with a great industrial history dissolving and disintegrating". An uncompromising approach on any questions affecting Merthyr Tydfil, or the mining industry generally, became Davies's parliamentary hallmark. In December 1934 he rebuked the veteran Conservative MP Nancy Astor when she referred to Merthyr as having "no social consciousness or initiative to do anything". Davies replied: "I object to irresponsible and brutal charges coming from people whose knowledge is derived from the enjoyment of vast wealth, especially when I am not certain that they have made their contribution towards producing that wealth".

In 1934, two years after his wife Margaret's death from cancer, Davies married Sephora Davies, a schoolteacher from Gwaun-Cae-Gurwen in Carmarthenshire who shared Davies's political outlook. The couple lived at Gwynfryn Park Terrace in Merthyr Tydfil, and had two sons. In November 1936, having been returned in the 1935 general election with an increased majority, Davies ridiculed the prime minister, Stanley Baldwin, for his refusal to meet a delegation from the National Unemployed Workers' Movement's 1936 Hunger March, which included a large contingent from South Wales: "A bigger man would meet these people who have tramped the roads of this country and would show that he had sympathy with them". In 1938, having modified his earlier position, Davies supported a bill introduced by the Labour opposition for the nationalisation of the coal industry. Miners worked, he said, in intolerable conditions to ensure that cheap raw material was available to industry. Reasonable wages and working conditions would never be granted by private coal-owners. The bill was defeated.

As Europe moved towards war in the late 1930s, Davies opposed the appeasement policies of the Chamberlain government. He doubted the will of the British ruling classes to wage a determined war against fascism, and called for a workers' "Popular Front" of resistance to the dictators. After the outbreak of war in September 1939 Davies demanded from the British government "a more specific and detailed statement" of war aims, to allay "suspicions ... as to the real and possibly as yet unstated war aims of this country and of France". He criticised Labour's decision in May 1940 to join Churchill's wartime coalition government, and thereafter opposed many of the coalition's domestic policies, such as indiscriminate internment of aliens, restrictions on industrial action, and the suppression of the communist newspaper the Daily Worker. The bitterness of Davies's personal attack on Herbert Morrison, the Home Secretary who had authorised the paper's closure, shocked even the British Communist Party's general secretary, Harry Pollitt, who cautioned Davies that "personal abuse has been our stock-in-trade for twenty years and has got us nowhere".

Unlike the British communists, Davies did not change his position when the Soviet Union entered the war in June 1941. He continued to oppose all co-operation with the Conservatives, believing that only through socialism could a just and lasting peace be achieved. Victory in 1945, and the subsequent election of a Labour government, did little to affect Davies's individualism. In the Labour years 1945–51, he opposed government policies on conscription, NATO, the development of nuclear weapons, and intervention in the Korean War. According to his biographer Robert Griffiths, it was hatred of capitalist militarism, rather than a wish to support the Soviet Union, that underlay Davies's stances. His popularity in South Wales was unaffected: he was returned to parliament in each postwar election with large majorities. (Note: In the 1945 general election Davies's majority rose to 19,186; it increased to 22,916 in 1950 and fell back slightly, to 21,436 in 1951.) In 1945–46 he served as Merthyr Tydfil's mayor, remaining on the local council until 1949.

==== Labour rebel ====
In assessing Davies's political career the historian Alun Morgan notes certain inconsistencies: while calling for unity among leftist factions, Davies frequently rebelled against agreed Labour Party policies. He championed democracy, individual liberty and the rights of small nations, yet gave the Soviet Union his unvarying and uncritical support. However, he was consistent in certain core areas, often in defiance of official Labour policy: unremitting hostility to US foreign policy, opposition to the party's post-war defence policies (specifically on issues concerning American bases in Britain, rearmament in West Germany, and development of the Polaris submarine programme), and above all commitment to the needs and interests of his Merthyr constituents. His dedication to his own agenda brought him into frequent conflict with party managers, and led to withdrawals of the party whip throughout the 1950s and 1960s. Stating his position in a 1948 letter to the Labour Party general secretary Morgan Phillips, he wrote: "Our movement embraces millions of men and women, and not merely a few hundred MPs and a few dozen ... members of the National Executive. I am habitually inclined to give our millions my first thoughts and consideration." Davies's popularity with the voters of Merthyr Tydfil remained constant; he secured 75 per cent or more of the vote in each of the general elections of 1955, 1959, 1964 and 1966. (Note: Davies's general election majorities were; 1955, 18,082; 1959, 18,723; 1964, 18,508; 1966, 17,655.)

In December 1951 Sephora Davies was expelled from the Labour Party because of her close association with a proscribed organisation, the British-Soviet Friendship Society. Davies's deep roots in the Labour movement, and his large base of local support, saved him from a similar fate. In June 1953 he was attacked by Will Lawther, the NUM president, for defying the Labour Party's position and supporting the Soviet claim that a workers' rising in East Germany had been orchestrated by "a CIA-sponsored West-German pro-fascist organisation". Lawther demanded that the local Merthyr Tydfil party deselect Davies as their parliamentary candidate, but they stood firm.

We [the Welsh] have no quarrel with any people or nation in this world ... We can feel no enmity against any other people or nation, whatever their colour, creed or religion ... The heart of our hospitable country goes out to those who are struggling against tyranny and against obstruction, because we know that obstruction has been placed in the way of this little country to which I am proud to belong.

— S. O. Davies, House of Commons, 22 January 1953.

Davies found himself again at odds with his party, over the issue of Welsh self-government. He had championed this cause for many years, to the annoyance of Labour's Welsh Regional Council. In May 1954 he offered proposals for a Welsh parliament that were rejected by the Regional Council and by the South Wales Area conference of the NUM. Davies persevered, and on 4 March 1955 introduced in the House of Commons a private member's bill proposing self-government for Wales on the basis of the aborted 1914 act that would have granted home rule to Ireland. Davies claimed to have received thousands of messages of support for his measure, from all parts of Wales, but in the House he could only muster 14 votes in favour. Undeterred, he told MPs: "There is a movement in Wales, an uprising, as it were, that will not only support the bill but will continue to insist upon it until Wales is represented in the United Kingdom as something more than a mere region."

According to Griffiths, when Soviet troops suppressed the Hungarian uprising in October 1956, Davies was troubled, but refused to join in the general censure lest this give comfort to the enemies of socialism. He was to be equally silent during and after the events of the Prague Spring of 1968—in sharp contrast to his condemnation of the "criminally dangerous and irresponsible heroics" of the United States during the Cuban Missile Crisis of October 1962. In 1961, at the request of the Labour Party leadership, Davies was one of 25 Labour MPs and party members investigated by the British security services as a possible Communist Party member. The MI5 report stated that there was evidence to indicate that Davies, "if not of the Party ... is at least very close to it indeed".

== Aberfan ==
Davies's Merthyr constituency included the mining village of Aberfan, situated a few miles south of Merthyr Tydfil. On the mountainsides above the village, colliery waste had been dumped over the years to form large spoil tips. Shortly after 9:00 am on Friday 21 October 1966 one of these tips collapsed, sending thousands of tons of semi-liquid waste hurtling towards Aberfan. The point of impact was Pantglas Junior School, where morning lessons were beginning. The school was half buried; inside, 109 children and 5 teachers were killed. A further 7 children and 23 adults lost their lives outside the school, in the streets or adjoining houses. In the immediate aftermath, Davies visited and consoled the bereaved families in Aberfan, and the following day he led a party which included the Duke of Edinburgh on a tour of the disaster site.

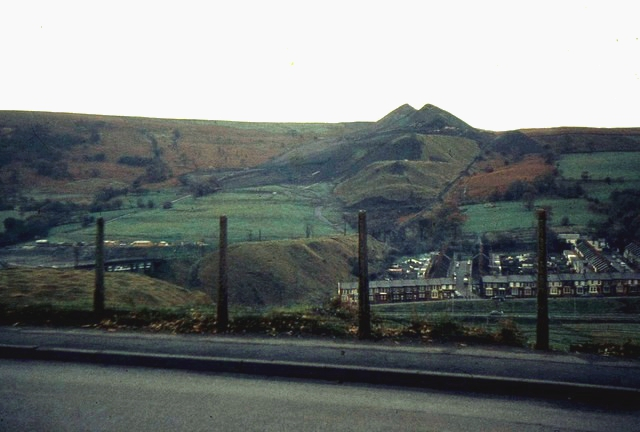
The spoil tips above Aberfan, photographed two years after the disaster

On 24 October the National Coal Board (Note: The UK coal industry had been removed from private ownership and nationalised in 1946, with control vested in an appointed National Coal Board.) chairman Lord Robens stated that the cause of the landslip was a previously unknown spring, which had been pouring water into the centre of the tip, creating a "water bomb". Local miners disagreed; they said that the spring's existence had been known when tipping began 20 years earlier. A tribunal was set up under Lord Justice Edmund Davies, to investigate the disaster.

Giving evidence to the tribunal, Davies said he had long suspected that the Aberfan tips were unstable, but had kept quiet for fear that if tipping was stopped on the mountainside the Coal Board would close the colliery. Davies added: "But if I had been asked to do so, I would have done it". His testimony was strongly challenged by the NUM, whose counsel Brian Gibbens QC said that "[i]f Mr Davies is to be accepted as truthful and accurate in his recollection ... then he bears what must be one of the largest personal burdens of responsibility for the disaster". However, Gibbens found it incredible that a man in Davies's unique local position of authority and influence would not have mentioned his fears to any of the formal bodies—borough council, Coal Board, union or local Labour Party: "If anyone could have exercised influence to overcome an obdurate or ignorant monolith like the Coal Board, [Davies] was well placed to do so." Gibbens submitted that Davies's testimony should be rejected, on the grounds that he "never appreciated what in fact was the import of his words". The tribunal concurred, accepting that Davies had not fully understood the gravity of his admission, and adding that had they been convinced otherwise, he could not have escaped censure. The tribunal's findings, published in July 1967, placed responsibility for the disaster firmly on the National Coal Board, specifically on the absence of any tipping policy. (Note: A later study of the disaster found it remarkable that "nobody [at the Board] was prosecuted, dismissed, or demoted, and that Lord Robens's offer to resign as chairman ... was rejected".)

== Later career ==
=== Rift with Labour ===
In December 1966 Davies introduced a bill to the House of Commons, to provide more generous compensation to miners suffering from dust-related diseases. The bill was accepted by Harold Wilson's Labour government, and became law in 1967. This was one of the few instances during this period in which Davies and the Labour government worked together. Following the Coal Board's refusal to meet the full cost of removing the remaining Aberfan tips, Wilson proposed that part of the required £750,000 be met by the disaster fund set up to help the people of Aberfan rebuild their community. Davies was outraged; he told Wilson: "I have never known a prime minister to behave so disgracefully in all my 34 years in the House of Commons". (Note: Ultimately the disaster fund agreed to pay £150,000, a decision that prompted Davies to resign from the fund's committee. In June 1997 the incoming Labour government under Tony Blair repaid the amount to the still-extant disaster fund.) Subsequently, Davies opposed the 1969 decision of Merthyr Tydfil Council to award Wilson the freedom of the borough, stating that he would boycott the ceremony.

While many constituents supported Davies in his frequent attacks on government policies, the local Labour Party became increasingly concerned by his activities. By the late 1960s many of them were from a younger generation, with no experience of the shared hardships of the 1920s and 1930s, and with a less parochial mindset. They were angered by what they perceived as Davies's disloyalty to the Wilson government, elected in 1964 after thirteen years of opposition, and his penchant for following his own agenda. There was also the question of his age; in 1970 he was supposedly 83, but rumours that he was older were widespread. By March 1970 the local party discussed replacing Davies as their candidate at the next general election, citing his age rather than policy disagreements. The National Executive of the party sanctioned this action, and at a special meeting on 10 May, which Davies declined to attend, he was formally deselected.

=== 1970 election ===
I am still the member of Parliament. Let the people of Merthyr decide whether they want S. O. or not. I have been the member for 36 years and I've always made Merthyr my absolute priority. Party interests have been secondary[.]

— Davies following his deselection, May 1970.

Davies reacted to his deselection by announcing that the people of Merthyr, not the local Labour Party, would decide his future. If physically fit he would contest the next election as an independent Socialist. Friends advised him not to risk humiliation; no deselected candidate in recent times had won election against the party machine, and Davies would, they predicted, get no more than 1,000 votes. Within a few days of the deselection meeting Wilson called a snap general election, which gave the Merthyr party little time to find their new candidate. They chose Tal Lloyd, an Amalgamated Engineering Union (AEU) official, a long-serving councillor and a former mayor, on the moderate wing of the Labour Party, and a strong supporter of Wilson.

With no party organisation and only his own financial resources, Davies's campaign was initially very low-key. His election literature was a single sheet with the message "You Know Me, I've Never Let You Down". As polling day approached, however, it was clear that he was gathering support, particularly among the young—a great irony, Alun Morgan observes, for a man sacked on the grounds of his age. In the final week before polling day on 18 June Davies's youthful supporters toured the constituency with songs, slogans and cheerleaders in what Griffiths describes as "the most colourful election bandwaggon seen in Merthyr for 40 years". The official Labour campaign stalled, as Lloyd became embroiled in a row over his role in the failure of the AEU to support an unofficial strike at the local Hoover factory. On polling day, amid scenes of jubilation, Davies was returned with a majority of 7,467 over Lloyd. Davies responded to his victory by thanking the voters whom he said he had never thought would let him down. Two weeks later Davies and his principal campaign workers were expelled from the Labour Party for opposing its official candidate. The national leadership refused his request for an official inquiry into the actions of the Merthyr party, in the selection process and during the election itself.

=== Final years and death ===
Despite his expulsion, in July 1970 the Labour-controlled Merthyr council offered Davies the freedom of the borough, an honour which he politely declined; the confidence of the people recently shown him was, he said, enough. He resumed his place in parliament, on the opposition benches as Labour had unexpectedly lost the election to Edward Heath's Conservatives. Despite some ill-feeling, Davies was not ostracised by his erstwhile colleagues, and was unofficially briefed by the party. He limited his Commons appearances and rarely spoke in debates, generally preferring to serve his constituents from home. On the major national issue of the 1970–74 parliament—Heath's renewed bid for Britain's membership of the European Economic Community (EEC)—Davies voiced uncompromising opposition. In a letter to the South Wales Echo on 9 August 1971, he challenged the government's claim that "our security has been bound up with our European neighbours for over a thousand years", pointing out Britain's involvement in numerous European wars, "including the Hitler war when British security meant co-operation with Russia".

On 22 February 1972, Davies attended parliament to vote against the government on an EEC-related motion. He returned to Merthyr suffering from a chest infection, took to his bed on 24 February, and the following day was transferred to Merthyr General Hospital where he died later that day. His funeral was held at Soar-Ynysgau chapel, Merthyr on 29 February, followed by burial at the Maes-Yr-Arian Cemetery at nearby Mountain Ash. Griffiths records: "It was indicative of [Davies's] breadth of vision that the ceremony attracted socialists, communists, Welsh nationalists, republicans, and many of no political creed at all". In the April by-election to fill the vacancy caused by Davies's death the Labour candidate, Ted Rowlands, won the seat with a narrow majority over Plaid Cymru.

== Tributes ==
According to a BBC correspondent, Davies "looked as if he belonged to a different age, in his parliamentary 'uniform' of homburg hat, silk scarf, black jacket and pin-striped trousers". Two close Merthyr friends who had followed him out of the Labour Party described him as "[a] tall man who walked tall and never bowed to anyone, but treated everyone alike." His obituarist in The Times referred to his deceptively mild outward demeanour, "but underneath, fires were forever smouldering".

Many of the tributes paid to Davies after his death acknowledged his commitment to Merthyr and the mining communities of the Welsh valleys, for which he was an unfailing advocate. The mayor of Merthyr remarked that he was "an individualist who followed the teaching of 'Love thy neighbour as thyself'. He was highly respected by all, even by those who didn't agree with him". His parliamentary colleague and fellow mineworker Jim Griffiths, who had shared with Davies the leadership of the South Wales miners after the 1926 general strike, thought that had Davies cultivated an ability for compromise, he would have achieved ministerial office. But "he always was a lone figure ... and seemed to like being in isolation."

In April 2013 a heritage plaque in Davies's honour was unveiled at Penydarren Park, Merthyr Tydfil. On 5 August 2015, as part of the De Montfort Project celebrating the 750th anniversary of Simon de Montfort's parliament, Davies's parliamentary work was recognised in special events at Cardiff and Merthyr Tydfil.

The Revd Islwyn Jones, who conducted Davies's funeral service, said: "He had a great love for man, he believed with the Psalmist that 'The earth is the Lord's and the fulness thereof', and it was these words, sinking deep into his heart, which made him 'take up the cudgels for the common man'".

== Notes and references ==
=== Sources ===
==== Books, journals, newspapers ====
- "A Candidate from Tumble". Amman Valley Chronicle. 4 December 1913. p. 6.
- Berger, Stefan; LaPorte, Norman (2010). Friendly Enemies: Britain and the GDR, 1949–1990. New York: Berghahn Books. ISBN 978-1-84545-697-9.
- Campbell, R.J. (1907). The New Theology. New York: Macmillan. OCLC 3975604.
- Cohen, Gidon (2007). The Failure of a Dream. London: Tauris Academic Studies. ISBN 978-1-84511-300-1.
- Davies, Edmund (1967). Report of the Tribunal appointed to inquire into the Disaster at Aberfan on October 21st 1966 HL 316, HC 553. London: HMSO. OCLC 209323.
- Frost, Denis (24 October 1966). "Coal Board Blames Hidden Spring for Aberfan Landslip". The Guardian. p. 1. ProQuest 185221886. (subscription required)
- Frost, Denis (26 October 1966). "Sir Edmund Davies promises 'no whitewash' at Aberfan inquiry". The Guardian. p. 3. ProQuest 185252015. (subscription required)
- Griffiths, Robert (1983). S. O. Davies: A Socialist Faith. Llandysul, Dyfed: Gomer Press. ISBN 978-0-85088-887-4.
- Griffiths, Robert (2012). Our History: S. O. Davies, "Fellow-travelling" and the Cold War. London: Communist Party of Britain. ISBN 978-1-908315-20-5.
- "Heritage Plaques Unveiled in Merthyr Tydfil to Town Heroes S. O. Davies and Moss Evans". Daily Post (North Wales). 4 April 2013.
- Jones, J. Graham (December 1992). "The Parliament for Wales campaign, 1950-1956" (PDF). Welsh History Review. 16 (2): 207–36.
- "Merthyr Mourns its Loss". Merthyr Express. 3 March 1972. p. 1.
- "Merthyr Polling Today". The Manchester Guardian. 5 June 1934. p. 8. ProQuest 483661390. (subscription required)
- "Merthyr Shocks Labour". The Guardian. 15 April 1972. p. 5. ProQuest 185583702. (subscription required)
- Mitchell, B.R.; Boehm, Klaus (1966). British Parliamentary Election Results 1950–1964. Cambridge: Cambridge University Press.
- Perrott, Roy (21 July 1968). "Aberfan Angered by Tips Verdict". The Guardian. p. 3. ProQuest 475868661. (subscription required)

==== Hansard (Parliamentary debates) ====
- "Clause 4.—(Supplementary provisions as to smallholdings and allotments.)". Hansard. 296. 13 December 1934.
- "Ministry of Labour". Hansard. 291. 21 June 1934.
- "Unemployed Marchers Petition". Hansard. 317. 11 November 1936.
- "Nationalisation of Mines and Minerals Bill". Hansard. 331. 4 February 1938.
- "The War". Hansard. 352. 12 October 1939.
- "Welsh Affairs". Hansard. 510. 22 January 1953.
- "Government of Wales Bill". Hansard. 537. 4 March 1955.
- "National Insurance Acts 1946 and 1948 (Amendment) Bill". Hansard. 743. 17 March 1967.
- "European Communities". Hansard. 831. 22 February 1972.

==== Online ====
- Bolton, Paul (27 November 2012). "Education: Historical Statistics" (PDF). House of Commons Library.
- Byers, Michael (2002). "ILP: Independent Labour Party". Glasgow Digital Library.
- "Coal Industry Nationalisation Act 1946". legislation.gov.uk. The National Archives.
- Davies, Keith (2004). "Davies, Stephen Owen". Oxford Dictionary of National Biography (online ed.). Oxford University Press. doi:10.1093/ref:odnb/47339. (Subscription, Wikipedia Library access or UK public library membership required.) (subscription required)
- "Davies, Stephen Owen". Who's Who 2016 and Who was Who online edition. 2016. (subscription required)
- "Glamorgan Archives Host Talk on Merthyr MP S .O. Davies". Wales Online. 30 July 2015.
- "Heath's surprise victory". BBC News. 5 April 2005.
- Jones, John Graham (1 August 2008). "Davies, Stephen Owen (1886?-1972), miners' leader and Labour politician". Dictionary of Welsh Biography. National Library of Wales.
- "Living Heritage: Career as a miners' agent". www.parliament.uk. UK Parliament.
- "Living Heritage: Early attempts at election to Parliament". www.parliament.uk. UK Parliament.
- "Living Heritage: Early life in mining communities". www.parliament.uk. UK Parliament.
- "Living Heritage: Election and Parliamentary career". www.parliament.uk. UK Parliament.
- "Living Heritage: Entry into politics". www.parliament.uk. UK Parliament.
- McNeill, Iain (project director) (1999). "Corporatism and Regulatory Failure: Government Response to the Aberfan Disaster". Nuffield College, Oxford.
- Morgan, Alun (1978). "The 1970 Parliamentary Election at Merthyr Tydfil". Welsh Journals Online. National Library of Wales. pp. 61–81.
- Morgan, Kenneth O. (2011). "Hardie, (James) Keir". Oxford Dictionary of National Biography (online ed.). Oxford University Press. doi:10.1093/ref:odnb/33696. (Subscription, Wikipedia Library access or UK public library membership required.) (subscription required)
- Priddy, Sarah (27 January 2016). "Maiden Speeches in the House of Commons since 1918". House of Commons Library.
- "Rebel history lesson for new MP". BBC News. 9 May 2005.
- "Report of the Tribunal appointed to inquire into the Disaster at Aberfan on October 21st 1966". Durham Miners' Museum. 17 July 1967.
- "Swansea University: S. O. Davies". Archives Wales. Archived from the original on 23 May 2012.
- "Wallhead, Richard Collingham". Who's Who 2016 and Who was Who Online edition. 2016. (subscription required)

Parliament of the United Kingdom
Preceded by Richard Collingham Wallhead	Member of Parliament for Merthyr; 1934–1950	Constituency abolished
New constituency	Member of Parliament for Merthyr Tydfil; 1950–1972	Succeeded by Ted Rowlands
Trade union offices
Preceded by John Davies	Agent for the Dowlais District of the South Wales Miners' Federation; 1918–1933	Succeeded by Noah Ablett; Owen Powell
Preceded by Enoch Morrell	Vice-President of the South Wales Miners' Federation; 1924–1933	Succeeded by Arthur Jenkins
Preceded by Joseph Jones	Vice-President of the Miners' Federation of Great Britain; 1933–1934	Succeeded by Will Lawther
