= William Pritchard-Morgan =

William Pritchard-Morgan

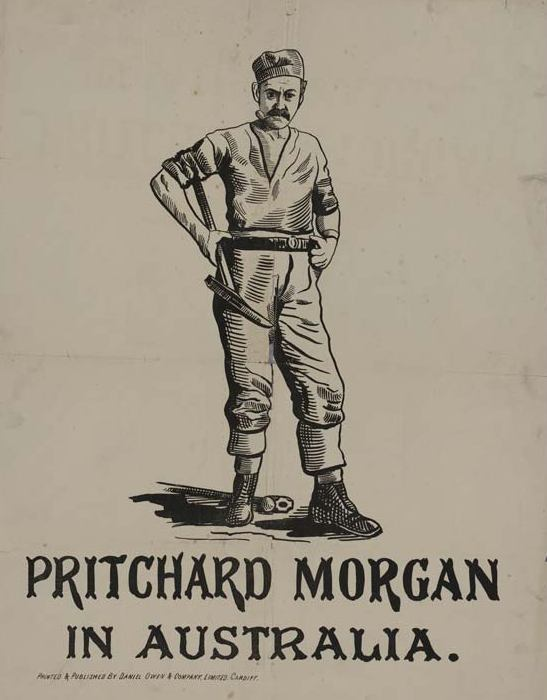
A cartoon image of Morgan mining in Australia

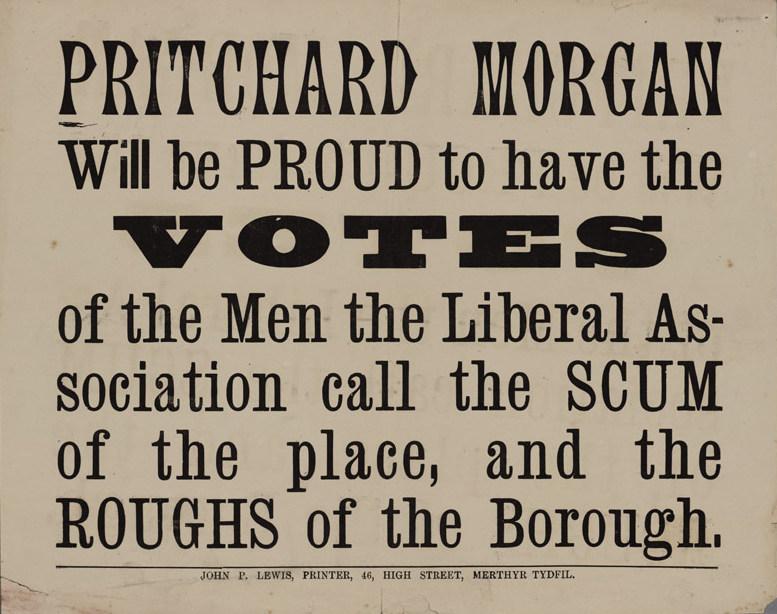
One of Morgan's election posters

William Pritchard-Morgan (c. 1844 – 5 July 1924) was a Welsh solicitor, mine owner, and company promoter. He acquired the gold mine at Gwynfynydd in 1887, earning the name "Welsh gold king". He was also actively publicised as an investor in Sichuan, China.

He was born in Newport, Monmouthshire, the son of a clergyman. In early life he was a solicitor in Queensland, Australia, having been articled at Ipswich and Maryborough. He then speculated in mining shares.

He was a Liberal Member of Parliament (MP) for Merthyr Tydfil, from 1888 to 1900, when he was defeated, losing his seat to Keir Hardie. The constituency had two members, the other being the Liberal David Alfred Thomas, 1st Viscount Rhondda: there was antagonism between the two Liberals, however, and in 1900 Thomas backed Hardie. A major political issue between them was attitude to the Second Boer War, supported by Morgan who was on the Liberal imperialist wing of the party. He was in favour of Welsh disestablishment, making a lengthy parliamentary speech on a resolution in 1891.

Parliament of the United Kingdom
Preceded by D. A. Thomas; Henry Richard	Member of Parliament for Merthyr Tydfil; 1888–1900; With: D. A. Thomas	Succeeded by D. A. Thomas; Keir Hardie
