= Merthyr Tydfil (UK Parliament constituency) =

UK Parliament constituency (1832–1918, 1950–1983)

- Former borough constituency for the House of Commons

1832–1918
- Created from: Glamorgan
- Replaced by: Merthyr; Aberdare

1950–1983
- Created from: Merthyr
- Replaced by: Merthyr Tydfil and Rhymney

Merthyr Tydfil was a parliamentary constituency centred on the town of Merthyr Tydfil in Glamorgan. From 1832 to 1868 it returned one Member of Parliament (MP) to the House of Commons of the Parliament of the United Kingdom, and in 1868 this was increased to two members. The two-member constituency was abolished for the 1918 general election.

A single-member constituency (known as Merthyr) existed from 1918 until 1945 and, by the 1950 general election, it had been renamed Merthyr Tydfil. The constituency was abolished for the 1983 general election, when it was largely replaced by the new Merthyr Tydfil and Rhymney constituency.

== History ==
Merthyr was regarded as a Liberal seat throughout the nineteenth century and particularly after the landmark election of 1868. There were tensions within the constituency, however and these were manifested by the rivalry between Merthyr and Aberdare, which became more pronounced as the latter grew in importance after 1850. Increasingly, also, the constituency was affected by the debate about working-class representation. Thomas Halliday contested Merthyr as a 'labour' candidate as early as 1874 and the return of Keir Hardie in 1900 was a notable landmark in the growth of the Labour Party. From 1922 onwards, Merthyr was a safe Labour seat.

== 1832–1867 ==
The Reform Act 1832 was the first significant review of the arrangements for the election of MPs to the House of Commons, Patterns of representation had remained essentially unchanged for centuries and no recognition was given to the growth of urban settlements in the wake of the industrial revolution. The discontent of the late 1820s, culminating in serious disturbances in 1831, including the Merthyr Rising persuaded the government to take action in favour of reform. Within the Reform Act 1832 the one significant change in Wales was the carving out of a new parliamentary constituency, centred at Merthyr Tydfil, from the county of Glamorgan.

The Parliamentary Boundaries Act 1832 defined the new Parliamentary Borough of Merthyr Tydvil in great detail:

From the Point on the North of Merthyr Tydvil at which the Northern Boundary of the Hamlet of Gellydeg meets the River called the Great Taff, Northward, along the Great Taff, to the Point at which the same is cut by the Southern Fence of Cilsanos Common; thence, Eastward, along the Fence of Cilsanos Common to the Point at which the same cuts the Brecon Road; thence, Southward, along the Brecon Road to the Point at which the same meets the Vainor Road; thence, Eastward, along the Vainor Road to the Point at which the same meets a Bye Road leading to Cefn-coed-y-Cwymner; thence in a straight Line to the Point at which the Little Taff would be cut by a straight Line to be drawn from the Point last described to the Southern Mouth of a Culvert on the Eastern Side of the Little Taff; thence, up the Little Taff, along the Boundary of the Parish of Merthyr Tydvil to the Point at which the Cwm Bargoed Stream is joined by a little Brook from the Coli Ravine; thence in a straight Line to the North eastern Corner of the Stone Fence of Pen-dwy-cae Vawr Farm; thence along the Road which passes Pen-dwy-cae Vawr Farmhouse to the Point at which the same meets the Mountain Track from Dowlais to Quakers Yard; thence, Southward, along the said Track, between the Farms of Pen-dwy-cae Vach and Pen-dwy-cae Vawr, to the Point at which such Track meets a Road running nearly due West, by a Stone Quarry, to Pen-y-rhw Gymra Cottage; thence along the last-mentioned Road to the Point at which the same reaches the Southern Side of Pen-y-rhw Gymra Cottage; thence in a straight Line to the Point at which the Southern Boundary of Troed-y-rhw Farm meets the Cardiff Road; thence along the Southern Boundary of Troed-y-rhw Farm to the Point at which the same meets the Great Taff; thence in a straight Line to the Bridge over the Cardiff Canal called Pont-y-nant Maen; thence, Northward, along the Cardiff Canal to the Point at which the same is intersected by the Cwmdu Brook; thence along the Cwmdu Brook to its Source; thence in a straight Line drawn due West to the Boundary of the Parish of Aberdare; thence, Southward, along the Boundary of the Parish of Aberdare to the Point at which the same meets the Boundary of the Hamlet of Gellydeg; thence, Eastward, along the Boundary of the Hamlet of Gellydeg to the Point first described.

=== Electoral politics 1832–1867 ===
When the constituency was established the vast majority of the electorate were resident in Merthyr Tydfil and its environs, such as the industrial township of Dowlais. In contrast the electorate of the neighbouring Aberdare Valley was relatively small, numbering 3,691 compared with 22,083 in Merthyr. The first member for Merthyr Tydfil was Sir Josiah John Guest who served, albeit with some opposition until his death in 1852.

Guest was succeeded by Henry Austin Bruce who, again, served with little opposition until the Reform Act 1867. Bruce was a prominent Liberal although associated with the less radical wing of the Liberal Party and was criticised for his role in events such as the 1857 Aberdare Strike.

== 1867–1918 ==
The Representation of the People Act 1867, which increased the number of members returned to two, also widened the constituency boundaries. To the existing parliamentary borough were added some additional parts of the parish of Aberdare, part of the parishes of Merthyr and "Faenor" (Vaynor), and part of the district of Mountain Ash.

The same boundaries were retained in 1885, and can be seen on the boundary commissioners' map.

=== 1868 general election ===
Merthyr Tydfil saw one of the most remarkable contests of the 1868 general election. Resulting directly from a tenfold increase in the electorate. Henry Richard was returned at the expense of the sitting member, Henry Austin Bruce.

Bruce had served as member since 1832 and his position was secure until the reforms of 1867. Even thereafter, the immediate interest appeared to be in who would occupy the second seat rather than whether or nor Bruce would be re-elected. The Merthyr element of the constituency had dominated the representation since its formation in 1832 but in recent years the population of the neighbouring Aberdare valley had grown considerably, mainly as a result of the development of the steam coal trade, that they should determine the identity of the second member. The Merthyr electorate had traditionally been far larger than that of Aberdare but by 1868, Aberdare's electorate formed almost half the total (11,446 in Aberdare; 13,329 in Merthyr). As a result, there was a widespread view amongst the industrialists and tradesmen of the Aberdare Valley that they should have a say in the selection of a second Liberal candidate to contest the seat alongside Bruce.

These commercial interests of the Aberdare Valley soon became allied with the powerful nonconformist interest, which was led by the key figure of Thomas Price, minister of Calfaria, Aberdare. Price, and other nonconformist ministers, were considered to have considerable influence over the largely chapel-going industrial workers who had been newly enfranchised. During 1867 these groupings rallied around Richard Fothergill, owner of the Aberdare Ironworks and also a figure of some influence in Merthyr due to his ownership of the Plymouth Ironworks. It was confidently expected that Fothergill would be returned alongside Bruce.

This remained the position until Henry Richard entered the fray in the summer of 1868. Richard's candidature was also opposed by members of the Irish community, on account of alleged comments by Richard about the Pope during a speech at Brecon.

=== 1868–1888 ===
Richard and Fothergill were re-elected in 1874. By 1879, however, Fothergill was in financial difficulties and there were calls for him to step aside. A deputation of tradesmen and working men who attended a meeting at Swansea to request to offer himself once again as a candidate but he eventually declined. He was replaced by Charles Herbert James. member of a long-standing politically active family in Merthyr. Both served until 1888 when Richard died and James stood down, leading to two by-elections within a twelve-month period. These led to the return of David Alfred Thomas and William Pritchard Morgan. Thomas and Morgan had much in common. Both were nonconformists, both were wealthy industrialists and both placed Welsh issues high on their list of political priorities. However, they also shared 'a hearty loathing' for each other.

Morgan's return, in particular, was significant, as he defeated Foulkes Griffiths, the official candidate of the Liberal Association. The result was also regarded as a defeat for the Cymru Fydd element in the Welsh Liberal Party. The Merthyr Liberal Association broke up after this election and did not function again until 1909.

=== 1888–1918 ===
David Thomas

Relations between Thomas and Morgan were not good, leading ultimately to a Liberal split which contributed to the success of Keir Hardie at the 1900 general election. For the first decade of the twentieth century Merthyr was represented by the unusual combination of David Alfred Thomas and Hardie. In 1910, Thomas chose to contest Cardiff instead and was succeeded by Sir Edgar Jones.

== 1918–1950 ==
The two-member Merthyr Boroughs constituency was replaced at the 1918 general election by two separate constituencies, Aberdare and Merthyr Tydfil.

== 1950–1983 ==
Merthyr Tydfil Borough Constituency, created by the Representation of the People Act 1948, had an identical area to the County Borough of Merthyr Tydfil. The seat was first contested at the 1950 general election. The boundaries were unchanged until 1983.

== Members of Parliament ==
=== MPs 1832–1868 ===
Election	Member	Party
1832	Sir John Josiah Guest	Whig
1852	Henry Bruce	Peelite
1859	Henry Bruce	Liberal
1868	representation increased to two members	

=== MPs 1868–1918 ===
Election	1st Member	1st Party	2nd Member	2nd Party
1868	Henry Richard	Liberal	Richard Fothergill	Liberal
1880	Henry Richard	Liberal	Charles James	Liberal
1888 by-election (Mar)	Henry Richard	Liberal	D. A. Thomas	Liberal
1888 by-election (Oct)	William Pritchard-Morgan	Liberal	D. A. Thomas	Liberal
1900	Keir Hardie	Labour	D. A. Thomas	Liberal
1910 (Jan)	Keir Hardie	Labour	Sir Edgar Jones	Liberal
1915 by-election	Charles Stanton	Independent Labour	Sir Edgar Jones	Liberal
1916	Charles Stanton	Independent Labour	Sir Edgar Jones	Coalition Liberal
June 1918	Charles Stanton	NDP	Sir Edgar Jones	Coalition Liberal
1918	constituency abolished: see Merthyr and Aberdare			

=== MPs 1950–1983 ===
Election	Member	Party
1950	constituency re-established	
1950	S. O. Davies	Labour
1970	S. O. Davies	Independent Labour
1972 by-election	Ted Rowlands	Labour
1983	constituency abolished: see Merthyr Tydfil & Rhymney	

== Elections 1832–1867 ==
=== Elections in the 1830s ===
General election 1832: Merthyr Tydfil
Party	Candidate	Votes	%
Whig	John Josiah Guest	Unopposed	
Registered electors		502	
Whig win (new seat)			

General election 1835: Merthyr Tydfil
Party	Candidate	Votes	%
Whig	John Josiah Guest	Unopposed	
Registered electors		561	
Whig hold			

General election 1837: Merthyr Tydfil
Party	Candidate	Votes	%
Whig	John Josiah Guest	309	69.6
Conservative	John Bruce Bruce	135	30.4
Majority		174	39.2
Turnout		444	76.3
Registered electors		582	
Whig hold			

=== Elections in the 1840s ===
General election 1841: Merthyr Tydfil
Party	Candidate	Votes	%	±%
Whig	John Josiah Guest	Unopposed		
Registered electors		776		
Whig hold				

General election 1847: Merthyr Tydfil
Party	Candidate	Votes	%	±%
Whig	John Josiah Guest	Unopposed		
Registered electors		822		
Whig hold				

=== Elections in the 1850s ===
General election 1852: Merthyr Tydfil
Party	Candidate	Votes	%	±%
Whig	John Josiah Guest	Unopposed		
Registered electors		938		
Whig hold				

Guest's death caused a by-election.

By-election, 14 December 1852: Merthyr Tydfil
Party	Candidate	Votes	%	±%
Peelite	Henry Bruce	Unopposed		
Peelite gain from Whig				

General election 1857: Merthyr Tydfil
Party	Candidate	Votes	%	±%
Peelite	Henry Bruce	Unopposed		
Registered electors		1,263		
Peelite gain from Whig				

General election 1859: Merthyr Tydfil
Party	Candidate	Votes	%	±%
Liberal	Henry Bruce	800	88.3	N/A
Liberal	Edward Merrick Elderton	106	11.7	N/A
Majority		694	76.6	N/A
Turnout		906	67.2	N/A
Registered electors		1,349		
Liberal hold		Swing	N/A	

=== Elections in the 1860s ===
Bruce was appointed Vice-President of the Committee of the Privy Council for Education, requiring a by-election.

By-election, 25 April 1864: Merthyr Tydfil
Party	Candidate	Votes	%	±%
Liberal	Henry Bruce	Unopposed		
Liberal hold				

General election 1865: Merthyr Tydfil
Party	Candidate	Votes	%	±%
Liberal	Henry Bruce	Unopposed		
Registered electors		1,387		
Liberal hold				

== Elections 1868–1918 ==
=== Elections in the 1860s ===
Seat increased to two members

General election 1868: Merthyr Tydfil
Party	Candidate	Votes	%	±%
Liberal	Henry Richard	11,683	46.9	N/A
Liberal	Richard Fothergill	7,439	29.9	N/A
Liberal	Henry Bruce	5,776	23.2	N/A
Majority		1,663	6.7	N/A
Turnout		12,449 (est)	85.4 (est)	N/A
Registered electors		14,577		
Liberal hold		Swing	N/A	
Liberal win (new seat)				

=== Elections in the 1870s ===
General election 1874: Merthyr Tydfil
Party	Candidate	Votes	%	±%
Liberal	Henry Richard	7,606	39.2	−7.7
Liberal	Richard Fothergill	6,908	35.6	+5.7
Lib-Lab	Thomas Halliday	4,912	25.3	N/A
Majority		1,996	10.3	+3.6
Turnout		9,713 (est)	63.0 (est)	−22.4
Registered electors		15,429		
Liberal hold		Swing		
Liberal hold		Swing		

=== Elections in the 1880s ===
General election 1880: Merthyr Tydfil
Party	Candidate	Votes	%	±%
Liberal	Henry Richard	8,033	40.2	+1.0
Liberal	Charles James	7,526	37.6	+2.0
Conservative	William Lewis	4,445	22.2	New
Majority		3,081	15.4	+5.1
Turnout		12,478 (est)	87.5 (est)	+24.5
Registered electors		14,259		
Liberal hold		Swing		
Liberal hold		Swing		

General election 1885: Merthyr Tydfil
Party	Candidate	Votes	%	±%
Liberal	Henry Richard	Unopposed		
Liberal	Charles James	Unopposed		
Liberal hold				
Liberal hold				

General election 1886: Merthyr Tydfil
Party	Candidate	Votes	%	±%
Liberal	Henry Richard	Unopposed		
Liberal	Charles James	Unopposed		
Liberal hold				
Liberal hold				

James resigned, causing a by-election.

By-election, 14 Mar 1888: Merthyr Tydfil
Party	Candidate	Votes	%	±%
Liberal	D. A. Thomas	Unopposed		
Liberal hold				

Richard died, causing a by-election.

Morgan

By-election, 26 Oct 1888: Merthyr Tydfil
Party	Candidate	Votes	%	±%
Independent Liberal	William Pritchard-Morgan	7,149	59.1	New
Liberal	Richard Foulkes Griffiths	4,956	40.9	N/A
Majority		2,193	18.2	N/A
Turnout		12,105	78.5	N/A
Registered electors		15,411		
Independent Liberal gain from Liberal		Swing	N/A	

=== Elections in the 1890s ===
Thomas

General election 1892: Merthyr Tydfil
Party	Candidate	Votes	%	±%
Liberal	D. A. Thomas	11,948	45.9	N/A
Liberal	William Pritchard-Morgan	11,756	45.2	N/A
Conservative	Benjamin Francis Williams	2,304	8.9	New
Majority		9,452	36.3	N/A
Turnout		14,093 (est)	81.6	N/A
Registered electors		17,271		
Liberal hold		Swing	N/A	
Liberal hold		Swing	N/A	

General election 1895: Merthyr Tydfil
Party	Candidate	Votes	%	±%
Liberal	D. A. Thomas	9,250	37.1	−8.8
Liberal	William Pritchard-Morgan	8,554	34.2	−11.0
Conservative	Herbert Clark Lewis, 2nd Baron Merthyr	6,525	26.1	+17.2
Independent Liberal-Labour	Allen Upward	659	2.6	New
Majority		2,029	8.1	−28.2
Turnout		14,998 (est)	88.1	+6.5
Registered electors		17,024		
Liberal hold		Swing	−13.0	
Liberal hold		Swing	−14.1	

=== Elections in the 1900s ===
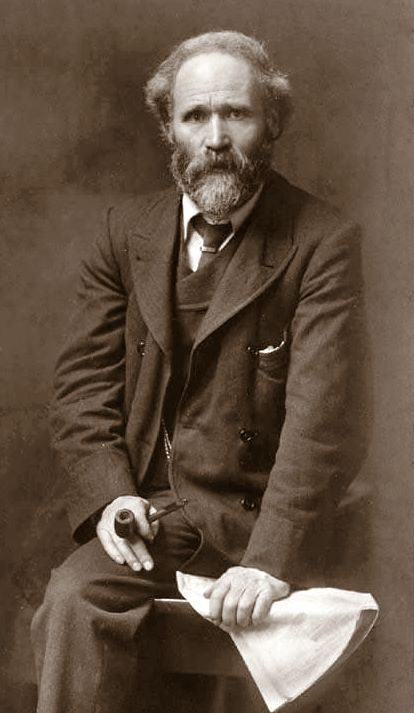
Hardie

General election 1900: Merthyr Tydfil
Party	Candidate	Votes	%	±%
Liberal	D. A. Thomas	8,598	46.9	+9.8
Labour Repr. Cmte.	Keir Hardie	5,745	31.3	New
Liberal	William Pritchard-Morgan	4,004	21.8	−12.4
Majority		1,741	9.5	N/A
Turnout		18,347	73.9	−14.2
Registered electors		15,400		
Liberal hold		Swing		
Labour Repr. Cmte. gain from Liberal		Swing		

General election 1906: Merthyr Tydfil
Party	Candidate	Votes	%	±%
Liberal	D. A. Thomas	13,971	43.7	−3.2
Labour Repr. Cmte.	Keir Hardie	10,187	31.9	+0.6
Liberal	Henry Radcliffe	7,776	24.4	+2.6
Majority		2,411	7.5	−2.0
Turnout		31,934	84.9	+11.0
Registered electors		21,438		
Liberal hold		Swing	−1.9	
Labour Repr. Cmte. hold		Swing	+1.9	

=== Elections in the 1910s ===
General election January 1910: Merthyr Tydfil
Party	Candidate	Votes	%	±%
Liberal	Edgar Jones	15,448	41.0	−2.7
Labour	Keir Hardie	13,841	36.7	+4.8
Conservative	Arthur Fox-Davies	4,756	12.6	New
Independent Liberal	William Pritchard-Morgan	3,639	9.7	New
Majority		10,692	28.4	+9.1
Majority		9,085	24.1	+16.6
Turnout		37,684	93.0	+8.1
Labour hold		Swing		
Liberal hold		Swing		

General election, December 1910: Merthyr Tydfil
Party	Candidate	Votes	%	±%
Liberal	Edgar Jones	12,258	42.2	+1.2
Labour	Keir Hardie	11,507	39.6	+2.9
Liberal Unionist	John Henry Watts	5,277	18.2	+5.6
Majority		6,981	24.0	−4.4
Majority		6,230	21.4	−2.7
Turnout		29.042	81.3	−11.7
Liberal hold		Swing		
Labour hold		Swing		

1915 Merthyr Tydfil by-election
Party	Candidate	Votes	%	±%
Independent Labour	Charles Stanton	10,286	62.8	New
Labour	James Winstone	6,080	37.2	−2.4
Majority		4,206	25.6	N/A
Turnout		16,366	67.7	−13.6
Independent Labour gain from Labour		Swing		

== Elections 1950–1979 ==
=== 1950s ===
General election 1950: Merthyr Tydfil
Party	Candidate	Votes	%
Labour	S. O. Davies	29,210	78.91
Conservative	LF Haddrill	6,294	17.00
Ind. Nationalist	Trefor Morgan	1,511	4.08
Majority		22,916	61.91
Turnout		37,015	85.77
Registered electors			
Labour win (new seat)			

General election 1951: Merthyr Tydfil
Party	Candidate	Votes	%	±%
Labour	S. O. Davies	28,841	79.57	
Conservative	James F Lynam	7,405	20.43	
Majority		21,436	59.14	
Turnout		36,246	84.42	
Labour hold		Swing		

General election 1955: Merthyr Tydfil
Party	Candidate	Votes	%	±%
Labour	S. O. Davies	25,630	77.25	
Conservative	Anthony Arnold	7,548	22.75	
Majority		18,082	54.50	
Turnout		33,178	77.28	
Labour hold		Swing		

General election 1959: Merthyr Tydfil
Party	Candidate	Votes	%	±%
Labour	S. O. Davies	26,608	77.14	
Conservative	Miranda MM Greenaway	7,885	22.86	
Majority		18,723	54.28	
Turnout		34,493	81.83	
Labour hold		Swing		

=== 1960s ===
General election 1964: Merthyr Tydfil
Party	Candidate	Votes	%	±%
Labour	S. O. Davies	23,275	75.27	
Conservative	Sidney W Doxsey	4,767	15.42	
Plaid Cymru	Ioan Bowen Rees	2,878	9.31	New
Majority		18,508	59.85	
Turnout		30,920	76.27	
Labour hold		Swing		

General election 1966: Merthyr Tydfil
Party	Candidate	Votes	%	±%
Labour	S. O. Davies	21,737	74.49	
Conservative	Gerald L Preece	4,082	13.99	
Plaid Cymru	Meic Stephens	3,361	11.52	
Majority		17,655	60.50	
Turnout		29,180	73.92	
Labour hold		Swing		

=== 1970s ===
General election 1970: Merthyr Tydfil
Party	Candidate	Votes	%	±%
Independent Labour	S. O. Davies	16,701	51.90	N/A
Labour	Taliesin J Lloyd	9,234	28.69	−45.80
Conservative	Edward Jones	3,169	9.85	−4.14
Plaid Cymru	Chris Rees	3,076	9.56	−1.96
Majority		7,467	23.21	N/A
Turnout		32,180	77.92	+4.00
Independent Labour gain from Labour		Swing	+40.30	

NB: Davies claimed to be 83 in 1970 and his Constituency Labour Party felt that he was too old and ought to stand down. They thus de-selected him in favour of a younger man. However, although his true birth date is unconfirmed, Davies was undoubtedly several years older than he claimed, and was probably close to 90 years old when he fought and won the election as an independent.

1972 Merthyr Tydfil by-election
Party	Candidate	Votes	%	±%
Labour	Edward Rowlands	15,562	48.58	+19.89
Plaid Cymru	Emrys Roberts	11,852	37.00	+27.44
Conservative	Christopher Barr	2,336	7.29	−2.56
Communist	Arthur Lewis Jones	1,519	4.74	New
Liberal	Angus Donaldson	765	2.39	New
Majority		3,710	11.58	N/A
Turnout		32,034	79.5	−1.6
Labour gain from Independent Labour		Swing		

General election February 1974: Merthyr Tydfil
Party	Candidate	Votes	%	±%
Labour	Edward Rowlands	20,486	64.07	
Plaid Cymru	Emrys Roberts	7,336	22.94	
Conservative	Michael Knowles	2,622	8.20	
Liberal	D Bettell-Higgins	1,002	3.13	
Communist	A Jones	369	1.15	N/A
Workers Revolutionary	R Battersby	160	0.50	New
Majority		13,150	41.13	
Turnout		32,015	81.06	
Labour gain from Independent		Swing		

General election October 1974: Merthyr Tydfil
Party	Candidate	Votes	%	±%
Labour	Edward Rowlands	21,260	70.61	
Plaid Cymru	Emrys Roberts	4,455	14.80	
Conservative	LJ Walters	2,587	8.59	
Liberal	D Bettall-Higgins	1,300	4.32	
Communist	T Roberts	509	1.69	
Majority		16,805	55.81	
Turnout		30,111	75.82	
Labour hold		Swing		

General election 1979: Merthyr Tydfil
Party	Candidate	Votes	%	±%
Labour	Edward Rowlands	22,386	71.32	
Conservative	AR de Wilde	4,426	14.10	
Plaid Cymru	Eurfyl ap Gwilym	2,962	9.44	
Liberal	RD Oliver	1,275	4.06	
Communist	CC Dennett	223	0.71	
Workers Revolutionary	GT Gould	114	0.36	New
Majority		17,960	57.22	
Turnout		31,386	79.10	
Labour hold		Swing		

== Bibliography ==
- Jones, Ieuan Gwynedd (1965). "Dr Thomas Price and the election of 1868 in Merthyr Tydfil: a study in nonconformist politics (Part Two)" (PDF). Welsh History Review. 2 (3): 251–70.
- Morgan, Kenneth O. (1960). "Democratic Politics in Glamorgan, 1884–1914". Morgannwg. 4: 5–27.
