= R. C. Wallhead =

British Member of Parliament

Richard Collingham Wallhead (28 December 1869 – 27 April 1934), known as R. C. Wallhead, was a British Member of Parliament.

Beginning his career as a decorator, Wallhead joined the Independent Labour Party (ILP) and later became a journalist and lecturer. A committed opponent of World War I, he was detained in 1917 under the Defence of the Realm Act.

Wallhead unsuccessfully contested Coventry in the 1918 general election for the Labour Party, to which the ILP was affiliated. He was elected to Manchester City Council in 1919, a position he held for three years.

In April 1922 he attended the Conference of the Three Internationals in Berlin where he was part of the delegation from the International Working Union of Socialist Parties also known as the Vienna International or the 2½ International.

At the 1922 general election, Wallhead gained Merthyr from the Liberals. As the politics of the South Wales coalfield radicalised, this turned into a safe Labour seat, which he was to hold until his death. He was one of only five ILP MPs to retain their seats in the 1931 general election, after Labour withdrew their support, and initially supported their disaffiliation from Labour. However, in September 1933 he resigned from the ILP and rejoined Labour. He died the following year.

His daughter Muriel Nichol was also a Labour politician, and served as MP for Bradford North from 1945 to 1950.

Parliament of the United Kingdom
Preceded by Edgar Jones	Member of Parliament for Merthyr; 1922–1934	Succeeded by S. O. Davies
Party political offices
Preceded by C. T. Douthwaite	Lancashire Division representative on the Independent Labour Party National Administrative Council; 1911–1920	Succeeded by James Hudson
Preceded by Philip Snowden	Chairman of the Independent Labour Party; 1920–1922	Succeeded by Clifford Allen
