= October 1888 Merthyr Tydfil by-election =

UK parliamentary by-election in Wales

The October 1888 Merthyr Tydfil by-election was a parliamentary by-election held for the UK House of Commons constituency of Merthyr Tydfil in Wales on 26 October 1888.

== Vacancy ==
The by-election was caused by the death of the sitting Liberal MP, Henry Richard on 20 August 1888.

== Candidates ==
Two candidates nominated.

The Liberal Party nominated Baptist Minister Richard Foulkes Griffiths.

Welsh solicitor, mine owner, and company promoter William Pritchard-Morgan ran as an Independent Liberal

== Result ==
The Independent Liberal gained the seat from the Liberal Party.

October 1888 Merthyr Tydfil by-election
Party	Candidate	Votes	%	±%
Independent Liberal	William Pritchard-Morgan	7,149	59.1	N/A
Liberal	Richard Foulkes Griffiths	4,956	40.9	N/A
Majority		2,193	18.2	N/A
Turnout		12,105	78.5	N/A
Registered electors		15,411		
Independent Liberal gain from Liberal		Swing	N/A	
