= Charles James (MP) =

Welsh politician

Charles Herbert James (16 June 1817 – 10 October 1890) was a Welsh politician. He was elected as a Liberal Member of Parliament for Merthyr Tydfil in 1880, resigning in 1888 by becoming Steward of the Manor of Northstead.

Parliament of the United Kingdom
Preceded by Richard Fothergill	Member of Parliament for Merthyr Tydfil; 1880–1888	Succeeded by D. A. Thomas
