= Dillwyn =

Dillwyn may refer to the following:

== Places ==
- Dillwyn, Kansas, an unincorporated community in Stafford County
- Dillwyn, Virginia, an incorporated town in Buckingham County

== People with the surname ==
- Amy Dillwyn (1845-1935), Welsh novelist
- Lewis Llewelyn Dillwyn (1814-1892), Welsh industrialist and Liberal politician
- Lewis Weston Dillwyn (1778-1855), British porcelain manufacturer, naturalist and MP
- Mary Dillwyn (1816–1906), early Welsh photographer
- Mary De la Beche Nicholl (née Dillwyn) (1839–1922), lepidopterist and mountaineer
- William Dillwyn (1743–1824) American-born British Quaker and abolitionist

== People with the given name ==
- Dillwyn Parrish (1894—1941), American writer, illustrator and painter
- Dilly Knox, born Alfred Dillwyn Knox (1884–1943), British codebreaker
- John Dillwyn Llewelyn (1810–1882) Welsh botanist and photographer
- Thereza Dillwyn Llewelyn (1834–1926) astronomer and photographer
- William Dillwyn Sims (1825–1895) English industrialist and artist
