= Richard Dykes Alexander =

British banker, philanthropist and photographer, 1788–1865

Richard Dykes Alexander (15 August 1788 – 1865) was a businessman and philanthropist based in Ipswich, Suffolk.

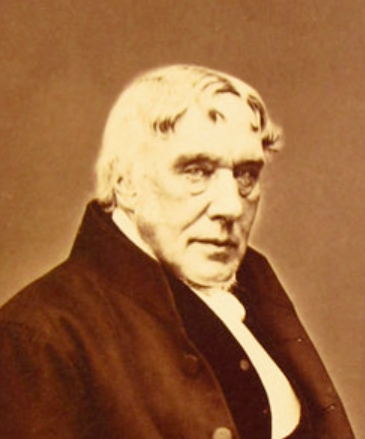
Richard Dykes Alexander

== Family life ==
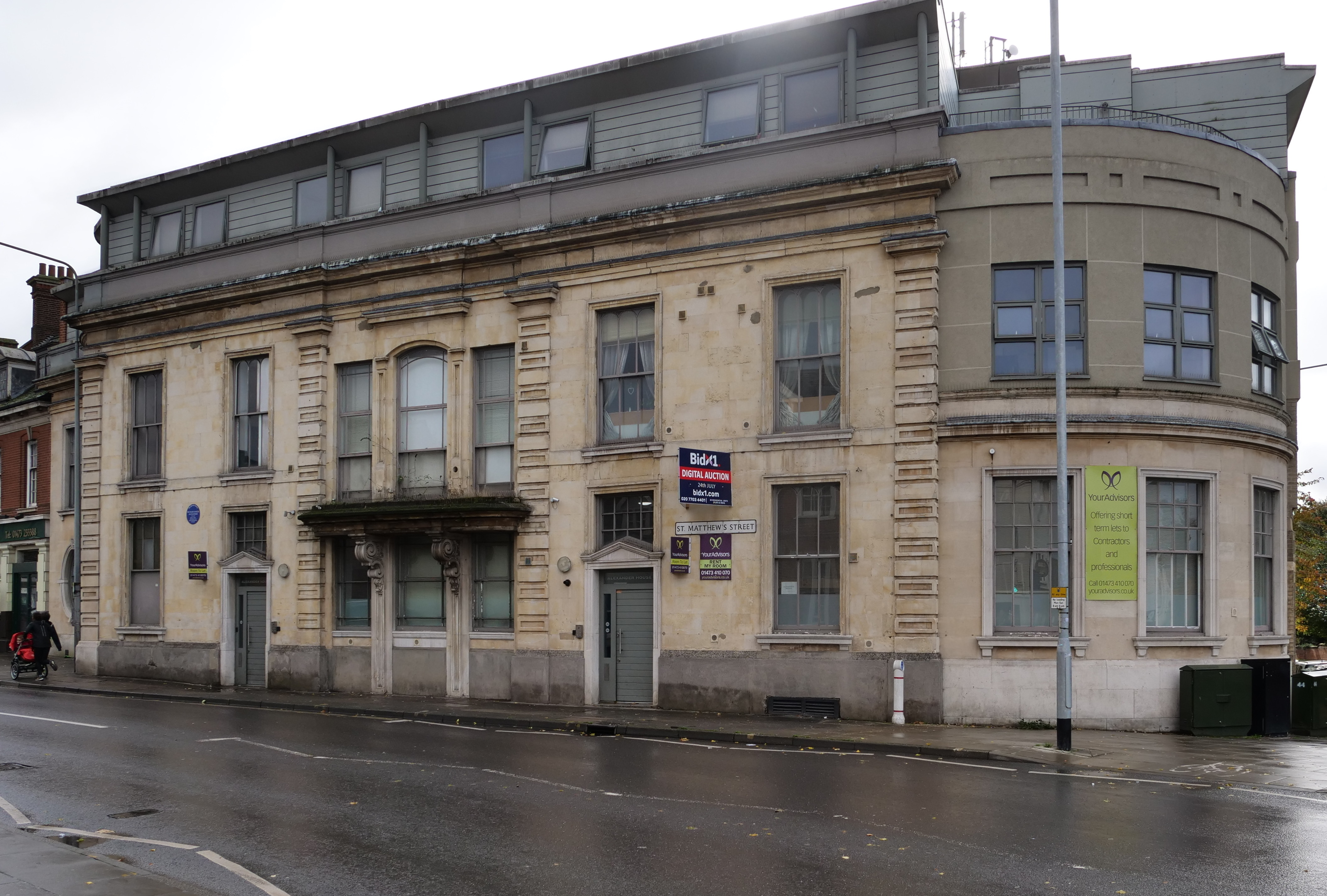
Alexander House, Ipswich

He was the son of Dykes Alexander (1763–1849) and Hannah Brewster. His parents were Quakers, and he followed his father into the banking business in Ipswich.

In 1810, he married Ann Dillwyn, daughter of William Dillwyn and Sarah Dillwyn of Higham Lodge, Walthamstow. He built Alexander House for his family on the junction of St. Matthews Street and Portman Road. In 2009, this building was refurbished for use as student flats. Ann Dillwyn's sister, Lydia Dillwyn, married John Sims, making their son, William Dillwyn Sims, a local industrialist, his nephew.

== Business career ==
Richard went into his father's banking business at the age of 15, becoming a partner when he reached the age of majority, i.e., 21. He retired around 1830 for health reasons and devoted himself to religious and worthy causes. Nevertheless, he retained some business appointments until his death: he was chairman of the Ipswich Dock Commission and the Ipswich branch of the Suffolk Alliance Fire Office. He was also a director of the Ipswich Water Works Company.

== Other activities ==
He played a major role in the local Quaker community and in the temperance movement. He was a friend of Thomas Clarkson, who lived in nearby Playford, Suffolk. They shared abolitionist sympathies and were both committee members of the Peace Society.

In 1849, he was the founder of the Ipswich Ragged School, based in Waterworks Street. He attended the first meeting of the Ipswich and Suffolk Freehold Land Society, at which he took on the role of President for the organisation.

When he provided land for development in the 1850s, he ensured that some streets should be named after several abolitionists. These included Dillwyn Street, which could refer to his father-in-law, William, or the anti-slavery MP, Lewis Weston Dillwyn, his brother-in-law.

=== Photography ===
He became a noted pioneer of photography and was supported in this by William Cobb who acted as his assistant and ran a photography business across the road from him in London Road. Three years after Alexander's death, Cobb sold his business to William Vick. Despite complaining that his health had been seriously damaged by the exposure to chemicals he subsequently ran a family photography business in Woolwich.

His nephew John Dillwyn Llewelyn and niece Mary Dillwyn shared his interest in photography.

=== Gallery ===
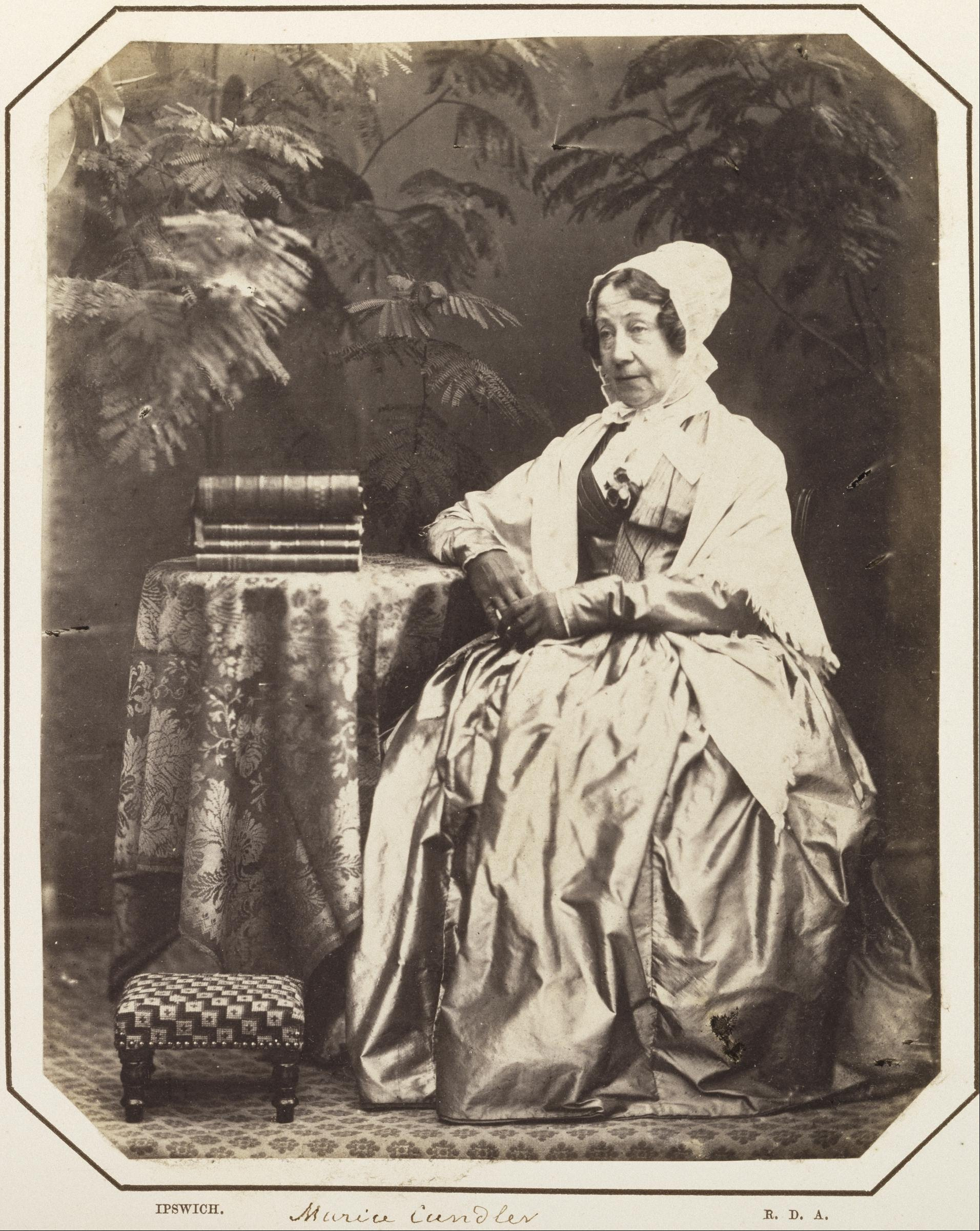
Maria Candler, Essex abolitionist
