= William Dillwyn =

American-born Quaker abolitionist (1743–1824)

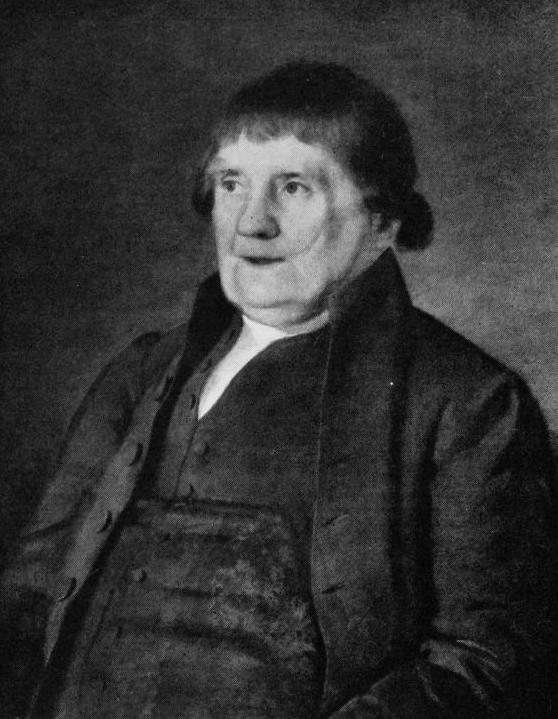
- portrait by Charles Leslie
- Born: c. 1743; Philadelphia
- Died: 28 September 1824
- Spouse(s): Sarah Logan Smith, Sarah Weston
- Children: 9, including Lewis Weston Dillwyn

William Dillwyn (1743, Philadelphia – 28 September 1824) was a Philadelphia-born Quaker of Welsh descent, active in the abolitionist movement in colonial America and after 1774, Great Britain. He was one of the twelve committee members of the Society for Effecting the Abolition of the Slave Trade when it was formed in 1787.

William was the son of John Dillwyn and Susanna Painter. He attended the Friends' English School of Philadelphia where he was taught by Anthony Benezet. His elder brother was George Dillwyn (1738-1820), the Quaker minister.

== Family ==
William Dillwyn was descended from his grandfather, also William Dillwyn who emigrated in 1699 from the Breconshire to settle in the Welsh tract of Pennsylvania.

William married Sarah Logan Smith on 19 May 1768, in Burlington County, New Jersey. Together they had a daughter Susanna, born in New Jersey, on 31 March 1769. She married Samuel Emlen on April 16, 1795.

William remarried on 27 November 1777, to Sarah Weston in Tottenham, then in Middlesex. Their children were:

- Lewis Weston Dillwyn (1778–1855)
- John Crook Dillwyn (1780–1781)
- Judith Nickolls (Dillwyn) Bevan (1781–1868)
- Ann Dillwyn (1783), married Richard Dykes Alexander of Ipswich
- Lydia (Dillwyn) Sims (1785–1830) married John Sims – William Dillwyn Sims was their son.
- George Dillwyn
- Sarah Musgrave Dillwyn (1790)
- Gulielma Dillwyn (1792)

Through his son Lewis Weston Dillwyn and his wife, Mary Adams of Penllergaer, Llangyfelach, he was the grandfather of noted photographer John Dillwyn Llewelyn (1810–1882), MP for Swansea Lewis Llewelyn Dillwyn (1814-1892) and pioneering female photographer Mary Dillwyn (1816-1906).

His great granddaughter by his grandson John was the Welsh astronomer and pioneer in scientific photography Thereza Dillwyn Llewelyn, and his great granddaughters by his grandson Lewis were the novelist and industrialist Amy Dillwyn and lepidopterist Mary De la Beche Nicholl.

== Commemoration ==
Dillwyn Street, Ipswich is named after him. His son-in-law, Richard Dykes Alexander stipulated that some street names should commemorate leading abolitionists when he provided the land for the development of which this road was a part.
