= Lewis Dillwyn =

Lewis Dillwyn may refer to:

- Lewis Llewelyn Dillwyn (1814–1892), Welsh industrialist and Member of Parliament
- Lewis Weston Dillwyn (1778–1855), British porcelain manufacturer, naturalist and Member of Parliament
