= California, Ipswich =

Area of Ipswich, Suffolk, England

Coordinates: 52.057709°N 1.1842328°E

California
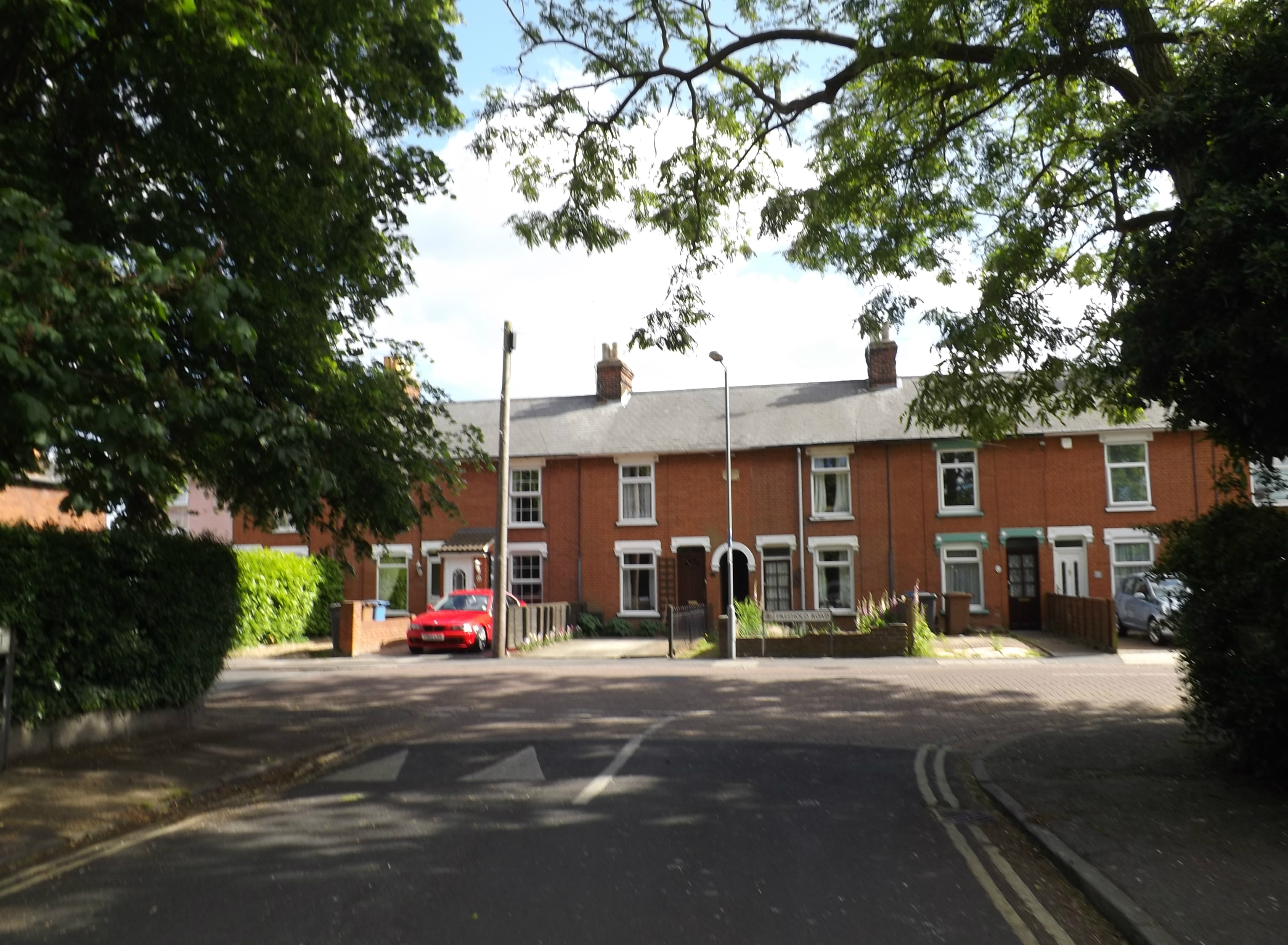
- Freehold Road, as seen from Cowper Street

- Location within Suffolk
- District: Ipswich
- Shire county: Suffolk
- Region: East
- Country: England
- Sovereign state: United Kingdom
- Post town: IPSWICH
- Postcode district: IP4
- Dialling code: 01473

California is an area of the town of Ipswich, in the Ipswich district, in the county of Suffolk, England, which was developed by the Ipswich and Suffolk Freehold Land Society (FLS) in the mid-19th century. The FLS was founded in 1849, the year of the California gold rush. This gave rise to the nickname of the area, which was originally called the Cauldwell Hall Estate.

== History ==
The suburb of California was set up by the Ipswich and Suffolk Freehold Land Society (FLS), now formally known as the Ipswich Building Society, in 1849.

Initially, the society was set up in order to help address the poor housing problem that had plagued Ipswich. The society also hoped to gain votes from the residents who could support the cause of further social and political reform in England.

The FLS acquired Cauldwell Hall, a 99 acre estate located between Foxhall and Woodbridge Roads, in 1849 and was criticised at first for the land being too far from the town centre of Ipswich. This made the site seem like a rural area however, the FLS had planned for long-term growth.

Over time, as Ipswich grew and expanded it absorbed the estate, which then became significant enough to be provided with its own railway station, Derby Road, connecting it to the new Felixstowe branch line.

In the early stages of the FLS, they would acquire land, dividing it into plots and laying out roads. The plots were then allotted to members of the FLS who could become freehold owners through subscription payments.

The success of the Cauldwell Hall estate laid the foundations of the FLS, with the name 'California' becoming apparent during the rush of investment in 1849, which was associated with the California gold rush of the same year.

== Landmarks ==
The Derby Road railway station is located in southern California.
