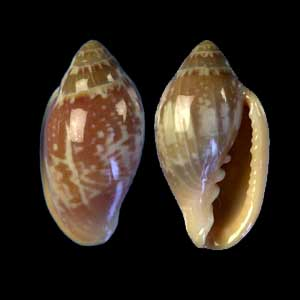
- Apertural (right) and abapertural (left) views of a shell of M. aurantia

Scientific classification
- Kingdom: Animalia
- Phylum: Mollusca
- Class: Gastropoda
- Subclass: Caenogastropoda
- Order: Neogastropoda
- Family: Marginellidae
- Subfamily: Marginellinae
- Genus: Marginella
- Species: M. aurantia

Binomial name
- Marginella aurantia Lamarck, 1822

Synonyms
- Marginella (Marginella) aurantia Lamarck, 1822· accepted, alternate representation; Marginella castanea Dillwyn, 1817

= Marginella aurantia =

Species of gastropod

Marginella aurantia is a species of sea snail, a marine gastropod mollusk in the family Marginellidae, the margin snails.

== Distribution ==
This marine species occurs off Senegal.
