= Conus scabriusculus =

Scientific classification
- Kingdom: Animalia
- Phylum: Mollusca
- Class: Gastropoda
- Subclass: Caenogastropoda
- Order: Neogastropoda
- Superfamily: Conoidea
- Family: Conidae
- Genus: Conus
- Species: C. scabriusculus

Binomial name
- Conus scabriusculus Dillwyn, 1817

Synonyms
- Conus (Leporiconus) scabriusculus (Dillwyn, 1817); Leporiconus scabriusculus (Dillwyn, 1817)

Species of gastropod

Conus scabriusculus is a species of sea snail, a marine gastropod mollusk, in the family Conidae, the cone snails and their allies.
