= William Vick =

English photography pioneer

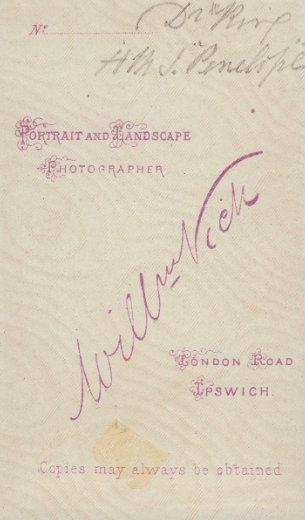
William Vick's business card

William Vick (1833, Ebley – 15 April 1911, Merton) was an English photographer active in Ipswich, Suffolk from 1868 until the 1890s.

William was baptised in King's Stanley, Gloucestershire on 25 August 1833. He was the son of a millwright. His first marriage was to Joyce Webb in 1858 and his initial career was as a teacher in Cainscross, Gloucestershire. Joyce bore William three sons before dying, and William remarried Mary Ann Aga in 1865. In 1868 he bought the photographic business of William Cobb of Ipswich and the family settled in London Road, Ipswich. Cobb had been the photographic assistant to Richard Dykes Alexander, the prominent banker and pioneer photographer who had lived across the road from Cobb at Alexander House until his death in 1865.

Vick described himself as a "photographic artist" in the 1871 and 1881 censuses, but subsequently simply used the term "photographer". When he retired in 1899 he sold his stock of about 10,000 glass plate negatives which were purchased by public subscription and placed in Ipswich Museum. In 1950 these were then deposited in the Ipswich and East Suffolk Records Office.

== Gallery ==
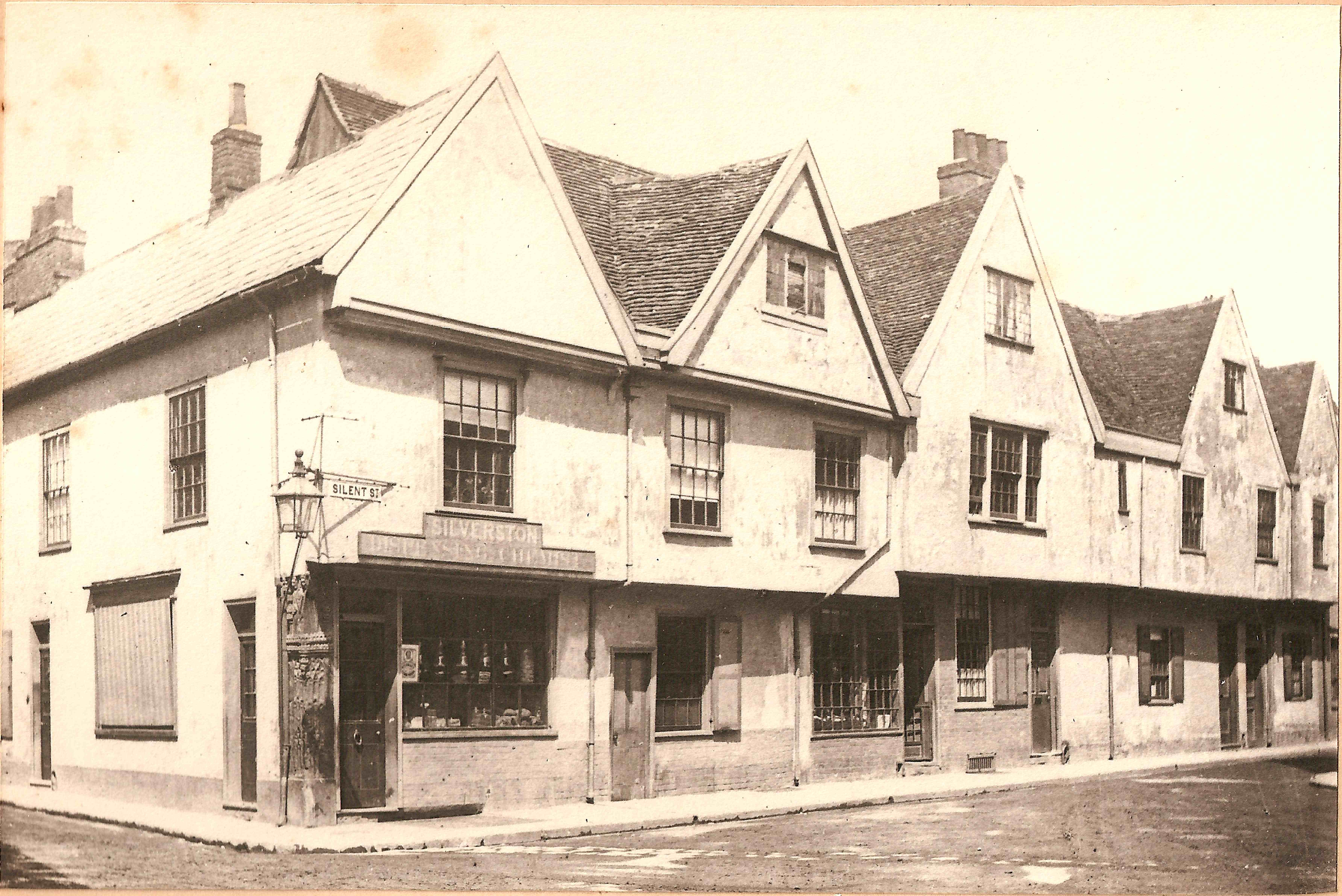
Curson Lodge 1890

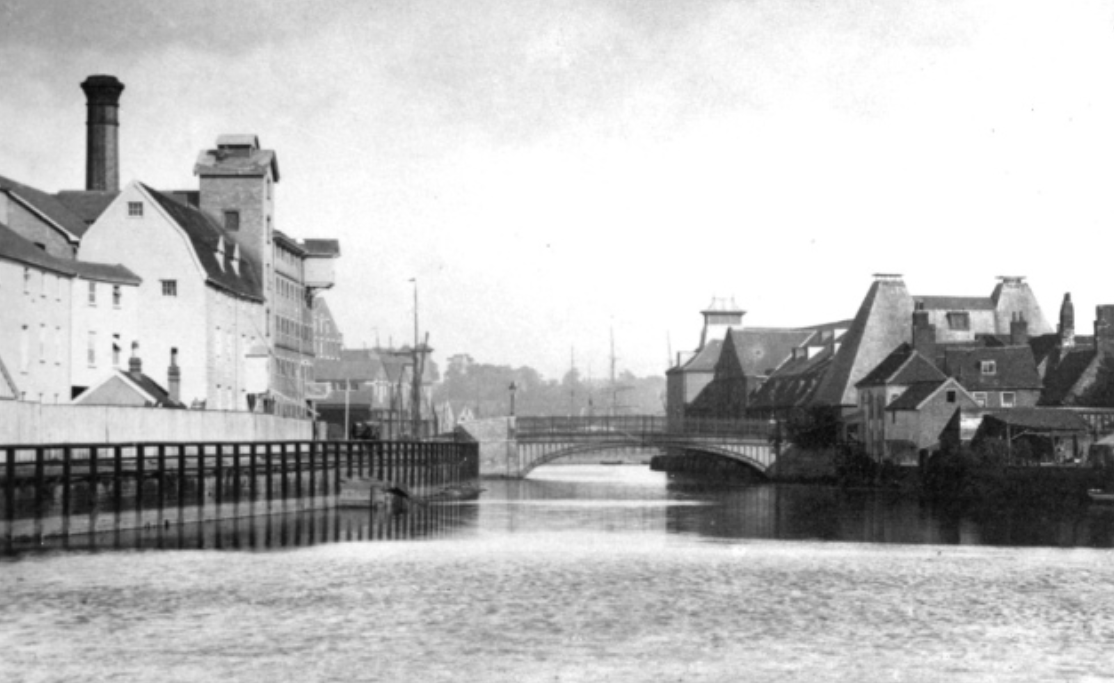
Stoke Bridge and Stoke Mill, Ipswich 1880
