= Amy Dillwyn =

Welsh novelist and businesswoman (1845–1935)

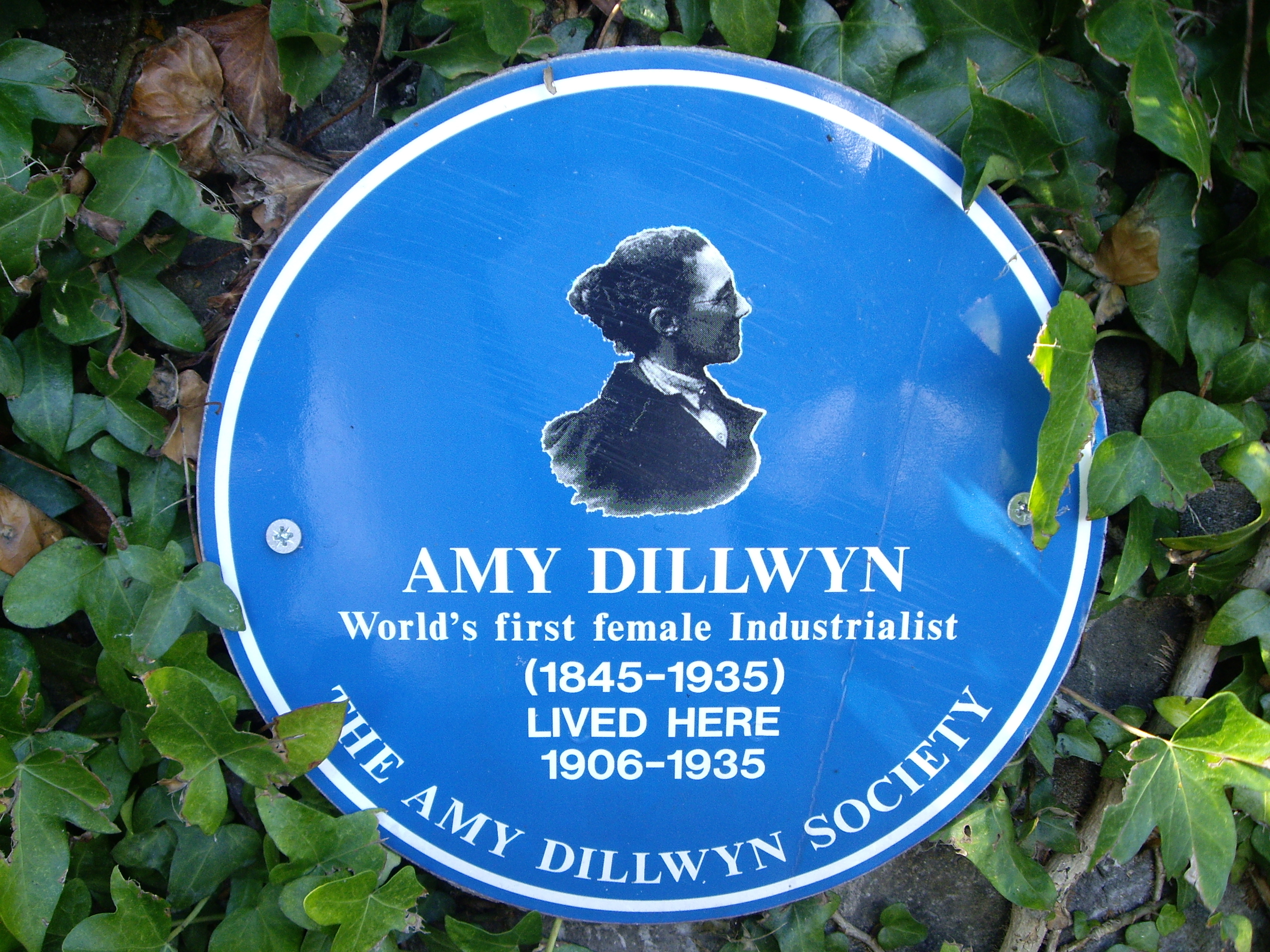
- Plaque dedicated to Dillwyn in Swansea
- Born: 16 May 1845; Sketty, Swansea, Wales
- Died: 13 December 1935 (aged 90)
- Parent: Lewis Llewelyn Dillwyn
- Relatives: Mary De la Beche Nicholl (sister); John Dillwyn Llewelyn (uncle); Mary Dillwyn (aunt); Thereza Dillwyn Llewelyn (cousin); Lewis Weston Dillwyn (grandfather); Henry De la Beche (grandfather)
- Writing career
- Genres: Feminism, social reform
- Notable works: The Rebecca Rioter; Jill

Elizabeth Amy Dillwyn (16 May 1845 – 13 December 1935) was a Welsh novelist, businesswoman, and social benefactor. She was one of the first female industrialists in Britain.

== Biography ==
Born in Sketty, Swansea, Dillwyn was the daughter of Lewis Llewelyn Dillwyn and Elizabeth (née De la Beche). She had an older sister and brother, Mary (born 1839) and Henry (born 1843) and a younger sister, Sarah (born 1852).

In 1864 her fiancé, Llewelyn Thomas of Llwynmadog, died shortly before their planned wedding. Although she never married, research into Dillwyn's life has also shown a close relationship with Olive Talbot through letters, who she called her "wife" in diaries. From this, some theorise that the unrequited love in her novels was inspired by this real relationship.

From the 1870s to the early 1890s, Dillwyn wrote six novels. Her themes included feminism, social reform, and a favourable view of the Rebecca Riots (1839–1843) in response to unfair taxation.

Following the deaths of her brother in 1890 and her father in 1892, Amy Dillwyn lost the family home at Hendrefoilan due to its being entailed to the male line. Dillwyn inherited her father's debts of over £100,000 (£8 million or more today) and his spelter works at Llansamlet. She wore a bright purple skirt, with a yellow rose in her belt and flowers in her hat, to her father's funeral, in a statement against the Victorian conventions of elaborate funerals, which could cause families to get into debt from buying mourning clothing in haste.

Dillwyn was able to rescue her father's spelter works, which she managed herself, and thus saved 300 jobs. She lived in lodgings until the business was saved, eventually moving into Tŷ Glyn, her home for the rest of her life. It took until 1899 for "Dillwyn & Co". to pay off the last of its creditors and begin returning a profit. In 1902, Dillwyn registered the business as a registered company.

She was a strong supporter of social justice and gave her support to striking seamstresses. Her unorthodox appearance, her habit of smoking cigars and her lifestyle made her a well-known figure in the local community. When the National Union of Women's Suffrage Societies was formed at the turn of the century, Dillwyn joined as one of the earliest supporters in Wales. Although rejecting the militant actions of some members, she was still a staunch member of the movement. She was nicknamed "The Pioneer" by friends.

== Family ==
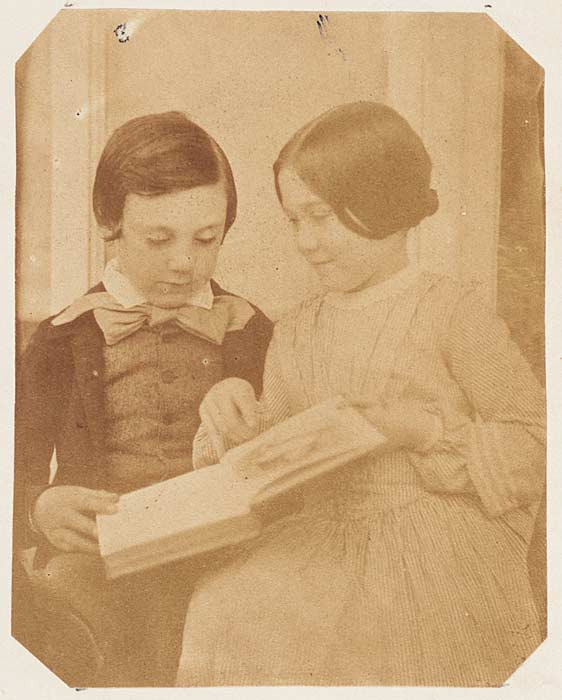
Amy Dillwyn and her brother Harry, photographed by Mary Dillwyn.

Dillwyn's family was prominent. Her father was an industrialist and a Liberal MP from 1855 to 1892. Her older sister was the lepidopterist Mary De la Beche Nicholl; her paternal uncle was the botanist and photographer John Dillwyn Llewelyn; her paternal aunt was the photographer Mary Dillwyn; and her paternal first cousin was the astronomer and photographer Thereza Dillwyn Llewelyn. Dillwyn's paternal grandfather was the businessman, naturalist, and politician Lewis Weston Dillwyn, while her maternal grandfather was the geologist and palaeontologist Henry De la Beche. Dillwyn's paternal great-grandfather was the American abolitionist William Dillwyn, who had migrated to Great Britain.

Her uncle was John Dillwyn Llewelyn of Penllergare who, along with his wife Emma Thomasina Talbot, his sister (Amy's aunt) Mary Dillwyn and his daughter (Amy's cousin) Theresa Story Maskelyne (née Dillwyn-Llewellyn) were pioneers of early photography. Her paternal grandfather was the naturalist Lewis Weston Dillwyn and her maternal grandfather was the geologist Henry De la Beche. The Dillwyn family were originally Quakers and her great-grandfather was William Dillwyn, the anti-slavery campaigner from Pennsylvania who returned to campaign in Britain.

== Death ==
Dillwyn died in Swansea on 13 December 1935, at the age of ninety. She was cremated and her ashes buried in the churchyard of St Paul's Church, Sketty. Probate was granted to Rice Mansel Dillwyn and her estate was valued at £114,513 7s 9d.

== Legacy ==
Her house, Tŷ Glyn (now Mumbles Nursing Home), still stands at West Cross, Swansea and a Blue plaque has been installed on its boundary wall.

In 2018, Dillwyn (representing women in business) was chosen as one of the top 100 Welsh Women by Women's Equality Network Wales, in their project to mark the centenary of the Representation of the People Act 1918, granting some women the vote.

Amy Dillwyn's life has inspired works of art and drama.

== Novels ==
Amy Dillwyn started writing in the 1870s, stating "I've an idea I will try and write one chapter and see how I like it". The Rebecca Rioter (as The Rebecca Rioter: A Story of Killay Life) was published by Macmillan in 1880, by "E. A. Dillwyn". Telling the fictionalised account of a Rebecca rioter, loyal to the cause even when transported to Australia, the novel shows Dillwyn's political views, liberal towards the Rebecca rioters and against English rule, despite her father's part in squashing the riots. Both The Rebecca Rioter and Chloe Arguelle were translated as into Russian by members of the liberal intelligentsia.

Her novel Jill was the most commercially successful, with the original July 1884 print selling out, causing it to be reprinted in September of the same year. She eventually satisfied the reviewers' calls for a sequel with the 1887 Jill and Jack.

Dillwyn also contributed to the Spectator regularly in the 1880s.

Both David Painting and Kirsti Bohata identify recurring themes in her novels of crusading social reform, unrequited love and criticism of the upper classes. Feminist concerns predominate, however, and many of her stories had tomboyish women as protagonists.

== Works ==
- The Rebecca Rioter (1880) (reprinted 2004 by Honno)
- Chloe Arguelle (1881)
- A Burglary; or Unconscious Influence (1883) (reprinted 2009 by Honno)
- Jill (1884) (reprinted 2013 by Honno)
- Nant Olchfa (serialised in The Red Dragon: The National Magazine of Wales, Vols X-XI, 1886–7)
- Jill and Jack (1887)
- Maggie Steele's Diary (1892)
