= Mary De la Beche Nicholl =

British artist, scientific illustrator, naturalist, lepidopterist

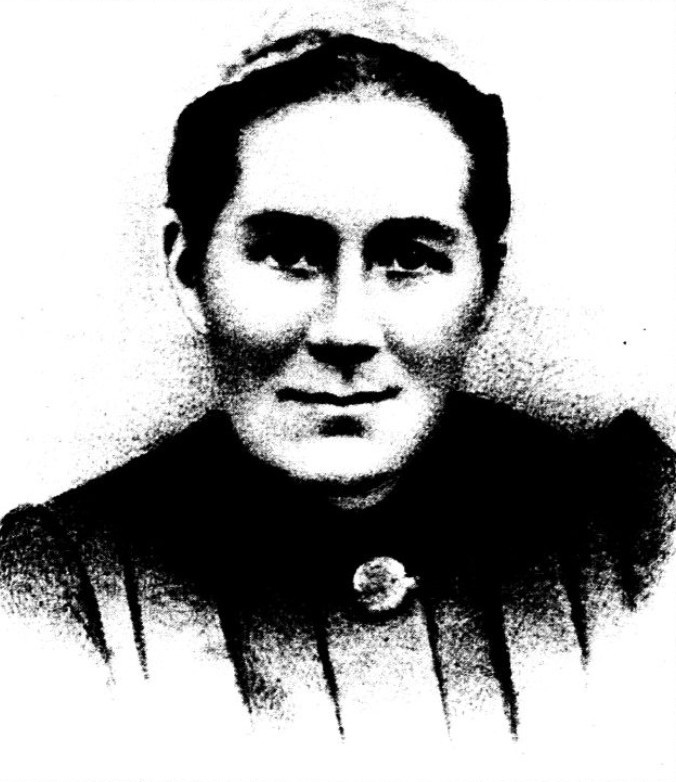
- Born: Mary De la Beche Dillwyn; June 25, 1839
- Died: October 30, 1922 (aged 83)
- Occupations: lepidopterist and mountaineer
- Known for: Lepidoptera research and collecting
- Father: Lewis Llewelyn Dillwyn

Mary De la Beche "Minnie" Nicholl FES (née Dillwyn; 25 June 1839 – 30 October 1922) was a lepidopterist and mountaineer.

== Family ==
Nicholl was born in Swansea in 1839. She was the daughter of Lewis Llewelyn Dillwyn and Elizabeth (née De la Beche). She had an older brother Henry (b. 1843) who became a barrister. and two younger sisters, Amy Dillwyn (b.1845) a novelist and industrialist, and Sarah, known as Essie (b. 1852) who became an actress after a divorce.

Her uncle was John Dillwyn-Llewelyn of Penllergare who, along with his wife, Emma Thomasina Talbot, his sister (Mary's aunt) Mary Dillwyn and his daughter (Mary's cousin) Theresa Story Maskelyne (née Dillwyn-Llewellyn) were pioneers of early photography. Her paternal grandfather was the naturalist Lewis Weston Dillwyn and her maternal grandfather was geologist Sir Henry De La Beche. The Dillwyn family were originally Quakers and her great-grandfather was William Dillwyn, the anti-slavery campaigner from Pennsylvania who returned to campaign in Britain.

She married John Cole Nicholl on Swansea in 1860, and had six children. She died in Bridgend, Wales, in 1922.

== Alpinism ==
Nicholl was a fearless ascender of mountains, in Europe and in north America. Her biography, based on her notebooks and diaries, shows that she was never happier than when making extremely hazardous climbs or river crossings. Her husband shared this personality trait of extreme adrenalin junky.

== Lepidoptery ==
Nicholl was best known for her work on butterflies. Nicholl published a number of papers on her research on butterflies between 1897 and 1904, including "Bulgarian Butterflies" in The Entomologist's Record and Journal of Variation (1899) and "Butterflies of the Lebanon" was published in The Transactions of the Royal Entomological Society of London (1902).

== Biography ==
A biography of Mary De la Beche Nicholl was published in 1979 titled: Grandmother Extraordinary.
