= St David's Church, Bettws =

Church in Bridgend County Borough, Wales

Coordinates: 51°34′7″N 3°35′23″W

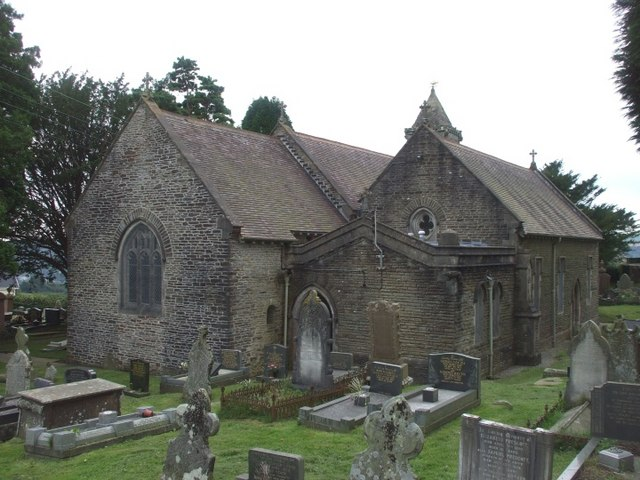
St David's Church, Bettws

St David's Church is a Grade I listed church in Bettws, Bridgend County Borough, southern Wales. The church is believed to date to the 12th century, though was dedicated to St David later on. There is mention of the church in a charter of the Bishop of Llandaff, who died in 1183. The current church is largely of the 15th–16th century. In 1893 the church was underwent renovation following funding from Olive Talbot of Margam. She funded the addition of an aisle on the northern side, built by G Halliday. One roof truss from the original building remains in the porch. Inside the church is a painted wooden monument to weaver John Bradford (1690–1780) of Y Pandy, and wall monuments in memory of Calvinistic preacher Rees Price, and members of local families such as the Trahernes. St David's Church became a Grade I listed building on 30 July 1997.
