= Stoke Mill, Ipswich =

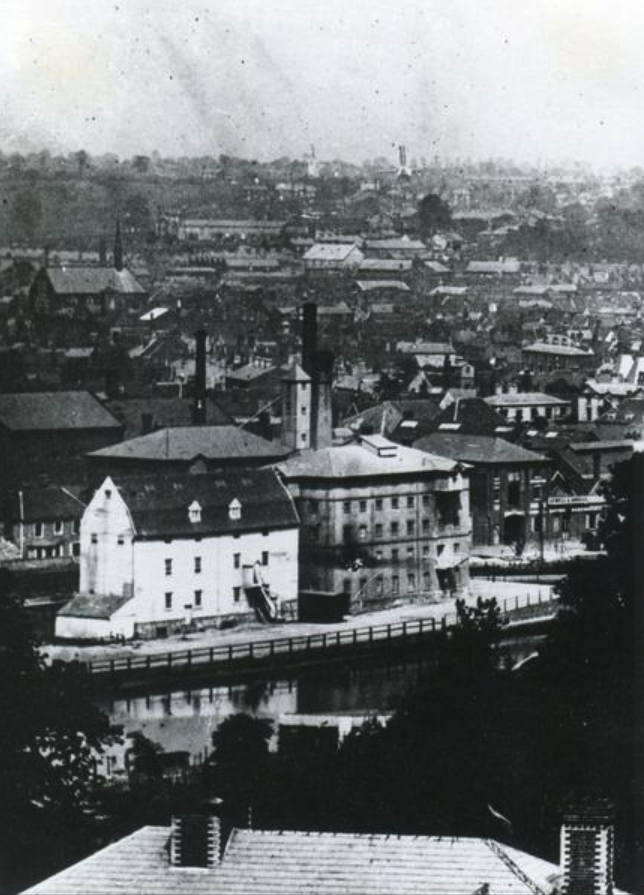
- Stoke Mill, Ipswich, 1880 photographed by William Vick
- Interactive map of the Stoke Mill, Ipswich area

General information
- Status: Demolished
- Type: Watermill; Tidal mill
- Location: Stoke Bridge, Ipswich, Ipswich, United Kingdom
- Coordinates: 52.052°N 1.153°E

Stoke Mill was an historic watermill located in Ipswich, Suffolk. It was located on the north bank of the River Orwell next to Stoke Bridge. It was on Bridge Street where there is now a skate park.
