= Olive Talbot =

Welsh aristocrat

Olive Emma Talbot (October 1842 – October 1894) was a Welsh aristocrat of the prominent Talbot family of Glamorgan. She was a patron of Welsh church construction and restoration, and a close friend of Amy Dillwyn.

== Early life ==
Olivia Emma Talbot was born in 1842 in London, daughter of the wealthy industrialist and politician Christopher Rice Mansel Talbot and his wife, Lady Charlotte Butler, daughter of Richard Butler, 1st Earl of Glengall. She was just four years old at the time of her mother's death.

== Church patronage ==
St Nicholas Church, Nicholaston – one of the churches restored with funding from Olive Talbot

Olive Talbot was physically disabled and confined with a spinal condition for much of her life. She used her inheritance after her father's death in 1890 to support building and restoration projects at churches in Glamorgan. She funded the building of St Michael's College in Llandaff and rebuilding work on St David's Church in Bettws in 1894, shortly before her death. She also donated significant pieces of antique silver and gold church furnishings, chalices and patens to Welsh Catholic churches. Commented a contemporary, "Her memory is revered by multitudes of worshippers in churches restored at her sole cost, in many mountain solitudes and busy industrial vales."

Talbot, a teetotaller, donated land on what is now Talbot Street in Maesteg. As part of the agreement it was prohibited to sell alcohol on the street, and as a result for well over a century it was believed to be the only teetotal high street in Britain. In 2012 the tradition ended when an Indian restaurant received permission to sell alcoholic drinks on the premises.

Olive Talbot died in 1894, just before her 52nd birthday, in London. Her remains were placed at Margam Abbey, with a memorial tablet. One of her biggest projects, the church of St Nicholas in Nicholaston, Gower, was completed just two months after she died.

Her sister Emily Charlotte Talbot funded the building of St Theodore's Church in Port Talbot in her memory and in memory of their brother Theodore, who died in a hunting accident in 1876. The Church of St Michael and All Angels at Maesteg was also built as a memorial to Olive Talbot's generosity.

== Friendship with Amy Dillwyn ==
Novelist and businesswoman Amy Dillwyn called Olive Talbot her "wife" in private diaries, in 1872. The women can certainly be said to have shared a romantic friendship and exchanged gifts and shared trips. From the evidence of Dillwyn's diaries, the relationship remained "unrequited" by Talbot.
