= Ipswich and Suffolk Freehold Land Society =

Ipswich and Suffolk Freehold Land Society (FLS) was founded in 1849 as part of the "forty-shilling freeholders movement" which developed across England. Its aim was to enable "the ordinary man" to obtain sufficient property to meet the requirements needed to gain the vote. The movement had been started by James Taylor of Birmingham. On Saturday 1 December 1849 the first meeting of the society was advertised in the Suffolk Chronicle. Richard Dykes Alexander, the head of the Alexander banking family, was the first president.

== FLS activities in Ipswich ==
The society bought the 98 acre Cauldwell Hall estate which lay between Foxhall Road and Woodbridge Road. As they acquired land, they divided it into plots and laid out the roads in a regular street grid. The plots were then allotted to members of the Society members who could thus become freehold owners through payment of their subscriptions. Subsequently they would then need to pay for the construction of buildings on their land.

== FLS activities in Felixstowe ==
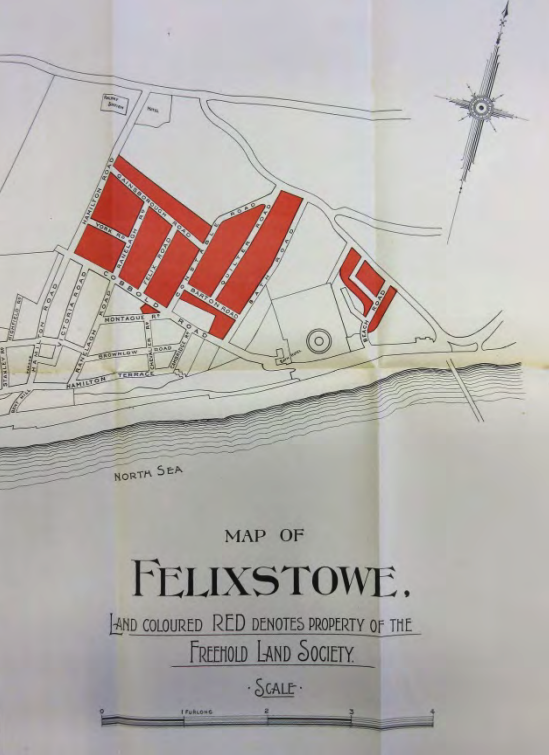
Map of FLS property in Felixstowe in 1899, as shown in the FLS's Jubilee brochure

The FLS bought its first site in Felixstowe in 1884.
