= Hendrefoilan =

Area of Swansea

Coordinates: 51.6223°N 4.00368°W

Hendrefoilan is an area in Swansea, South Wales. The area overlaps northwest Sketty and east Killay communities.

The western part is often known as 'Student Village', which lies on the west bank of the Olchfa Stream, in the suburb of Killay. It was part of a satellite campus of Swansea University and consisted of a number of flats which were let out to university students. However, in 2022 the site was sold, and as of 2024 is being developed as a modern housing estate.

== History ==
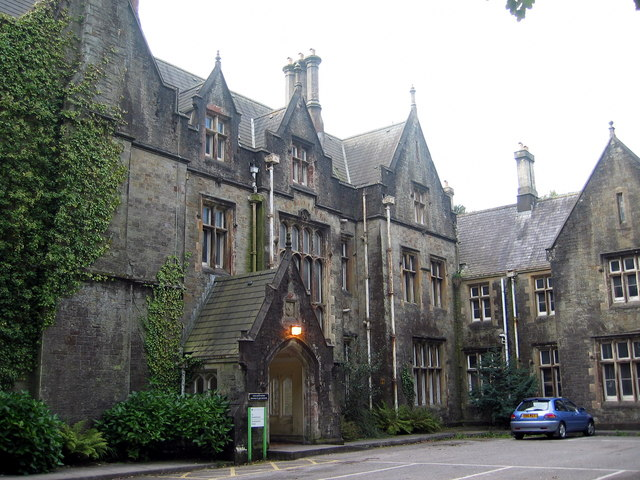
Hendrefoilan House

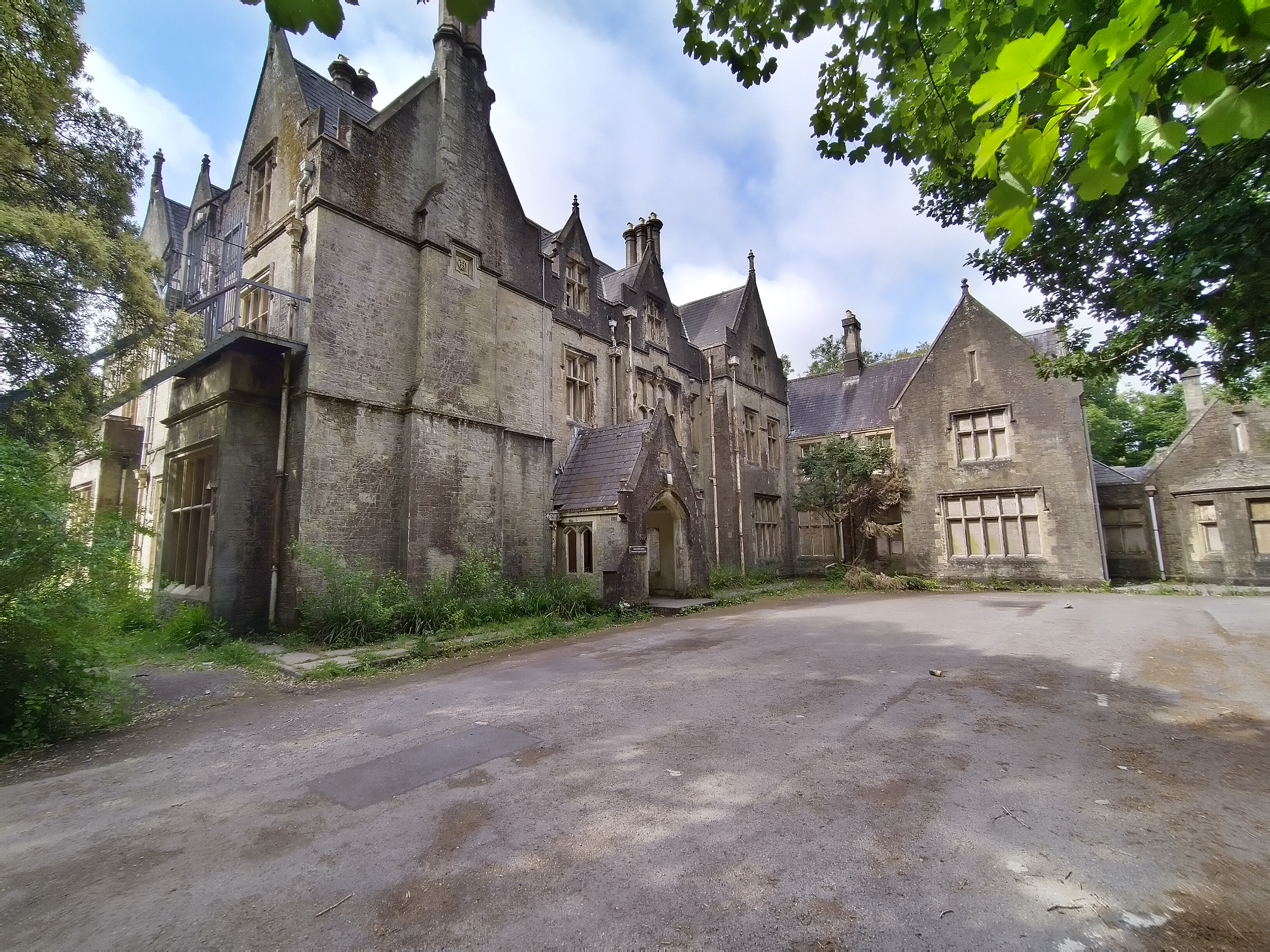
Hendrefoilan House (front of) photographed in 2020, derelict and boarded up

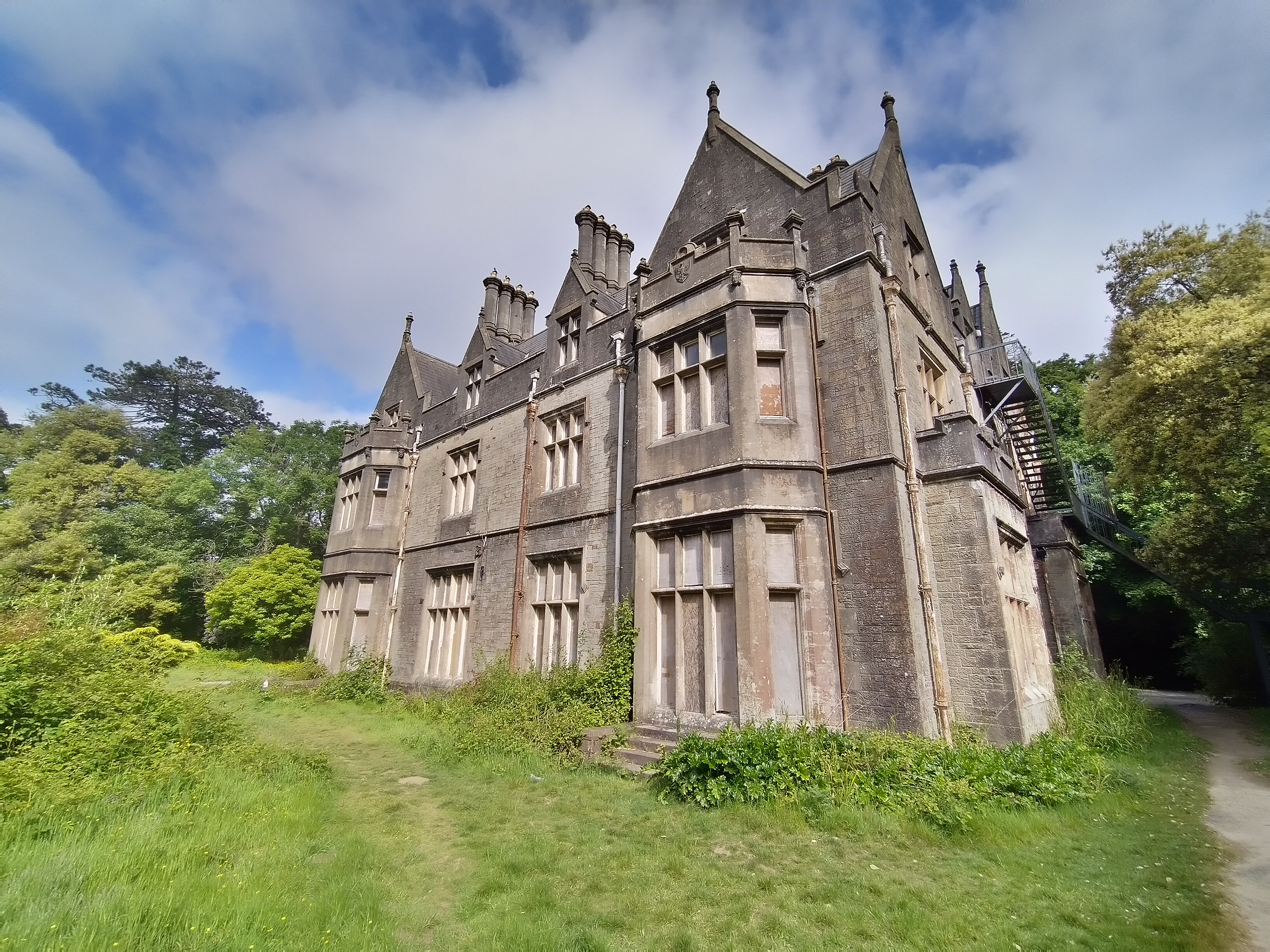
Hendrefoilan House (rear of) photographed in 2020, derelict and boarded up

The main feature on the campus is Hendrefoilan House, a large private house built in 1853 by William B. Colling for Lewis Llewelyn Dillwyn (1814–92) then the Member of Parliament for Swansea and home for many years to his daughter, the novelist and industrialist Amy Dillwyn. The house housed the South Wales Miners' Library from the 1980s until 2006, when it was moved to the Coach House, also on the campus. It also formerly housed the Adult Education Department of Swansea University, but has been boarded up and left derelict.

The building was sold to a private owner on 16 December 2020 for £350,000, but while the house was being renovated by the new owners, a large fire broke out on 27 March 2022, causing significant damage to the building. Aerial photographs on Google Maps, taken the following year, reveal extensive damage to the house, with most of the roof of the main house destroyed and damage to the upper floor.

The eastern part is sometimes known as the "Hendrefoilan Estate". It is within the community of Sketty, and part of the Tycoch electoral polling district, although it would not be considered "culturally" part of Tycoch. The area has an SA2 7** postcode, and is hence considered by Royal Mail to be within the Killay/Dunvant area. It is bounded by the Olchfa Stream to the west, the Gower Road to the south, and University Perimeter fence and Hendrefoilan Road to the north. The area consists of suburban housing.
