= William Cobb (photographer) =

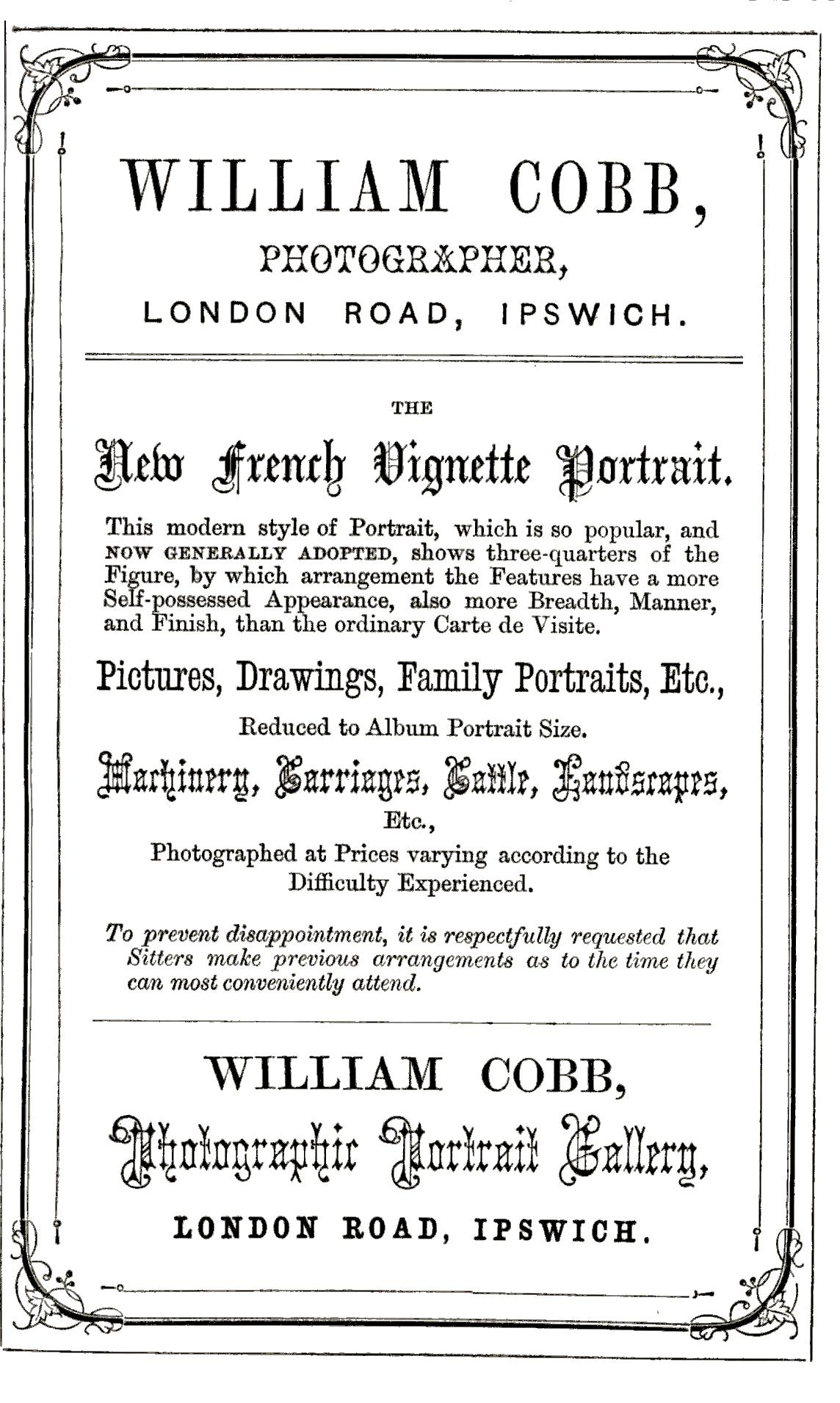
Advert in William Hunt's Descriptive Handbook of Ipswich, the River Orwell, Harwich, Dovercourt, & Felixstow: A guide-book for visitors (1864)

William Cobb was a pioneer of photography in Ipswich, Suffolk. He subsequently moved to Woolwich in southeast London where he continued to work.

He married Eliza Read on 26 June 1858 in the New Chapel, St Nicholas Street, Ipswich.

Cobb had his premises in 1 Clarkson Street, Ipswich and also supported Richard Dykes Alexander, an amateur photographer who lived nearby. Cobb left Ipswich in 1868, his departure marked by a valedictory note in the Ipswich Journal which remarked that he had made a significant contribution to the development of the photographic art in Ipswich.

After taking over the business of William Heathman, 77-78 Wellington Road, Woolwich in 1872, Cobb took photographs of members of the Royal Military Academy, Woolwich for use in Carte-de-visites. He used his photograph of Louis-Napoléon, Prince Imperial to promote his business.

He contributed several articles to the British Journal of Photography in 1880, including a paper he delivered to the South London Photographic Society (SLPS) on "Ballooning from a Photographic Point of View" in which he suggested that the SLPS obtain a balloon of its own.
