= Higham Lodge =

Coordinates: 51.5910°N 0.0399°W

Higham Lodge or Higham Hill Lodge was a building in Walthamstow built in the late 17th century. It was expanded by the William Dillwyn after he took over the building. Dillwyn married Susan Weston, who inherited nearby High Hill from her father Lewis Weston. The two estates were combined, and High Hill was demolished with Higham Lodge being retained as the family home.

The house was built by Anthony Bacon and designed by William Newton in 1768. In 1793–4 John Harman commissioned Humphry Repton to improve the property.

In 1902 the property was bought by Hugh Baird bought the building and built a factory in the grounds. His company Baird & Tatlock (London), occupied the building making scientific apparatus, laboratory benches, and fume cupboards. The site is currently occupied by a petrol station.
