= William Dillwyn Sims =

English industrialist and artist

William Dillwyn Sims (7 July 1825, in Westminster – 7 March 1895, in Ipswich) was an English industrialist and artist based in Ipswich. In 1851 he joined the company Ransomes and May, in which his uncle Charles May was a partner. Charles left in 1852 and the company became Ransomes and Sims. Sims remained involved in the company as it evolved into Ransomes, Sims & Jefferies.

== Early life ==
William was the son of Dr. John Sims (1792 - July 1838) and Lydia Dillwyn (1875 - 1830), who were Quakers in Westminster, London. His Aunt, Ann Dillwyn married Richard Dykes Alexander, another prominent Quaker in Ipswich. The couple looked after William following the death of his father when he was 13.

== Artistic activity ==
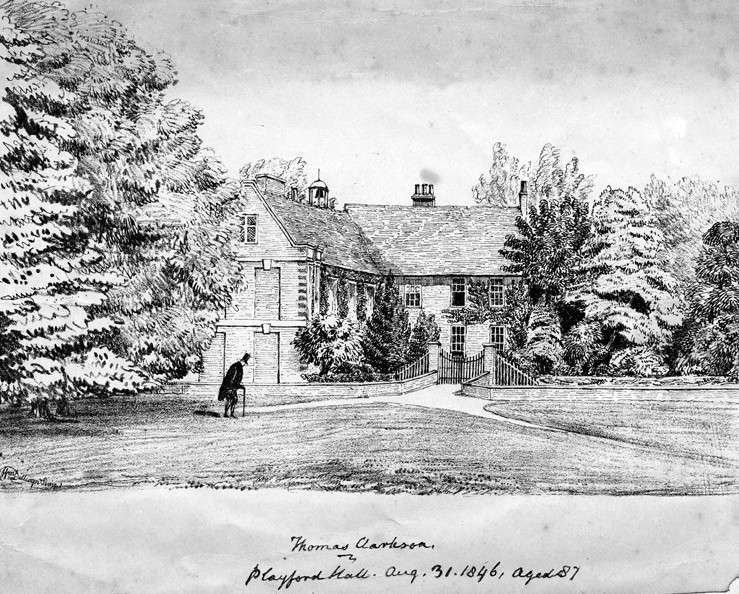
Thomas Clarkson by William Dillwyn Sims 1846

His sketch of Thomas Clarkson was reproduced using the Anastatic printing process. William supported the Needham Market Fine Arts and Industrial Exhibition of 1867. In 1884 he exhibited three watercolour paintings at the Ipswich Fine Art Club:"Matlock Bath Cottages, near Walker's Hotel", "Rievaulx Abbey, Yorkshire, by Moonlight" and "Rievaulx Abbey, Yorkshire".
