= Thereza Dillwyn Llewelyn =

British photographer (1834–1926)

Thereza Mary Dillwyn Llewelyn
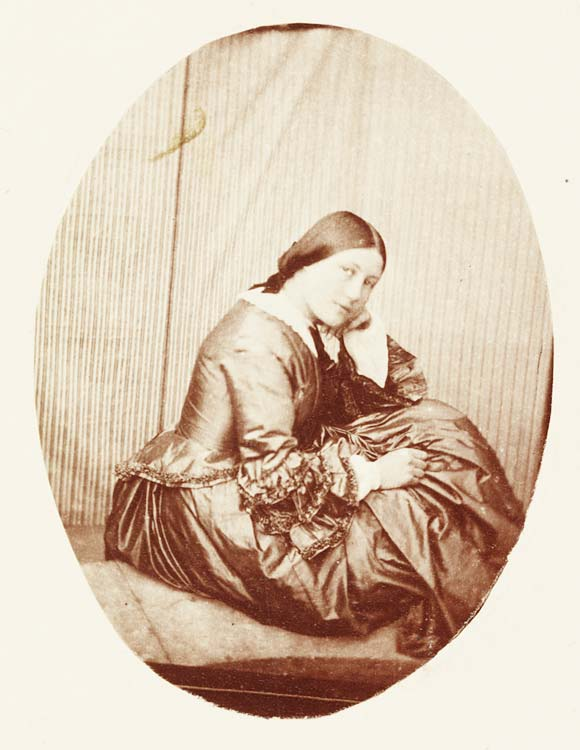
- Thereza Mary Dillwyn Llewelyn photographed by her father, John Dillwyn Llewelyn, in the 1850s.
- Born: Thereza Mary Dillwyn Llewelyn; 1834; Penllergaer, Wales
- Died: 21 February 1926 (aged 91–92); Basset Down House, Wroughton, Wiltshire, England
- Spouse: Nevil Story Maskelyne
- Children: Mary Story Maskelyne, Thereza Story Maskelyne
- Parent(s): John Dillwyn Llewelyn, Emma Thomasina Llewelyn (née Talbot)

Thereza Dillwyn Llewelyn (1834 – 21 February 1926) was a Welsh astronomer and pioneer in scientific photography.

== Biography ==
The eldest of six children, Llewelyn was born to photographer and botanist John Dillwyn Llewelyn and Emma Thomasina Talbot at Penllergare House in Glamorganshire. Along with her parents, her extended family were active in the fields of science in photography, including her mother's cousin the photographer Henry Fox Talbot and her aunt, Mary Dillwyn, one of earliest female photographers in Wales. Llewelyn developed an interest in photography and astronomy, although both were uncommon endeavours for women in the Victorian era. Her cousins were the sisters novelist and industrialist Amy Dillwyn and the lepidopterist Mary De la Beche Nicholl.

Llewelyn married Nevil Story-Maskelyne, a professor of mineralogy at Oxford University, on 29 June 1858. Through him, she began a correspondence with Charles Darwin. Together they had two daughters: Mary, who later married politician and writer H. O. Arnold-Forster, and Domestic science advocate Thereza who went on to marry physicist Arthur William Rucker.

== Scientific work and photography ==
Due to Llewelyn's interest in astronomy, her father constructed an equatorial observatory at Penllergare Valley Woods for her sixteenth birthday. The construction of the observatory was a family affair, as Llewelyn described the event in an 1851 letter to her father:

I laid the foundation stone of the observatory today, July 7th. When Grandpa and Grandmama were here on Saturday we told them about it and they were so very kind as to come over here today and to see the first stone laid; so we went in procession to the place; they had got some stone already and after I had laid the first stone [my younger sisters] Emma laid the second and Elinor the third, which she was very much delighted to do.

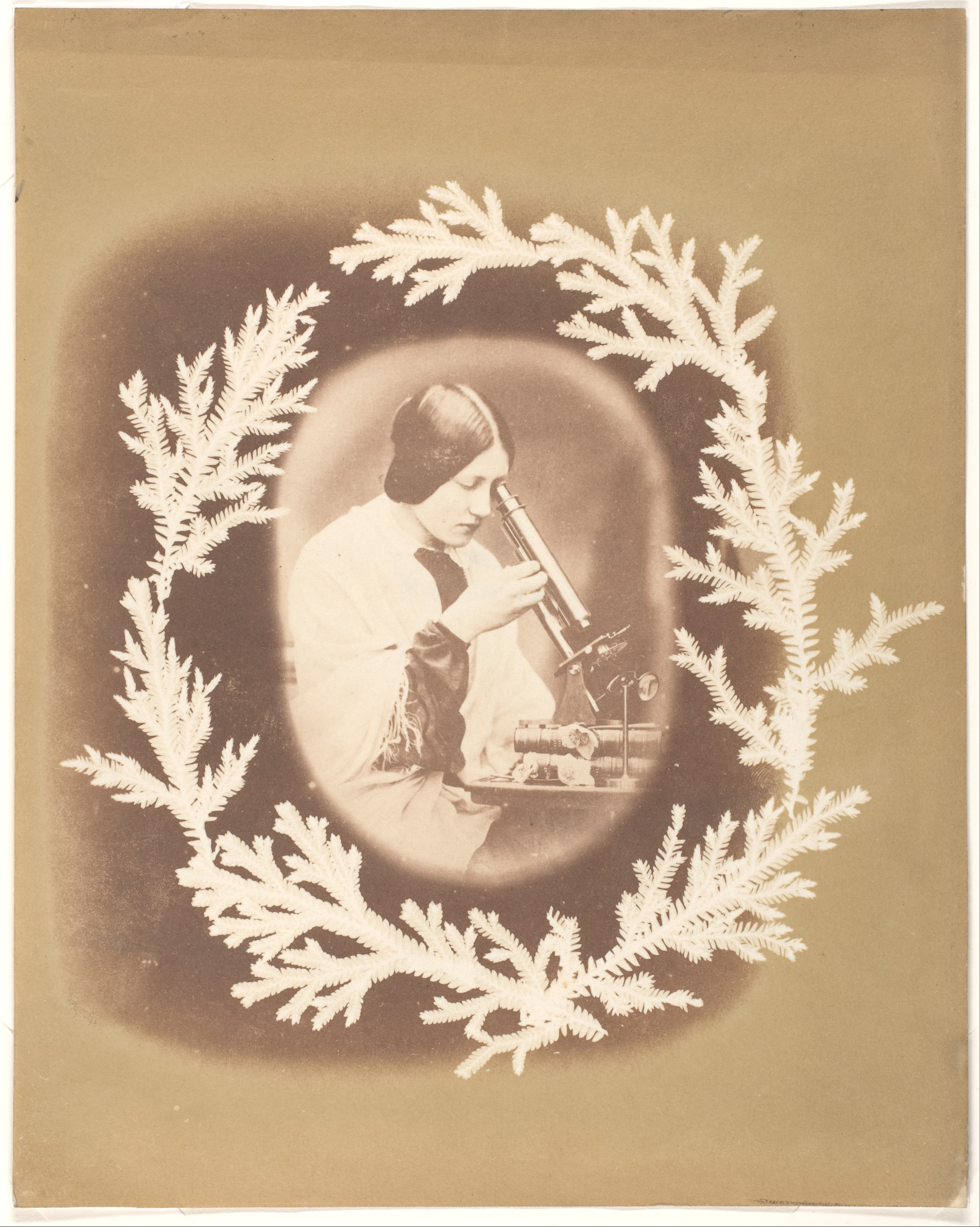
Thereza Dillwyn Llewelyn using a microscope, taken by her father, John Dillwyn Llewelyn.

Llewelyn collaborated with her father in a number of astrophotographic experiments, including the production of some of the earliest photographs of the moon in the mid-1850s. She later recalled how "as moonlight requires much longer exposure, it was my business to keep the telescope moving steadily as there was no clockwork action." They also developed a means to photograph snow crystals.

Collaboration between Llewelyn and her father also extended to meteorology, as they contributed to the maintenance and monitoring of the British Science Association's volunteer weather stations. Llewelyn managed the meteorological records and hoped to present her observations in person at a meeting of the Association. However, her father did not allow her to attend.

One of John Dillwyn Llewelyn's photographs of his daughter, taken around 1854, has a photogram of ferns as a vignette border rather than the lace, ink and watercolour, or papercut borders that were common at the time. Llewelyn adopted this decorative method for at least one of her photographs of her sister, Elinor.

In addition to photography, Llewelyn compiled a herbarium and wrote a report that was read at the Linnean Society in 1857.

Llewelyn may have observed Donati's Comet in 1858 before it was officially announced by the Italian astronomer.

Following her marriage to Maskelyne, the two collaborated on experiments in chemistry and photography.

In 1874, Llewelyn corresponded with Charles Darwin in the pages of Nature about her observations of birds biting flowers to eat nectar.

== Legacy and archives ==
In 2012, the British Library acquired the Dillwyn Llewelyn/Story Maskelyne photographic archive, which includes a selection of Thereza's journals, memoirs, and photographs.

== See also ==
- Timeline of women in science
