= Penllergare =

Estate in Swansea, Wales, UK

Coordinates: 51.670°N 4.009°W

Penllergare is a country park in Wales. It was the estate of John Dillwyn Llewelyn adjacent to what is now the village of Penllergaer, Swansea. Although the names are similar, the village of Penllergaer grew up as a separate entity from the Penllergare estate. The park is listed on the Cadw/ICOMOS Register of Parks and Gardens of Special Historic Interest in Wales.

== History ==
At the height of its prosperity in the nineteenth and early twentieth centuries, the Penllergare estate, on the north-west fringe of Swansea, was one of the great gardens of Britain. Its main creator was John Dillwyn Llewelyn (1810–82), a man as distinguished for his contribution to landscape design and horticulture, as for his scientific experiments and pioneering photography.

Penllergare provided inspiration for the expression of Dillwyn-Llewellyn's talents. Taking in the adjacent estate of Nydfwch and based on the work of his father, Lewis Weston Dillwyn, John exploited the natural beauty of the site in his grand design to create a landscape planted with a rich variety of trees, shrubs and exotic plants. He erected one of the first purpose-built orchid houses in the kitchen gardens, from 1836, an observatory, around 1851-2, was built close to the mansion house, and experiments with an electrically powered boat (built before 1848 by John himself) were conducted on the Lower Lake.

Inspired by Henry Fox Talbot who was first cousin to John's wife, Emma, Llewelyn became an enthusiastic and accomplished photographer. With its lakes and waterfalls, panoramic vistas, secret places and horticultural and botanical riches, Penllergare provided a wide variety of subjects for his camera and his photographic images vividly evoke the Victorian era style. His son, Sir John Talbot Dillwyn Llewelyn, brought the gardens to their peak just before the Great War and he, like his father was a notable philanthropist and supporter of community activities.

During the second half of the twentieth century, however, those glories faded and Penllergare began its long slide into dereliction. The mansion was destroyed and replaced by a ‘civic centre’. Development and vandalism added to the effects of neglect. The woodland gardens were "top-sliced" by the M4 motorway. Modern houses abut on the walled gardens and spill into the park. The promised country park in the 1990s failed to materialise, and the derelict house was demolished for safety reasons in the 1960s.

Cadw describes Penllergare as, "the partial survivor of a very important picturesque and Romantic landscape of the mid-nineteenth century" and registers it at Grade II on its Cadw/ICOMOS Register of Parks and Gardens of Special Historic Interest in Wales.

== The Penllergare Trust ==
The Penllergare Trust (Ymddiriedolaeth Penllergare) was formed in 2000 as a not-for-profit company and registered charity. Its objects are, for the benefit of the public, at Penllergare and its setting in Swansea, to further:- (a) the protection, conservation, restoration and maintenance of the cultural landscape of Penllergare. (b) knowledge and appreciation of Penllergare. (c) the protection and conservation of wildlife.

== Penllergare today ==
Penllergare (or more commonly known as Penllergare Valley Woods) is a nationally important historical landscape. It is a sanctuary for wildlife, and it has more recently become a park for people in an increasingly urban area providing a range of recreation and leisure opportunities. The leases of Valley Woods were assigned to the Trust on 26 April 2012, effectively securing them for public benefit until 2116. This in turn initiated the award of £2.4m by the Heritage Lottery Fund through its Parks for People programme to support the first phase of an £2.9m restoration scheme focussed on the upper end of the valley.

Guided by the archive of John Dillwyn Llewelyn’s mid-nineteenth century photography, over the next 3 years, the upper lake will be de-silted, and steps, terraces, waterfalls and cascades will be repaired and restored to reinstate the picturesque and romantic design. The stone arched Llewelyn Bridge has been built in 2013, perhaps the only bridge of its type to be built in Britain in decades. The observatory has been leased from the Council, repaired and brought back into use and a hydro-electric generator will be installed alongside the upper waterfall to provide sustainable power for the estate. A walkway under the M4 will also link with the Forestry Commission forest, more than doubling the size of Valley Woods, as well as providing a ‘green’ route from the Gower to the Brecon Beacons. The construction of a small visitor kiosk and woodland car park has started and is due to be completed in June 2013. This work is supported by a grant from the European Regional Development Convergence Fund through Visit Wales and the Welsh Government as Valley Woods is part of the ‘One Historic Garden Project’ linking heritage, gardens and opportunities across South Wales.
