= Lewis Llewelyn Dillwyn =

Welsh industrialist and politician

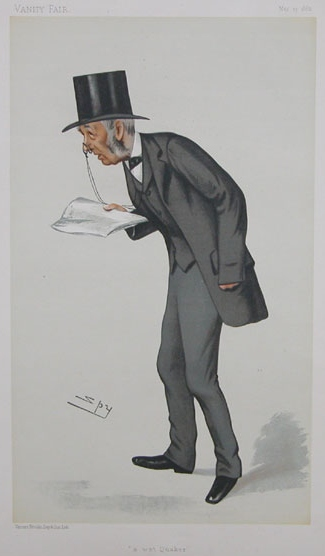
- Caricature of Dillwyn by Spy in Vanity Fair, May 1882

Member of Parliament for Swansea District
- In office 1855-1885; 1885-1892

Personal details
- Born: 19 May 1814 Swansea, Wales
- Died: 19 June 1892 (aged 78) Swansea, Wales
- Party: Liberal
- Spouse: Elizabeth de la Beche (m. 1838)
- Children: 4, including Amy and Mary
- Parent: Lewis Weston Dillwyn (father)
- Relatives: John Dillwyn Llewelyn (brother); Mary Dillwyn (sister); Thereza Dillwyn Llewelyn (niece); J.T.D. Llewellyn (nephew)
- Military career
- Rank: Colonel
- Commands: 3rd (Swansea Rifles) Glamorganshire Rifle Volunteers

Lewis Llewelyn Dillwyn (19 May 1814 – 19 June 1892) was a Welsh industrialist and Liberal politician who served as MP for Swansea for 37 years.

== Early life ==
Dillwyn was born in Swansea, Wales, the fourth of six children of Lewis Weston Dillwyn and Mary (née Adams) Dillwyn. He had two brothers and three sisters. His grandfather, William Dillwyn, was an American Quaker, who, alongside others such as William Wilberforce had campaigned for the abolition of the slave trade. His father had been sent to Swansea by his father William, to take over the management of the Cambrian Pottery, and lived at Sketty Hall. He was educated at Kilvert's Academy in Bath but, following his father's election to Parliament as one of the two members for Glamorgan in 1832 he and chose to follow a business career by taking over the management of Cambrian Pottery, rather than enter Oriel College, Oxford as had been intended. His father was a friend of the geologist Henry De la Beche and Dillwyn and De la Beche carried out experiments on china clays and granites with the aim of improving the production of earthenware. On 16 March 1838, Dillwyn married de la Beche's daughter Elizabeth and, with his wife's artistic guidance, the pottery produced a range of beautiful Etruscan ware which is today a collector's item. They had four children, the best known of whom was Amy Dillwyn, and lived at the newly built Hendrefoilan House in Sketty.

== Industrial activities ==
Dillwyn followed his father and his Quaker antecedents in pursuing industry and commerce and radical politics, and played a major part in the industrial development of Swansea. He was head of the firm of Dillwyn and Richards at the Landore spelter works and began to expand his industrial activities to include silver refining. Later, he formed a partnership with William Siemens to establish the Landore Siemens Steel Co., and by 1874 this company had become one of the four largest producers in the world, employing some 2000 workers. In the 1880s, following a slump in the steel industry, Dillwyn concentrated his manufacturing activities on his spelter works at Llansamlet (equally in the built-up area of Swansea), and soon became one of the major zinc producers in the country. Dillwyn was also for many years an active director of the Great Western Railway and Chairman of the Glamorganshire Banking Co.

== Military connections ==
In 1859 he raised the 3rd (Swansea Rifles) Glamorganshire Rifle Volunteers and was commissioned as their Captain. The Swansea Rifles grew to become a full battalion. Dillwyn continued to command the unit (which was often known as 'Dillwyn's') for many years, rising to Lieutenant-Colonel Commandant in 1877 and full Colonel in 1888. In 1881, while inspecting the troops after they had completed a week's training he fell from his horse and sustained serious injuries from which he did, however, recover.

== Political career ==
In 1837, at the early age of 22, Dillwyn became a Glamorganshire magistrate and in 1843 played a prominent role alongside his brother, John Dillwyn Llewelyn (who had taken his mother's maiden name after inheriting the Penllegare estate) in preventing the Rebecca riots from engulfing Glamorgan as they had neighbouring Carmarthenshire. During the 1840s he became a member of the Swansea Town Council and the Swansea Harbour trust. In 1848 was Mayor of Swansea, during which year the British Association held its annual meeting in the town. Dillwyn promoted the new piped supply of pure water to the town, agreed to the mass naming and renaming of streets and their improvement through the introduction of paving. In 1852 he conversed with Edwin Chadwick as to building a modern sewerage system in Swansea.

In 1855 he was elected Member of Parliament for Swansea District, succeeding J.H. Vivian who had held the seat since 1832. He held the seat and its central successor for 37 years and in all but the last years with few challenges (e.g. opposed in 1874 by Charles Bath of Ffynone, comfortably defeated). In Parliament, Dillwyn had built a reputation by the 1860s as an advanced radical and, at least until the election of men such as Henry Richard, he was regarded as the leader of the Welsh Liberal Party from his regular corner seat below the gangway. Not an effective orator – one obituary even alluded to his 'remarkable inability to make a coherent speech'. – he took praise as a critic of privileges of his own church. It was significant he was an Anglican and this made his support for the campaigns of the Liberation Society against the status of that Established church more effective. He introduced bills in 1860 and 1863 to enable dissenters to be elected as trustees of endowed schools and his motion on the Church of Ireland (28 March 1865) influenced Gladstone's gradual move towards disestablishment. From 1870 he first supported the disestablishment of the Welsh Church (Anglican Church in Wales), in 1873 moved an anti-clerical amendment to the Endowed Schools Act and from 1883 he annually moved for such disestablishment. He favoured Local Option to enable Councils to close of all public houses within a given area.

During this period Dillwyn came to be regarded as a conspicuous Radical and was an active supporter of the Reform Act 1867. During the passage of the Second Reform Bill Dillwyn's involvement as a leading member of the 'Tea Room' cabal of disaffected Liberals in April 1867 helped to bring about household suffrage, a measure which led to an overnight increase in the urban electorate throughout Great Britain. At the 1865 General Election he was instrumental in promoting the candidature in Cardiganshire of Evan Matthew Richards, a fellow Swansea industrialist. This election was notable for the allegations of clerical influence and intimidation. In Parliament, Dillwyn championed the cause of Cardiganshire farmers who were evicted for their votes in 1868 election. Similarly, in the 1880s, he supported the Denbighshire tenantry who agitated against tithes. In 1887 he and Stuart Rendel affirmed the Welsh Liberal Party's support of Irish Home Rule.

After the Redistribution of Seats Act 1885, the third Reform Act, Dillwyn became MP for the new seat Swansea Town from 1885 to 1892. Dillwyn was opposed in 1885 by little known 22-year-old Tory, W.H. Meredyth who belonged to a leading Anglo-Irish family and drew much of his support during the campaign from aristocrats who came to Swansea to support him. Dillwyn's slashed majority demonstrated that the now marginal political status locally, heightened by the Swansea Town seat excluding most of the overwhelmingly working-class suburbs and contributory boroughs.

General election 1885: Swansea Town Electorate
Party	Candidate	Votes	%	±%
Liberal	Lewis Llewelyn Dillwyn	3,660		
Conservative	W.H. Meredyth	2,520		–
Majority		1,140		
Turnout			81.3	
Liberal win (new seat)				

In 1886, he increased his majority.

General election 1886: Swansea Town Electorate
Party	Candidate	Votes	%	±%
Liberal	Lewis Llewelyn Dillwyn	3,040		
Conservative	A.J. Lambert	1,740		–
Majority		1,300		
Turnout				
Liberal hold		Swing		

== Scientific interests ==
Dillwyn was a prominent member of the Aborigines' Protection Society, a Fellow of the Linnean Society and a Fellow of the Geological Society and delivered talks on ornithology and natural history to the Royal Institution of South Wales. One of the lectures was about Labuan, a tiny British colony next to Borneo. Dillwyn, together with James Motley, a fellow member of the RISW, published an illustrated volume, intended as first of a series, on the natural history of Labuan. Within the field of ornithology Dillwyn also named the bird species Megapodius cumingii (Philippine megapode) and Copsychus stricklandii (White-crowned shama). He was also a photographer, his brother John Dillwyn Llewelyn being a pioneer photographer and botanist.

== Death and legacy ==
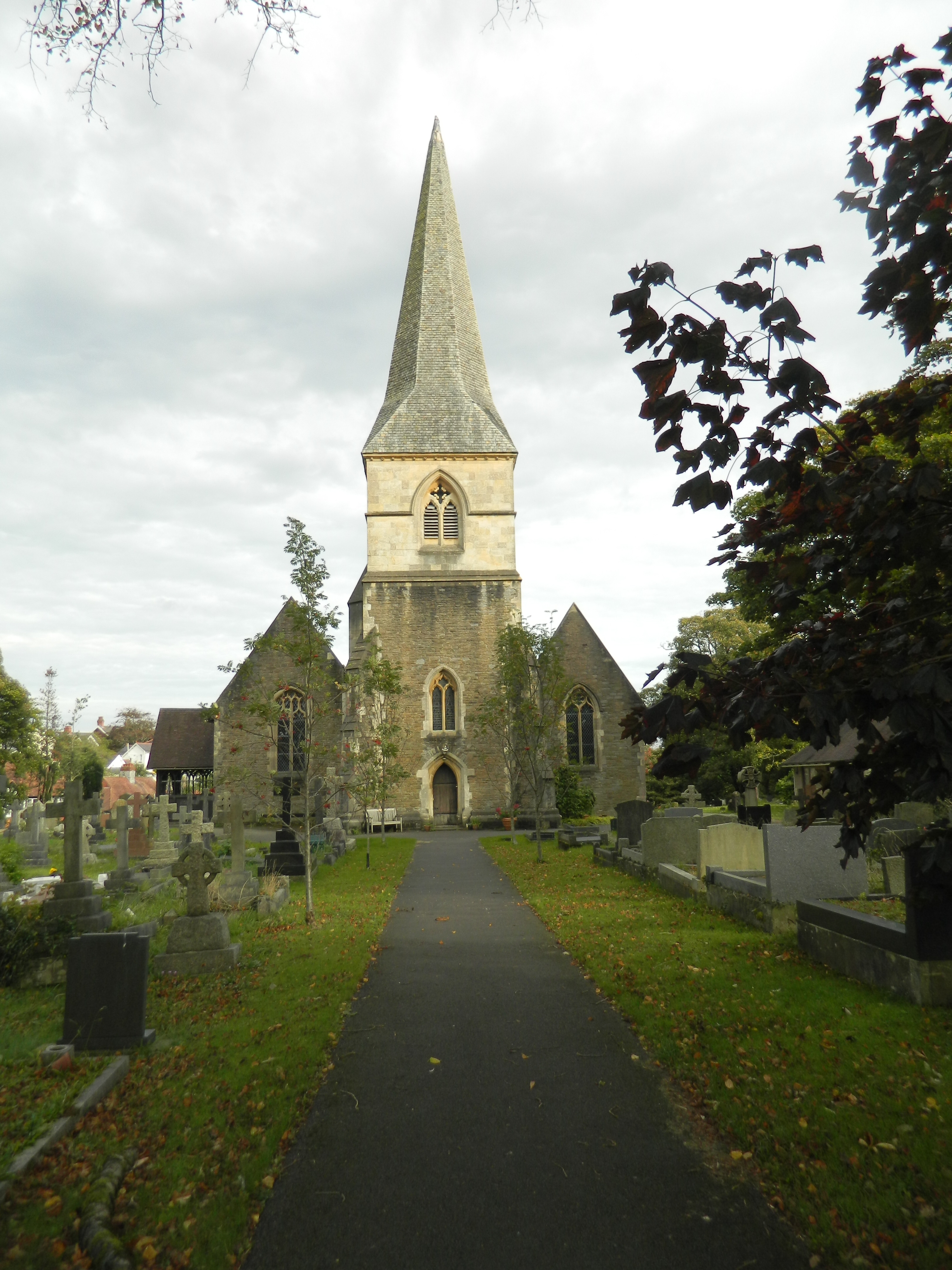
St Paul's Churchyard near his eponymous road in Sketty, which covers the immediate west of Swansea

Dillwyn, aged 78, had every intention of contesting the 1892 Election despite an active opposition. On 1 June a general meeting of the Swansea Conservatives and Liberal Unionists, allied against the Irish Home Rule movement, resolved to nominate F. Ormesby-Gore.

On 18 June he attended a meeting at Swansea Liberal Club where David Randell was re-adopted as candidate for the Gower constituency and gave speech. Later that evening he attended a meeting to plan his own campaign where he lost and regained consciousness. He died the following day at the Royal Hotel, Swansea.

His funeral and burial at St Paul's churchyard, Sketty, was largely private, at the request of his family. His demise provoked "a great deal of comment" in radical circles. His only son, Harry, a hard-drinking barrister, and one daughter had predeceased him, but he left two daughters: the eldest, Mary, the alpinist and entomologist (Mary De la Beche Nicholl), and the novelist Elizabeth Amy Dillwyn. The Hendrefoilan estate, Merthyr Mawr near Bridgend, passed to Dillwyn's grandson John Nicholl, Mary's son. Mary who was widowed two years later, continued her father's interest in natural history, and in later years took up residence at "the Cottage" on the estate.

In the year of Dillwyn's death, his nephew, Sir John T. D. Llewelyn was chosen by local Conservatives. Narrowly defeated by the Liberal, R.D. Burnie, he won in 1895. Dillwyn's Liberal Party resurged from 1900 in a strong period for them in the region bucking the national outcome.

== See also ==
- History of Swansea
- Welsh Liberal Party
- Temperance movement in the United Kingdom
- Disestablishmentarianism
- Irish Home Rule movement

== Bibliography ==
- Morgan, Kenneth O. (1960). "Democratic Politics in Glamorgan, 1884–1914". Morgannwg. 4: 5–27.
- Rees, Ivor Thomas (Autumn 2004). "Whatever happened to young William?". Gwent Local History. 97: 58–66.

Parliament of the United Kingdom
Preceded by John Henry Vivian	Member of Parliament for Swansea District; 1855 – 1885	Succeeded by Henry Vivian
New constituency	Member of Parliament for Swansea; 1885 – 1892	Succeeded by Robert John Dickson Burnie
