= Lewis Weston Dillwyn =

British politician and naturalist (1778–1855)

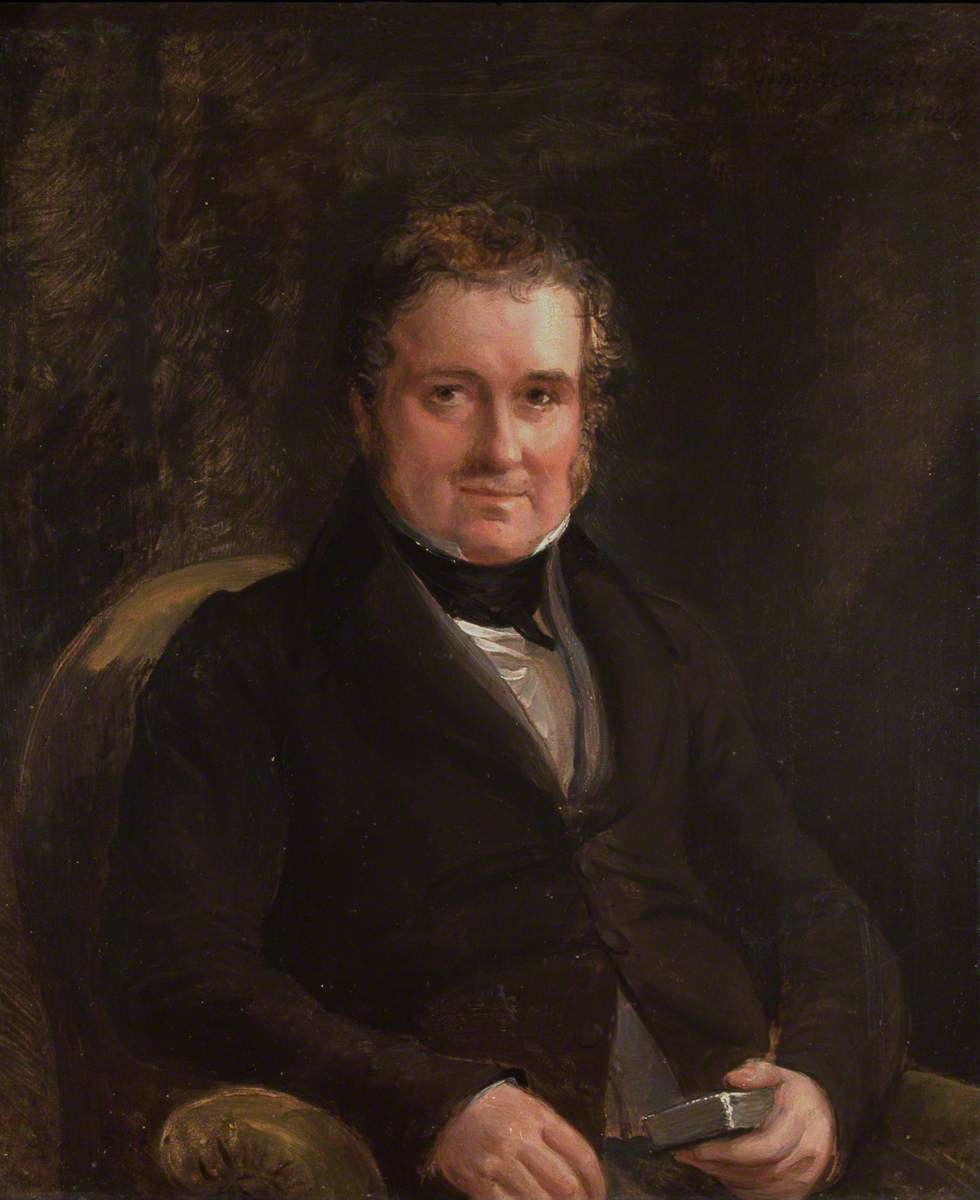
- Born: 21 August 1778; Walthamstow, Essex, England
- Died: 31 August 1855 (aged 77); Sketty Hall, near Swansea, Wales
- Known for: The British Confervae
- Spouse: Mary Adams
- Children: Six, including John Dillwyn Llewelyn, Lewis Llewelyn Dillwyn, Mary Dillwyn, Suzanna
- Parents: William Dillwyn (father); Sarah Dillwyn (née Weston) (mother)
- Scientific career
- Fields: Porcelain manufacturer, naturalist, Member of Parliament
- Author abbrev. (botany): Dillwyn

Lewis Weston Dillwyn, FRS (21 August 1778 – 31 August 1855) was a British porcelain manufacturer, naturalist and Whig Member of Parliament (MP).

== Biography ==
He was born in Walthamstow, Essex, the eldest son of William Dillwyn and Sarah Dillwyn (née Weston). His father, a Pennsylvanian Quaker had returned to Britain in 1777 during Philadelphia's worst period in the American War of Independence and settled at Higham Lodge, Walthamstow, Essex, UK. William Dillwyn was a vociferous anti-slavery campaigner and toured England and South Wales in his work for the Anti-Slavery Committee. William Dillwyn was related to George Haynes through the Emlen and Physick families in Philadelphia and it is likely that the opportunity to buy the Cambrian Pottery in Swansea, Wales, from Haynes came about through these family connections in America.

William's letters to his daughter Suzanna are held by the Library Company of Philadelphia and stored at the Historical Society of Pennsylvania. These letters show that the factory was bought by William to keep Lewis active while the latter was suffering from gout. The highlight of this period of production of Swansea Pottery was the opening by Lewis Weston Dillwyn and George Haynes of the Cambrian Company, the Swansea Potteries London Warehouse on Fleet Street which operated between 1806 and 1807. In 1814 the pottery took over the workforce of the Nantgarw Pottery and began to make porcelain.

Lewis Weston Dillwyn however was also renowned for his published works on botany and conchology, including his 1809 work The British Confervae, an illustrated study of British freshwater algae, and The Botanist's Guide through England and Wales (1805), which he compiled with Dawson Turner. Dillwyn also edited an exsiccata-like series distributing herbarium specimens under the title British Confervae. Dillwyn is credited with discovering several species of the Conferva genus. Among the botanical illustrators of The British Confervae are the artists William Jackson Hooker, Ellen Hutchins and William Weston Young. He was elected in 1804 as a Fellow of the Royal Society.

His expertise was valued by several of his neighbours who also had an interest in natural history, most notably the Talbot family at Penrice, including their cousin, the young Henry Fox Talbot. He often accompanied them on walks on the sea shore, corresponded, and shared advice and specimens.

In 1817 he temporarily retired from the pottery. In 1818 he became High Sheriff of Glamorgan and was elected to the First Reformed Parliament in 1834 as MP for Glamorganshire. He bought Sketty Hall near Swansea and was elected Mayor of Swansea in 1839. Dillwyn was also one of the founders of the Royal Institution of South Wales and its first President, and in 1840 he published a short history of Swansea.

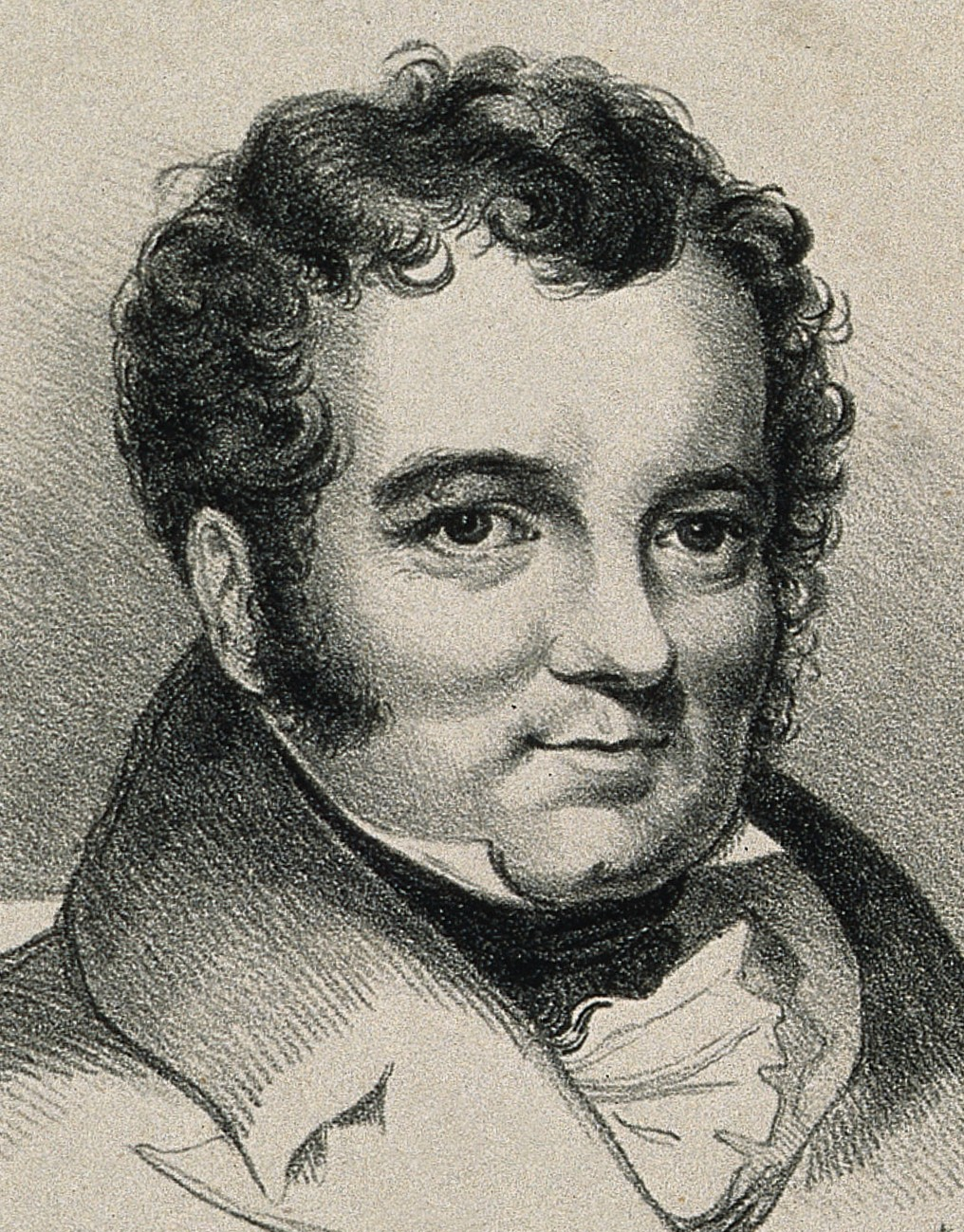
1833 lithograph portrait by Eden Upton Eddis

He married Mary Adams, the daughter of Colonel John Llewelyn of Penllergaer, Llangyfelach in 1807. They had six children, including the noted photographer John Dillwyn Llewelyn (1810–1882), MP for Swansea Lewis Llewelyn Dillwyn (1814-1892) and pioneering female photographer Mary Dillwyn. His granddaughters by his son Lewis were the novelist and industrialist Amy Dillwyn, and lepidopterist Mary De la Beche Nicholl. His granddaughter by John was the Welsh astronomer and pioneer in scientific photography Thereza Dillwyn Llewelyn.

He died in Sketty Hall, Swansea, in 1855.

.

== Honours ==
He is honoured in the names of several species including, Dillwynella which is a genus of sea snails, marine gastropod mollusks in the family Skeneidae named by Dall in 1889. Dillwynia, which is a genus of about 20 species of flowering plants in the family Fabaceae, and is endemic to Australia, named by Sm. in 1805.

== Arms ==
Coat of arms of Lewis Weston Dillwyn
Crest A stag's head couped Proper. Escutcheon Gules, on a chevron Argent three cinquefoils slipped of the First. Motto Craignez Honte (Fear shame)

== Taxa ==
Taxa named by Dillwyn include:

- Lithopoma gibberosa, a species of sea snail

== See also ==
- Dillwyn v Llewelyn, a legal case between his sons concerning his estate

Parliament of the United Kingdom
Preceded by Sir Christopher Cole	Member of Parliament for Glamorganshire; 1832–1837	Succeeded by Edwin Wyndham-Quin
