= Mary Dillwyn =

British photographer (1816–1906)

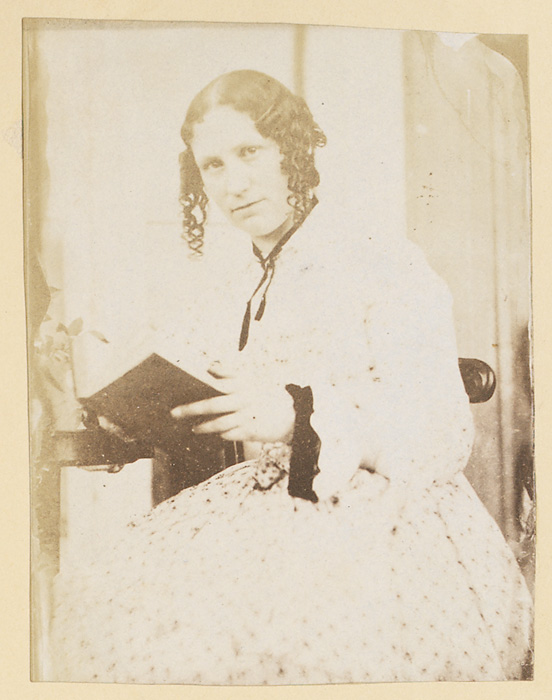
- Mary Dillwyn, self-portrait (c. 1853)
- Born: 1816; Wales
- Died: December 1906 (aged 89 or 90); Arthog, Meirionnydd, Wales
- Occupations: photographer and wife
- Known for: pioneering photography
- Spouse: Reverend Montague Earle Welby
- Parent(s): Lewis Weston Dillwyn; Mary Adams ^{(cy)}

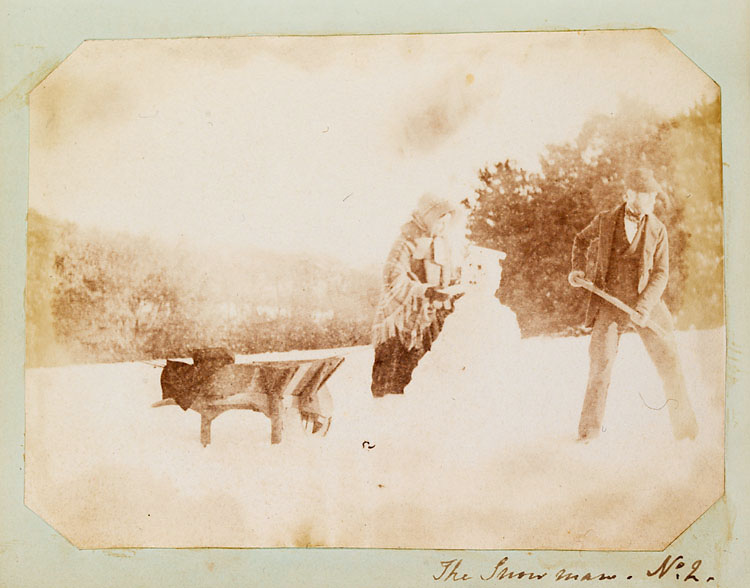
The Snowman No. 2

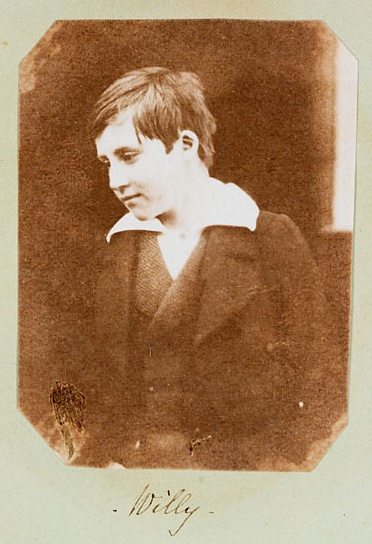
'Willy' smiling, 1853

Mary Dillwyn (1816 – December 1906) is considered to be the earliest female photographer in Wales, who took photographs of flowers, birds, animals, family and friends in the 1840s and 1850s. She provided a raw insight to the domestic lives of women and children living in 19th century Britain, pushing the boundaries of what could be considered as worthy subjects to photograph.

== Biography ==
Mary Dillwyn was the daughter of Lewis Weston Dillwyn (1778–1855) and Mary Adams (1776–1865), the natural daughter of Colonel John Llewelyn of Penllergaer and Ynysygerwn. She was one of four children, the younger sister of photographer John Dillwyn Llewelyn (1810–1882), who developed new photographic techniques, and Lewis Llewelyn Dillwyn, father of the novelist and industrialist Amy Dillwyn and the lepidopterist Mary De la Beche "Minnie" Nicholl. The Dillwyn Llewelyn family was also related to William Henry Fox Talbot, who claimed to discover photography in 1839, through the marriage of Emma Thomasina Talbot to John Dillwyn Llewelyn.

Dillwyn was ahead of her time for her interest in the new revolutionary technology. Most of the photographs taken by Dillwyn are small calotypes from the 1840s and 1850s, making her the first female photographer in Wales. Unlike her male counterparts, Dillwyn preferred a small camera which, as it only needed short exposure times, provided her with the opportunity to take more spontaneous photographs that captured the intimate moments of her family and friends in Victorian life. Because of this, her work appeared as more natural than those of other photographers of the period.

Her interest in photography appears to have ended in 1857 when she married Reverend Montague Earle Welby.

Mary Dillwyn died at Arthog, Meirionnydd in December 1906.

== Photographs ==
Photographs taken by Dillwyn have been preserved in albums acquired by the National Library of Wales. An album containing 42 salt prints and one albumen print, measuring 11.1 cm × 8.8 cm (4 1/4 in × 3 1/2 in), was bought by the library in 2002. It contains views of the Dillwyn Llewelyn home at Penllergare, portraits of family and friends and studies of flowers and birds.

One of her images is the first photograph of a smile. She managed to capture the fleeting expression of her young nephew, William Mansel Llewelyn, known as ‘Willy’ (d.1866) as he gazed intently at something off camera. The photograph is typical of Dillwyn's informal approach.

A second album, the Llysdinam Album (c. 1853), measuring 12 cm × 9.7 cm (4 3/4 in × 3 3/4 in), contains 72 salt prints from the calotype process. The images are of flowers, dolls, pet animals as well as family and friends. It was acquired by the National Library of Wales in 2007.

She is also credited with taking the first known photograph of a snowman, circa 1853.

== Legacy ==
There is a pub named Mary Dillwyn after her in Swansea, West Wales.

== Gallery ==
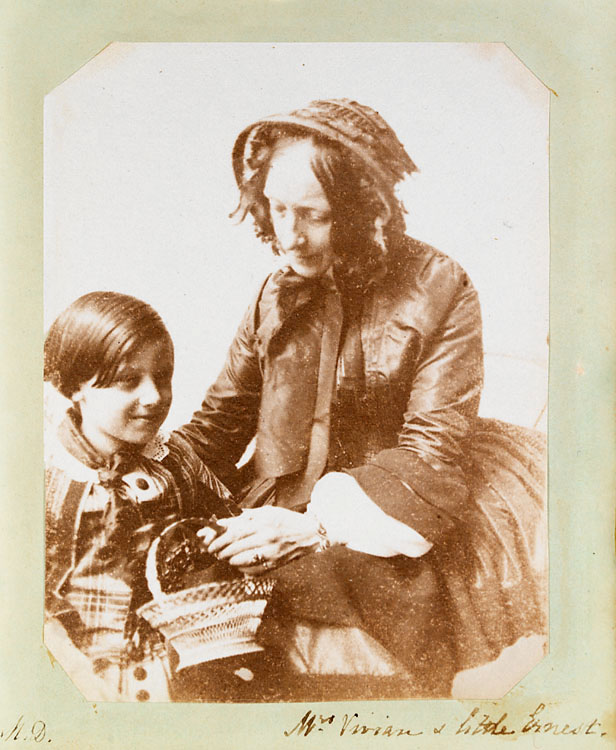

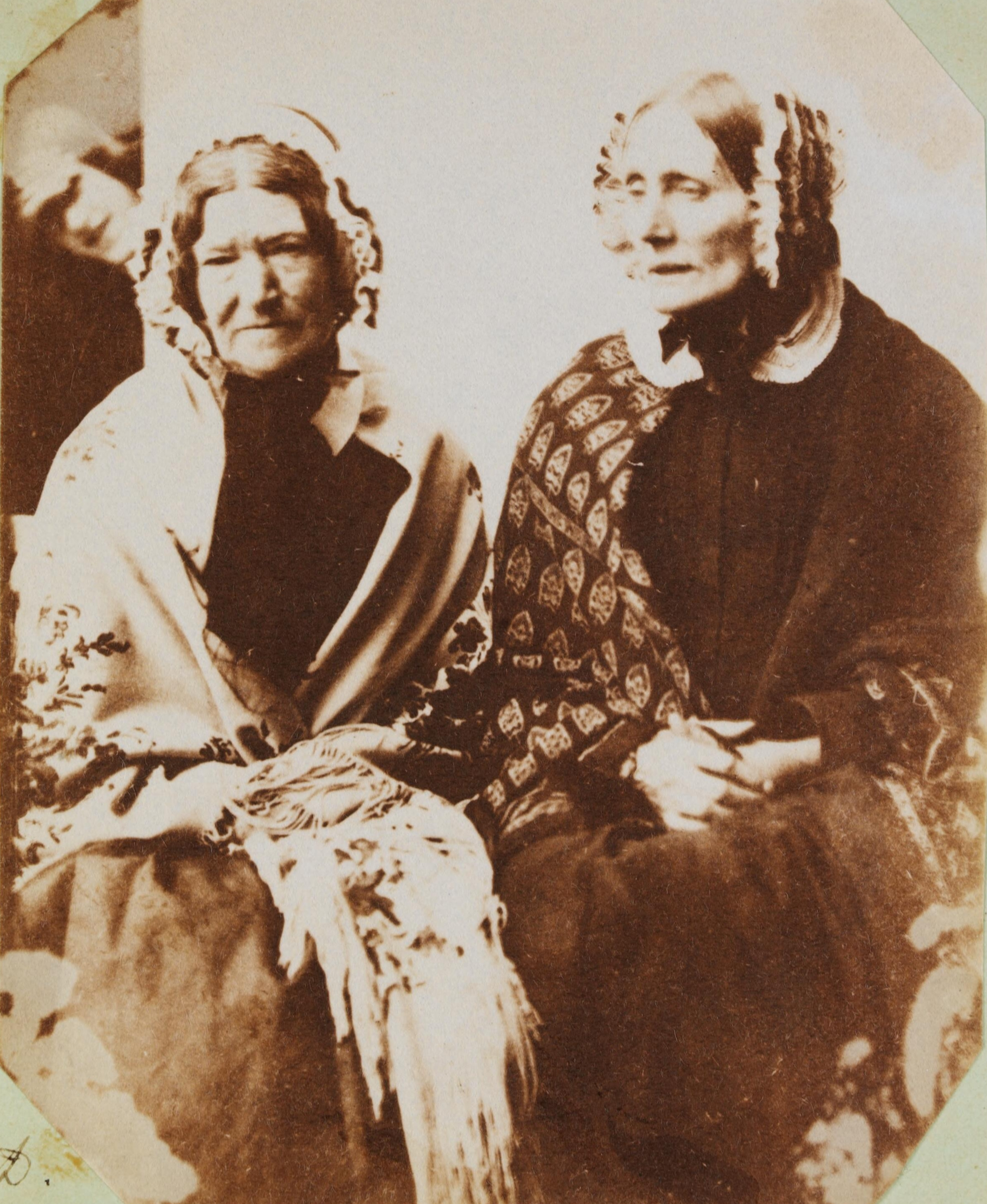

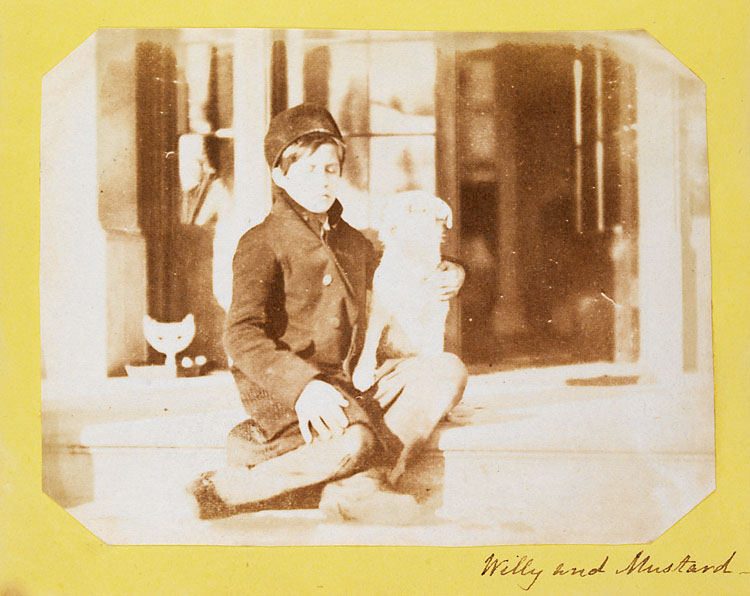

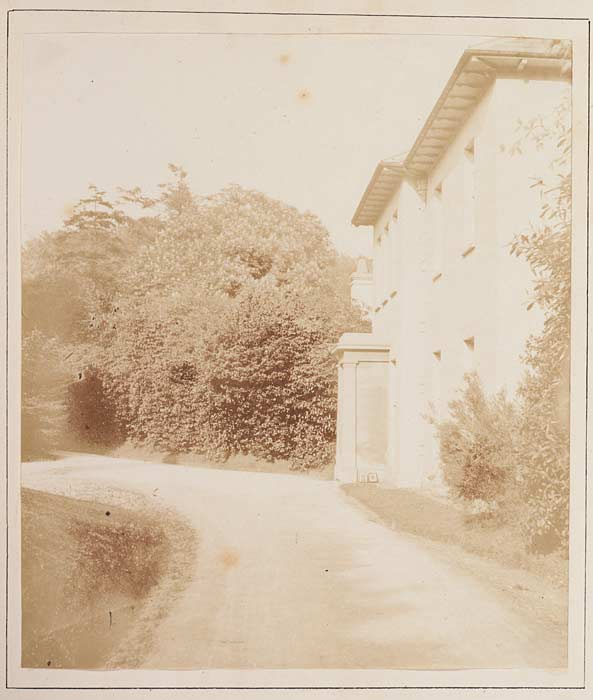

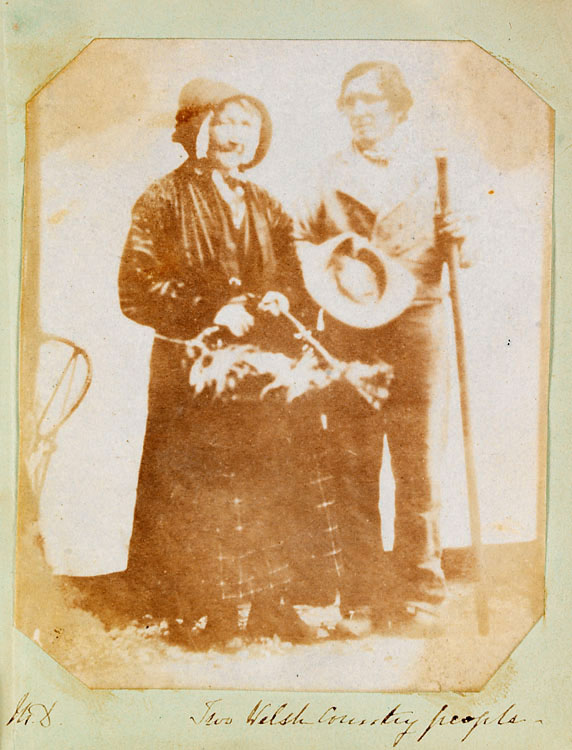

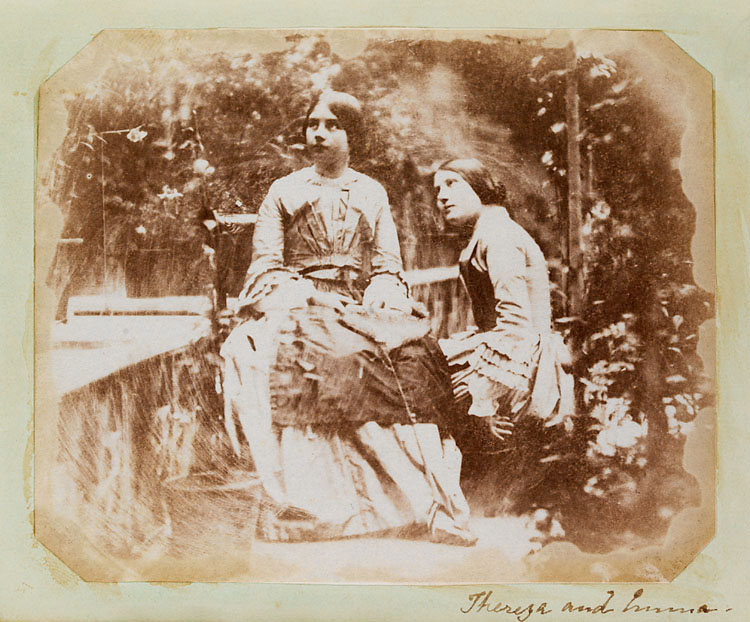
