= John Dillwyn Llewelyn =

Welsh botanist and photographer

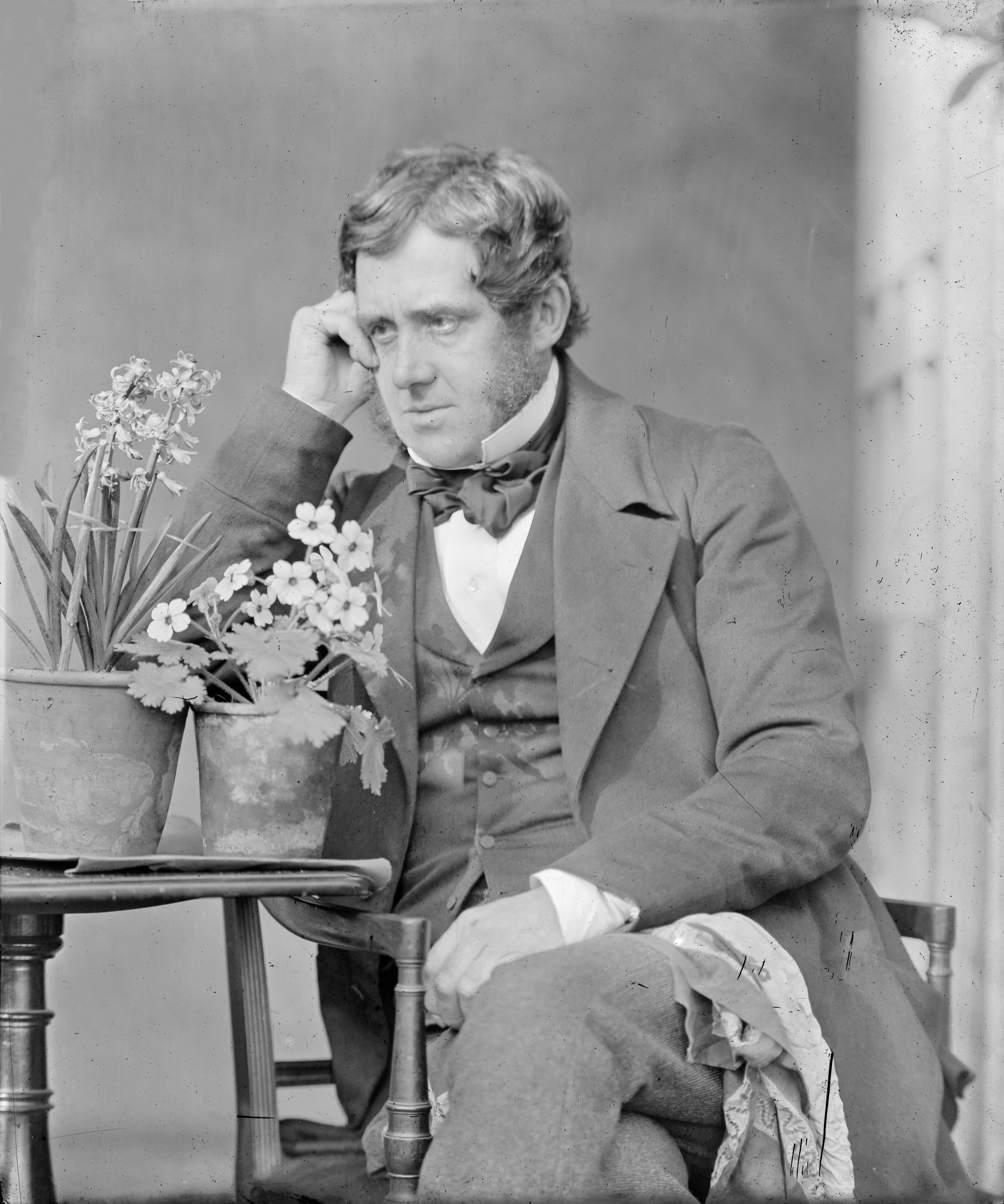
- Born: John Dillwyn; 12 January 1810; Llangyfelach, Swansea, Wales
- Died: 24 August 1882 (aged 72); Wimbledon, London, England
- Spouse: Emma Talbot (m. 1833; died 1881)
- Children: 2+, including Thereza and John
- Father: Lewis Weston Dillwyn
- Relatives: Mary Dillwyn (sister); Lewis Llewelyn Dillwyn (brother); William Dillwyn (grandfather); Willie Llewelyn (grandson); Charles Dillwyn-Venables-Llewelyn (grandson)

John Dillwyn Llewelyn FRS FRAS (12 January 1810 – 24 August 1882) was a Welsh botanist and pioneer photographer.

== Early life ==
He was born in the parish of Llangyfelach, Swansea, Wales, the eldest son of Lewis Weston Dillwyn and Mary Dillwyn, née Adams, the natural daughter of Col. John Llewelyn of Penllergaer and Ynysygerwn. His sister, Mary Dillwyn (1816–1906), is remembered as the earliest female photographer in Wales. Upon coming of age he inherited his maternal grandfather John Llewelyn's estates of Penllergaer and Ynysygerwn, near Swansea, and assumed the additional surname of Llewelyn. Educated privately, he met through his father (a Fellow of the Royal Society and the Linnean Society, and at one time a member of Parliament) many of the eminent men of his time. These included Sir David Brewster, Michael Faraday and Charles Wheatstone. His father Lewis Weston Dillwyn had been sent to Swansea in 1803 by Lewis' father William to take over the management of the Cambrian Pottery.

In 1833 he married Emma Thomasina Talbot, daughter of Thomas Mansel Talbot and Lady Mary Lucy, née Fox Strangways, the younger daughter of the Earl & Countess of Ilchester. Thomas was related to William Davenport Talbot and Mary was the sister of Elisabeth Talbot, the parents of William Henry Fox Talbot. Henry Talbot, through his botanic interests was a friend of Lewis Weston Dillwyn and spent some of his teenage years at Penrice, the home of the Welsh Talbots, also visiting Penllergaer. Emma took photographs of her own in the 1840s.

In 1835 he served as High Sheriff of Glamorgan.

== Photographic interests ==
In January 1839, following the announcements of photographic processes by both William Henry Fox Talbot and Louis Jacques Mandé Daguerre, Llewelyn, with the encouragement of Henry Talbot, began to experiment himself. He tried all the processes available. His earliest daguerreotype is dated 1840. A few of his early photogenic drawings have survived, including some cliché verre, dated 1839. Some thousand calotype and wet collodion negatives still exist together with albums in private and public collections and retained by the family.

When the Royal Photographic Society was founded in 1853, Llewelyn was one of those who attended the foundation meeting at the Society of Arts in London, and was, for some years, a founder Council member. It was suggested at one time that he become country vice-president, but nothing seems to have come of that idea. He exhibited regularly in the early exhibitions of the Society as well as in Dundee, the Manchester Art Treasures exhibition and Paris exhibition in 1855. At this latter exhibition he was amongst those awarded a silver medal for his 'Motion' series.

In 1856 he announced his own oxymel process which allowed collodion negatives to be preserved over many days. This was hailed as a boon by the Illustrated London News of July 1856. They wrote "We have heard of a new method of preserving collodion plates for a week or a fortnight discovered by Mr Llewelyn of Penllergare a gentleman to whom all photographers owe a world of thanks. The plates may be prepared at home and a boxful taken out and think of this ye tourists, as you travel along and a fine prospect meets your eye you have nothing to do but to stop your carriage, get out your camera, and in a few minutes you may secure a picture, drawn by Nature herself, that would have taken you hours to sketch..."

He also took a number of stereoscopic images by using a camera he bought for his daughter Thereza's birthday in 1856.

His last images would appear to date from the end of the 1850s after which it is possible that his health prevented any further photographic activity. He never took his camera outside Britain, though the family frequently visited mainland Europe. The majority of his images were taken around his estate of Penllergare, near Swansea, and around the Welsh coast. There are also a number taken in Cornwall over several years, many in Bristol including some pioneer animal and bird images in Clifton Zoo, Yorkshire, Derbyshire and a few in Scotland. His circle of photographic friends included Philip Henry Delamotte, Robert Hunt, Hugh Welch Diamond and especially his distant relative Calvert Richard Jones. Anecdotal diary references tell us that, in the 1840s, he was with his friend Antoine Claudet, conducting experiments on the daguerreotype process. It has been suggested that they were probably relating to the speed of exposure of the plate.

Though he never published any photographic books, he did contribute to The Sunbeam edited by his friend Philip Henry Delamotte and other books. One book by Llewelyn that was scheduled for publication was Pictures of Welsh Scenery to be published by Joseph Cundall of Bond Street, in 1854. In The Practice of Photography published in 1853 written by Philip Delamotte (or Philip H De la Motte as the publication states) an advertisement in the back announced: "Now ready, price 16s .... "Series of Photographic Pictures of Welsh Scenery" by J D Llewelyn. Published in parts 10s 6d each." The book appears not to have been published for some unknown reason and there are no references to it in surviving letters either.

== Other scientific interests ==
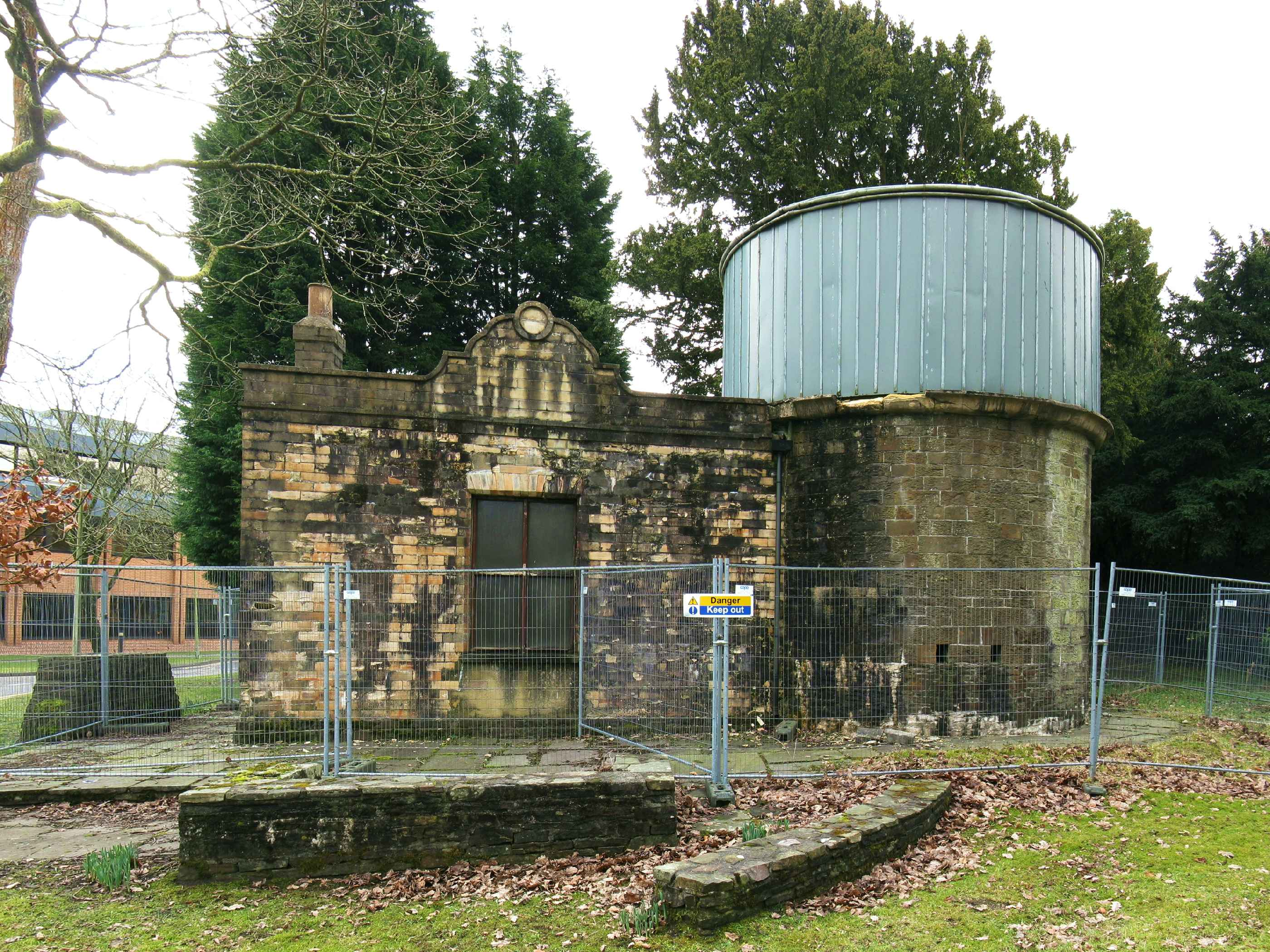
Observatory built by John Dillwyn Llewelyn

Llewelyn had many scientific and technological interests beyond photography. He built a botanical collection. He assisted Charles Wheatstone with the first ever experiments in sub-marine telegraphy, off the Mumbles, South Wales. He demonstrated a model boat powered with an electrical motor on the ornamental lake on his estate. He created the first private orchid house to replicate the original conditions of the plants in the South American jungles, heated with steam, complete with a heated waterfall.

Llewelyn had an interest in astronomy. He built a stone observatory on the estate for the use of his daughter Thereza, starting construction in 1851. The observatory housed a 4¾-inch aperture refracting telescope on an equatorial mount.

== Later life ==
Llewelyn moved to London in 1879 and died on 24 August 1882 at his home, Atherton Grange, in Wimbledon. Emma had died the previous year and both are buried at Penllergaer Church, originally built by Llewelyn for his family and estate workers. Their eldest son John Talbot Dillwyn Llewellyn became High Sheriff of Glamorgan in 1878, mayor of Swansea in 1891, and M.P. for Swansea, 1895–1900 and was created a baronet in 1890.

Llewelyn's ancestors were both Welsh and American. His great-great-grandfather, William Dillwyn, had emigrated to North America in the 17th century as a persecuted Quaker, and was granted land by William Penn and some descendants of William still live in the United States; the Parrish Art Gallery and Museum, on Long Island being founded by one of them. Another descendant was the American painter Maxfield Parrish.

A brief explanation of the different spellings of Penllergare/gaer is of interest. At the time of John Dillwyn Llewelyn's ownership of the estate, it was, and still is on the estate office seal, spelled Penllergare. The former village of Cors Einon later changed its name to Penllergaer, and the modern village of Gorseinon is now located a few miles away.

== Penllergaer Today ==
A restoration project is currently taking place at Penllergaer today by the Penllergare Trust. Guided by the unique archive of John Dillwyn Llewelyn's mid-nineteenth century photography, the upper lake will be de-silted, and steps, terraces, waterfalls and cascades will be repaired and restored to reinstate the picturesque and romantic design. The stone arched Llewelyn Bridge has now been completed; perhaps the only bridge of its type to be built in Britain in decades.

== Collections ==
Llewelyn's work is held in the following public collection:

- Swansea Museum, Swansea.
