= 1922 Gower by-election =

UK Parliamentary by-election

John Williams

The 1922 Gower by-election was held on 20 July 1922. The by-election was held due to the death of the incumbent Labour MP, John Williams. It was won by the Labour candidate David Grenfell.

1922 Gower by-election
Party	Candidate	Votes	%	±%
Labour	David Rhys Grenfell	13,296	57.5	+2.7
National Liberal	D.H. Williams	9,841	42.5	−2.7
Majority		3,455	15.0	+5.4
Turnout		23,137	73.0	+10.8
Registered electors		31,679		
Labour hold		Swing	+2.7	

== See also ==
- Gower constituency
- 1888 Gower by-election
- 1982 Gower by-election
- List of United Kingdom by-elections (1918–1931)
- United Kingdom by-election records
