= W. E. Morgan =

Welsh trade union leader (1858–1916)

William Evan Morgan (1858 – 19 February 1916) was a Welsh trade union leader.

Born in Rhos, Morgan began working at the Main Colliery in Bryncoch when he was only nine years old. Despite his limited formal education, he spent his spare time educating himself. When he was eighteen, he broke his thigh and was therefore unable to work. This led him to devote his time to trade unionism; he was elected as the first secretary of a new local miners' union, which in time became the Swansea Valley Miners' Union. In 1895, this became part of the Western Miners' Association, and Morgan continued as secretary.

Morgan spoke both Welsh and English. He won election to the Cilybebyll parish council and School Board, which he persuaded to begin teaching in Welsh in addition to English, the first parish in Wales to do so. He also served on the Pontardawe Board of Guardians, and was a governor of the Ystalyfera Intermediate School, and chaired the Alltwen and Pontardawe Co-operative Society.

In 1898, the union became the Western District of the South Wales Miners' Federation, Morgan again continuing as secretary, and winning election to its executive council. Two years later, he moved to Swansea and also became the district's sub-agent.

At the 1907 Glamorgan County Council election, Morgan stood as a Labour Party candidate in Loughor and Penderry. He was defeated by J. T. D. Llewellyn, despite receiving all but four votes in the district in which he lived. After the election, two voters from the district came forward, claiming that they had voted against him only because they did not wish him to leave the area.

Morgan began to suffer from diabetes, and was in increasingly poor health by the mid-1910s. His son died at the end of 1915, and Morgan died in February 1916.

Trade union offices
Preceded by John Williams	Secretary of the Western Miners' Association; 1895–1906	Succeeded by William Jenkins
Preceded by John Williams	Agent for the Western District of the South Wales Miners' Federation; 1906–1916	Succeeded by David Grenfell
