= Western Miners' Association =

Former trade union of the United Kingdom

- Western District Miners' Association of South Wales
- Merged into: South Wales Miners' Federation
- Founded: February 1872
- Dissolved: 1898
- Headquarters: Bridge House, Bryncoch, Neath
- Location: Wales
- Members: 4,500 (1891)
- Parent organization: Amalgamated Association of Miners (1872–1875)

The Western Miners' Association was a trade union representing coal miners in parts of South Wales, centred on Neath.

== History ==
The union originated in February 1872, when about 100 local coal miners met at the King's Head Inn and agreed to form a lodge of the Amalgamated Association of Miners (AAM). Membership grew rapidly, and by October, it claimed 1,223 members. The AAM began to struggle, and dissolved in 1875, but the Neath District survived on an independent basis.

Isaac Evans became prominent in the union, and in 1876 took a leading role in the negotiations which founded the Sliding Scale Joint Committee, to determine coal miners' wages. Two years later, he was appointed as secretary and agent for what became known as the Neath District of Miners, resigning as secretary in 1881, but remaining as agent. During the 1880s, the union was known as the Neath and Swansea Miners' Association, and by the 1890s, as the Neath, Swansea, and Llanelly District of Miners. In 1891, its membership reached 4,500, but by the end of 1892, it was down to only 2,400.

Evans and the union remained strongly supportive of the sliding scale, a position shared with some other local miners' unions, but not with the Miners' Federation of Great Britain (MFGB); it therefore did not join the MFGB. In 1895, it changed its name again, becoming the Western Miners' Association of South Wales. Evans died in 1897, and was replaced by John Williams, and in 1898 the union became part of the new South Wales Miners' Federation (SWMF).

== Western District ==
The union became the Western District of the SWMF, and retained a high level of autonomy. Williams won election as a Member of Parliament, and was replaced as agent by W. E. Morgan. Morgan died in 1916, and was replaced by David Grenfell and then D. J. Williams. In 1934, the district was merged with the Anthracite District to form Area No.1.

== Leadership ==
=== Agents ===
1878: Isaac Evans
1897: John Williams
1906: W. E. Morgan
1916: David Grenfell
1922: D. J. Williams

=== General Secretaries ===
1870s: William Hill
1878: Isaac Evans
1889: David John Morris
1895: W. E. Morgan
1906: William Jenkins
1910:
1916: D. J. Williams
1922:
1920s: Gwilym Davies
