= 1907 Glamorgan County Council election =

1907 Welsh local government election

The 1907 Glamorgan County Council election was the seventh contest for seats on this local authority in south Wales. It was preceded by the 1904 election and followed by the 1910 election.

== Overview of the result ==
As in most parts of Wales, the Liberal Party again won a majority of the seats. The Conservatives made a slight advance, notably in the western part of the county where they also held on in a number of industrial wards where the influence of paternalism remained strong. A more striking factor was the advance of Labour candidates in several areas and there were also Liberal members who were returned under a 'progressive' banner with support from the labour movement.

== Boundary changes ==
There were no boundary changes at this election.

== Retiring aldermen ==
All eleven retiring aldermen were Liberals, or Lib-Lab members as the Conservatives and their allies had been denied any seats on the aldermanic bench since the 1901 election.

== Contested elections ==
There were fewer contested elections than three years before.

=== Aberdare, Mountain Ash and Merthyr districts ===
There were only two contested elections in the Aberdare district, and both were more personal than political. It was noted that the labour movement did not show the same interest in county elections than in those for the district council.

=== Bridgend and Maesteg districts ===
There were only two contested elections in this area and in one of those, a candidate had withdrawn too late in the day and polled very few votes. The contest in Maesteg was a particularly lively one and was influenced by the political struggles in Mid Glamorgan where Vernon Hartshorn was an increasingly influential figure. Hartshorn instigated the candidacy of the local federation solicitor who defeated a candidate closely allied to the coalowners.

=== Swansea, Pontardawe and Port Talbot districts ===
In these areas the Conservatives performed well, mainly at the expense of the Liberals and also holding off Labour challenges in Pontardawe and Loughor. Labour took Cwmavon from the Liberals by a substantial majority.

== District results ==
=== Aberaman ===
Aberaman 1907
Party	Candidate	Votes	%	±%
Liberal	Thomas Luther Davies*	unopposed		
Liberal hold		Swing		

=== Aberavon ===
J.M. Smith held on to the seat he had held since 1889 by a far more comfortable majority than three years previously. His opponent, a Liberal in 1904, now stood as a Labour candidate. The result was greeted by what was said to be the liveliest crowd seen in Aberavon for many years.

Aberavon 1907
Party	Candidate	Votes	%	±%
Independent	John Morgan Smith*	710		
Labour	Frank B. Smith	450		
Majority		260		
Independent hold		Swing		

=== Aberdare Town ===
David Hughes, first elected in 1901 when he ousted David Price Davies, and re-elected in 1904 at a by-election following John William Evans's re-election as alderman, was again returned.

Aberdare Town 1907
Party	Candidate	Votes	%	±%
Liberal	David Hughes*	677		
Liberal	Edward Morgan	632		
Majority		45		
Liberal hold		Swing		

=== Barry ===
J.C. Meggitt stood down after fifteen years.

Barry 1904
Party	Candidate	Votes	%	±%
Liberal	Rev D.H. Williams	899		
Conservative	F.P. Jones-Lloyd	629		
Majority		270		
Liberal hold		Swing		

=== Blaengwawr ===
John Howell, first elected in 1895, was returned unopposed after G.A.Treharne withdrew.

Blaengwawr 1907
Party	Candidate	Votes	%	±%
Liberal	John Howell*	unopposed		
Liberal hold		Swing		

=== Cadoxton ===
This was a contest in which the controversy over the education rate featured and the sitting member, a Roman Catholic, was defeated by the clerk of the former School Board.

Cadoxton 1904
Party	Candidate	Votes	%	±%
Liberal	Gwyn Morris	729		
Liberal	P.J. O' Donnell*	492		
Majority		237		
Liberal hold		Swing		

=== Bridgend ===
Randall was returned unopposed.

Bridgend 1907
Party	Candidate	Votes	%	±%
Conservative	John Morgan Randall*	558		
Conservative hold		Swing		

=== Briton Ferry ===
Jenkin Hill recaptured the seat he lost three years previously.

Briton Ferry 1901
Party	Candidate	Votes	%	±%
Liberal	Jenkin Hill*	unopposed		
Liberal hold		Swing		

=== Caeharris ===
Caeharris 1898
Party	Candidate	Votes	%	±%
Unionist	Edward Pritchard Martin	unopposed		

=== Caerphilly ===
Caerphilly 1904
Party	Candidate	Votes	%	±%
Liberal	John Edward Evans	1,391		
Conservative	H.E. Morgan Lindsay	982		
Majority		409		
Liberal hold		Swing		

=== Cilfynydd ===
Cilfynydd 1901
Party	Candidate	Votes	%	±%
Liberal	W.R. Davies*	unopposed		
Liberal hold		Swing		

=== Coedffranc ===
Coedffranc 1901
Party	Candidate	Votes	%	±%
Liberal	William Howell	unopposed		
Liberal gain from Conservative		Swing		

=== Coity ===
On completion of his aldermanic term, William Howell was again returned.

Coity 1907
Party	Candidate	Votes	%	±%
Liberal	William Howell*	unopposed		
Liberal hold		Swing		

=== Cowbridge ===
The sitting member, a timber merchant at Pendoylan, who had captured the seat three years previously, was now returned unopposed.

Cowbridge 1907
Party	Candidate	Votes	%	±%
Liberal	Thomas William David*	unopposed		
Liberal hold		Swing		

=== Cwmavon ===
Cwmavon 1907
Party	Candidate	Votes	%	±%
Labour	Henry Davies	652		
Liberal	Griffith C. Jenkins	275		
Majority		377		
Labour gain from Liberal		Swing		

=== Cyfarthfa ===
Cyfarthfa 1898
Party	Candidate	Votes	%	±%
Lib-Lab	Thomas Thomas*	515		
Liberal	Thomas Davies	266		
Majority				
Lib-Lab gain from Liberal		Swing		

=== Cymmer ===
Cymmer 1901
Party	Candidate	Votes	%	±%
Liberal	Morgan Williams*	unopposed		
Liberal hold		Swing		

=== Dinas Powys ===
Dinas Powys
Party	Candidate	Votes	%	±%
Conservative	Oliver Henry Jones*	unopposed		
Conservative hold		Swing		

=== Dowlais ===
Dowlais 1904
Party	Candidate	Votes	%	±%
Lib-Lab	John Davies*	410		
Liberal	D. Jenkins	397		
Majority		13		
Conservative hold		Swing		

=== Dulais Valley ===
Dulais Valley
Party	Candidate	Votes	%	±%
Conservative	Evan Evans Bevan*	unopposed		
Conservative hold		Swing		

=== Ferndale ===
Ferndale 1904
Party	Candidate	Votes	%	±%
Liberal	Thomas Samuel*	1,224		
Conservative	E. Nelmes	546		
Majority		678		
Liberal hold		Swing		

=== Gadlys ===
Griffith George was opposed by Charles Vicary who described himself as a 'progressive' and a trade union candidate. Vicary claimed that there were no differences between him and George on a number of issues and denied George's claims that the contest was a sectarian one owing to Vicary being a churchman. George, first elected in 1904, held the seat by a far more comfortable majority than at his initial election.

Gadlys 1907
Party	Candidate	Votes	%	±%
Liberal	Griffith George	663		
Progressive	Charles R. Vicary	389		
Majority		274		
Liberal hold		Swing		

=== Garw Valley ===
Garw Valley
Party	Candidate	Votes	%	±%
Liberal	John Thomas*	Unopposed	N/A	N/A

=== Gellifaelog ===
Gellifaelog
Party	Candidate	Votes	%	±%
Liberal	Evan Lewis*	unopposed		

=== Gelligaer ===
Gelligaer 1904
Party	Candidate	Votes	%	±%
Liberal	Evan Thomas	739		
Conservative	D.S. Jones*	494		
Majority		245		
Liberal gain from Conservative		Swing		

=== Gower ===
Gower 1901
Party	Candidate	Votes	%	±%
	George E. Gordon*	unopposed		

=== Kibbor ===
Kibbor 1904
Party	Candidate	Votes	%	±%
Conservative	Henry Lewis*	757		
Liberal	Eli Rees	517		
Majority		240		
Conservative hold		Swing		

=== Llandaff ===
Llandaff
Party	Candidate	Votes	%	±%
Conservative	Robert Forrest*	unopposed		

=== Llandeilo Talybont ===
Llandeilo Talybont 1907
Party	Candidate	Votes	%	±%
Liberal	Samuel Williams	581		
Labour	David Evans	324		
Majority		257		
Liberal hold		Swing		

=== Llansamlet ===
Llansamlet 1901
Party	Candidate	Votes	%	±%
Conservative	John Jordan*	unopposed		

=== Llantrisant ===
Blandy Jenkins was again returned unopposed.

Llantrisant 1907
Party	Candidate	Votes	%	±%
Liberal	J. Blandy Jenkins*	unopposed		

=== Llwydcoed ===
Rees Llewellyn was again returned unopposed.

Llwydcoed 1907
Party	Candidate	Votes	%	±%
Liberal	Rees Llewellyn*	unopposed		

=== Llwynypia and Clydach ===
James Evans, grocer, elected following Richard Lewis's election as alderman in 1901, was returned unopposed.

Llwynypia and Clydach 1904
Party	Candidate	Votes	%	±%
Liberal	James Evans*	unopposed		

=== Loughor and Penderry ===
Llewelyn, sitting member and a member of the authority since its formation, was opposed by W. E. Morgan, miners' agent in the Western District of the South Wales Miners' Federation and a well known labour leader. Llewelyn, in view of his status as a landowner and employer, attracted widespread support and favourable reports of his public meetings appeared in the Cambrian newspaper. At the election, Llewelyn was said to have majority support in Gorseinon and Gowerton, although Tirdeunaw was said to favour Llewelyn. After his defeat, Morgan stated that as a working man he had only been campaigning for a week.

Loughor and Penderry 1907
Party	Candidate	Votes	%	±%
Conservative	J. T. D. Llewellyn*	687		
Labour	W. E. Morgan	457		
Majority		230		
Conservative hold		Swing		

=== Maesteg ===
This was a fierce contest between Evan Davies, solicitor to the local miners' union and described by opponents as the Federation candidate and J.P. Gibbon, chairman of Maesteg Urban District Council and a local mineral agent. Davies responded to attacks by describing Gibbon as the candidate of North's Navigation collieries who had not been adopted by any public meeting or organisation Vernon Hartshorn played a prominent role in Davies's campaign and even brought Adela Pankhurst to address his final meeting, something which was not welcomed universally.

Maesteg 1907
Party	Candidate	Votes	%	±%
Liberal	Evan Davies	1,444		
	J.P. Gibbon	1,207		

=== Margam ===
The Liberal candidate, who captured the seat three years previously, narrowly held on. The Conservatives had been confident of victory and the result was said to have been witnessed by one of the largest crowds seen in Port Talbot for many years.

Margam 1907
Party	Candidate	Votes	%	±%
Liberal	Edward T. Evans*	892		
Independent	Gordon Lipscombe	867		
Majority		25		
Liberal hold		Swing		

=== Merthyr Town ===
Merthyr Town 1904
Party	Candidate	Votes	%	±%
Liberal	D.D. Jones	663		
Conservative	Dan Thomas	297		
Majority		366		
Liberal hold		Swing		

=== Merthyr Vale ===
Merthyr Vale 1904
Party	Candidate	Votes	%	±%
Liberal	David Prosser*	880		
Liberal	Rowland Evans	729		
Majority		151		
Liberal hold		Swing		

=== Morriston ===
Morriston 1907
Party	Candidate	Votes	%	±%
Liberal	William John Percy Player	unopposed		
Liberal hold		Swing		

=== Mountain Ash ===
Mountain Ash
Party	Candidate	Votes	%	±%
Liberal	Thomas Morris	549		
Liberal	Samuel Evans	459		
Liberal	John Lewis	316		
Majority		90		
Liberal hold		Swing		

=== Neath (North) ===
Neath (North) 1907
Party	Candidate	Votes	%	±%
Unionist	Hopkin Morgan	Unopposed	N/A	N/A
Unionist hold				

=== Neath (South) ===
At the previous election, Trick had stood as a Conservative.

Neath (South) 1898
Party	Candidate	Votes	%	±%
Independent	W.B. Trick	unopposed		
Independent gain from Liberal		Swing		

=== Newcastle ===
John Thomas switched to Newcastle.

Newcastle 1907
Party	Candidate	Votes	%	±%
Liberal	John Thomas**	Unopposed	N/A	N/A
Liberal hold				

=== Ogmore ===
The sitting member, a timber merchant of Porthcawl, was returned unopposed after the former member, J.D. Nicholl of Merthyr Mawr, declined to oppose him.

Ogmore 1907
Party	Candidate	Votes	%	±%
Liberal	George Sibbering Jones*	521		
Liberal hold		Swing		

=== Ogmore Valley ===
David John Thomas, surgeon of Nantymoel, was returned unopposed. A mass meeting of workmen at Nantymoel had decided not to field a labour candidate and to concentrate on the district elections.

Ogmore Valley 1907
Party	Candidate	Votes	%	±%
Liberal	David John Thomas*	unopposed		
Liberal hold		Swing		

=== Oystermouth ===
Oystermouth 1901
Party	Candidate	Votes	%	±%
	T.W. James	unopposed		
		Swing		

=== Penarth North ===
Penarth North 1904
Party	Candidate	Votes	%	±%
Conservative	Rev E.S. Roberts	387		
Liberal	Jenkin Llewellyn	385		
Majority		2		
Conservative hold		Swing		

=== Penarth South ===
Penarth South
Party	Candidate	Votes	%	±%
	Frederick Henry Jotham	unopposed		

=== Penrhiwceiber ===
Penrhiwceiber
Party	Candidate	Votes	%	±%
Liberal	Dr. R. W. Jones	unopposed		
Liberal hold		Swing		

=== Pentre ===
E.T. Davies, auctioneer, had been elected at a by-election following Elias Henry Davies's appointment as alderman in 1902. He was now returned unopposed.

Pentre 1904
Party	Candidate	Votes	%	±%
Liberal	E.T. Davies	unopposed		
Liberal hold		Swing		

=== Penydarren ===
Penydarren
Party	Candidate	Votes	%	±%
Liberal	David Davies*	516		
Conservative	T.E. Morgan	270		
Majority		146		

=== Pontardawe ===
Having defeated the Liberal candidate by 1 vote only in 1904, the sitting member, Frank Gilbertson was now opposed by a Labour candidate, Johnny James, check weigher at Cwmgors Colliery. James fared less well than his predecessor, however, in seeking to oust Gilbertson.

Pontardawe 1907
Party	Candidate	Votes	%	±%
Conservative	Frank W. Gilbertson*	922		
Labour	Johnny James	710		
Majority		212		
Conservative hold		Swing		

=== Plymouth ===
Plymouth
Party	Candidate	Votes	%	±%
Liberal	Henry W. Lewis*	603		
Conservative	A. Daniel	440		

=== Pontlottyn ===
Pontlottyn 1904
Party	Candidate	Votes	%	±%
Liberal	D.B. Owen	572		
Liberal	John Griffiths	372		
Majority		200		
Liberal hold		Swing		

=== Pontypridd ===
The seat was now known as Pontypridd and Rhondda

Pontypridd 1904
Party	Candidate	Votes	%	±%
Labour	Fleming	602		
Liberal	James Roberts*	398		
Conservative	H.M. Gregory	383		
Majority		204		
Labour gain from Liberal		Swing		

=== Penygraig ===
The sitting member was defeated.

Penygraig 1907
Party	Candidate	Votes	%	±%
Independent	Dr Llewellyn	519		
Liberal	Rees Lloyd*	340		
Independent gain from Liberal		Swing		

=== Porth ===
Porth and Penygraig 1904
Party	Candidate	Votes	%	±%
Lib-Lab	D. Watts Morgan	967		
Liberal	W.T. Davies	862		
Majority		105		
Liberal hold		Swing		

=== Resolven ===
Resolven 1901
Party	Candidate	Votes	%	±%
Liberal	Daniel Evans**	unopposed		
Liberal hold		Swing		

=== Sketty ===
John Davies had been defeated in the two previous elections but was now returned unopposed.

Sketty 1901
Party	Candidate	Votes	%	±%
Liberal	Rev John Davies	unopposed		
Liberal gain from Conservative		Swing		

=== Swansea Valley ===
Swansea Valley 1904
Party	Candidate	Votes	%	±%
Liberal	E. Lewis*	825		
Liberal	Dr J. Jones	364		
Majority		461		
Liberal hold		Swing		

=== Treforest ===
James Roberts had won the seat at a by-election following the death of the previous member, David Leyshon

Treforest 1898
Party	Candidate	Votes	%	±%
Independent	Samuel Evans	671		
Liberal	James Roberts*	614		
Majority		57		

=== Treherbert ===
Enoch Davies, returned in 1901 following William Morgan's re-election as alderman, was elected unopposed.

Treherbert 1904
Party	Candidate	Votes	%	±%
Liberal	Enoch Davies*	unopposed		
Liberal hold		Swing		

=== Treorchy ===
Thomas Jones, Co-operative stores manager, was returned unopposed.

Treorchy 1904
Party	Candidate	Votes	%	±%
Liberal	Thomas Jones*	unopposed		
Liberal hold		Swing		

=== Trealaw and Tonypandy ===
D.W. Davies, the member since 1898, was again returned.

Tonypandy 1907
Party	Candidate	Votes	%	±%
Liberal	D.W. Davies*	738		
Conservative	William Morgan	523		
	William Richards	28		
Liberal hold		Swing		

=== Tylorstown and Ynyshir ===
Sitting councillor Dr T.H. Morris stood down to allow Alderman W.H. Mathias to be returned unopposed.

Tylorstown and Ynyshir 1904
Party	Candidate	Votes	%	±%
Liberal	W.H. Mathias**	unopposed		
Liberal hold		Swing		

=== Ystalyfera ===
Ystalyfera 1907
Party	Candidate	Votes	%	±%
Labour	John Griffiths	453		
Liberal	James Williams*	380		
Majority		73		
Labour gain from Liberal		Swing		

=== Ystrad ===
Clifford Cory, the member since 1892, was once again returned unopposed.

Ystrad 1904
Party	Candidate	Votes	%	±%
Liberal	Clifford John Cory*	unopposed		
Liberal hold		Swing		

== Election of aldermen ==
In addition to the 66 councillors the council consisted of 22 county aldermen. Aldermen were elected by the council, and served a six-year term. Following the 1907 election, there were twelve Aldermanic vacancies.

The following aldermen were appointed by the newly elected council.

elected for six years

- W.R. Davies, Liberal (elected councillor at Cilfynydd)
- J.E. Evans
- Jenkin Hill, Liberal, retiring alderman (elected councillor at Briton Ferry)
- John Thomas, Liberal-Labour, retiring alderman, (elected councillor at Newcastle)
- E.H. Davies
- Richard Lewis, Liberal, retiring alderman (elected councillor at Llwynypia and Clydach)
- William Morgan, Liberal, retiring alderman (elected councillor at Treherbert)
- Morgan Williams, Liberal, retiring alderman Ynyshir
- John Davies
- John Morgan
- Thomas Jones, Liberal, Swansea Valley
- Rees Llewellyn

elected for three years

== Results ==
=== Aberaman ===
Aberaman 1907
Party	Candidate	Votes	%	±%
Liberal	Thomas Luther Davies*	unopposed		
Liberal hold		Swing		

=== Aberavon ===
J.M. Smith held on to the seat he had held since 1889 by a far more comfortable majority than three years previously. His opponent, a Liberal in 1904, now stood as a Labour candidate. The result was greeted by what was said to be the liveliest crowd seen in Aberavon for many years.

Aberavon 1907
Party	Candidate	Votes	%	±%
Independent	John Morgan Smith*	710		
Labour	Frank B. Smith	450		
Majority		260		
Independent hold		Swing		

=== Aberdare Town ===
David Hughes, first elected in 1901 when he ousted David Price Davies, and re-elected in 1904 at a by-election following John William Evans's re-election as alderman, was again returned.

Aberdare Town 1907
Party	Candidate	Votes	%	±%
Liberal	David Hughes*	677		
Liberal	Edward Morgan	632		
Majority		45		
Liberal hold		Swing		

=== Barry ===
J.C. Meggitt stood down after fifteen years.

Barry 1904
Party	Candidate	Votes	%	±%
Liberal	Rev D.H. Williams	899		
Conservative	F.P. Jones-Lloyd	629		
Majority		270		
Liberal hold		Swing		

=== Blaengwawr ===
John Howell, first elected in 1895, was returned unopposed after G.A.Treharne withdrew.

Blaengwawr 1907
Party	Candidate	Votes	%	±%
Liberal	John Howell*	unopposed		
Liberal hold		Swing		

=== Cadoxton ===
This was a contest in which the controversy over the education rate featured and the sitting member, a Roman Catholic, was defeated by the clerk of the former School Board.

Cadoxton 1904
Party	Candidate	Votes	%	±%
Liberal	Gwyn Morris	729		
Liberal	P.J. O' Donnell*	492		
Majority		237		
Liberal hold		Swing		

=== Bridgend ===
Randall was returned unopposed (check political affiliation).

Bridgend 1904
Party	Candidate	Votes	%	±%
Conservative	John Morgan Randall*	558		
Conservative hold		Swing		

=== Briton Ferry ===
Jenkin Hill recaptured the seat he lost three years previously.

Briton Ferry 1901
Party	Candidate	Votes	%	±%
Liberal	Jenkin Hill*	unopposed		
Liberal hold		Swing		

=== Caeharris ===
Caeharris 1898
Party	Candidate	Votes	%	±%
Unionist	Edward Pritchard Martin	unopposed		

=== Caerphilly ===
Caerphilly 1904
Party	Candidate	Votes	%	±%
Liberal	John Edward Evans	1,391		
Conservative	H.B.M. Lindsay	982		
Majority		409		
Liberal hold		Swing		

=== Cilfynydd ===
Cilfynydd 1901
Party	Candidate	Votes	%	±%
Liberal	W.R. Davies*	unopposed		
Liberal hold		Swing		

=== Coedffranc ===
Coedffranc 1901
Party	Candidate	Votes	%	±%
Liberal	William Howell	unopposed		
Liberal gain from Conservative		Swing		

=== Coity ===
On completion of his aldermanic term, William Howell was again returned.

Coity 1907
Party	Candidate	Votes	%	±%
Liberal	William Howell*	unopposed		
Liberal hold		Swing		

=== Cowbridge ===
The sitting member, a timber merchant at Pendoylan, who had captured the seat three years previously, was now returned unopposed.

Cowbridge 1907
Party	Candidate	Votes	%	±%
Liberal	Thomas William David*	unopposed		
Liberal hold		Swing		

=== Cwmavon ===
Cwmavon 1907
Party	Candidate	Votes	%	±%
Labour	Henry Davies	652		
Liberal	Griffith C. Jenkins	275		
Majority		377		
Labour gain from Liberal		Swing		

=== Cyfarthfa ===
Cyfarthfa 1898
Party	Candidate	Votes	%	±%
Lib-Lab	Thomas Thomas*	515		
Liberal	Thomas Davies	266		
Majority				
Lib-Lab gain from Liberal		Swing		

=== Cymmer ===
Cymmer 1901
Party	Candidate	Votes	%	±%
Liberal	Morgan Williams*	unopposed		
Liberal hold		Swing		

=== Dinas Powys ===
Dinas Powys
Party	Candidate	Votes	%	±%
Conservative	Oliver Henry Jones*	unopposed		
Conservative hold		Swing		

=== Dowlais ===
Dowlais 1904
Party	Candidate	Votes	%	±%
Conservative	J. Davies*	410		
Liberal	D. Jenkins	397		
Majority		13		
Conservative hold		Swing		

=== Dulais Valley ===
Dulais Valley
Party	Candidate	Votes	%	±%
Conservative	Evan Evans Bevan*	unopposed		
Conservative hold		Swing		

=== Ferndale ===
Ferndale 1904
Party	Candidate	Votes	%	±%
Liberal	Thomas Samuel*	1,224		
Conservative	E. Nelmes	546		
Majority		678		
Liberal hold		Swing		

=== Gadlys ===
Griffith George was opposed by Charles Vicary who described himself as a 'progressive' and a trade union candidate. Vicary claimed that there were no differences between him and George on a number of issues and denied George's claims that the contest was a sectarian one owing to Vicary being a churchman. George, first elected in 1904, held the seat by a far more comfortable majority than at his initial election.

Gadlys 1907
Party	Candidate	Votes	%	±%
Liberal	Griffith George	663		
Progressive	Charles R. Vicary	389		
Majority		274		
Liberal hold		Swing		

=== Garw Valley ===
Garw Valley
Party	Candidate	Votes	%	±%
Liberal	John Thomas*	unopposed		

=== Gellifaelog ===
Gellifaelog
Party	Candidate	Votes	%	±%
Liberal	Evan Lewis*	unopposed		

=== Gelligaer ===
Gelligaer 1904
Party	Candidate	Votes	%	±%
Liberal	Evan Thomas	739		
Conservative	D.S. Jones*	494		
Majority		245		
Liberal gain from Conservative		Swing		

=== Gower ===
Gower 1901
Party	Candidate	Votes	%	±%
	George E. Gordon*	unopposed		

=== Kibbor ===
Kibbor 1904
Party	Candidate	Votes	%	±%
Conservative	Henry Lewis*	757		
Liberal	Eli Rees	517		
Majority		240		
Conservative hold		Swing		

=== Llandaff ===
Llandaff
Party	Candidate	Votes	%	±%
Conservative	Robert Forrest*	unopposed		

=== Llandeilo Talybont ===
Llandeilo Talybont 1907
Party	Candidate	Votes	%	±%
Liberal	Samuel Williams	581		
Labour	David Evans	324		
Majority		257		
Liberal hold		Swing		

=== Llansamlet ===
Llansamlet 1901
Party	Candidate	Votes	%	±%
Conservative	John Jordan*	unopposed		

=== Llantrisant ===
Blandy Jenkins was again returned unopposed.

Llantrisant 1907
Party	Candidate	Votes	%	±%
Liberal	J. Blandy Jenkins*	unopposed		

=== Llwydcoed ===
Rees Llewellyn was again returned unopposed.

Llwydcoed 1907
Party	Candidate	Votes	%	±%
Liberal	Rees Llewellyn*	unopposed		

=== Llwynypia and Clydach ===
James Evans, grocer, elected following Richard Lewis's election as alderman in 1901, was returned unopposed.

Llwynypia and Clydach 1904
Party	Candidate	Votes	%	±%
Liberal	James Evans*	unopposed		

=== Loughor and Penderry ===
Llewelyn, sitting member and a member of the authority since its formation, was opposed by W.E. Morgan, miners' agent in the Western District of the South Wales Miners' Federation and a well known labour leader. Llewelyn, in view of his status as a landowner and employer, attracted widespread support and favourable reports of his public meetings appeared in the Cambrian newspaper. At the election, Llewelyn was said to have majority support in Gorseinon and Gowerton, although Tirdeunaw was said to favour Llewelyn. After his defeat, Morgan stated that as a working man he had only been campaigning for a week.

Loughor and Penderry 1907
Party	Candidate	Votes	%	±%
Conservative	Sir J.T.D. Llewellyn*	687		
Labour	W.E. Morgan	457		
Majority		230		
Conservative hold		Swing		

=== Maesteg ===
This was a fierce contest between Evan Davies, solicitor to the local miners' union and described by opponents as the Federation candidate and J.P. Gibbon, chairman of Maesteg Urban District Council and a local mineral agent. Davies responded to attacks by describing Gibbon as the candidate of North's Navigation collieries who had not been adopted by any public meeting or organisation Vernon Hartshorn played a prominent role in Davies's campaign and even brought Adela Pankhurst to address his final meeting, something which was not welcomed universally.

Maesteg 1907
Party	Candidate	Votes	%	±%
Liberal	Evan E. Davies	1,444		
	J.P. Gibbon	1,207		

=== Margam ===
The Liberal candidate, who captured the seat three years previously, narrowly held on. The Conservatives had been confident of victory and the result was said to have been witnessed by one of the largest crowds seen in Port Talbot for many years.

Margam 1907
Party	Candidate	Votes	%	±%
Liberal	Edward T. Evans*	892		
Independent	Gordon Lipscombe	867		
Majority		25		
Liberal hold		Swing		

=== Merthyr Town ===
Merthyr Town 1904
Party	Candidate	Votes	%	±%
Liberal	D.D. Jones	663		
Conservative	Dan Thomas	297		
Majority		366		
Liberal hold		Swing		

=== Merthyr Vale ===
Merthyr Vale 1904
Party	Candidate	Votes	%	±%
Liberal	David Prosser*	880		
Liberal	Rowland Evans	729		
Majority		151		
Liberal hold		Swing		

=== Morriston ===
Morriston 1901
Party	Candidate	Votes	%	±%
	William John Percy Player	unopposed		
	Liberal hold	Swing		

=== Mountain Ash ===
Mountain Ash
Party	Candidate	Votes	%	±%
Liberal	Thomas Morris	549		
Liberal	Samuel Evans	459		
Liberal	John Lewis	316		
Majority		90		
Liberal hold		Swing		

=== Neath (North) ===
Neath (North)1898
Party	Candidate	Votes	%	±%
	Hopkin Morgan	unopposed		
	Unionist hold	Swing		

=== Neath (South) ===
At the previous election, Trick had stood as a Conservative.

Neath (South) 1898
Party	Candidate	Votes	%	±%
Independent	W.B. Trick	unopposed		
Conservative gain from Liberal		Swing		

=== Newcastle by-election ===
The Conservative won a surprising victory in an election largely fought on the issue of education.

Newcastle by-election 1907
Party	Candidate	Votes	%	±%
Conservative	E.F. Lynch-Blosse	657		
Liberal	John Matthews	559		
Conservative gain from Liberal		Swing		

=== Ogmore ===
The sitting member, a timber merchant of Porthcawl, was returned unopposed after the former member, J.D. Nicholl of Merthyr Mawr, declined to oppose him.

Ogmore 1907
Party	Candidate	Votes	%	±%
Liberal	George Sibbering Jones*	521		
Liberal hold		Swing		

=== Ogmore Valley ===
David John Thomas, surgeon of Nantymoel, was returned unopposed. A mass meeting of workmen at Nantymoel had decided not to field a labour candidate and to concentrate on the district elections.

Ogmore Valley 1907
Party	Candidate	Votes	%	±%
Liberal	David John Thomas*	unopposed		
Liberal hold		Swing		

=== Oystermouth ===
Oystermouth 1901
Party	Candidate	Votes	%	±%
	T.W. James	unopposed		
		Swing		

=== Penarth North ===
Penarth North 1904
Party	Candidate	Votes	%	±%
Conservative	Rev E.S. Roberts	387		
Liberal	Jenkin Llewellyn	385		
Majority		2		
Conservative hold		Swing		

=== Penarth South ===
Penarth South
Party	Candidate	Votes	%	±%
	Frederick Henry Jotham	unopposed		

=== Penrhiwceiber ===
Penrhiwceiber
Party	Candidate	Votes	%	±%
	Dr. R. W. Jones	unopposed		
	Liberal hold	Swing		

=== Pentre ===
E.T. Davies, auctioneer, had been elected at a by-election following Elias Henry Davies's appointment as alderman in 1902. He was now returned unopposed.

Pentre 1904
Party	Candidate	Votes	%	±%
Liberal	E.T. Davies	unopposed		
Liberal hold		Swing		

=== Penydarren ===
Penydarren
Party	Candidate	Votes	%	±%
Liberal	David Davies*	516		
Conservative	T.E. Morgan	270		
Majority		146		

=== Pontardawe ===
Having defeated the Liberal candidate by 1 vote only in 1904, the sitting member, Frank Gilbertson was now opposed by a Labour candidate, Johnny James, check weigher at Cwmgors Colliery. James fared less well than his predecessor, however, in seeking to oust Gilbertson.

Pontardawe 1907
Party	Candidate	Votes	%	±%
Conservative	Frank W. Gilbertson*	922		
Labour	Johnny James	710		
Majority		212		
Conservative hold		Swing		

=== Plymouth ===
Plymouth
Party	Candidate	Votes	%	±%
Liberal	Henry W. Lewis*	603		
Conservative	A. Daniel	440		

=== Pontlottyn ===
Pontlottyn 1904
Party	Candidate	Votes	%	±%
Liberal	D.B. Owen	572		
Liberal	John Griffiths	372		
Majority		200		
Liberal hold		Swing		

=== Pontypridd ===
The seat was now known as Pontypridd and Rhondda

Pontypridd 1904
Party	Candidate	Votes	%	±%
Labour	Fleming	602		
Liberal	James Roberts*	398		
Conservative	H.M. Gregory	383		
Majority		204		
Labour gain from Liberal		Swing		

=== Penygraig ===
Penygraig appears to be a new ward.

Penygraig 1904
Party	Candidate	Votes	%	±%
Liberal	Rees Lloyd	unopposed		
Liberal hold		Swing		

=== Porth ===
Porth and Penygraig 1904
Party	Candidate	Votes	%	±%
Lib-Lab	D. Watts Morgan	967		
Liberal	W.T. Davies	862		
Majority		105		
Liberal hold		Swing		

=== Resolven ===
Resolven 1901
Party	Candidate	Votes	%	±%
Liberal	Daniel Evans**	unopposed		
Liberal hold		Swing		

=== Sketty ===
John Davies had been defeated in the two previous elections but was now returned unopposed.

Sketty 1901
Party	Candidate	Votes	%	±%
Liberal	Rev John Davies	unopposed		
Liberal gain from Conservative		Swing		

=== Swansea Valley ===
Swansea Valley 1904
Party	Candidate	Votes	%	±%
Liberal	E. Lewis*	825		
Liberal	Dr J. Jones	364		
Majority		461		
Liberal hold		Swing		

=== Treforest ===
James Roberts had won the seat at a by-election following the death of the previous member, David Leyshon

Treforest 1898
Party	Candidate	Votes	%	±%
Independent	Samuel Evans	671		
Liberal	James Roberts*	614		
Majority		57		

=== Treherbert by-election ===
Enoch Davies, originally returned in 1901 following William Morgan's re-election as alderman, was re-elected after a close fight with another Liberal.

Treherbert by-election 1907
Party	Candidate	Votes	%	±%
Liberal	Enoch Davies*	787		
Liberal	Evan Watkins	611		
Liberal hold		Swing		

=== Treorchy ===
Thomas Jones, Co-operative stores manager, was returned unopposed.

Treorchy 1904
Party	Candidate	Votes	%	±%
Liberal	Thomas Jones*	unopposed		
Liberal hold		Swing		

=== Trealaw and Tonypandy ===
D.W. Davies, the member since 1898, was returned unopposed for the second successive election.

Tonypandy 1904
Party	Candidate	Votes	%	±%
Liberal	D.W. Davies*	unopposed		
Liberal hold		Swing		

=== Tylorstown and Ynyshir ===
Sitting councillor Dr T.H. Morris stood down to allow Alderman W.H. Mathias to be returned unopposed.

Tylorstown and Ynyshir 1904
Party	Candidate	Votes	%	±%
Liberal	W.H. Mathias**	unopposed		
Liberal hold		Swing		

=== Ystalyfera ===
Ystalyfera 1907
Party	Candidate	Votes	%	±%
Labour	John Griffiths	453		
Liberal	James Williams*	380		
Majority		73		
Labour gain from Liberal		Swing		

=== Ystrad ===
Clifford Cory, the member since 1892, was once again returned unopposed.

Ystrad 1904
Party	Candidate	Votes	%	±%
Liberal	Clifford John Cory*	unopposed		
Liberal hold		Swing		

== Bibliography ==
- Williams, Chris (1996). Democratic Rhondda: Politics and society 1885-1951. Cardiff: University of Wales Press.
