= David Randell =

British Member of Parliament

David Randell

David Randell (1854 – 5 June 1912), was a Welsh solicitor and a radical Liberal Party politician. He was Member of Parliament for Gower from 1888 to 1900.

== Background ==
Randell was born the second son of John Randell of Llanelly and Mary Jones. In 1880 he married Sarah George and they had two children.

== Career ==
Randell qualified as a solicitor in 1878. He specialised in trade union litigation, protecting coal miners and tinplate workers on safety issues.

== The Gower by-election, 1888 ==
In 1888 a vacancy arose in the Gower division of Glamorganshire following the death of Frank Ash Yeo, the member since the constituency was formed three years earlier. The Liberal Association rapidly chose Sir Horace Davey to contest the seat. However, on the same day local trade unionists met at Morriston and invited Randell to contest the seat. The 1888 Gower by-election was thus an important landmark in Welsh political history.

== Later political career ==
Gower was a Liberal seat and he managed to hold it at the by-election and at the general elections that followed in 1892 and 1895. He was a radical Liberal who supported Welsh disestablishment from the Church of England, Welsh self-government, votes for women and trade union rights. In 1900 he stood down from parliament for health reasons and did not run again.

Parliament of the United Kingdom
Preceded by Frank Ash Yeo	Member of Parliament for Gower; 1888–1900	Succeeded by John Aeron Thomas
