= Byron Davies, Baron Davies of Gower =

British politician (born 1952)

The Right Honourable The Lord Davies of Gower
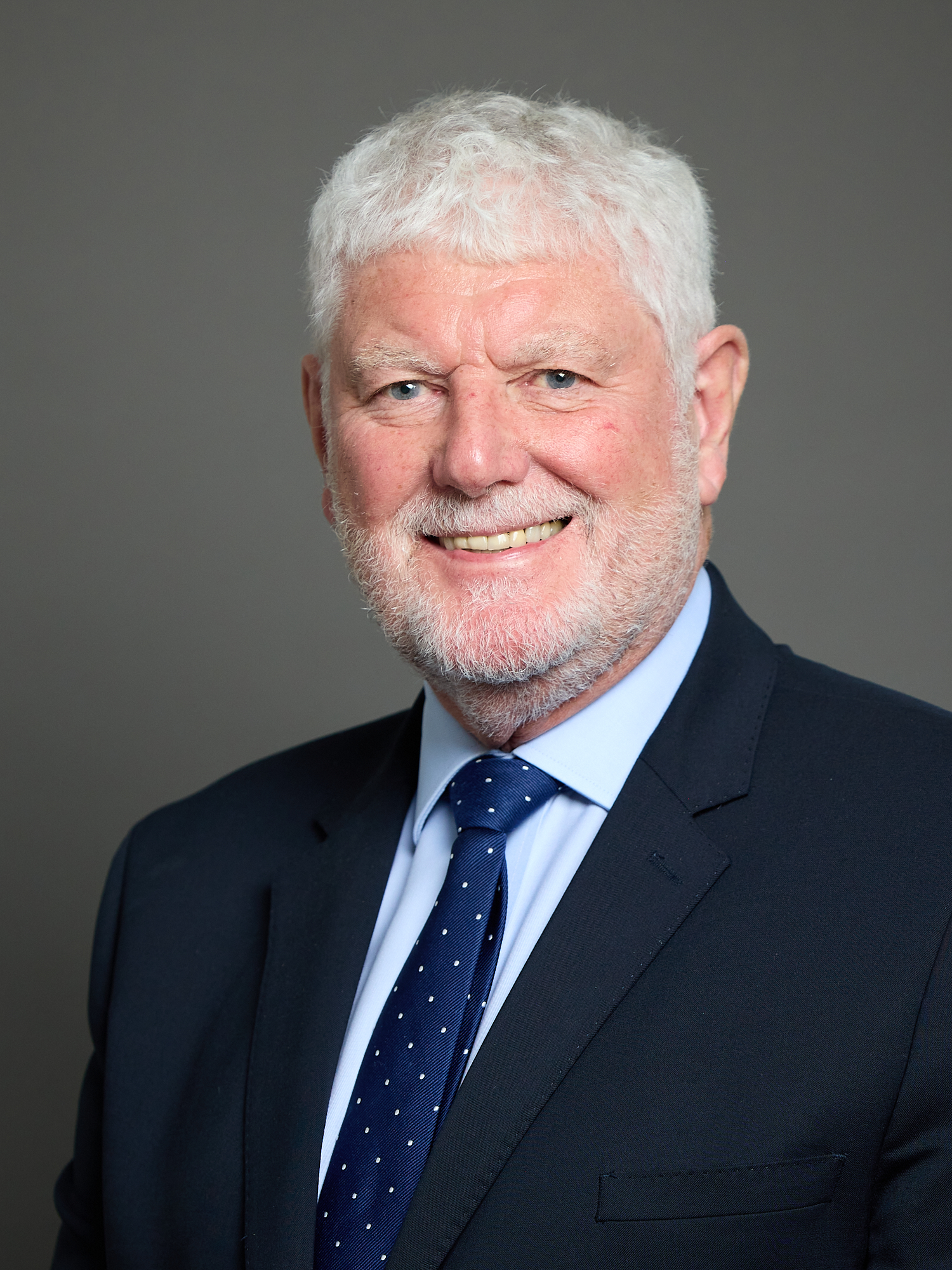
- Official portrait, 2025

Shadow Minister for Home Affairs
- Incumbent
- Assumed office 11 November 2024
- Leader: Kemi Badenoch
- Preceded by: The Lord Sharpe of Epsom

Shadow Secretary of State for Wales
- In office 8 July 2024 – 5 November 2024
- Leader: Rishi Sunak
- Preceded by: Jo Stevens
- Succeeded by: Mims Davies

Parliamentary Under-Secretary of State for Maritime and Security
- In office 14 November 2023 – 5 July 2024
- Prime Minister: Rishi Sunak
- Preceded by: The Baroness Vere of Norbiton
- Succeeded by: Mike Kane

Lord-in-Waiting Government Whip
- In office 22 September 2022 – 14 November 2023
- Prime Minister: Liz Truss; Rishi Sunak
- Succeeded by: The Lord Gascoigne

Member of the House of Lords
- Lord Temporal
- Life peerage 10 October 2019

Member of Parliament for Gower
- In office 7 May 2015 – 3 May 2017
- Preceded by: Martin Caton
- Succeeded by: Tonia Antoniazzi

Member of the Welsh Assembly for South Wales
- In office 6 May 2011 – 15 May 2015
- Preceded by: David Lloyd
- Succeeded by: Altaf Hussain

Personal details
- Born: Henry Byron Davies; 4 September 1952 (age 74) Swansea, Wales
- Party: Conservative
- Spouse: Gillian Adderley (m. 1978)
- Children: 1
- Education: Gowerton School
- Alma mater: University of West London (LLB)

Henry Byron Davies, Baron Davies of Gower (born 4 September 1952), is a Welsh Conservative politician, Life Peer and former Metropolitan Police Detective Chief Inspector.

President of the Welsh Conservative Party since 2020, Lord Davies served as Shadow Secretary of State for Wales from July to November 2024. He was a Member of the Welsh Assembly for South Wales West from 2011 to 2015, and Member of Parliament for Gower from 2015 to 2017, before being elevated to the peerage in 2019.

== Early life and career ==
Born in 1952 at Port Eynon on the Gower Peninsula, to the late William John Davies and Gladys Mary Davies. Byron Davies was educated at Knelston County Primary School and Gowerton School, then an all-boys grammar school. He later read law at the University of West London, graduating LLB.

From 1971 to 2003, he served as a career detective in the Metropolitan Police. Seconded to the National Crime Squad to specialise in combating organised crime, Davies was posted to Eastern Europe, on behalf of the European Union, where he was also tasked with helping to prepare EU candidate countries for accession. Promoted detective chief inspector, Davies retired from the police force to become a consultant advising foreign governments on organised crime.

== Political career ==
Unsuccessfully contesting Gower as the Conservative candidate at both the Welsh Assembly Election 2007 and the 2010 general election, Davies was elected to the National Assembly for Wales representing South Wales West in 2011. Returned as Member of Parliament for Gower at the 2015 general election, having vanquished the 109-year Labour stronghold of Gower Constituency for the Conservatives, on 9 May 2015 (three days after the Westminster election), Davies decided to step down as an Assembly Member to focus on his parliamentary duties for Gower.

Davies opposed Brexit prior to the 2016 referendum and lost his seat at the 2017 general election.

Created a Life Peer in 2019, Lord Davies served under PM Rishi Sunak in the Wales Office, as a Government Whip and latterly as Parliamentary Under-Secretary of State for the Department for Transport.

=== Post-Commons career ===
From September 2017 to September 2020, Davies served as Chairman of the Welsh Conservatives succeeding the former MP and MEP Jonathan Evans.

=== House of Lords ===
Davies was nominated for a life peerage in Theresa May's resignation honours list on 10 September 2019. He was created Baron Davies of Gower, of Gower in the County of Swansea, on 10 October 2019. Lord Davies served as a Government Whip under both Liz Truss and Rishi Sunak from 2022 to 2023 before, in November 2023, being appointed as Parliamentary Under-Secretary of State for Transport in which position he served until the end of Sunak's administration.

In January 2025, Davies was elected as a Co-Chair for the All-Party Parliamentary Group (APPG) for the Western Gateway.

=== Shadow frontbench ===
Following the 2024 general election when no Conservative MPs were elected in Wales, Lord Davies was appointed Shadow Secretary of State for Wales in the Shadow Cabinet of Rishi Sunak; this marks the first time that the position was held by a member of the House of Lords.

In an op-ed, Lord Davies said that his number one task in the role would be to ensure the Welsh Conservatives are “fully prepared for our much-anticipated comeback over the coming months and years.”

Following an exercise involving engaging public opinion as to whether the Welsh Conservatives should support the abolition of devolution, Lord Davies criticised the Senedd Conservative Group leader Andrew RT Davies, saying: “On the issue of abolishing the Senedd, the Conservative Party has no plans to support a move towards this and I see any action to test public opinion on this as completely futile.”

Lord Davies was replaced as Shadow Secretary of State for Wales in November 2024 with Mims Davies. Lord Davies was subsequently appointed Shadow Minister for Home Affairs in the House of Lords on 11 November 2024.

== Personal life ==
One of the main reasons for his electoral defeat in 2017, Davies claimed, was a member of the public claiming in online platforms that he was “being investigated for electoral fraud”. The claim was false and Davies successfully sued.

In 1978, he married Gillian Adderley, having one son; the pair live in Ceredigion, Wales.

He is also a member of the Carlton Club, Royal Air Force Club and the Farmers Club.

== Honours ==

Ribbon	Details	Year awarded
	Queen Elizabeth II Golden Jubilee Medal	2002
	Police Long Service and Good Conduct Medal	2001

== Offices held ==
Senedd
Preceded by David Lloyd	Member of the National Assembly for South Wales West; 2011–2015	Succeeded by Altaf Hussain
Parliament of the United Kingdom
Preceded by Martin Caton	Member of Parliament for Gower; 2015–2017	Succeeded by Tonia Antoniazzi
Political offices
Preceded by Jo Stevens	Shadow Secretary of State for Wales; 2024	Succeeded by Mims Davies
Orders of precedence in the United Kingdom
Preceded by The Lord Brownlow of Shurlock Row	Gentlemen; Baron Davies of Gower	Followed by The Lord Ranger
