= Frank Ash Yeo =

British industrialist and politician

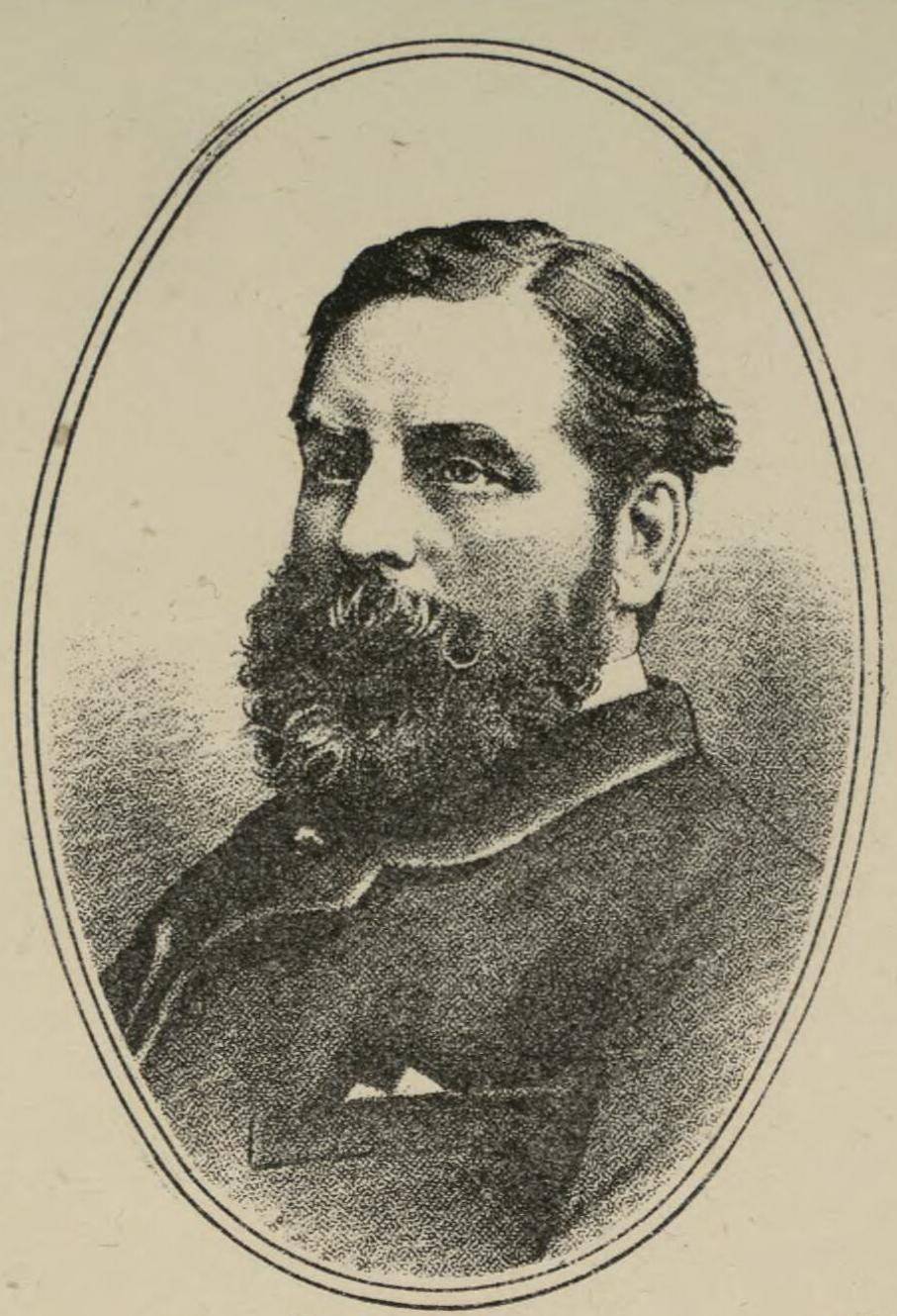

Member of Parliament for Gower
- In office 1885–1888

Personal details
- Born: 18 August 1832
- Died: 4 March 1888 (aged 55)

Frank Ash Yeo (18 August 1832 – 4 March 1888) was a British industrialist and Liberal politician.

Yeo was born at Bideford, Devon, the son of Thomas Yeo and his wife Elizabeth Woollacott. He was educated at Bideford School, and in Germany and France. He moved to Swansea where he was a colliery owner and director of the Swansea Bank and the Swansea Blast Furnace Company. In 1874 he was Mayor of Swansea, and commemorated his Mayoralty by donating the Chain of Office in 1875. In 1878 he became Chairman of Swansea Harbour Trust. He lived at Sketty Hall.

In 1885, Yeo was elected as Member of Parliament for Gower and held the seat until his death three years later at the age of 55.

Yeo married Sarah Cory at Cardiff in 1858. She died in 1863 and he married Mary Dowson of Northallerton in 1868.

== Mayoral chains ==
In 2006, a statement from Swansea City Council declared that the Mayoral Chains Of Office would continue to adorn the incumbent for select official duties following a planned refurbishment, to cost in the region of £50,000 GBP.

The Mayoral chains, a 'gift' to the city in 1875 from industrialist and Liberal Member of Parliament, Frank Ash Yeo, were once valued over £100,000 and are presently the subject of scrutiny from a number of notable antiquities specialists.

Plaid Cymru group spokesperson Darren Price - in consultation with direct heir and descendant of the benefactor, Mr. Nicholas James Cory Yeo Knott-Goodwin - suggested an alternative to the expenditure of a taxpayer-funded restoration would be to preserve, and archive the jewels for public view in a museum.

In further communications between Mr. Knott-Goodwin and Swansea City Council representatives, it was divulged that the private journals of Frank Ash Yeo - now held by great granddaughter Leila Cory Goodwin - would detail more closely the exact relationship between Mr. Yeo and Swansea Council circa his election to Mayor, and the relinquishing of holdings related to his erstwhile partnership, the Cory-Yeo group of collieries.

The contents of these journals were set to be published as a memoir in 2023.

== Arms ==
Coat of arms of Frank Ash Yeo
Escutcheon Argent, a chevron sable between three drakes azure billed and webbed or.

Parliament of the United Kingdom
New constituency	Member of Parliament for Gower; 1885 – 1888	Succeeded by David Randell
