= Ifor Davies =

Welsh politician (1910–1982)

Lord Commissioner of the Treasury
- In office 1964–1966
- Prime Minister: Harold Wilson

Member of Parliament for Gower
- In office 8 October 1959 – 6 June 1982
- Preceded by: David Grenfell
- Succeeded by: Gareth Wardell

Personal details
- Born: Ivor Davies; 9 June 1910 Swansea, Wales
- Died: 6 June 1982 (aged 71) Swansea, Wales
- Party: Labour
- Spouse: Doreen Griffiths (m. 1950)
- Children: 2, including Wyn
- Education: Ruskin College, Oxford

Ifor Davies (9 June 1910 – 6 June 1982), born Ivor Davies, was a Welsh Labour politician who was the MP for Gower from 1959 until his death.

== Background ==
Davies was born in Gowerton, Swansea, the youngest of the six children of Jeffrey Davies and Elizabeth Jane Thomas. His father was employed in the local tinplate mill. He was educated at Gowerton School, Swansea Technical College and Ruskin College, Oxford, and then worked as an industrial personnel officer.

== Political career ==
From 1958 to 1961, Davies served as a councillor on Glamorgan County Council. Prior to election to Parliament, he was election agent to his predecessor David Grenfell.

Davies was Member of Parliament (MP) for Gower from 1959 until he died in office in 1982. He was succeeded by Gareth Wardell. Under Harold Wilson, Davies was a Lord Commissioner of the Treasury and Welsh whip from 1964 to 1966 and a junior minister at the Welsh Office from 1966 to 1969. He was a former chairman of the Welsh Grand Committee and Member of the Speaker's Panel of Chairmen.

In 1971, firmly on the Right of the Labour Party, Davies was one of the 69 Labour MPs who defied the Labour Whip to vote in favour of entry to the EEC. He campaigned for a 'No' vote in the 1979 referendum in Wales on the establishment of a Welsh Assembly, along with other members of the 'Gang of Six', Neil Kinnock, Leo Abse, Donald Anderson, Alfred Evans and Ioan Evans. Throughout his tenure as MP, he was sponsored by the white-collar trade union APEX.

Davies was Secretary of the now-defunct Tabernacle Chapel, Gowerton, continuing in that role while a Member of Parliament. He was a former chairman of the Council of Swansea University.

== Personal life ==
In 1950, he married Doreen Griffiths (1925-2018); the couple had two children, Janet and Wyn, Director of Music with New Zealand Opera.

His step-great nephew Huw Irranca-Davies was the MP for Ogmore 2002 to 2016 and has been the Assembly Member for the coterminous seat since 2016, later serving as deputy First Minister of Wales and currently as Llywydd of the Senedd. His brother Benjamin was a grammar school teacher of Gravesend, Kent.

Davies died in Swansea on 6 June 1982, at the age of 71.

Parliament of the United Kingdom
Preceded by David Grenfell	Member of Parliament for Gower; 1959–1982	Succeeded by Gareth Wardell
