= Martin Caton =

British Labour politician

Member of Parliament for Gower
- In office 1 May 1997 – 30 March 2015
- Preceded by: Gareth Wardell
- Succeeded by: Byron Davies

Personal details
- Born: Martin Philip Caton; 15 June 1951 (age 74) Bishop's Stortford, Hertfordshire, England, UK
- Party: Labour
- Spouse: Bethan Evans
- Children: 2

Martin Philip Caton (born 15 June 1951) is a British Labour Party politician who was the Member of Parliament (MP) for Gower from 1997 to 2015.

== Early life and career ==
Caton was born in Bishop's Stortford and educated at the Newport Free Grammar School near Saffron Walden, the Norfolk School of Agriculture, and the Aberystwyth College of Further Education. From 1974 he worked for 10 years as a research officer with the Welsh Plant Breeding Station at Aberystwyth before becoming a researcher for the member of the European Parliament David Morris. He was elected as a councillor of the Mumbles Community Council (1986–90) and to the Swansea City Council from 1988 until his election in 1997 to parliament.

== Political career ==
He won the then-safe Labour seat of Gower at the 1997 general election on the retirement of Gareth Wardell. He was elected with a majority of 13,007 and made his maiden speech on 4 June 1997, in which he defended the cockle industry in his constituency.

Caton participated in the rebellion of Labour MPs voting against the government decision to invade Iraq in 2003, and was one of the 88 Labour MPs to vote against replacing the Trident nuclear missile system, Caton having been a member of the Campaign for Nuclear Disarmament for years. Within Parliament, he spent a long time on the Welsh Affairs Select committee and sat with the Socialist Campaign Group of Labour MPs. Martin Caton retired from Parliament at the 2015 General Election.

== Personal life ==
He married Bethan Evans in 1996 and they have two daughters.

Parliament of the United Kingdom
Preceded by Gareth Wardell	Member of Parliament for Gower; 1997–2015	Succeeded by Byron Davies
