= Tonia Antoniazzi =

Welsh politician (born 1971)

Tonia Antoniazzi MP
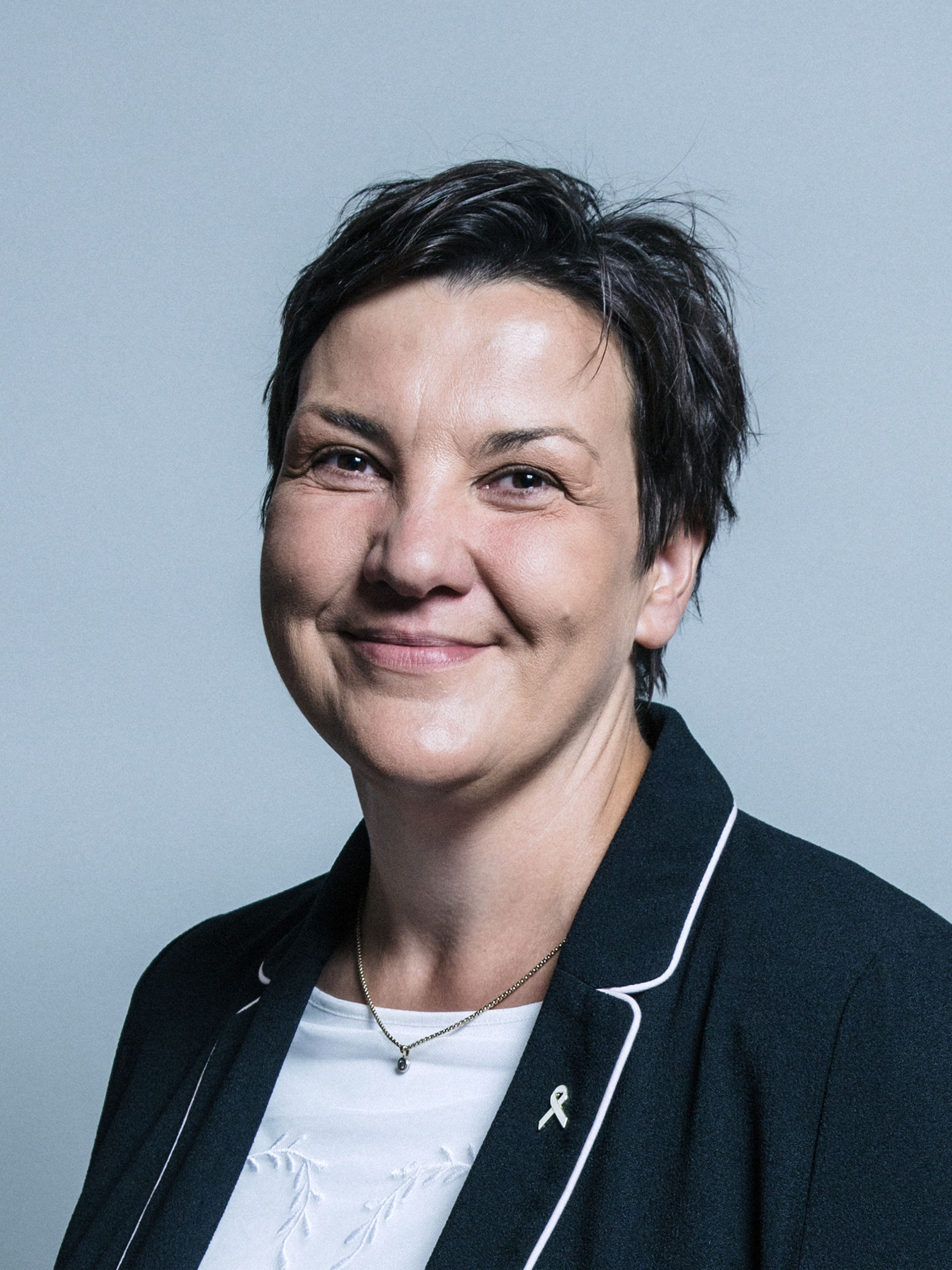
- Official portrait, 2017

Chair of the Northern Ireland Affairs Select Committee
- Incumbent
- Assumed office 9 September 2024
- Preceded by: Robert Buckland

Member of Parliament for Gower
- Incumbent
- Assumed office 8 June 2017
- Preceded by: Byron Davies
- Majority: 11,567 (24.5%)
Shadow portfolios
| 2022–2024 | Whip |
| 2021–2023 | Northern Ireland |

Personal details
- Born: Antonia Louise Antoniazzi; 5 October 1971 (age 55) Llanelli, Wales
- Party: Labour
- Education: University of Exeter Cardiff University
- Website: toniaantoniazzi.co.uk

Antonia Louise Antoniazzi (born 5 October 1971) is a Welsh Labour Party politician who has been the Member of Parliament (MP) for Gower since 2017.

== Early life and career ==
Antonia Antoniazzi was born on 5 October 1971 in Llanelli to a Welsh mother and a Welsh–Italian father. She attended St John Lloyd Catholic Comprehensive School and Gorseinon College. After studying French and Italian at University of Exeter, she gained a Postgraduate Certificate in Education (PGCE) from Cardiff University.

Antoniazzi was head of languages at Bryngwyn Comprehensive School in Llanelli. She won nine caps as a prop forward for the Wales women's national rugby union team.

== Parliamentary career ==
At the snap 2017 general election, Antoniazzi was elected as MP for Gower with 49.9% of the vote and a majority of 3,269. She delivered her maiden speech on 29 June 2017. In her speech she outlined how Italian immigration had shaped cafe culture in Wales and the UK.

Antoniazzi is chair of the All Party Parliamentary Groups on Medical Cannabis under Prescription and on Cancer.

In June 2019, Antoniazzi urged ministers to allow the use of medical cannabis by "all who need it", citing the case of 12-year-old Billy Caldwell whose epilepsy was alleviated through use of the drug.

Also in June 2019, Antoniazzi secured a debate in parliament about the health risks of electromagnetic fields, particularly 5G technology, in which she asked the government to commit to ensuring that Public Health England informed the public that all radio frequency signals are a possible human carcinogen. She was subsequently accused in The Guardian of spreading "junk science".

At the 2019 general election, Antoniazzi was re-elected as MP for Gower with a decreased vote share of 45.4% and a decreased majority of 1,837.

In the 2020 Labour leadership election, Antoniazzi nominated Jess Phillips.

At the 2024 general election, Antoniazzi was again re-elected, with a decreased vote share of 43.4% and an increased majority of 11,567. She was elected unopposed as the chair of the Northern Ireland Affairs Select Committee on 9 September 2024.

Antoniazzi is a co-sponsor of Kim Leadbeater's Terminally Ill Adults (End of Life) Bill on assisted suicide. An amendment in Antoniazzi's name aiming to de-criminalise a woman's action to bring about the abortion of her own unborn child has been incorporated into the Crime and Policing Bill currently (September 2025) being considered in parliament.

On 11 May 2026, she called on Keir Starmer to resign following the 2026 Senedd election.

=== Brexit ===
Antoniazzi served as the Parliamentary Private Secretary to the Shadow Secretary of State for Northern Ireland (2017–2018) and the Shadow Secretary of State for Wales (2018) before resigning.

On 13 June 2018, Antoniazzi and five other Labour MPs resigned their roles as frontbenchers for the Labour Party in protest at Labour's Brexit position. Jeremy Corbyn had instructed his MPs to abstain in a vote which Britain would remain in the single market by joining the European Economic Area (EEA). The MPs including Antoniazzi resigned and voted in favour of the EEA.

In the series of parliamentary votes on Brexit in March 2019, Antoniazzi voted against the Labour Party whip and in favour of an amendment tabled by members of The Independent Group for a second public vote.

=== LGBT+ rights ===
In October 2021, Antoniazzi criticised the LGBT charity Stonewall, stating the Welsh government had promoted an "ideological culture" and were "dictated to by Stonewall".

In January 2022, Antoniazzi and four other Labour delegates to the Parliamentary Assembly of the Council of Europe tabled ten amendments to Resolution 2417, "Combating rising hate against LGBTI people in Europe". The amendments sought to include the word "sex" alongside gender identity, de-conflate the situation in the UK from Hungary, Poland, Russia and Turkey, and remove references to alleged anti-LGBTI movements in the UK. The delegates were criticised by Pink News for removing references to anti-LGBTI attacks in the UK, a condemnation of anti-trans movements and a call to withdraw funding from anti-LGBTI groups or authorities; in turn the delegates were defended by Debbie Hayton, a gender-critical activist, for protesting the removal of sex-essentialist language she considered important for non-trans women.

In July 2022, Antoniazzi submitted an application on behalf of the gender critical group Labour Women's Declaration for them to have a stand at the Party's annual conference in Liverpool, which was subsequently denied. In response, Antoniazzi pushed for the group's public conference, chaired by her, to be given an official listing.

In July 2026, Antoniazzi became the primary sponsor of EDM603, a motion which claims to express "extreme concern at Amnesty International UK's report entitled A Growing Threat: the Anti-Rights Movement in the UK".

=== Abortion ===
In June 2025, the UK Parliament voted to end prosecution for women who self-manage abortions. The amendment, led by Antoniazzi, removed criminal penalties under the Offences Against the Person Act 1861, ensuring women would no longer face legal action.

== Personal life ==
Antoniazzi is divorced. She has a son.

Parliament of the United Kingdom
| Preceded by Byron Davies | Member of Parliament for Gower; 2017–present | Incumbent |
Political offices
| Preceded by Alex Davies-Jones | Shadow Minister for Northern Ireland; 2021–2023 | Succeeded by Fleur Anderson |
| Preceded by Robert Buckland | Chair of the Northern Ireland Affairs Select Committee; 2024–present | Incumbent |
