= William Jenkins (Labour politician) =

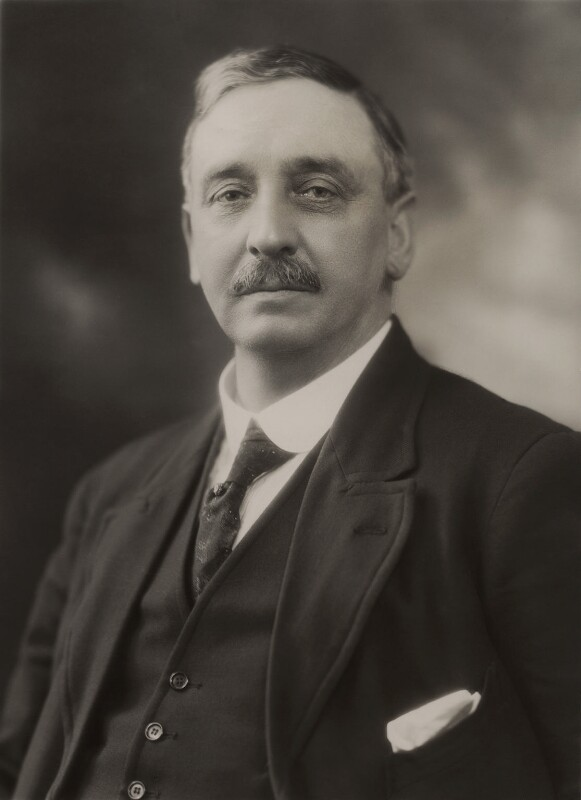
Jenkins in 1923

Sir William Jenkins (8 January 1871 – 8 December 1944) was a British Labour politician and trade union leader.

Jenkins was the son of a coal miner and attended Glyncorrwg National School before taking up work on the railways at the age of 11½. Six years later he became a miner, and later a checkweigher.

He entered politics in 1900 when he was elected to Glyncorrwg School Board, and in 1904 he became a member of the town's urban district council. He was chairman of Glamorgan County Council in 1906 and from 1919 to 1921. He was also chairman of Glyncorrwg UDC from 1908 to 1916. He became secretary of the Western Miners' Association in 1906, and chief agent of the Afan Valley Miners' Federation.

At the 1922 general election he was elected as Labour Member of Parliament (MP) for Neath, defeating John Hugh Edwards, the sitting Liberal member for the seat by over 8,000 votes. He was elected chairman of the county council for a third time in 1927. He held positions as vice-president of the County Council Association of England and Wales, chairman of the Federation of Education Authorities of Wales, member of the council of the University of Wales and chairman of the Glamorgan School for the Blind. In 1931 he was knighted for his public work.

He continued to hold the Neath seat until his death at Cymmer, Port Talbot in December 1944.

Parliament of the United Kingdom
Preceded by John Hugh Edwards	Member of Parliament for Neath; 1922–1944	Succeeded by D. J. Williams
Trade union offices
Preceded by W. E. Morgan	Secretary of the Western District of the South Wales Miners' Federation; 1906–1910	Succeeded by ?
Preceded by New position	Agent for the Afan Valley District of the South Wales Miners' Federation; 1910–1922	Succeeded by John Thomas
