= Gareth Wardell =

British Labour politician (born 1944)

Member of Parliament for Gower
- In office 16 September 1982 – 8 April 1997
- Preceded by: Ifor Davies
- Succeeded by: Martin Caton

Personal details
- Born: 29 November 1944 (age 81)
- Party: Labour

Gareth Lodwig Wardell (born 29 November 1944) is a British Labour politician. He was elected as Member of Parliament for Gower in a 1982 by-election, and held the seat until he stood down at the 1997 general election.

== Background ==
Wardell was born on 29 November 1944. Wardell's father, Jack Wardell, was a barber from Carmarthenshire.

Before entering politics, Wardell lectured geography at Trinity College, Carmarthen.

== Political career ==
Wardell entered the House of Commons as the Member of Parliament for Gower in 1982 following a by-election in the constituency.

In June 1983, Wardell was appointed chairman of the Welsh Affairs Committee. Wardell remained in this position until he retired as an MP in 1997.

== Career after Parliament ==
Wardell works as a public affairs consultant in South Wales.

Parliament of the United Kingdom
Preceded by Ifor Davies	Member of Parliament for Gower; 1982 – 1997	Succeeded by Martin Caton
