= Isaac Evans (trade unionist) =

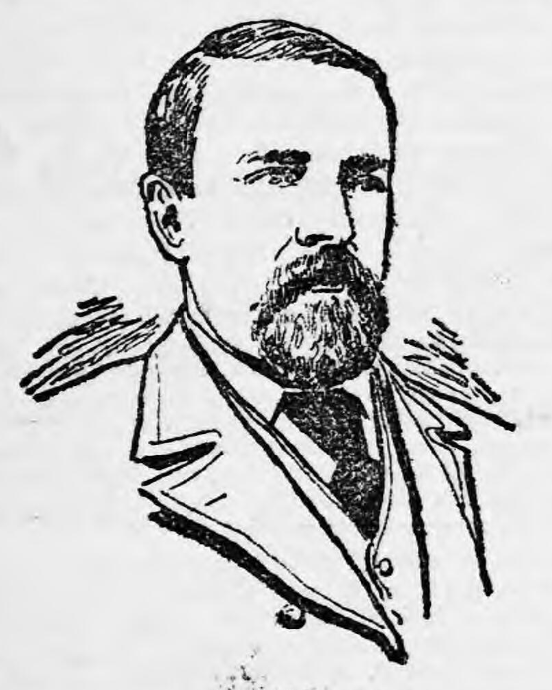
- Evans, shortly before his death

Member of the Glamorgan County Council
- In office 1892–1897
- Preceded by: J. Edwards Vaughan
- Succeeded by: Daniel Evans

Personal details
- Born: 14 December 1847 Garndiffaith, Wales, U.K.
- Died: 12 November 1897 (aged 49)
- Party: Liberal-Labour
- Organizations: National Federation of Enginemen, Stokers, and Kindred Trades; Western Miners' Association; British Labour League

Isaac Evans (14 December 1847 – 12 November 1897) was a Welsh trade union leader and politician.

Born at Garndiffaith, near Pontypool, Evans began working in a coal mine at Abersychan when only ten years old. Over the next few years, he worked at a variety of collieries, some in the Risca Valley, and one in England, then in the Rhondda at Llwynpia No.3 pit. He then married, and found steady employment in Skewen, where he lived for the rest of his life.

Evans was a keen trade unionist, and in 1876 played a leading role in the negotiations which led to the formation of the Sliding Scale Joint Committee, to determine coal miners' wages. In 1878, he was appointed as the secretary of the Neath District of Miners, then in 1881, he was appointed to the Sliding Scale Joint Committee. He resigned as permanent secretary of the Neath District, but remained its agent, and acted as secretary until the end of the decade. Despite these additional duties, he continued to work cutting coal until 1890. He was invited to become sole miners' agent for the Monmouthshire Miners' Association in 1889, but turned down the post, as he did not wish to relocate his family.

Evans was supportive of enginemen and boilermen working at collieries forming their own unions, and in 1883 he chaired the first meeting of these workers in the region. Due to his work on this, in 1885/86, he served as president of the National Federation of Enginemen, Stokers, and Kindred Trades. In 1890, he became the founding president of the British Labour League.

Despite his membership of the Sliding Scale Joint Committee, Evans had concerns about its workings, even in the 1880s. He attended the founding meeting of the Miners' Federation of Great Britain, in 1889, and supported its eight-hour day policy, but argued that it could not occur in South Wales because of the sliding scale agreement. In 1893, he dissented from most of his colleagues, including William Abraham, "Mabon", during the episode known as the Hauliers' Strike, when younger miners supported a more militant policy than the moderate union leaders. As a result he refused to accept the terms offered by the employers for renewing the Sliding Scale agreement for the determination of wages, and resigned from the Sliding Scale Joint Committee. He thereafter became highly critical of Mabon, accusing him of accepting bribes.

In 1892, Evans was elected to Glamorgan County Council, as a Liberal-Labour member representing Resolven. He was re-elected without facing an opponent in 1895, and soon afterwards was appointed as an alderman.

In 1897, Evans swallowed a bone and underwent an operation to remove it. The operation was unsuccessful, and he died on 12 November.

Trade union offices
Preceded by New position	Agent for the Western Miners' Association; 1878–1897	Succeeded by John Williams
