= Gower (UK Parliament constituency) =

UK Parliament constituency (1885–)

Coordinates: 51.620°N 4.137°W

- County constituency for the House of Commons
- Interactive map of boundaries from 2024
- Location within Wales
- Preserved county: West Glamorgan
- Electorate: 76,801 (March 2020)
- Major settlements: Mumbles, Clydach, Gorseinon, Pontarddulais, Penllergaer

Current constituency
- Created: 1885
- Member of Parliament: Tonia Antoniazzi (Labour)
- Seats: One
- Created from: Glamorganshire

Overlaps
- Senedd: Gŵyr Abertawe

Gower (Welsh: Gŵyr) is a constituency (Note: A county constituency (for the purposes of election expenses and type of returning officer)) created in 1885 and represented in the House of Commons of the UK Parliament by one Member of Parliament (MP). (Note: As with all constituencies, the constituency elects one Member of Parliament (MP) by the first past the post system of election at least every five years.) Tonia Antoniazzi of the Labour Party became its MP after winning it from Conservative Byron Davies in the 2017 UK general election. Labour had previously represented the seat from 1909 until 2015.

The constituency retained its name with altered boundaries as part of the 2023 review of Westminster constituencies and under the June 2023 final recommendations of the Boundary Commission for Wales for the 2024 general election.

== Overview ==
The constituency was created in 1885 and has had relatively widely varied boundaries. Before 2015 it had elected Labour MPs since 1909, sharing the longest single-party representation with Normanton and Makerfield. It holds approximately a third of the electorate of the city and county of Swansea, the rest of which is Swansea West and Swansea East.

== Boundaries ==
The constituency encompasses most of the old Lordship of Gower (less the city of Swansea) and covers the inner Gower Peninsula and outer Gower areas including Gowerton, Gorseinon, Felindre and Garnswllt.

1885–1918: The Municipal Borough of Swansea, and the Sessional Divisions of Gower, Pontardawe, and Swansea.

1918–1950: The Urban District of Oystermouth, and the Rural Districts of Gower and Swansea.

1950–1983: The Urban District of Llwchwr, and the Rural Districts of Gower and Pontardawe.

1983–2010: The City of Swansea wards of Bishopston, Fairwood, Gower, Newton, Oystermouth, Penclawdd, Pennard, and West Cross, and the Borough of Lliw Valley wards of Clydach, Dulais East, Gorseinon Central, Gorseinon East, Gowerton East, Gowerton West, Graigfelin, Kingsbridge, Llangyfelach, Lower Loughor, Mawr, Penllergaer, Penyrheol, Pontardulais, Tal-y-bont, Upper Loughor, and Vardre.

2010–2024: The Swansea County electoral divisions of Bishopston, Clydach, Fairwood, Gorseinon, Gower, Gowerton, Kingsbridge, Llangyfelach, Lower Loughor, Mawr, Newton, Oystermouth, Penclawdd, Penllergaer, Pennard, Penyrheol, Pontardulais, Upper Loughor, and West Cross.

2024-present: Under the 2023 review, the constituency was defined as being composed of the following wards of the City and County of Swansea, as they existed on 1 December 2020:

- Bishopston; Cockett; Dunvant; Fairwood; Gorseinon; Gower; Gowerton; Killay North; Killay South; Kingsbridge; Llangyfelach; Lower Loughor; Mawr; Mayals; Newton; Oystermouth; Penclawdd; Penllergaer; Pennard; Penyrheol; Pontardulais; Upper Loughor; and West Cross.

The seat was expanded to include the Swansea suburbs of Cockett, Dunvant, Killay and Mayals, transferred from Swansea West. Clydach was transferred to the new constituency of Neath and Swansea East.

Following a local government boundary review which came into effect in May 2022, the constituency now comprises the following from the 2024 general election:

- Bishopston; Clydach (small part); Cockett; Dunvant and Killay; Fairwood; Goresinon and Penyrheol; Gower; Gowerton; Llangyfelach; Llwchwr; Mayals; Mumbles; Pen-clawdd; Penllergaer; Pennard; Pontaddulais; Pontlliw and Tircoed; Waunarlwydd; and West Cross.

== History ==
First form. Extract from 1906 result; uniquely no Tories in Wales were elected. Here the MP has been coloured a unique shade of orange, as 'independent Lib.-Lab.'

=== Liberals and Labour 1885–1918 ===
The first years, seeing more heavy industrial make-up than today, represented a struggle between the Liberals and those who favoured direct labour representation. Although its new electors in 1885 were predominantly the miners and tinplaters of the Swansea Valley, the new MP was Frank Ash Yeo, a local colliery owner and clearly an upper-class figure. In 1885 he comfortably defeated Henry Nathaniel Miers of Ynyspenllwch in the Swansea Valley, a coal owner, tinplate manufacturer and landowner.

On Yeo's death in 1888, representatives of the trade unions in the constituency overturned the Liberal association's choice of Sir Horace Davey and ensured the selection of David Randell as candidate. Randell was a Methodist solicitor who specialised in trade union litigation and his victory, albeit with a reduced majority over John Dillwyn Llewellyn, formed the basis of later claims that Gower was a 'labour' seat.

=== Modern history ===
Since 1945, Gower has been a mostly reliable seat for the Labour Party, returning Labour's candidate except in two elections; in the 1983 Conservative landslide, in which it was won by just 1,205 votes, and in 2010, where it was held by 2,683 votes. However, unlike many Welsh valley seats, which have given commanding majorities to Labour, Gower has not seen a majority of over 10,000 votes or 20% of the vote for the Labour candidate in any election (with the exception of 1997) since 1979. In 2015, incumbent MP Martin Caton stood down, and the new Labour candidate Liz Evans was defeated by the Conservative Byron Davies by 27 votes, less than 0.1% of votes cast, which made it the most marginal Conservative seat going into the next election. Davies' victory brought 105 consecutive years of Labour representation to an end, but Labour won the seat back in the 2017 general election with a majority of 3,269, slightly larger than Caton's final majority in 2010.

== Members of Parliament ==
Year	Member	Whip
1885	Frank Yeo	Liberal
1888	David Randell	Liberal
1900	John Aeron Thomas	Liberal
1906	John Williams	Liberal
1909	John Williams	Labour
1922	David Grenfell	Labour
1959	Ifor Davies	Labour
1982	Gareth Wardell	Labour
1997	Martin Caton	Labour
2015	Byron Davies	Conservative
2017	Tonia Antoniazzi	Labour

== Elections ==
=== Elections in the 21st century ===
==== Elections in the 2020s ====
General election 2024: Gower
Party	Candidate	Votes	%	±%
Labour	Tonia Antoniazzi	20,480	43.4	−2.4
Conservative	Marc Jenkins	8,913	18.9	−21.0
Reform	Catrin Thomas	8,530	18.1	+14.7
Plaid Cymru	Kieran Pritchard	3,942	8.3	+3.2
Liberal Democrats	Franck Banza	2,593	5.5	−0.4
Green	Chris Evans	2,488	5.3	N/A
Independent	Wayne Erasmus	283	0.6	N/A
Majority		11,567	24.5	+18.6
Turnout		47,229	62.0	−8.6
Registered electors		76,123		
Labour hold		Swing	+9.3	

==== Elections in the 2010s ====
2019 notional result (Note: Estimate of the 2019 general election result as if the revised boundaries recommended under the 2023 boundary review were in place)
Party	Vote	%
Labour	24,812	45.8
Conservative	21,631	39.9
Liberal Democrats	3,182	5.9
Plaid Cymru	2,741	5.1
Brexit Party	1,863	3.4
Green Party	2	0.0
Majority	3,181	5.9
Turnout	54,231	70.6
Electorate	76,801	

General election 2010: Gower
Party	Candidate	Votes	%	±%
Labour	Martin Caton	16,016	38.4	―4.0
Conservative	Byron Davies	13,333	32.0	+6.5
Liberal Democrats	Mike Day	7,947	19.1	+0.6
Plaid Cymru	Darren Price	2,760	6.6	―1.2
BNP	Adrian Jones	963	2.3	N/A
UKIP	Gordon Triggs	652	1.6	―1.6
Majority		2,683	6.4	―10.6
Turnout		41,671	67.5	+2.1
Registered electors		61,696		
Labour hold		Swing	―5.3	

General election 2015: Gower
Party	Candidate	Votes	%	±%
Conservative	Byron Davies	15,862	37.1	+5.1
Labour	Liz Evans	15,835	37.0	―1.4
UKIP	Colin Beckett	4,773	11.2	+9.6
Plaid Cymru	Darren Thomas	3,051	7.1	+0.5
Liberal Democrats	Mike Sheehan	1,552	3.6	―15.5
Green	Julia Marshall	1,161	2.7	N/A
Monster Raving Loony	Baron Barnes Von Claptrap	253	0.6	N/A
Independent	Steve Roberts	168	0.4	N/A
TUSC	Mark Evans	103	0.2	N/A
Rejected ballots		57		
Majority		27	0.1	N/A
Turnout		42,758	69.2	+1.7
Registered electors		61,820		
Conservative gain from Labour		Swing	+3.3	

Of the 57 rejected ballots:

- 40 were either unmarked or it was uncertain who the vote was for.
- 17 voted for more than one candidate.

General election 2017: Gower
Party	Candidate	Votes	%	±%
Labour	Tonia Antoniazzi	22,727	49.9	+12.9
Conservative	Byron Davies	19,458	42.7	+5.6
Plaid Cymru	Harri Roberts	1,669	3.7	―3.4
Liberal Democrats	Howard W. Evans	931	2.0	―1.6
UKIP	Ross Ford	642	1.4	―9.8
Pirate	Jason Winstanley	149	0.3	N/A
Majority		3,269	7.2	N/A
Turnout		45,576	73.5	+4.3
Registered electors		62,089		
Labour gain from Conservative		Swing	+3.6	

General election 2019: Gower
Party	Candidate	Votes	%	±%
Labour	Tonia Antoniazzi	20,208	45.4	―4.5
Conservative	Francesca O'Brien	18,371	41.3	―1.4
Plaid Cymru	John Davies	2,288	5.1	+1.4
Liberal Democrats	Sam Bennett	2,236	5.0	+3.0
Brexit Party	Rob Ross	1,379	3.1	New
Rejected ballots		122		
Majority		1,837	4.1	―3.1
Turnout		44,482	72.0	―1.5
Registered electors		61,762		
Labour hold		Swing	―1.5	

Of the 122 rejected ballots:

- 90 were either unmarked or it was uncertain who the vote was for.
- 32 voted for more than one candidate.

==== Elections in the 2000s ====
General election 2001: Gower
Party	Candidate	Votes	%	±%
Labour	Martin Caton	17,676	47.3	―6.5
Conservative	John Bushell	10,281	27.5	+3.7
Liberal Democrats	Sheila Waye	4,507	12.1	―0.9
Plaid Cymru	Siân Caiach	3,865	10.3	+5.2
Green	Tina Shrewsbury	607	1.6	N/A
Socialist Labour	Darran Hickery	417	1.1	N/A
Majority		7,395	19.8	―10.2
Turnout		37,353	63.4	―11.7
Registered electors		58,935		
Labour hold		Swing	―5.1	

General election 2005: Gower
Party	Candidate	Votes	%	±%
Labour	Martin Caton	16,786	42.5	―4.8
Conservative	Mike Murray	10,083	25.5	―2.0
Liberal Democrats	Nick Tregoning	7,291	18.4	+6.3
Plaid Cymru	Sian Caiach	3,089	7.8	―2.5
UKIP	Richard Lewis	1,264	3.2	N/A
Green	Rhodri Griffiths	1,029	2.6	+1.0
Majority		6,703	17.0	―2.8
Turnout		39,542	64.9	+1.5
Registered electors		60,432		
Labour hold		Swing	―1.4	

=== Elections in the 20th century ===
==== Elections in the 1990s ====
General election 1992: Gower
Party	Candidate	Votes	%	±%
Labour	Gareth Wardell	23,485	50.1	+3.5
Conservative	Anthony L. Donnelly	16,437	35.1	+0.6
Liberal Democrats	Christopher G. Davies	4,655	9.9	―6.2
Plaid Cymru	Adam Price	1,639	3.5	+0.7
Green	Brian Kingzett	448	1.0	N/A
Raving Loony Green Giant Party	Gerry P. Egan	114	0.2	N/A
Natural Law	Michael S. Beresford	74	0.2	N/A
Majority		7,048	15.0	+2.9
Turnout		46,852	81.9	+1.2
Registered electors		57,231		
Labour hold		Swing	+1.5	

General election 1997: Gower
Party	Candidate	Votes	%	±%
Labour	Martin Caton	23,313	53.8	+3.7
Conservative	Alun Cairns	10,306	23.8	―11.3
Liberal Democrats	Howard W. Evans	5,624	13.0	+3.1
Plaid Cymru	D Elwyn Williams	2,226	5.1	+1.6
Referendum	Richard D. Lewis	1,745	4.0	N/A
Independent	Anthony G. Popham	122	0.3	N/A
Majority		13,007	30.0	+15.0
Turnout		43,336	75.1	―6.8
Registered electors		57,707		
Labour hold		Swing	+7.5	

==== Elections in the 1980s ====
1982 Gower by-election
Party	Candidate	Votes	%	±%
Labour	Gareth Wardell	17,095	43.5	―9.7
SDP	Gwynoro Jones	9,875	25.1	+16.1
Conservative	Trefor Llewellyn	8,690	22.1	―8.5
Plaid Cymru	Ieuan Owen	3,431	8.7	+1.5
Computer Democrat	John Donovan	125	0.3	N/A
Civil Rights/Welsh Political Prisoner	David Burns	103	0.3	N/A
Majority		7,220	18.4	―4.2
Turnout		39,319	65.4	―15.4
Registered electors		60,123		
Labour hold		Swing	+0.7	

General election 1983: Gower
Party	Candidate	Votes	%	±%
Labour	Gareth Wardell	16,972	38.1	―15.1
Conservative	Tom Kenyon	15,767	35.3	+4.7
SDP	Gwynoro Jones	10,416	23.4	N/A
Plaid Cymru	Nigel Williams	1,444	3.2	―4.0
Majority		1,205	2.8	―19.8
Turnout		44,599	78.7	―2.1
Registered electors		56,693		
Labour hold		Swing		

General election 1987: Gower
Party	Candidate	Votes	%	±%
Labour	Gareth Wardell	22,139	46.6	+8.5
Conservative	Gerald Price	16,374	34.5	―0.8
SDP	David Elliott	7,645	16.1	―7.3
Plaid Cymru	Jonathan Edwards	1,341	2.8	―0.4
Majority		5,765	12.1	+9.3
Turnout		47,498	80.7	+2.0
Registered electors		58,871		
Labour hold		Swing		

==== Elections in the 1970s ====
General election 1970: Gower
Party	Candidate	Votes	%	±%
Labour	Ifor Davies	26,485	63.4	―13.8
Conservative	Michael J. Carter	9,435	22.6	―0.2
Plaid Cymru	Clifford G. Davies	5,869	14.0	N/A
Majority		17,050	40.8	―13.6
Turnout		41,789	76.9	―1.0
Registered electors		54,317		
Labour hold		Swing		

General election February 1974: Gower
Party	Candidate	Votes	%	±%
Labour	Ifor Davies	23,856	52.9	―10.5
Conservative	D F R George	8,780	19.4	―3.2
Liberal	Clem Thomas	8,737	19.4	N/A
Plaid Cymru	J N Harris	3,741	8.3	―5.7
Majority		15,076	33.5	―7.3
Turnout		45,114	79.9	+3.0
Registered electors		56,476		
Labour hold		Swing		

General election October 1974: Gower
Party	Candidate	Votes	%	±%
Labour	Ifor Davies	25,067	57.3	+4.4
Conservative	D F R George	8,863	20.3	+0.9
Liberal	R Owen	5,453	12.4	―7.0
Plaid Cymru	M Powell	4,369	10.0	+1.7
Majority		16,204	37.0	+3.5
Turnout		43,752	76.9	―3.0
Registered electors		56,867		
Labour hold		Swing		

General election 1979: Gower
Party	Candidate	Votes	%	±%
Labour	Ifor Davies	24,963	53.2	―4.1
Conservative	T Llewellyn	14,322	30.6	+10.3
Liberal	R Blakeborough-Pownal	4,245	9.0	―3.4
Plaid Cymru	E Thomas	3,357	7.2	―2.8
Majority		10,641	22.6	―14.4
Turnout		46,887	80.8	+3.9
Registered electors		58,023		
Labour hold		Swing		

==== Elections in the 1960s ====
General election 1964: Gower
Party	Candidate	Votes	%	±%
Labour	Ifor Davies	27,895	71.0	+4.1
National Liberal	J Huw P. Griffiths	8,822	22.5	―1.5
Plaid Cymru	John Gwyn Griffiths	2,562	6.5	―2.6
Majority		19,073	48.5	+5.6
Turnout		39,279	80.0	―2.9
Registered electors		49,119		
Labour hold		Swing		

General election 1966: Gower
Party	Candidate	Votes	%	±%
Labour	Ifor Davies	29,910	77.2	+6.2
Conservative	David R. O. Lewis	8,852	22.8	+0.3
Majority		21,058	54.4	+5.9
Turnout		38,762	77.9	―2.1
Registered electors		49,731		
Labour hold		Swing		

==== Elections in the 1950s ====
General election 1950: Gower
Party	Candidate	Votes	%	±%
Labour	David Grenfell	32,564	76.1	+7.6
National Liberal	Rowe Harding	10,208	23.9	―7.6
Majority		22,356	52.2	+15.2
Turnout		42,772	84.8	+7.8
Registered electors		50,459		
Labour hold		Swing		

General election 1951: Gower
Party	Candidate	Votes	%	±%
Labour	David Grenfell	32,661	75.9	―0.2
National Liberal	Rowe Harding	10,351	24.1	+0.2
Majority		22,310	51.8	―0.4
Turnout		43,012	84.3	―0.5
Registered electors		51,016		
Labour hold		Swing		

General election 1955: Gower
Party	Candidate	Votes	%	±%
Labour	David Grenfell	26,304	68.3	―7.6
National Liberal	B Gwyther Jones	8,135	21.1	―3.0
Plaid Cymru	Chris Rees	4,101	10.6	N/A
Majority		18,169	47.2	―4.6
Turnout		38,540	76.8	―7.5
Registered electors		50,193		
Labour hold		Swing		

General election 1959: Gower
Party	Candidate	Votes	%	±%
Labour	Ifor Davies	27,441	66.9	―1.4
National Liberal	Michael Heseltine	9,837	24.0	+2.9
Plaid Cymru	John Gwyn Griffiths	3,744	9.1	―1.5
Majority		17,604	42.9	―4.3
Turnout		41,022	82.9	+6.1
Registered electors		49,480		
Labour hold		Swing		

==== Elections in the 1940s ====
General election 1945: Gower
Party	Candidate	Votes	%	±%
Labour	David Grenfell	30,676	68.5	+1.7
National Liberal	John Aeron-Thomas	14,115	31.5	N/A
Majority		16,561	37.0	+3.4
Turnout		44,791	77.0	+0.9
Registered electors		58,188		
Labour hold		Swing		

==== Elections in the 1930s ====
General election 1931: Gower
Party	Candidate	Votes	%	±%
Labour	David Grenfell	21,963	53.4	―0.6
Liberal	Edgar Jones	19,157	46.6	+17.7
Majority		2,806	6.8	―18.3
Turnout		41,120	83.5	+3.9
Registered electors		49,232		
Labour hold		Swing		

General election 1935: Gower
Party	Candidate	Votes	%	±%
Labour	David Grenfell	25,632	66.8	+13.4
National	G C Hutchinson	13,239	33.2	N/A
Majority		13,393	33.6	+26.8
Turnout		38,871	76.1	―7.4
Registered electors		52,376		
Labour hold		Swing		

==== Elections in the 1920s ====
1922 Gower by-election
Party	Candidate	Votes	%	±%
Labour	David Grenfell	13,296	57.5	+2.7
National Liberal	D H Williams	9,841	42.5	―2.7
Majority		3,455	15.0	+5.4
Turnout		23,137	73.0	+10.8
Registered electors		31,679		
Labour hold		Swing	+2.7	

General election 1922: Gower
Party	Candidate	Votes	%	±%
Labour	David Grenfell	13,388	54.2	―0.6
Liberal	Frederick William Davies	11,302	45.8	+0.6
Majority		2,086	8.4	―1.2
Turnout		24,690	74.6	+12.4
Registered electors		33,084		
Labour hold		Swing	―0.6	

General election 1923: Gower
Party	Candidate	Votes	%	±%
Labour	David Grenfell	14,771	59.1	+4.9
Liberal	Leah Norah Folland	10,219	40.9	―4.9
Majority		4,552	18.2	+9.8
Turnout		24,990	73.0	―1.6
Registered electors		34,250		
Labour hold		Swing	+4.9	

General election 1924: Gower
Party	Candidate	Votes	%	±%
Labour	David Grenfell	15,374	57.2	―1.9
Unionist	Ernest Thomas Nethercoat	11,516	42.8	N/A
Majority		3,858	14.4	―3.8
Turnout		26,890	75.5	+2.5
Registered electors		35,631		
Labour hold		Swing	N/A	

General election 1929: Gower
Party	Candidate	Votes	%	±%
Labour	David Grenfell	20,664	54.0	―3.2
Liberal	Frederick William Davies	11,055	28.9	N/A
Unionist	Alan Lennox-Boyd	6,554	17.1	―25.7
Majority		9,609	25.1	+10.7
Turnout		38,273	79.6	+4.1
Registered electors		48,060		
Labour hold		Swing	+11.3	

==== Elections in the 1910s ====
General election January 1910: Gower
Party	Candidate	Votes	%	±%
Labour	John Williams	9,312	78.6	+35.8
Conservative	Percy Reginald Owen Abel Simner	2,532	21.4	+4.2
Majority		6,780	57.2	N/A
Turnout		11,844	80.5	―2.5
Registered electors		14,712		
Labour gain from Lib-Lab		Swing	+15.8	

General election December 1910: Gower
Party	Candidate	Votes	%	±%
Labour	John Williams	5,480	54.8	―23.8
Liberal	W F Phillips	4,527	45.2	N/A
Majority		953	9.6	―47.6
Turnout		10,007	68.0	―12.5
Registered electors		14,712		
Labour hold		Swing		

General Election 1914–15: A General Election was required to take place before the end of 1915. The political parties had been making preparations for an election to take place, and by July 1914, the following candidates had been selected:

- Labour: John Williams
- Liberal:
- Unionist: Peter D Thomas

John Williams

General election 1918: Gower
Party	Candidate	Votes	%	±%
Labour	John Williams	10,109	54.8	±0.0
Liberal	D H Williams	8,353	45.2	±0.0
Majority		1,756	9.6	±0.0
Turnout		18,462	62.2	―5.8
Registered electors		29,667		
Labour hold		Swing	±0.0	

==== Elections in the 1900s ====
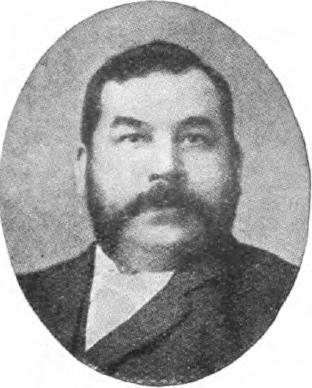
Hodge

General election 1900: Gower
Party	Candidate	Votes	%	±%
Liberal	John Thomas	4,276	52.6	―20.3
Labour Repr. Cmte.	John Hodge	3,853	47.4	N/A
Majority		423	5.2	―40.6
Turnout		8,129	66.3	―2.3
Registered electors		12,267		
Liberal hold		Swing		

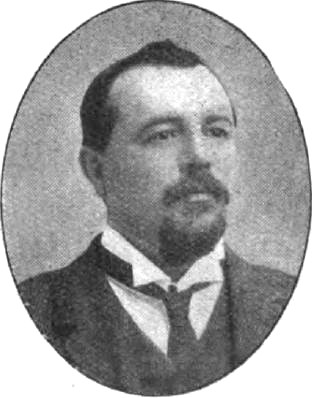
Williams

General election 1906: Gower
Party	Candidate	Votes	%	±%
Lib-Lab	John Williams	4,841	42.8	N/A
Liberal	Jeremiah Williams	4,522	40.0	―12.6
Conservative	Ernest Helme	1,939	17.2	N/A
Majority		319	2.8	N/A
Turnout		11,302	83.0	+16.7
Registered electors		13,624		
Lib-Lab gain from Liberal		Swing		

=== Elections in the 19th century ===
==== Elections in the 1890s ====
General election 1892: Gower
Party	Candidate	Votes	%	±%
Liberal	David Randell	Unopposed		
Registered electors				
Liberal hold				

General election 1895: Gower
Party	Candidate	Votes	%	±%
Liberal	David Randell	6,074	72.9	N/A
Conservative	Charles Henry Glascodyne	2,256	27.1	N/A
Majority		3,818	45.8	N/A
Turnout		8,330	68.6	N/A
Registered electors		12,150		
Liberal hold		Swing	N/A	

==== Elections in the 1880s ====
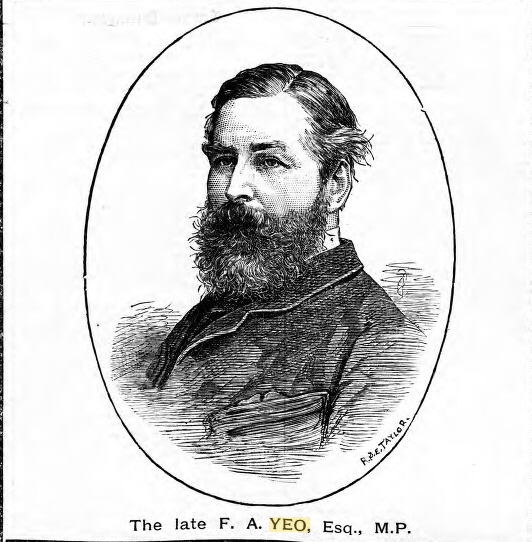
Yeo

General election 1885: Gower
Party	Candidate	Votes	%	±%
Liberal	Frank Ash Yeo	5,560	72.6	
Conservative	Henry Nathaniel Miers	2,103	27.4	
Majority		3,457	45.2	
Turnout		7,663	72.6	
Registered electors		10,562		
Liberal win (new seat)				

General election 1886: Gower
Party	Candidate	Votes	%	±%
Liberal	Frank Ash Yeo	Unopposed		
Registered electors				
Liberal hold				

Randell

1888 Gower by-election
Party	Candidate	Votes	%	±%
Liberal	David Randell	3,964	54.1	N/A
Conservative	John Dillwyn-Llewelyn	3,358	45.9	N/A
Majority		606	8.2	N/A
Turnout		7,322	67.2	N/A
Registered electors		10,896		
Liberal hold		Swing	N/A	

== See also ==
- A map of Glamorganshire in 1885, showing its new divisions.
- Gower (Senedd constituency)
- List of parliamentary constituencies in West Glamorgan
- List of parliamentary constituencies in Wales

== Sources ==
- Morgan, Kenneth O. (1960). "Democratic Politics in Glamorgan, 1884–1914" (PDF). Morgannwg. 4: 5–27.
- Morgan, Kenneth O (1991). Wales in British Politics 1868–1922 (3rd ed.). Cardiff: University of Wales Press. ISBN 0708311245.

Parliament of the United Kingdom
Preceded by North Antrim	Constituency represented by the father of the House; 1952–1959	Succeeded by Woodford
