= John Williams (Gower MP) =

Welsh politician

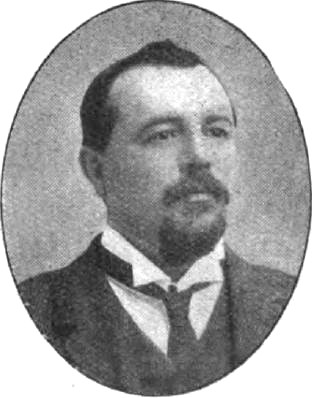
Williams in the mid-1900s.

John Williams (17 February 1861 – 20 June 1922) was a Welsh Labour Party politician.

Williams was born in Aberaman and began working at a local coal mine at the age of twelve. Eight years later, he was elected as checkweighman, a post he held for twelve years. He then became a full-time miners' agent for the Western Miners' Association. In this role, he was a close associate of William Abraham.

A supporter of the Liberal-Labour movement, Williams served on Mountain Ash Urban District Council. In 1898, he was nominated as a candidate for Glamorgan County Council but declined to go to the poll.

At the 1906 general election, Williams was first elected as Member of Parliament for the Welsh constituency of Gower in West Glamorgan. He stood as an Independent Liberal candidate and won election despite being opposed by an official Liberal candidate. Upon election, he took the Liberal whip and was active in the Liberal party's trade union group. When the Miners' Federation of Great Britain decided to affiliate to the Labour Party in 1909, along with the other Welsh mining MPs, he joined the Labour Party.

== Death ==
He held his seat until his death in 1922, at the age of 60.

== Bibliography ==
- Leigh Rayment's Historical List of MPs

Parliament of the United Kingdom
Preceded by John Aeron Thomas	Member of Parliament for Gower; 1906 – 1922	Succeeded by David Grenfell
Trade union offices
Preceded by Isaac Evans	Agent for the Western Miners' Association; 1897–1898	Position abolished
New post	Agent for the Western District of the South Wales Miners' Federation; 1898–1906	Succeeded by W. E. Morgan
