= David Grenfell =

British politician (1881-1968)

The Right Honourable David Grenfell CBE
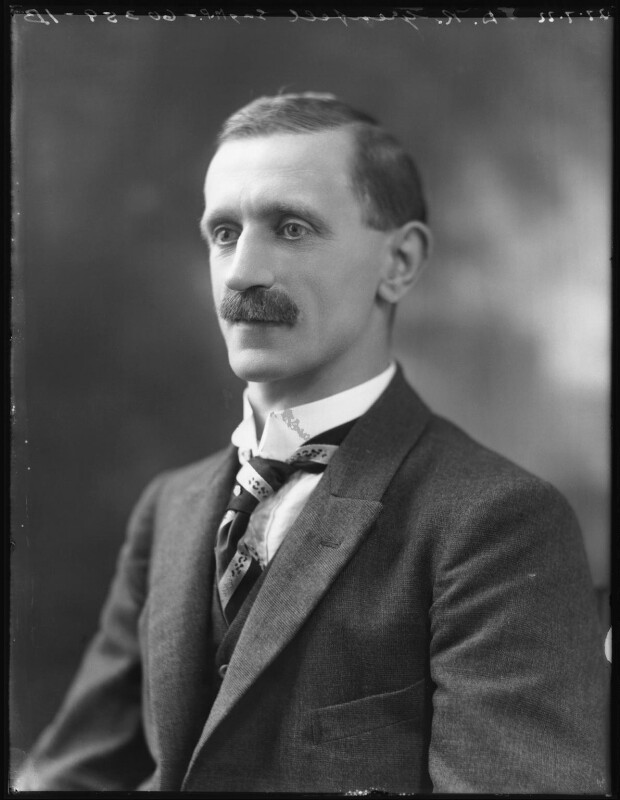
- Grenfell in 1922

Father of the House
- In office 8 October 1952 – 8 October 1959
- Preceded by: Sir Hugh O'Neill
- Succeeded by: Sir Winston Churchill

Member of Parliament for Gower
- In office 15 November 1922 – 18 September 1959
- Preceded by: John Williams
- Succeeded by: Ifor Davies

Personal details
- Born: David Rhys Grenfell; 16 June 1881 Penyrheol, Swansea, Wales
- Died: 21 November 1968 (aged 87) Swansea, Wales
- Party: Labour
- Spouse: Beatrice May Morgan (m. 1905)
- Children: 1

David Rhys Grenfell, CBE, PC (16 June 1881 – 21 November 1968), sometimes known as Dai Grenfell, was a Welsh Member of Parliament. He represented the Gower constituency for the Labour Party from 1922 to 1959.

== Early life ==
Grenfell was born on 16 June 1881 at Penyrheol, Gorseinon, Swansea, one of ten children of William Grenfell (a native of Blaenavon, Monmouthshire) and his wife, Ann, Hopkins (of Aberavon). His grandfather, John Grenfell, settled in Blaenavon where he became a coal miner, having been born in Sancreed, Cornwall.

Grenfell was educated at Penyrheol Board Elementary School until 1893, when, at the age of 12, he was forced to start working as a coal miner underground himself. While working he attended night school to study mining, geology and mathematics; and in 1903 he went to Nova Scotia, where he worked with people of various nationalities, which help foster his love of learning languages. While in Canada he passed his Under Managers Certificate; and in 1905 he returned to Britain, where he obtained First-Class Managers qualifications. Grenfell taught at a number of evening classes himself from 1907 to 1911, and was named a miners' agent in 1916 for the Western Region of the South Wales Area of the Coalminer's Federation upon the death of his predecessor, William Morgan.

== Marriage ==
In December 1905 Grenfell married Beatrice May Morgan, daughter of John and Emma Morgan of Mountain Cottage, Brynteg, Gorseinon. They had one daughter, Eileen.

== Political career ==
Grenfell continued to work underground until 1916, when he was appointed the miners agent for the Western Region of the South Wales Area. He became active in the local Labour Party in 1916; and in 1920 he was adopted prospective candidate for the Gower constituency. He was elected Member of Parliament (MP) in a by-election in 1922, and held the seat until 1959. He was made a Commander of the Order of the British Empire (CBE) in 1935.

"DR", as he was known, was a member of the Parliamentary Select Committee on Betting, a member of the Parliamentary Administration Committee, and served on the Forestry Commission and on the Royal Commission of Safety in Mines in 1936. He became chairman of the Franco/British Parliamentary Party, for which he was later invested with the Chevalier of the Legion of Honour. Grenfell strongly condemned the signing of the Molotov–Ribbentrop Pact, stating in October 1939: "I know what Russia has done. It has been a most despicable act. We say in this country that kicking a man when he is down is the act of a coward. Russia, stepped in and kicked Poland when she was prostrate and shook hands with the aggressor. There is no word for it. I do not know what Russia proposes to do in future, but I am sure it does not reduce the crime against Poland by one iota because they have been two aggressors instead of one."

He acted as chairman of the Welsh Parliamentary Labour Party, and in Winston Churchill's coalition government during World War II he served as Secretary for Mines at the Board of Trade (1940–45), in which capacity he argued for the nationalisation of the coal industry, and reiterated the call in his 1947 book, Coal.

From 1948 to 1951 Grenfell was Chairman of the Welsh Tourist Holiday Board; and while holding that post he saw Gower become the first area of Britain to be designated an Area of Outstanding Natural Beauty. In 1951 Grenfell was sworn of the Privy Council. In 1953 Grenfell became the first Labour politician to hold the title "Father of the House", as the longest continual serving Parliamentarian. Churchill had entering Parliament before him but his time as an MP was not continuous. In 1954, at Churchill's 80th birthday ceremony in Westminster Hall, Grenfell (as Father of the House) presented Churchill with an illuminated book signed by nearly every member of Parliament. Grenfell said he had "a personal regard and deep respect for a great colleague", and added: "None of us will ever forget his great example to Parliament and to the nation. He has been a great leader in our greatest national trial."

Grenfell held office in many local bodies, and was made an Honorary Freeman of Swansea for his contribution to public service. A bust of him now stands in the Swansea Guildhall. He was succeeded as Member of Parliament for Gower by his former agent, County Councillor Ifor Davies of Gowerton, who held the Gower seat until his death in 1982. His brother, William John Grenfell, was for a number of years a member of Llwchwr Urban District Council, representing the Pontybrenin ward.

== Death ==
Grenfell resided at "Ardwyn", Carnglas Road, Sketty, Swansea. He died on 20 November 1968 aged 87, and is buried at Brynteg Cemetery, Gorseinon. His wife, Beatrice, who was a county magistrate, died in 1976, followed by their daughter Eileen (1907–1992).

== Sources ==
- Leigh Rayment's Historical List of MPs

Parliament of the United Kingdom
Preceded by John Williams	Member of Parliament for Gower; 1922–1959	Succeeded by Ifor Davies
Preceded by Sir Hugh O'Neill, Bt.	Father of the House; 1952–1959	Succeeded by Winston Churchill
Trade union offices
Preceded by W. E. Morgan	Agent for the Western District of the South Wales Miners' Federation; 1916–1922	Succeeded by D. J. Williams
Preceded by Walter Smith and William Straker	Auditor of the Trades Union Congress; 1921; With: Samuel Lomax	Succeeded by Herbert Elvin and Samuel Lomax
