= 1888 Gower by-election =

UK parliamentary by-election

The 1888 Gower by-election was a parliamentary by-election held for the British House of Commons constituency of Gower in South Wales on 27 March 1888.

== Vacancy ==
The vacancy resulted from the death of the sitting member, Frank Ash Yeo, who had held the seat since it was formed in 1885.

== Result ==
David Randell was elected by a small majority, defeating the Conservative landowner, John Dillwyn-Llewellyn.

1888 Gower by-election
Party	Candidate	Votes	%	±%
Liberal	David Randell	3,964	54.1	N/A
Conservative	John Dillwyn-Llewelyn	3,358	45.9	N/A
Majority		606	8.2	N/A
Turnout		7,322	67.2	N/A
Registered electors		10,896		
Liberal hold		Swing	N/A	

== See also ==
- List of United Kingdom by-elections
- United Kingdom by-election records
