= 1982 Gower by-election =

UK parliamentary by-election

← 1979	16 Sep 1982	1983 →

Constituency of Gower
- Turnout: 65.4% (▼15.4%)
	First party	Second party
Candidate	Gareth Wardell	Gwynoro Jones
Party	Labour	SDP
Popular vote	17,095	9,875
Percentage	43.5%	25.1%
Swing	▼9.7%	▲16.1%
	Third party	Fourth party
Candidate	Trefor Llewellyn	Ieuan Owen
Party	Conservative	Plaid Cymru
Popular vote	8,690	3,431
Percentage	22.1%	8.7%
Swing	▼8.5%	▲1.5%
MP before election
Ifor Davies
Labour
Subsequent MP
Gareth Wardell
Labour

The 1982 Gower by-election of 16 September 1982 was held after the death of Labour Member of Parliament (MP) Ifor Davies on 6 June 1982. The seat was held by Labour in the by-election.

Amongst the candidates was David Burns who at the time was being held on remand over charges relating to the bombing of a British Army recruitment office in Pontypridd. A self-declared member of the 'Worker's Army for a Welsh Republic', Burns was ultimately released in 1983 after neither of the two charges were made to stand up.

== Result ==
1982 Gower by-election
Party	Candidate	Votes	%	±%
Labour	Gareth Wardell	17,095	43.5	−9.7
SDP	Gwynoro Jones	9,875	25.1	+16.1
Conservative	Trefor Llewellyn	8,690	22.1	−8.5
Plaid Cymru	Ieuan Owen	3,431	8.7	+1.5
Computer Democrat	John Donovan	125	0.3	N/A
Civil Rights/Welsh Political Prisoner	David Burns	103	0.3	N/A
Majority		7,220	18.4	−4.2
Turnout		39,319	65.4	−15.4
Registered electors		60,123		
Labour hold		Swing	+0.7	
