= John Dillwyn-Venables-Llewelyn =

Welsh racing driver, landowner, and businessman (born 1938)

Sir John Venables-Llewelyn Bt
- Born: 12 August 1938 (age 87)
- Title: 4th Baronet Dillwyn-Venables-Llewelyn of Penllergaer and Ynis-y-gerwn
- Children: 2
- Parents: Sir Charles Dillwyn-Venables-Llewelyn, 3rd Baronet (father); Lady Delia Mary Beach-Hicks (mother)
- Relatives: Michael Hicks Beach, 1st Earl St Aldwyn (great-grandfather)

Sir John Michael Dillwyn-Venables-Llewelyn, 4th Baronet (born 12 August 1938), is a Welsh racing driver, landowner, and businessman. He is the son of Brigadier Sir Charles Michael Dillwyn-Venables-Llewelyn, previous Lord Lieutenant of Radnorshire, (Note: Sir Charles Dillwyn-Venables-Llewelyn was Lord Lieutenant of Radnorshire from 1949 until 1974.) and Lady Delia Mary Hicks-Beach, daughter of the Viscount Quenington. Venables-Llewelyn was educated at Eton College and Cambridge University, and is a direct descendant of the politician, Michael Hicks-Beach, 1st Earl St Aldwyn, via his maternal line.

== Career ==
Between 1998 and 2000, Venables-Llewelyn was managing director of Llandovery College ARTS Centre. At present, he is the appointed director of four companies, including Parc Mawr Investments and Penllergaer Estates; both positions once held by his mother. In 2019, the Wales Online listed him as one of the most influential people in Swansea, and estimated Penllergaer Estates to be worth around £24,000,000.

Venables-Llewelyn, known professionally as Sir John Venables-Llewelyn, is the co-owner of Bryn-y-rhyd farm, in Llanedi, which was subject to controversy in 2021, when planning permission was granted to build a solar farm on the land, with some to likening the plans to the 1965 flooding of the Tryweryn valley.

== Cars ==
In 1970, Venables-Llewelyn partnered with Major Charles Lambton, to design and build a replica Bentley Tourer, using the remains of a damaged 1948 Bentley MkVI. The "Bentley Special", as they called it, had "completely modern servicing facilities, but a standard engine". In an interview with the Reading Evening Post, the partners stated that they did not want to sell the car "until enough people had seen it", adding that they "hoped for orders for replicas".

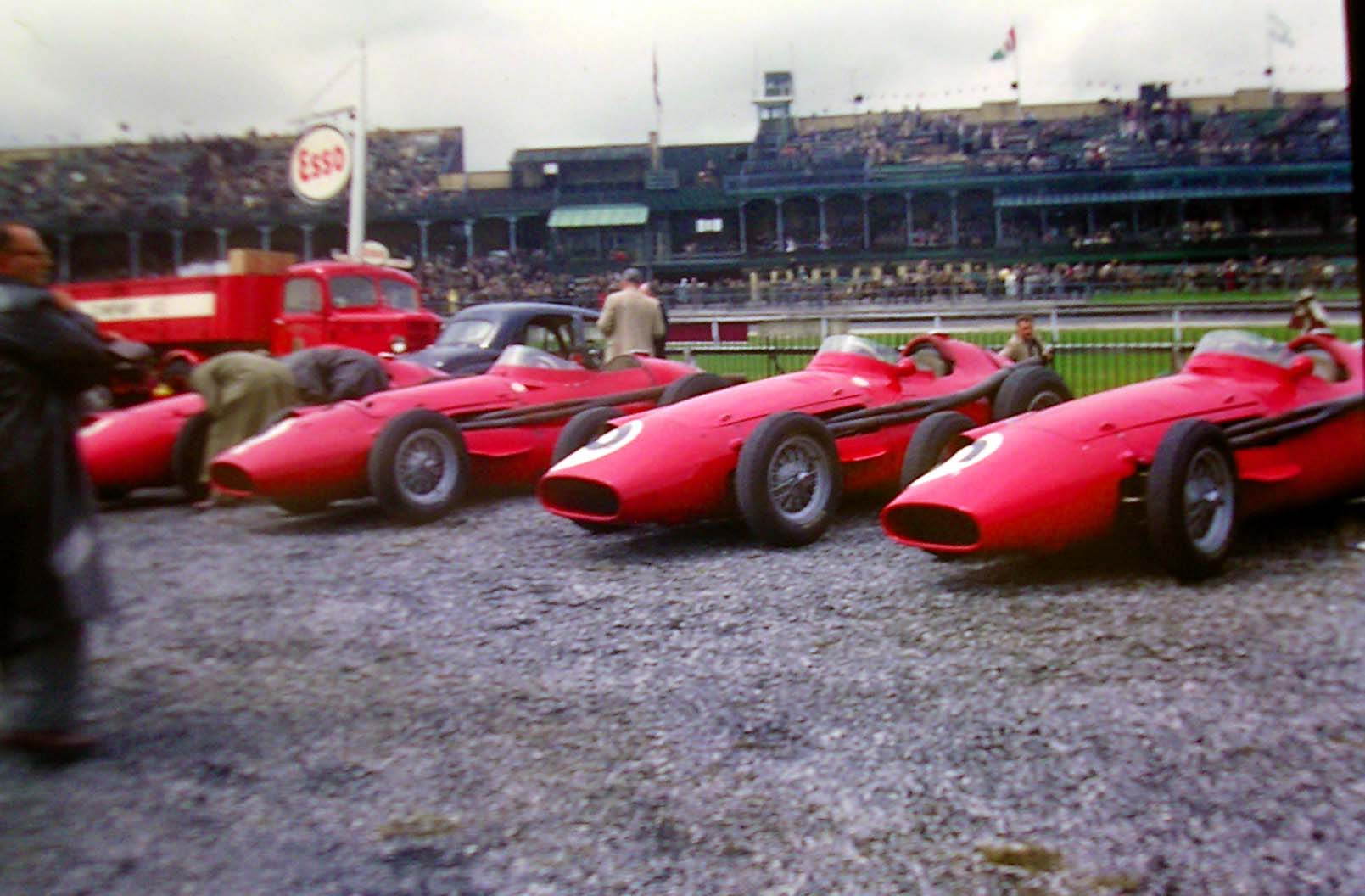
A photograph of the Maserati that Llewelyn went on to drive, among other 250Fs taken at the 1957 British Grand Prix at Aintree.

Venables-Llewelyn was also friends with racing driver and engineer, Anthony Mayman. (Note: Anthony Mayman died on 3 February 1993) In the 1980s, he occasionally raced Mayman's 1954 Maserati 250F, a car which Mayman lent to several of his vintage racing friends.

Venables-Llewelyn is a trustee of the Bugatti Trust and a member of the Bugatti Owners' Club of Great Britain, of which he was Director from 1992, until his resignation in 2001. He was a friend of Fitzroy Somerset, 5th Lord Raglan, (Note: Fitzroy Somerset, 5th Lord Raglan, died on 24 January 2010) and used to race Somerset's Bugatti Type 51 with considerable success, competing in the Monaco Historic Grand Prix on several occasions, consecutively winning the event's "Williams Monaco Trophy" from 1984 to 1986. Venables-Llewelyn also competed successfully in the ACU National Championships, driving his own supercharged ERA and 1934 Alfa Romeo P3.

== Family ==
Venables-Llewelyn has married three times.

Firstly to Nina Hallam, (m. 1963; div. 1972), with whom he had two children:

- Georgina Katherine Dillwyn-Venables-Llewelyn (b. 1964)
- Emma Susan Dillwyn-Venables-Llewelyn (b. 1967)

Secondly to Nina Oliver (m. 1975; div. 1995), with whom he had a daughter, who died in infancy.

Thirdly to Carolyn Lockheart (m. 2005).

== Baronetcy ==
The Dillwyn-Venables-Llewelyn baronetcy was created in 1890 for John Dillwyn-Llewelyn, who was Conservative MP for Swansea. On his death, the baronetcy passed to his son, Charles, who assumed the additional surname "Venables" following his marriage to the daughter of the Rev. Richard Venables, inheriting Llysdinam Hall in the process. On his death, the title and estate passed to his son, Michael, father of John. John Venables-Llewelyn succeeded to the baronetcy on 15 March 1976 following the death of his father, thus becoming the fourth Baronet. There is no heir to the baronetcy.

Venables-Llewelyn lives at the ancestral home of the Dillwyn-Venables-Llewelyn baronets, Llysdinam Hall, in Llandrindod Wells, Powys. (Note: In 2001, Cadw recognised Llysdinam Hall as a Grade-II listed building) The gardens at Llysdinam Hall feature a weather station, and are part of the Met Office's climate network. In 2019, the gardens received an award from the World Meteorological Organisation, recognising Venables-Llewelyn's family's contributions in recording weather since the 1880s.

Venables-Llewelyn owned a collection of photographs taken by pioneering photographer, Henry Fox-Talbot which had passed through his family since his great-grandfather, John Dillwyn-Llewelyn, married into Fox-Talbot's family. In 2013, the Bodleian Library of Oxford University, received a £200,000 grant from the Art Fund Charity, supporting them reach the required £2.2m target to purchase the photograph archive from Venables-Llewelyn. In 2014, the library was successful in acquiring the archive.

== Notes ==
Baronetage of the United Kingdom
Preceded by Sir Michael Dillwyn-Venables-Llewelyn	Baronet (of Penllergare and Ynis-y-gerwn); 1976–present	Incumbent
