= Swansea Town =

Swansea Town may refer to:

- Swansea City A.F.C., formerly Swansea Town A.F.C.
- Swansea (UK Parliament constituency), officially Swansea Town
- "Swansea Town", a song by Max Boyce
