= Winter of 2010–11 in the British Isles =

Winter of 2010–11
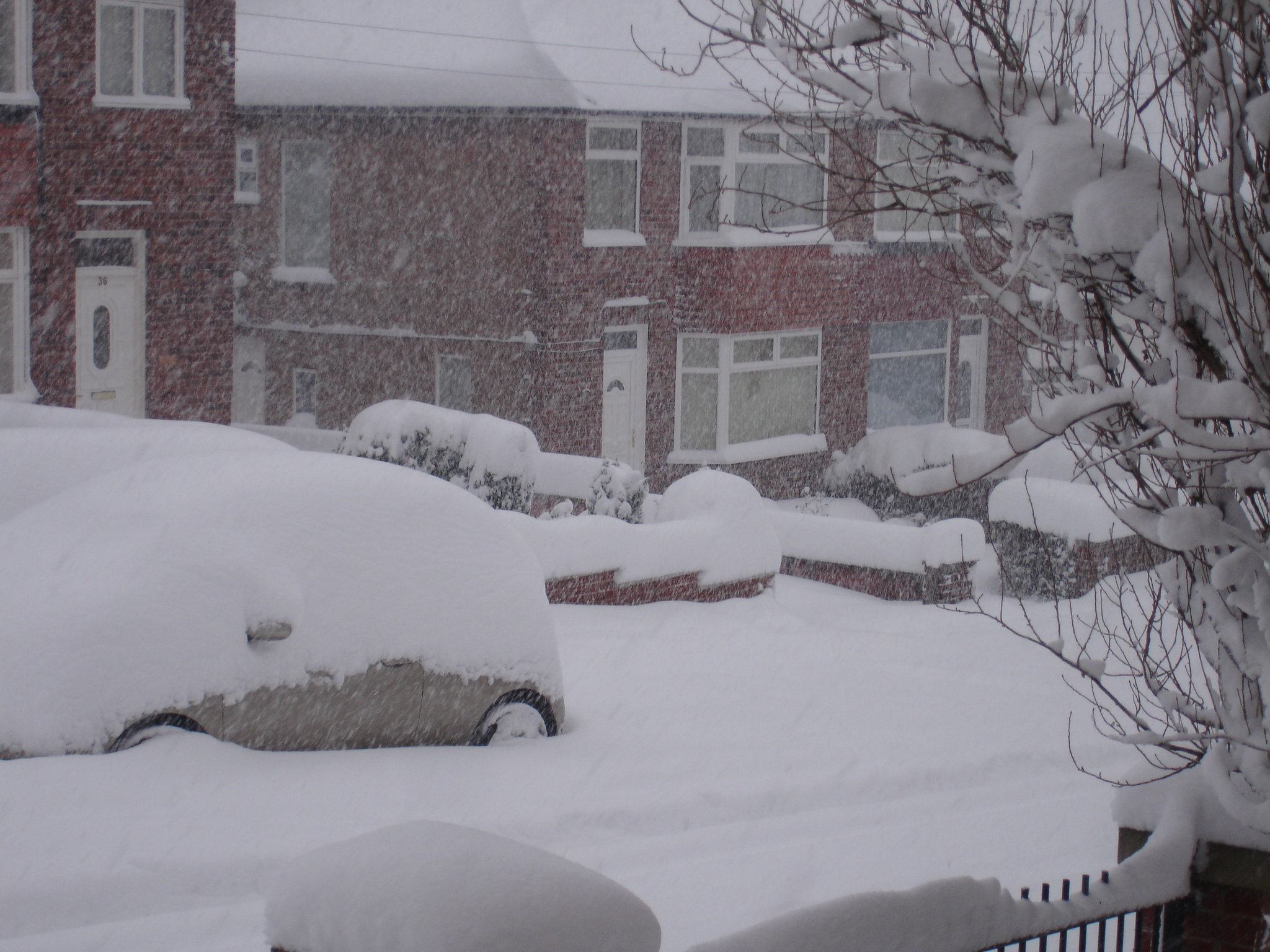
- Snow falling in Sheffield, South Yorkshire; 1 December 2010
- First event started: 24 November 2010
- Last event concluded: 13 March 2011

Seasonal statistics
- Maximum snowfall accumulation: 1.5 m (5 ft) at Sheffield, United Kingdom
- Total fatalities: 20 total
- Total damage: Unknown

Related articles
- 2010–11 North American winter

The winter of 2010–11 brought heavy snowfalls, record low temperatures, travel chaos and school disruption to the islands of Great Britain and Ireland. It included the United Kingdom's coldest December since Met Office records began, with a mean temperature of −1 °C (30 °F), breaking the previous record of 0.1 °C (32.2 °F) in December 1981. It was also the second coldest December in the narrower Central England Temperature (CET) record series which began in 1659, falling 0.1 °C short of the all-time record set in 1890. Although data has never officially been compiled, December 2010 is thought to be colder than December 1890 over the United Kingdom as a whole, as Scotland was up to 2 °C warmer than England. Hence, it is thought to be the coldest December across Great Britain since before 1659.

The winter of 2010 in England saw the earliest widespread winter snowfall since 1993 with snow falling as early as 24 November across Northumberland and North Yorkshire. A maximum snow depth of 76 cm (30 in) was recorded on 1 December in the Peak District, Sheffield, Doncaster, the Cotswold Hills and the Forest of Dean. In this event Scotland, Yorkshire and Northern England at large were most severely affected. On 9 December temperatures recovered across much of the UK, causing a partial thaw.

Later, on Thursday 16 December a cold front reintroduced a cold, arctic airstream. This cold spell brought further snow and ice chaos back to Ireland and Britain with Southern England, Wales, the Republic of Ireland and Northern Ireland bearing the brunt of the wintry conditions. This led to severe disruption to the road and rail network with several airports being closed including London Heathrow Airport for a time. Several local temperature records were broken including a new record low for Northern Ireland of −18.7 °C (−1.7 °F) recorded at Castlederg on 23 December 2010.

By the new year a thaw had begun, and there was no recurrence of the extreme conditions for the remainder of the winter. There was some snowfall in early January, and there was an anticyclonic spell at the end of the month that brought some cold, frosty days. February was above average in temperature and ended on a mild note, although the snow returned in much of Scotland during March.

== Background ==
During the latter part of November, northern blocking established over Greenland which resulted in the jet stream moving south, allowing cold air to flow in from the east. Forecasters warned of the potential for severe winter weather from weeks in advance and the Government stated that they were prepared for winter weather after the previous British winter of 2009–2010 caused widespread disruption. The cold weather arrived in Britain and Ireland on 22 November and by 24 November, snow showers brought by a stiff northerly wind fell over the North East of England and Northern and Eastern Scotland which resulted in 10–20 cm (4–8 in) locally and gridlock in many of the major roads within Aberdeen during the evening rush hour of 24 November.

In the following days, the snow fell far more widely leading to widespread travel disruption, school closures and cancellation of sporting fixtures. The Met Office confirmed that it was the most widespread snowfall in the United Kingdom for 17 years. By 2 December, most of the United Kingdom and much of Ireland was covered with snow, accumulations in the north and east of Scotland and England were over 50 cm (20 in) in places, with over 1 m (39 in) of snow lying on much of the Scottish mountains. Snow depths elsewhere were between 5–30 cm (2–12 in) widely. Temperatures fell widely below −10 °C (14 °F) with some areas staying sub-zero by day. On 2 December there was particularly low temperatures in major towns and cities, particularly in Scotland where it dropped to −18 °C (0 °F) in Aberdeen and on 3 December temperatures in England broke records. However, the lowest temperature of the winter of −21.2 °C (−6.2 °F) was recorded at Altnaharra, Sutherland at 10 am on 2 December and Braemar and Kinbrace both dropped to −20 °C (−4 °F) on the night of 2 December. 7 people have been confirmed to have died due to the cold weather.

== Reported effects ==
=== Deaths ===
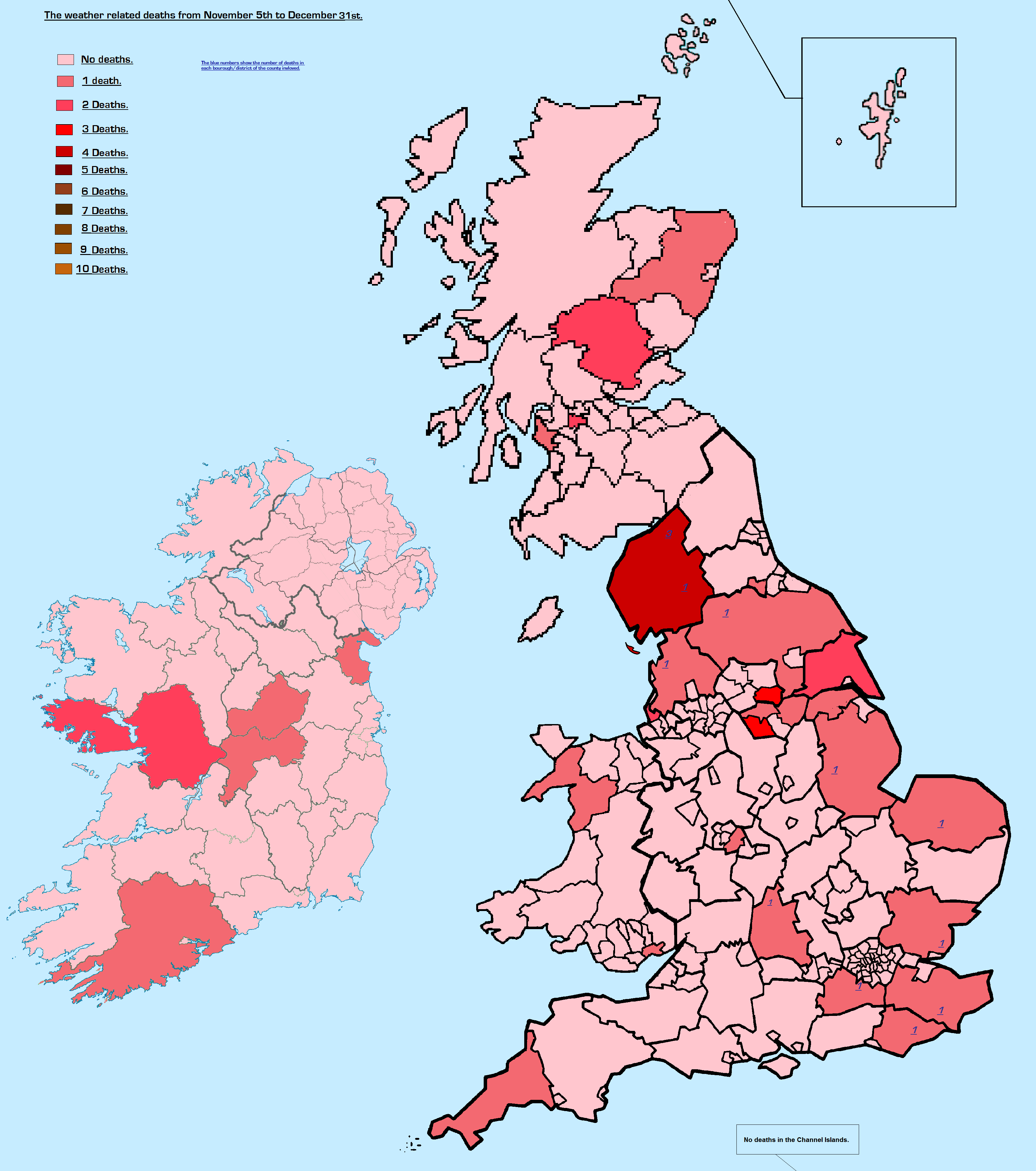
Map of fatalities in Ireland and the UK caused by Windstorm Carmen, Windstorm Becky and other blizzard or storm events between 8 November and 31 December. Click for legend.

- On 30 November in Newport, South Wales a man was found dead in the street—it was assumed that he froze to death after collapsing with a heart attack.
- Two old-age pensioners were found in the snow in their gardens dead from hypothermia at the beginning of December.
- On 2 December two teenage girls died in a car crash caused by ice on the A595 in Cumbria.
- On 6 December a 70-year-old man was found dead in the snow in a caravan park in Cleethorpes, and a man died trying to clear snow outside his home in Darlington, County Durham.
- There were several deaths on 18 December: a 17-year-old boy from Bilsington, Kent, was killed when his car left the road; two pedestrians died after being hit by a Range Rover in Glasgow; a woman in her 60s from the Inverness area, was killed in a three-vehicle pile-up in Huntly, Aberdeenshire; and a man in his early 30s suffered life-threatening injuries when his Mini was in a crash with a highways vehicle near Eastbourne, East Sussex, and died after an ambulance being driven by a police officer left a country road in poor weather conditions and careered into a bush on Standard Hill, in Ninfield.
- On 19 December there were several more deaths. A 33-year-old man died after falling through the ice on Doggetts Lake in Rochford, Essex; a road crash killed 16-year-old James Doran and Jordan Kenny when the car they were travelling in lost control on an icy road in Liverpool and ploughed into a garden wall; a 15-year-old girl died in a snowboarding accident in Douglas, County Cork, Ireland; and a 35-year-old woman and her 9-year-old son were killed in a car crash caused by ice and snow near Castlebellingham in County Louth, Ireland.
- On 22 December, a 48-year-old man died from hypothermia, after sleeping overnight in the Bible Gardens, behind the cathedral in Bangor, North Wales.

=== Economy ===
The severe cold spell came in the run up to Christmas and was estimated to cost the British economy up to £1.2 billion a day with a total cost of £13 billion. Retailers were particularly badly hit by lost sales with footfall down nearly 20% compared to the same period the previous year and as much as 30% in the West Midlands and South East. Some experts suggested that it may have a knock on effect in delaying or reversing economic growth. Christmas is usually the most profitable period for the pub and restaurant industry, however, due to disruptions to delivery routes, numerous stock outs and disappointing trading updates were reported.

=== Transport ===
==== Road ====
On 1 December the M1 motorway was temporarily closed, and the Forth Road Bridge was closed for over ten hours due to heavy snowfall. This was the first time the bridge had been closed because of snow. The same day, the A57 was closed in the evening between Anston and Worksop and over 100 motorists were stranded overnight. Thousands of motorists across Sheffield became stranded on 1–7 December as up to as much as 61 cm (2 ft) of snow fell on the city with severe disruption across the county of South Yorkshire including the suspension of all bus services for 24 hours. On 6 December, vehicles were trapped on the M8 for over 10 hours, and more than 1,000 vehicles became stuck on the M876.

==== Rail ====
Eurostar rail services to the continent were cancelled on 20 December causing severe delays with queues at St Pancras station stretching more than 800 metres (1/2 mi) as far back as the British Library. At the same time. services were cancelled on the East Coast Main Line between London and Peterborough due to damage to overhead power cables caused by accretion of ice.

==== Air ====
At Newcastle Airport, a plane overshot its target stop position on the runway, but remaining on the hard surface. This caused the airport to be temporarily closed. No passengers were injured. Gatwick Airport and Edinburgh Airport were closed all day on 1 December due to heavy snow.

=== Other effects ===
7,000 schools in the UK were closed on 2 December.

== Timeline ==
=== November 2010 ===
In late November, a snow storm had moved from southern Sweden, reaching Northumberland and the Scottish Borders Region during 23 November. The Met Office issued a number of weather warnings, and snow began to fall in the early evening of 24 November, with 2 inches (5 cm) recorded in Newcastle upon Tyne.

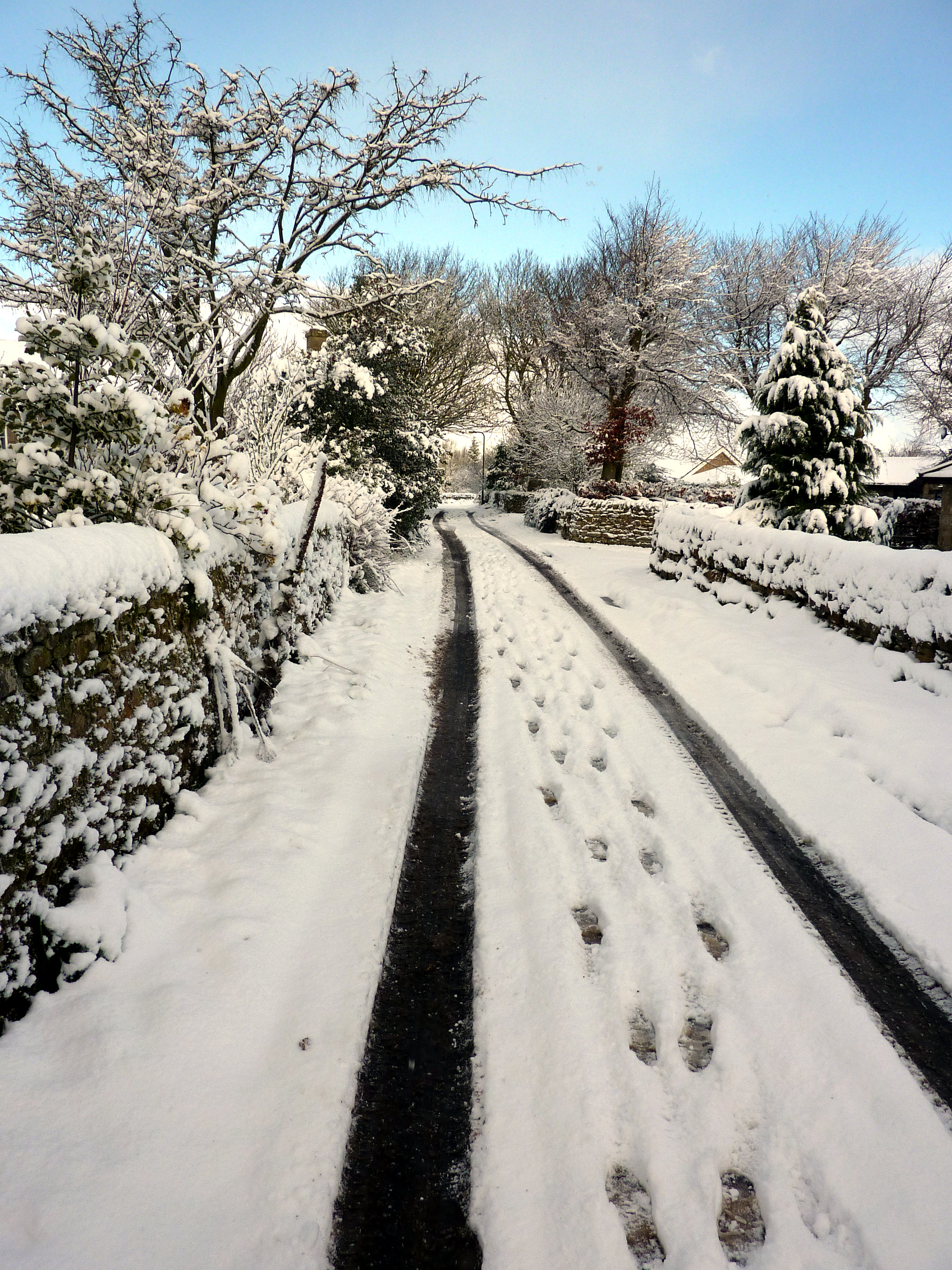
Snow in Northumberland on 25 November

By 26 November, nighttime temperatures fell well below 0 °C (32 °F), with the Welsh towns of Sennybridge and Trawscoed being among the coldest places at −10.2 °C (13.6 °F). The cold snap heralded the earliest winter snow fall for 17 years. The AA dealt with an estimated 15,500 calls regarding breakdowns on the same day. The night of the 26/27 November saw a thunder storm damage electrical systems and flood roads, causing disruption transport services on 27 November, including to trains in Dublin. Elsewhere in Ireland, the Irish Insurance Federation revealed there were 22,450 claims from the public, the majority of which involved snow or ice damage to people's homes. The DART and the northern commuter and Maynooth commuter lines were not running and Belfast and Rosslare train services out of Dublin were also affected. The main runway at Dublin Airport due to snow and ice for most of the day.

Later in November, the Met Office's warnings remained in place across much of the UK, with Scotland and North East England predicted to have the heaviest snowfalls, with new warnings in place for icy roads in Northern Ireland and Wales. Snow was causing problems on some roads, with gritters deployed as temperatures dipped to -3 °C (27 °F). The AA reportedly faced a 40% increase in call-outs, compared to an average November. Motorists in Wales and Northern Ireland struggled with icy roads while Scotland was facing more heavy snow and drifts thanks to a biting wind.

The CET (Central England Temperature) was −4.0 °C (24.8 °F) on 28 November, the lowest November CET mean since −4.6 °C (23.7 °F) was recorded on 24 November 1904. The lowest temperature of the month was also recorded on this day, with −17.5 °C (0.5 °F) recorded at Llysdinam, Wales. The Met Office at RAF Linton-on-Ouse in North Yorkshire recorded a record low for November of −11.2 °C (11.8 °F); earlier that month on the 4th it had recorded a record maximum for November of 17.6 °C (63.7 °F).

=== December 2010 ===
According to the Manley Central England Temperature record (beginning in 1659), December 2010 was the second-coldest December ever recorded in central England. It was also the coldest December in the UK since UK records began in 1890, and the coldest December in Ireland since official records began.

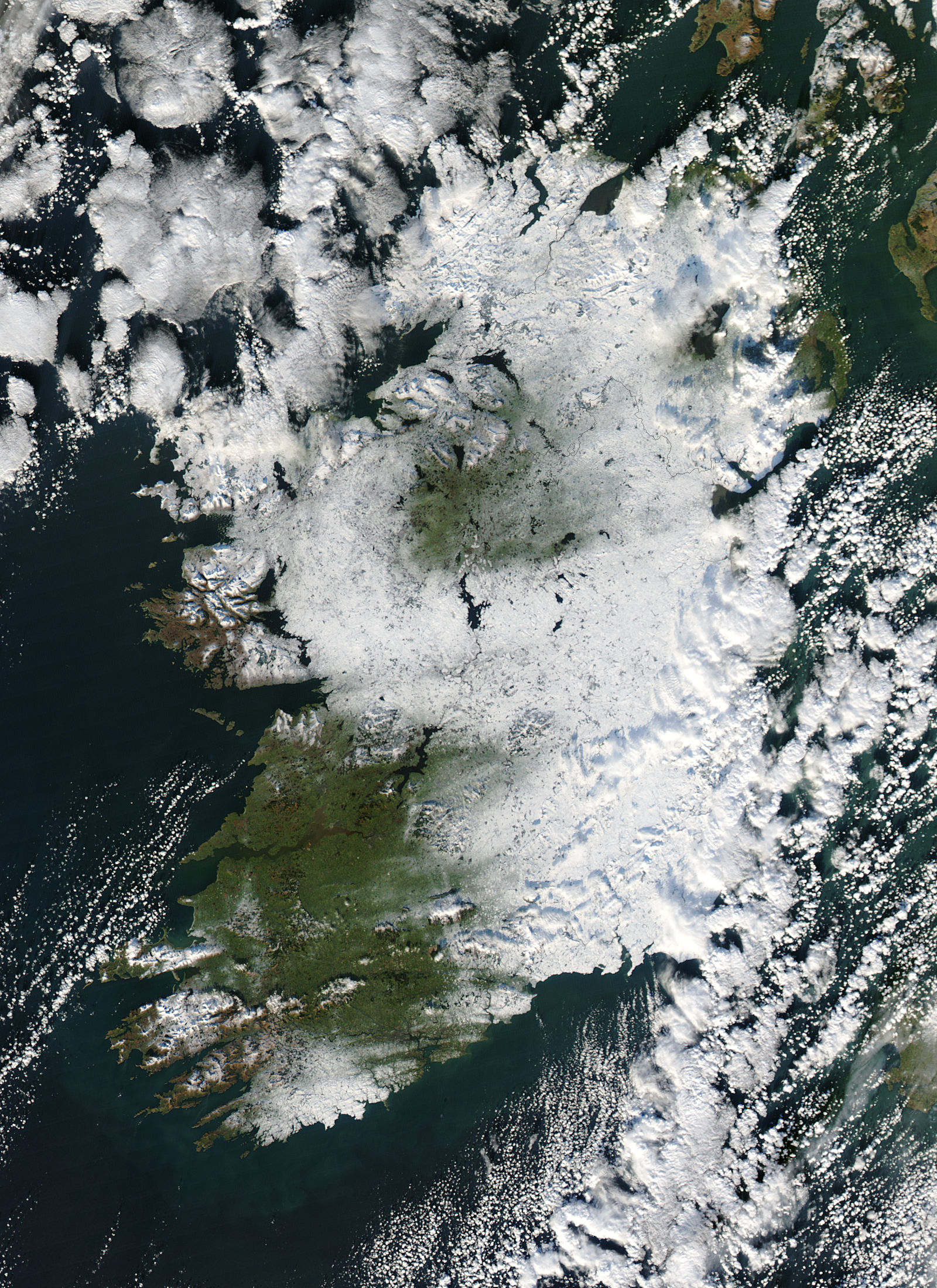
Photograph of snow in Ireland taken by the NASA Aqua satellite on 2 December 2010

In early December, a minimum of −21.1 °C (−6.0 °F) was recorded at Altnaharra, Scottish Highlands. A band of snow moving north affected Lincolnshire, Nottinghamshire, South and West Yorkshire, giving significant accumulations here, with further frequent heavy snow showers to North East England and Eastern Scotland. Up to 40 cm (16 in) of snow was recorded in Rotherham and Sheffield, 20 cm (8 in) of fresh snow in Mansfield (bringing total depths to over 30 cm), 20 to 30 cm (8 to 12 in) in Leeds, 30 cm (12 in) in Pontefract and up to 40 cm (16 in) in parts of Lincolnshire.

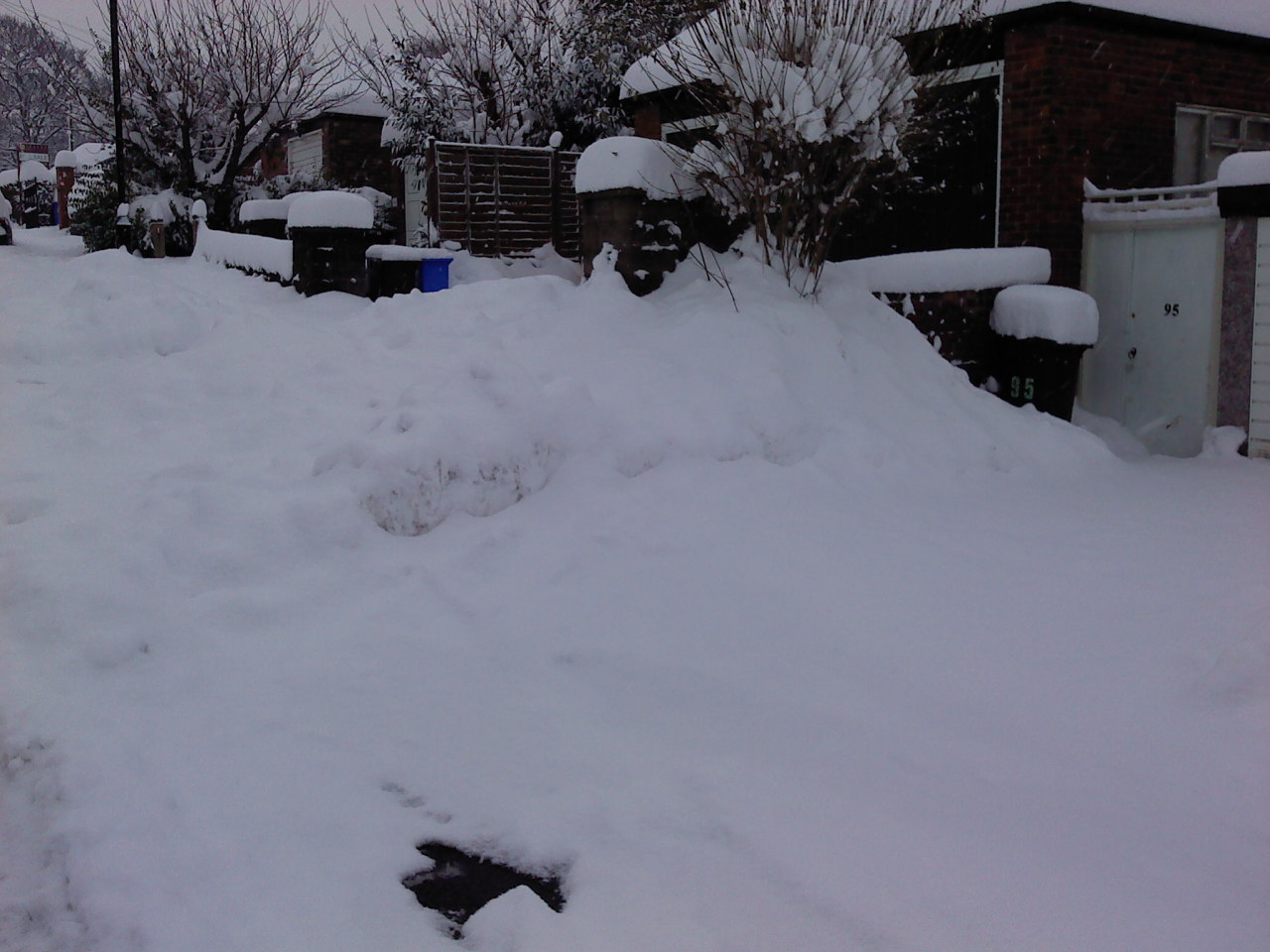
Very heavy snow that had fallen in Sheffield on 1 December 2010

On 3 December, an all-time record low of −17.9 °C (−0.2 °F) recorded at RAF Leeming (since records began at Leeming in 1945) and −19.0 °C (−2.2 °F) at RAF Topcliffe in North Yorkshire.

By 6 December, snowfall in the Central Belt in Scotland led to the closure of the M8 motorway for two days with hundreds of motorists stranded overnight. The resulting political furore led to the resignation of Scottish Minister for Transport, Stewart Stevenson.

By mid-December, a cold front reached the Shetland Isles and moved southwards across Scotland. Mild air preceded the front, with cold air straight from the Arctic following it, resulting in some rapid temperature drops throughout Scotland and its Isles. An unofficial temperature of 11.6 °C (52.9 °F), the highest of the month so far, was recorded near Lairg, Scottish Highlands at around 7pm in the milder air. The cold front continued to move southwards across the UK passing Northern Ireland and Northern England.

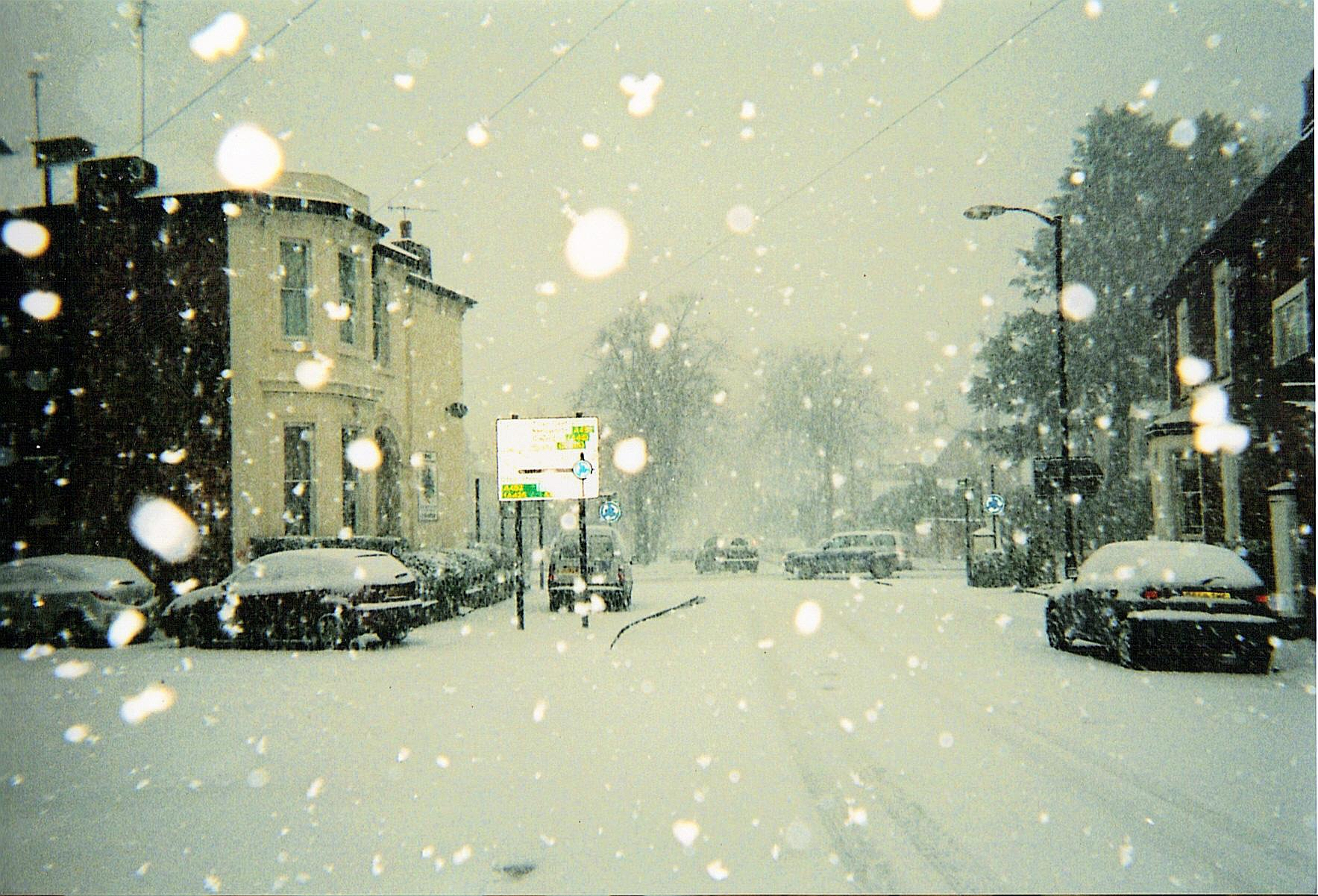
A blizzard on 18 December 2010, at Leamington Spa, Warwickshire.

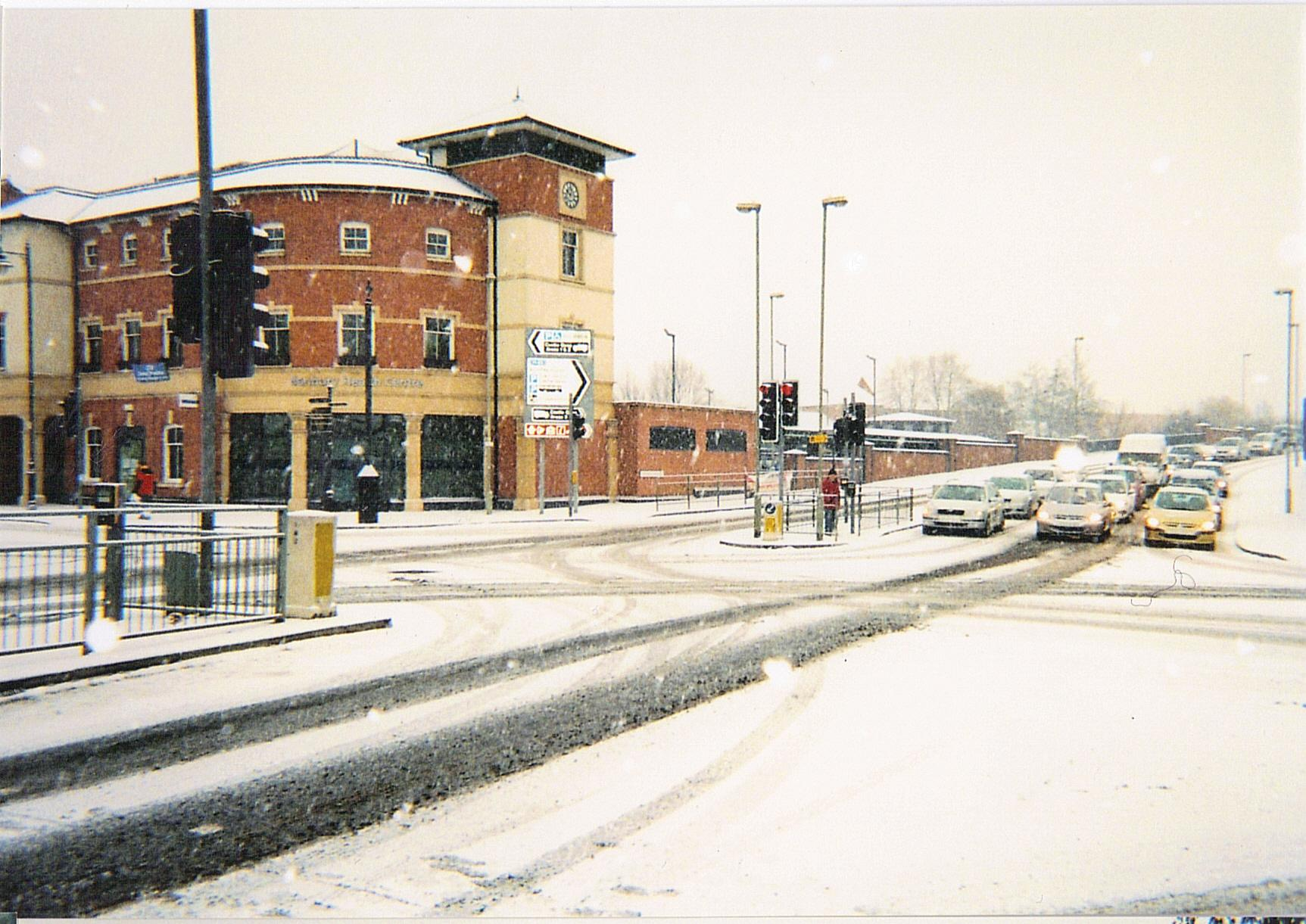
The ungritted roads in the town centre in Banbury, Oxfordshire, on 18 December 2010.

Later in December, the M5 became gridlocked, and shops in the Birmingham area closed early on the last Saturday before Christmas. A number of passengers travelling by coach had to spend the night at Birmingham Coach Station due to not only coaches for onwards destinations being unable to depart and arrive Birmingham, but also widespread disruption to train services making onwards alternatives impossible. Airports including Heathrow Airport closed some its runways for a time, with Gatwick also cancelling a number of flights.

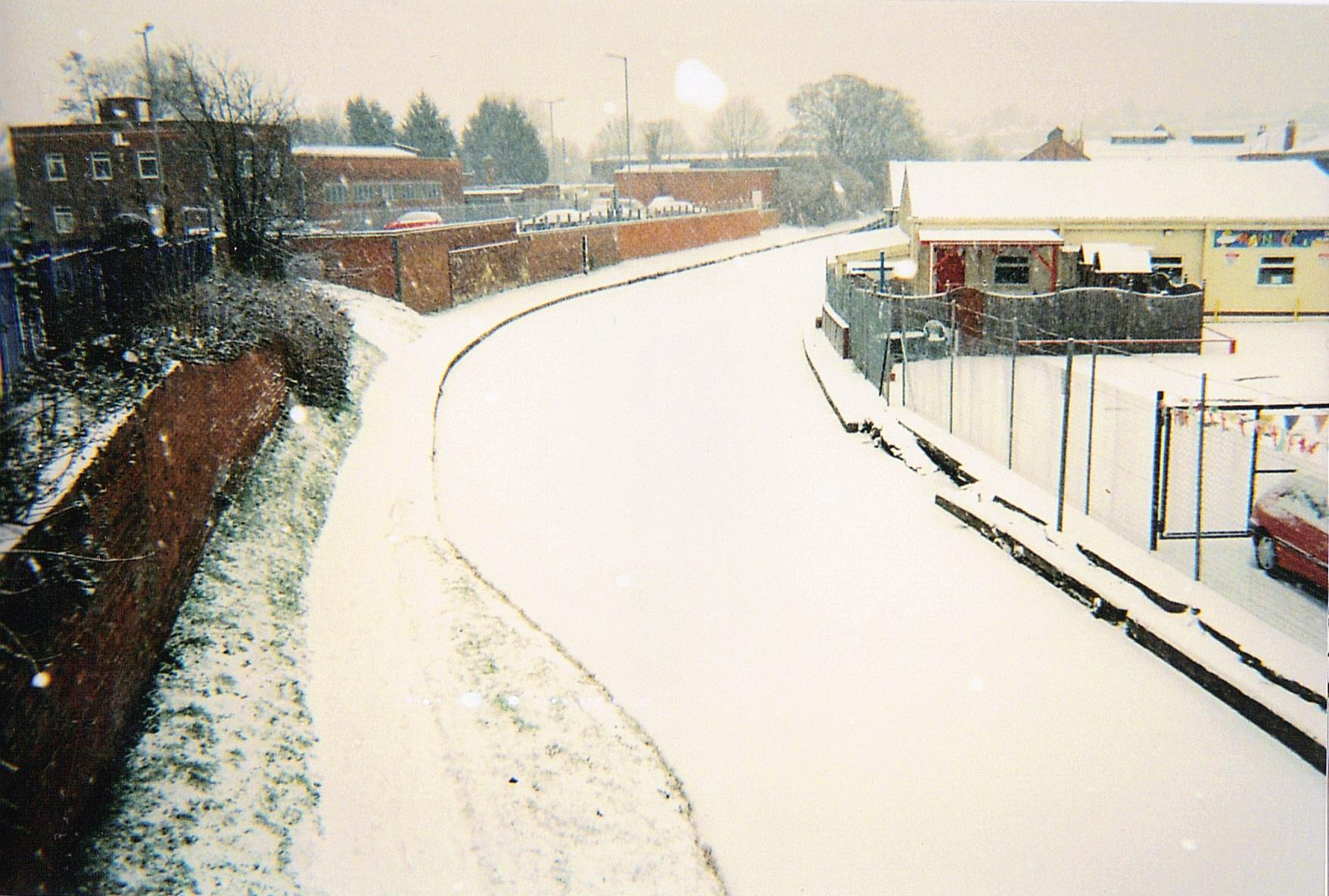
The Oxford Canal in Banbury, frozen solid on 19 December 2010.

A minimum temperature of −19.6 °C (−3.3 °F) was recorded in Shawbury, Shropshire. And a minimum temperature of −17.6 °C (0.3 °F) was recorded at Castlederg, a new record for Northern Ireland and −19.6 °C (−3.3 °F) was recorded at Chesham, Buckinghamshire. Heavy snow fall was also reported over large parts of Devon causing major travel disruption. Dublin Airport and City of Derry Airport were forced to fully close, 15 cm (6 inches) of snow was recorded at Dublin Airport. Only three days after breaking the record minimum for Northern Ireland, Castlederg broke the record again with a low of −18.7 °C (−1.7 °F).

On 24 December, it was decided to cancel the 27th IRFU's Celtic League meeting with Leinster as Ulster's Ravenhill pitch froze under heavy snow. Both northern and southern Ireland were under heavy snow.

25 December 2010 was also the coldest Christmas Day since 1830, with a CET of −5.9 °C (21.4 °F). The Republic of Ireland's lowest-ever December temperature on record was also recorded on Christmas Day, at −17.5 °C (0.5 °F) at Straide, County Mayo.

At the end of December, thousands of homes and businesses in Northern Ireland and Wales were without water as melting snow and ice revealed many burst pipes. Northern Ireland Water said it was alternating supplies from reservoirs in order to help alleviate the crisis in which some properties had been without supplies since before Christmas.

=== January 2011 ===
January again was colder than average across the UK, though much milder than December, with a mean temperature across the UK of 3.1 °C (37.6 °F). In contrast to December, it was dry across most of the country (except South East England which was wetter than average). It had more frost than average across most of the UK. However, freezing rain caused disruption in Shropshire, and Greater Manchester experienced heavy overnight snow which affected travel on the morning of the 4th. and snow fell in the West Midlands and parts of Wales, Cheshire and Lancashire on 7 January.

Welsh flood warnings stay in place in four areas, with roads closed after heavy bursts of rain affecting Conwy and Gwynedd. By 15.55 GMT, there were four flood warnings and six flood alerts 16 January 2011.

=== February 2011 ===
February was a mild month (the 9th mildest in the last century) with very little frost and much of the country having its first snow-free February since 1998. The only significant wintry weather came on the 18th-21st when some overnight dustings of snow fell as far south as the Midlands.

=== March 2011 ===
Heavy snow once again started to cover parts of Scotland, affecting travel from 9 March, with fresh snowfalls bringing more travel disruption on 12 March. Persistent snow affected much of the Highlands of Scotland during the 12th-13th of the month, with reports of 40 cm (16 in) of lying snow near Fort William and 60 cm (24 in) of lying snow to the north of Aviemore, with severe drifting.

== Weather statistics and records ==
In Ireland it was the coldest month since records began and in the UK it was the coldest December since Met Office records began in 1910, with a mean temperature of −1 °C (30 °F). It broke the previous record of 0.1 °C (32.2 °F) in December 1981.

December 2010 has the lowest CET, −0.7 °C (30.7 °F), since a CET of −1.1 °C (30.0 °F) was recorded for February 1986. December 2010 can also be confirmed to be the coldest December for 120 years, since a monthly CET of −0.8 °C (30.6 °F) was recorded for December 1890 and the second-coldest December since records began in 1659. Probably the most notable record of the winter is the new all-time record low for Northern Ireland, of −18.7 °C (−1.7 °F) recorded on 23 December at Castlederg, County Tyrone. In addition, all of these sites recorded their all-time record lows since recording began, this winter:

- Andrewsfield at −13.8 °C (7.2 °F) on 20 December
- Aultbea at −8.5 °C (16.7 °F) on 18 December
- Ballykelly at −13.3 °C (8.1 °F) on 23 December
- Belfast Aldergrove Airport at −14.9 °C (5.2 °F) on 21 December
- Capel Curig at −17.5 °C (0.5 °F) on 20 December
- Carlisle lowest maximum of −7.9 °C (17.8 °F) on 8 December
- Church Fenton at −17.5 °C (0.5 °F) on 3 December
- Cranfield at −12 °C (10 °F) on 20 December
- Crosby at −17.6 °C (0.3 °F) on 21 December
- Dishforth at −15 °C (5 °F) on 6 December
- Dunkeswell Aerodrome at −9.2 °C (15.4 °F) on 19 December
- Exeter Airport at −16.5 °C (2.3 °F) on 26 December
- Farnborough at −14.2 °C (6.4 °F) on 20 December
- Gravesend-Broadness at −10.5 °C (13.1 °F) on 20 December
- Hawarden at −12.6 °C (9.3 °F) on 20 December
- Hereford Credenhill at −15.8 °C (3.6 °F) on 26 December
- Holbeach at −9.8 °C (14.4 °F) on 7 December
- Humberside at −14 °C (7 °F) on 7 December
- RAF Leeming at −17.9 °C (−0.2 °F) on 3 December
- Linton-on-Ouse at −17.3 °C (0.9 °F) on 3 December
- Redesdale Camp at −19.2 °C (−2.6 °F) on 3 December
- RAF Scampton at −13.6 °C (7.5 °F) on 3 December
- Strathallan at −19.0 °C (−2.2 °F) on 3 December
- RAF Topcliffe at −19.0 °C (−2.2 °F) on 3 December
- Warcop at −11.7 °C (10.9 °F) on 21 December

== See also ==
- January 2013 Great Britain and Ireland snowfall
- Cyclone Carmen
- Winter of 2010–2011 in Europe
- 2010 Albania floods
- 2010 West African floods
- 2010 Central European floods
- 2010 Var floods
- 2010 Northern Hemisphere summer heat wave
- Arctic dipole anomaly
- Arctic oscillation
- Cyclogenesis
- Flood control in the Netherlands
- Gulf Stream
- Muddy flood
- Winter storm
- Xynthia (storm)
