= Willie Llewelyn =

Welsh cricketer

Personal information
- Full name: William Dillwyn Llewelyn
- Born: 1 April 1868; Aberdulais, Glamorgan, Wales
- Died: 24 August 1893 (aged 25); Penllergaer, Glamorgan, Wales
- Batting: Right-handed
- Bowling: Right-arm fast-medium

Domestic team information
- Years: Team
- 1890–1891: Oxford University
- 1893: Marylebone Cricket Club

Career statistics
Competition	First-class
Matches	20
Runs scored	834
Batting average	22.54
100s/50s	1/1
Top score	116
Balls bowled	35
Wickets	0
Bowling average	–
5 wickets in innings	–
10 wickets in match	–
Best bowling	–
Catches/stumpings	15/–
- Source: Cricinfo, 12 August 2019

William Dillwyn Llewelyn (1 April 1868 – 24 August 1893) was a Welsh first-class cricketer.

Llewelyn was engaged to a daughter of Lord Dynevor, but he committed suicide a week prior to the scheduled date for his marriage. His funeral was attended by many of Wales' leading social figures.

== Family and early life ==
The son of Sir John Dillwyn-Llewellyn and his wife, Caroline Julia Hicks-Beach, he was born at Aberdulais in April 1868. He was educated at Eton College, before going up to New College, Oxford.

== Career ==
While studying at Oxford, he made his debut in first-class cricket for Oxford University against the touring Australians at Oxford in 1890. He played first-class cricket for Oxford until 1891, making sixteen appearances and gaining a blue in both 1890 and 1891. Llewelyn scored 638 runs in these matches, at an average of 20.58 and a high score of 116, which came against the Gentlemen of England in 1890. During his time at Oxford, he also played one first-class match for the Oxford and Cambridge Universities Past and Present cricket team against the Australians at Portsmouth in 1890.

Following his graduation from Oxford, he appeared in further first-class matches in 1893 for the Gentlemen of England and the Marylebone Cricket Club. Llewelyn was associated with Glamorgan County Cricket Club, then a second-class county, becoming the club treasurer in 1893.

== Suicide ==
He killed himself by shooting himself in the grounds of Penllergare House on 24 August 1893, just a week before his marriage to the daughter of Lord Dynevor. His body was discovered in woodland the following morning, with his funeral later attended by many of Wales' leading social figures.
