= Llysdinam =

Hamlet in Powys, Wales

Coordinates: 52.216°N 3.452°W

Llysdinam is a hamlet located in Powys, Wales, to the west and near to the town of Llandrindod Wells. Until 1986 Llysdinam was a community.

== History ==
The Llysdinam estate and hamlet were created by the Venables family around their Llysdinam House, in Newbridge-on-Wye, then in Breconshire. The estate passed through the family, including: Richard Venables (1774–1858), archdeacon of Carmarthen and vicar of Clyro from 1811 to 1846; and Richard Lister Venables (1809–1894), vicar of Clyro and Bettws Clyro. Following the marriage of Katherine Minna (born 1870) and Sir Charles Dillwyn-Venables-Llewellyn, 2nd Baronet, in 1893, the estate was added to the Penllergare and Ynis-y-gerwn estates in Glamorgan, already held by the Dillwyn-Llewelyn family.

From 1911, Sir Charles erected a series of bird nest boxes on the estate, which today number around 1,000. In the 1960s, Sir Michael Dillwyn-Venables-Llewelyn, the Lord Lieutenant of Radnorshire, formed both the educational Llysdinam Trust and the local county wildlife trust to preserve the estate.

== Present ==
After the establishment of the trust, Cardiff University were approached to start a field centre within the estate's grounds but as of 2010 is pending closure

In November 2010, the field centre recorded a low temperature of −18.0 °C (−0.4 °F), Wales's coldest November night on record.
