= Robert Burnie =

British politician

- Burnie in 1895
- Born: Robert John Dickson Burnie; 8 April 1842
- Died: 6 March 1908 (aged 65)
- Predecessor: Lewis Llewelyn Dillwyn
- Successor: Sir John Dillwyn-Llewellyn, Bt
- Political party: Liberal

Robert John Dickson Burnie (8 April 1842 – 6 March 1908) was a Liberal politician who served as MP for the Swansea Town constituency from 1892 to 1895. He was regarded as being on the radical wing of the party and was popular with working-class electors. Defeated by Sir John Llewelyn in 1895 he was rejected as a candidate for the constituency in 1900 due to his opposition to the South African War.

== Early life ==
Burnie was born in 1842 at Dawlish in South Devon where his father, John Dickson Burnie, was a builder and contractor. The family came originally from Dumfriesshire. As a young man, Burnie worked in the railway trade and came to Swansea in 1870 when Shacklefgord, Ford & Co., the works at Cheltenham, where he was general manager, were re-located. He became general manager of the firm in 1876.

== Public life ==
Burnie was elected to the Sweansea Town Council in 1877 and became active in the municipal life of the town, serving as Mayor and Chairman of the Harbour Trust. In 1889, however, the year Swansea became a County Borough, he chose to stand down.

== Political career ==
By the 1890s, Burnie was building a political reputation beyond his adopted town. In 1890 he was nominated to be Liberal candidate for the vacancy in East Carmarthenshire following the death of David Pugh but he withdrew before the selection conference. He became treasurer of the Welsh Farmer's Defence Fund, which was formed in light of tithe agitation, and in early 1892 he made a tour through the counties of South Wales where protests had taken place. He came close to winning the Liberal nomination at Chelsea and also at Mid Glamorgan where he was narrowly defeated in 1890 by Samuel Thomas Evans largely. it was stated, due to Evans being a Welsh-speaking Welshman.

=== Member of Parliament for Swansea ===
The death of the sitting member of Swansea Town, Lewis Llewelyn Dillwyn, shortly before the 1892 General Election led to Burnie being selected as candidate.

Burnie launched his campaign at a public meeting at the Albert Hall, Swansea, where Sir Hussey Vivian presided and endorsed Burnie's campaign in a speech resonating with references to his own father's time as MP for Swansea. Vivian's intervention may have been calculated to counter the impact of the Conservatives' decision to adopt Sir John Llewelyn, a very popular figure locally and nephew of the late member, Lewis Llewelyn Dillwyn.

Having been defeated in 1895, Burnie was again adopted as candidate in 1900. However, he withdrew over his opposition to the South African War.

Parliament of the United Kingdom
Preceded by Lewis Llewelyn Dillwyn	Member of Parliament for Swansea Town; 1892 – 1895	Succeeded by Sir John Dillwyn-Llewellyn, Bt
