= Charles Dillwyn-Venables-Llewelyn =

Welsh Conservative Member of Parliament (1870–1951)

Sir Charles Leyshon Dillwyn-Venables-Llewelyn, 2nd Baronet (29 June 1870 – 24 June 1951) was a Welsh Conservative member of parliament (MP) who briefly represented Radnorshire in the House of Commons and served as Lord-Lieutenant of Radnorshire.

== Personal life ==
Llewelyn was born in 1870 to Sir John Dillwyn-Llewelyn, 1st Baronet and his wife who was the daughter of Sir Michael Hicks Beach, 8th Baronet. His father was High Sheriff of Glamorgan, Mayor of Swansea and MP for Swansea.

He married in 1893 Katherine Minna Venables, daughter of Richard Lister Venables. Following this marriage, the Llysdinam estate came into the family and Sir Charles assumed the additional surname of Venables. He established a wildlife centre on the estate, today run by Cardiff University. Sir Charles' son, Sir Michael set up the Field Centre at Llysdinam in 1970 which was run by Cardiff University until 2010.

His daughter, Agnes Barbara Dillwyn-Venables-Llewelyn, married naval officer Cedric Holland on 15 June 1925.

== Military and political career ==
Llewelyn was on 29 July 1893 appointed a lieutenant in the Royal Carmarthen Artillery, a Militia regiment based in Carmarthen, and was promoted to captain in the regiment on 4 April 1900.

Llewelyn was elected Conservative MP for Radnorshire in January 1910 during the hung parliament of that year, but lost the seat in the election in December. He inherited the baronetcy on the death of his father in 1927. He was Lord-Lieutenant of Radnorshire from 1929 to 1949 and High Sheriff of Radnorshire in 1924.

He died five days before his 81st birthday in June 1951, last survivor of the 22 MPs who only served in the parliament of 1910.

Parliament of the United Kingdom
Preceded by Francis Edwards	Radnorshire; 1910–1910	Succeeded by Sir Francis Edwards, Bt
Honorary titles
Preceded by Charles Coltman-Rogers	Lord-Lieutenant of Radnorshire; 1929–1947	Succeeded by Sir Michael Dillwyn-Venables-Llewelyn, Bt
Baronetage of the United Kingdom
Preceded by John Talbot Dillwyn-Llewelyn	Baronet (of Penllergaer and Ynis-y-gerwn); 1927–1951	Succeeded by Michael Dillwyn-Venables-Llewelyn
