= Dillwyn-Venables-Llewelyn baronets =

Baronetcy in the Baronetage of the United Kingdom

Coat of arms of the Dillwyn-Venables-Llewelyn baronets

The Dillwyn-Llewelyn, later Dillwyn-Venables-Llewelyn baronetcy, of Penllergare in Llangyfelach and of Ynis-y-gerwn in Cadoxton juxta Neath both in the County of Glamorgan, is a title in the Baronetage of the United Kingdom. It was created on 20 March 1890 for John Dillwyn-Llewelyn. The son of pioneer photographer John Dillwyn Llewelyn, he was Mayor of Swansea in 1891 and Member of Parliament for Swansea from 1895 to 1900.

The 2nd Baronet briefly represented Radnorshire in the House of Commons in 1910, and served as Lord-Lieutenant of Radnorshire from 1929. He assumed the additional surname of Venables in 1893. The 3rd Baronet was also Lord-Lieutenant of Radnorshire, from 1949.

== Dillwyn-Llewelyn, later Dillwyn-Venables-Llewelyn baronets, of Penllergare and Ynis-y-gerwn (1890) ==
- Sir John Talbot Dillwyn-Llewelyn, 1st Baronet (1836–1927)
- Sir Charles Leyshon Dillwyn-Venables-Llewelyn, 2nd Baronet (1870–1951)
- Sir (Charles) Michael Dillwyn-Venables-Llewelyn, 3rd Baronet (1900–1976)
- Sir John Michael Dillwyn-Venables-Llewelyn, 4th Baronet (born 1938)

There is no heir to the baronetcy.

== Extended family ==
Lewis Llewelyn Dillwyn, uncle of the 1st Baronet, represented Swansea in Parliament from 1855 until his death in 1892.

== Notes ==
Baronetage of the United Kingdom
Preceded by Whitehead baronets	Dillwyn-Llewelyn baronets of Penllergare and Ynis-y-gerwn; 20 March 1890	Succeeded by Mackenzie baronets

}
