= Winter of 2010–11 in Europe =

The winter of 2010–2011 in Europe began with an unusually cold November caused by a cold weather cycle that started in southern Scandinavia and subsequently moved south and west over both Belgium and the Netherlands on 25 November and into the west of Scotland and north east England on 26 November. This was due to a low pressure zone in the Baltics, with a high pressure over Greenland on 24 November, and ended on 3 May 2011 in Poland.

From 22 November 2010, cold conditions arrived in the United Kingdom, as a cold northerly wind developed and snow began to fall in northern and eastern parts, causing disruption. The winter arrived particularly early for the European climate, with temperatures dropping significantly lower than previous lows for the month of November. On 28 November, Wales recorded its lowest-ever November temperature of −17.3 °C (0.9 °F) in Llysdinam, and Northern Ireland recorded its lowest ever November temperature of −9.5 °C (14.9 °F) in Lough Rea. The UK Met Office issued severe-weather warnings for heavy snow for eastern Scotland and the north-east of England.

From January, temperatures were more normal.

== Meteorological history ==
The weather phenomenon was caused by a cold weather cycle that had started in southern Scandinavia and subsequently moved south and west over both Belgium and the Netherlands on 25 November and into the west of Scotland and northeast England on 26 November. This was due to a low-pressure zone in the Baltics a high pressure over Greenland on 24 November.

A cold front moved out of Siberia on 24 November, and cold spell and snow storms also hit the Alps, on 26 November before hitting the UK on 29 November. Other earlier, but unrelated, storms had dusted Northumberland and the Scottish Borders on 23–24 November, before being absorbed into the advancing Scandinavian weather system. Ireland was first hit on 26 November.

Heavy snow caused many problems across the UK and the first disruption of snowfall occurred on 24 November in the Grampians, Eastern Scotland and Cairngorms, where snow showers blown from a northerly wind caused havoc as accumulations up to 20 centimetres (8 in) in Aviemore made conditions difficult and major roads in Aberdeen had gridlock problems in the rush hour. Further snow disrupted all of Scotland, Southern Wales, Northern Ireland, South West and England and much of the North and East of England as snow accumulated to over 60 centimetres (24 in) in rural settlements in Scotland. The snowfall was the earliest widespread snowfall since 1993. Some forecasters have warned of temperatures dropping to −20 °C (−4 °F). Temperatures in Carterhouse, Scottish Borders, fell to −7.8 °C (18 °F), and several inches of snow were recorded in Devon and Cornwall.

== Timeline ==
=== November to December 2010 ===
On 22 November, forecasters in the Baltic nations saw snow storms expected some in parts of Sweden on the next day, especially in the south of the country. Snow flurries were reported by the afternoon. The Scandinavian low moved southward bringing snow and frost to both The Netherlands and the north west coast of Germany.

==== UK ====
The earliest winter snowfall in the United Kingdom for 17 years was recorded in November 2010. A low night temperature of −9.1 °C (15.6 °F) and heavy snow fell over the night of the 25th/26th, which was recorded at Redesdale Camp, Northumberland. A similar quantity of snow fell in Aberdeenshire, 12 cm (4.7 in) and 10 cm (3.9 in) in Durham that night. A Thomsonfly Boeing 737-800 plane with 196 passengers overshot its landing position at Newcastle Airport due to an icy runway. On 26 November, night-time temperatures plummeted well below 0 °C (32 °F), with the Welsh towns of Sennybridge and Trawscoed being among the coldest places at −10.2 °C (13.6 °F). The town of Dalwhinnie in the Scottish Highlands saw the temperatures fall to −8.2 °C (17.2 °F) and Chesham in Buckinghamshire fell to −7 °C (19 °F), and Preston, Lancashire recorded −5.8 °C (21.6 °F). Inverness recorded a nighttime low of −13 °C (9 °F) with a daytime high of 0 °C (32 °F). The Met Office then issued severe weather warnings for almost every part of the UK The Welsh village of Hawarden recorded its coldest November temperature since 1944 with a reading of −9 °C (16 °F).

The thermometers at Llysdinam, near Llandrindod Wells, Powys, recorded a low of −17.3 °C (0.9 °F), the coldest temperature for the month of November in the UK since 1985, and the coldest November night in Wales on record. Shawbury, in Shropshire was hit with −12.5 °C (9.5 °F); Lough Fea, in Northern Ireland was left hopping with −9.2 °C (15.4 °F); and Church Fenton in North Yorkshire chilled out with a nocturnal low of −11.9 °C (10.6 °F).

The severe winter weather resulted in school closures as Northern Scotland, North East England and parts of North and East Yorkshire were blanketed in up to 6 in (20 cm) of snow. Sub-zero overnight temperatures were recorded across the country, with the coldest place being at Carterhouse in the Scottish Borders at −7.8 °C (18.0 °F) while Benson in Oxfordshire fell to −7.6 °C (18.3 °F). By the middle of 27 November, up to 1.5 in (3.8 cm) of snow fell in parts of Staffordshire overnight while residents in the Black Country also woke up to a covering today with warnings of way with blizzards expected in the region with a predicted snowfall of 8 in (20 cm) over the next few days. Scotland saw the temperature at Loch Glascarnoch fall to −15 °C (5 °F), a new record low for November in Scotland.

Northern Ireland hit a new low of −9.5 °C (14.9 °F) at Lough Fea, Co Tyrone, and Scotland set a November record at Loch Glascarnoch, with −15 °C (5 °F) as snow fell in Scotland, Northern Ireland and North East England. Topcliffe in North Yorkshire saw a temperature of −19 °C (−2 °F) on 2 December, making it the coldest night recorded in Yorkshire.

The city of Edinburgh had 18 cm (7 in) of snowfall. As a result of the chaos the city's airport was closed. It was also reported that around 3,000 homes in the Tayside and Perth areas were without power.

AA said that 29 November 2010 was one of its busiest times in its entire 105-year history as they were called to more than 200,000 broken down drivers across the UK.

The morning of 30 November saw about 30 centimetres (1 ft) of snow hit Banburyshire and Oxfordshire with 2 to 5 cm (0.8 to 2.0 in) snow falling many more parts of the UK, but much less fall in Scotland and Northern Ireland. Over 1,000 schools were closed across the Kingdom, mostly in Scotland and the north of England, with 50 schools in Northumberland, County Durham, and Tyne and Wear closed.

The evening of 30 November and the whole of 1 December saw extremely heavy snowfall hit Sheffield, one of the worst affected cities in England. All transport was cancelled throughout the city and the surrounding areas and many people were snowed in their homes. On that day, 40–50 cm (16–20 in) of snow fell on top of a blanket of 25–30 cm (9.8–11.8 in) of snow.

The evening of 1 December and the morning of 2 December there was extremely heavy snow in Southern England, especially on the South Coast, 30–40 cm (12–16 inches) of snow was recorded throughout East and West Sussex with the South Downs receiving close to 60 cm (24 in) of snow.

More heavy snowfall was reported in Southern England on 17/18 December, with parts of Greater London reporting nearly 20 cm (7.9 in). Snow even settled in Central London, causing travel disruptions to the city's Underground system and airports.

This was the coldest December recorded in the UK since 1890.

The lowest temperature of the winter so far is −21.2 °C (−6.2 °F) recorded at Altnaharra in the Scottish Highlands at 10 am on 2 December.

==== Ireland ====
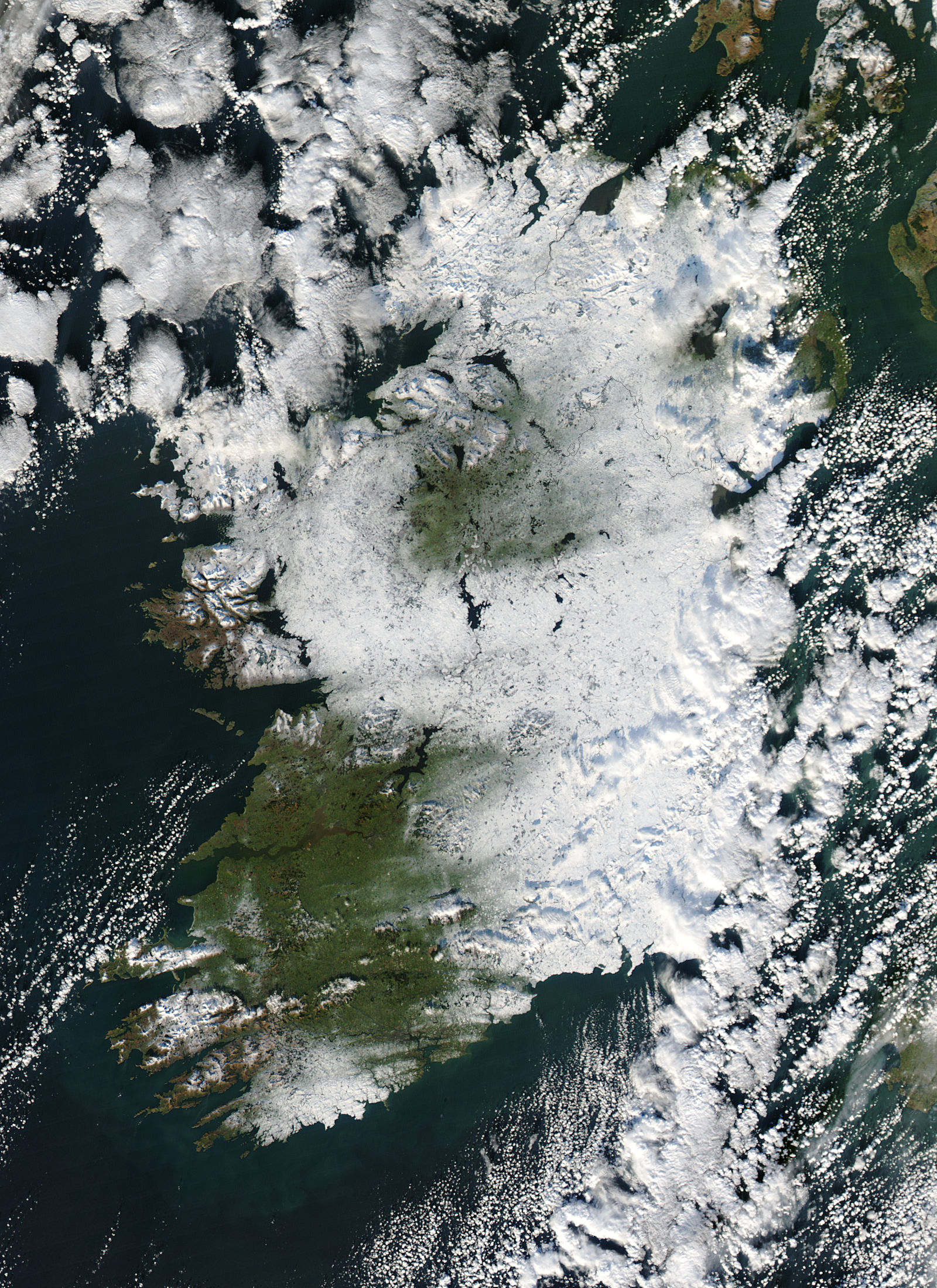
Photograph of snow in Ireland taken by the NASA Aqua satellite on 2 December 2010

Ireland was first hit by the snow on the morning of 27 November 2010. The morning of Saturday, 27 November, saw Ireland freezing in what could be a rather costly cold snap as it emerged that the extreme weather earlier in 2010 had cost a colossal €297m in insurance payouts, due to the snow causing damage was also caused to homes and other buildings all over the country. The Irish Insurance Federation revealed there were 22,450 claims from the public, the vast majority of which involved snow or ice damage to people's homes. Road conditions in the Dublin area were made dangerous after freezing temperatures and snow led to icy surfaces and paths were made Icy by frost. A prolonged freeze disrupted businesses and schools as travel was made hazardous. The DART and the northern commuter and Maynooth commuter lines were not running and Belfast and Rosslare train services out of Dublin were also affected. The main runway at Dublin Airport closed due to snow and ice for most of the day.

The extreme weather was reminiscent of the winter storms of 2009/2010, which were the worst in recent Irish history. Met Éireann said the areas worst affected by the overnight snow were eastern parts of Leinster, County Donegal and Connacht and said the bad weather was expected to last for up to a week, with depths of up to 10 centimetres (3.9 in) in places. Met Éireann put a weather warning in place and more snow for the counties in the east, north and north west. They also put a gale and small craft warning in effect.

==== Switzerland ====
Heavy snowfall was reported across higher parts of the country on 26 November and in lowland Switzerland on the next day. Heavy snow caused Geneva Airport to close. The temperatures hovered between +5 and −5 °C (41 and 23 °F) for the next 8 days, with 30 November to 1 December having a nighttime temperature of −11 °C (12 °F). Similar weather was predicted for the Austrian Tyrol.

==== France ====
A record −15.3 °C (4.5 °F) was measured 30 November in Orléans, France. This is the lowest temperature in November at sea level in France. Ice and snow led to power outages in Orléans.

==== Scandinavia ====
Trondheim, Norway's third-biggest city, located in Central Norway, experienced the coldest November since the beginning of recording temperatures in 1788. Especially the last week of November saw temperatures 12–14 degrees Celsius change (22–25 °F) below normal.

Severe blizzards hit southern Sweden and Denmark, affecting flights at Copenhagen Airport. Over 30 centimetres (12 in) of snow fell. Helsinki and Stockholm recorded their coldest November nights on record, at −20 and −17 °C , respectively (−4 and 1 °F).

According to thelocal.se Sweden had its coldest and snowiest start to the winter in 100 years. The east coast of Sweden experienced heavy snowfall in November/December, coming from very cold air influenced by the still open water of the Baltic Sea and the Gulf of Bothnia.

On 22 December 2010, there were 56 centimeters of snow in Helsinki, Finland. Throughout the winter, the snow had caused a one-minute increase in the average response time of the city's fire and rescue department. In Sweden there was severe snowfall near Christmas, especially in Scania on 23 December, on Öland on 24 December, and in South Norrland coast on 26 December. These were very important Christmas travel days, and caused heavy travel disturbances, especially for trains. Worst hit was Bornholm, Denmark on 23 December, which got all roads unpassable for days, which meant that arriving visitors had to celebrate Christmas in schools or hotels, Bornholm got to 130 cm snow in December 2010, the deepest snow cover on record in Denmark's weather history.

In January, the temperatures in Sweden were warmer than normal, Malmö had 0 °C, Stockholm −3 °C and Luleå -11 °C on average. South Sweden had 0–1 °C above normal, but south Norrland had 2–4 °C above normal. The snow cover mostly remained in all the country during this month.

In February, the temperatures in Sweden were again colder than normal, Malmö had −1 °C, Stockholm −5 °C and Luleå -16 °C on average. South Sweden had 0–2 °C below normal, but north Norrland had 3–5 °C below normal. There was a storm on 8 February over Skåne and neighbourhood with a sustained wind of up to 30 m/s. The temperature reached −42.6 °C in Nikkaluokta, the coldest in Sweden this winter.

==== Estonia ====
November started with very high temperatures across Estonia, temperatures rose up to 13 °C, but a week later a cold front crossed Estonia bringing storms with up to 20 cm of snowfall, but it melted very fast. End of November temperatures went down to -27 °C. On 9 and 10 December snowstorm Monika brought severe snowfall and blizzards to Estonia. Little town of Väike-Maarja received in 24 hours up to 40 cm of snow. Six hundred cars with people were trapped on the road in Padaorg, Viru-Nigula. Many of Tallinn airport's flights were cancelled because of heavy snowfall. Schools were closed. Another snowstorm Scarlett brought a very heavy snowfall on 24 December, again many people were trapped and the roads were closed. Between those 2 storms, lake effect brought more snow, so by the end of the December many places in Estonia had up to 50 to 80 cm of snow. The year-lowest temperature was in Jõgeva -33.4 °C, on 18 February.

==== Germany ====
Germany experienced its coldest December since 1969. The average temperature was −3.7 °C which was 4.5 °C below the long-term mean. This made December 2010 the fourth-coldest of the last 120 years. Only 1890, 1969 and 1933 were colder. The cold was strongest in the northern half of Germany with deviations from the long-term mean between −5 °C and −6 °C. The month was slightly milder in the south, due to two notable periods of thawing and maximum temperatures of up to +15 °C around 8 December and shortly before Christmas.

Additionally to the cold, about 60% of the German Weather Service's weather stations below 200 metres' elevation saw record snow falls for December. Notably, Aachen, in Germany's west, had 36 cm of snow, breaking the old record of 25 cm. The heavy snowfalls between 22 and 25 December provided for a white Christmas for all of Germany – the first time since 1981. On 26 December, Gera had a snow cover of 70 cm, also a new record. However, these snowfalls and freezing rain caused chaotic conditions for those travelling home for Christmas. Similar conditions had already occurred at the beginning of the month. At Germany's busiest airport in Frankfurt, many flights were cancelled for the second day running on 2 December due to the severe weather conditions. Munich Airport and rail transport were also affected.

==== Poland ====
Eighteen people died from exposure in Poland in the first two days of December 2010, when temperatures dropped as low as −26 °C (−15 °F).

==== Belgium ====
On 18 December, Belgium had recorded 17 days with snow for the season, an absolute record. A church in Diepenbeek collapsed on 24 December under the weight of the snow.

== Record-low temperatures ==
=== Sweden ===
Many cities in Sweden had their coldest December since the beginning of recording temperatures. The average temperature in Gothenburg was −6.2 °C. which was 2.5 °C colder than the old record. In Örebro the coldest temperature in December since 1886 with −26.6 °C was measured. The coldest temperature that was notified in December in Sweden was −42.1 °C in Nikkaluokta.

=== Norway ===
Trondheim, Norway's third-biggest city, experienced the coldest November since the beginning of recording temperatures in 1788. Especially the last week of November saw temperatures 12–14 degrees Celsius change (22–25 °F) below normal. The average temperature in Oslo was −1.7 °C (28.9 °F) in November 2010, the coldest since 1968 which had −2.1 °C (28.2 °F). The record low for Norway in November 2010 was measured in Karasjok Municipality in Finnmark, the northernmost county, on 27 November, showing −35 °C (−31 °F).

=== Northern Ireland ===
Castlederg, in western Northern Ireland, recorded a new record-low temperature of −18 °C (−0.4 °F) on 18 December 2010. The previous Northern Ireland record was −17.5 °C (0.5 °F).

The same location then beat this record on the morning of 23 December, reaching −18.7 °C (−1.66 °F).

=== Denmark ===
On 22 December a minimum temperature of -23 °C was measured at Holbæk. This was a cold record for the month of December.

== Floodings and high temperatures in Balkans ==
Much different temperatures occurred in the beginning of December in the Balkans, where heavy rain caused floodings in Bosnia and Herzegovina, Croatia, Montenegro, and Serbia. The River Neretva reached its highest level in the past 50 years. The rivers Lim and Drina both caused severe flooding. The River Drina reached a high point of around eleven times its normal level, and the Lim flooded around 250 acres of land, as well as around 50 buildings. A state of emergency was declared in parts of Albania because of floodings near the cities of Shkodra and Durrës. In Bulgaria, temperatures in the end of November and beginning of December went to 20 °C (68 °F).

In response to the flooding, upwards of 12,000 people were evacuated in Albania from the areas most affected. An estimated 2,600 houses were flooded, while some 7,500 more damaged. Around 1,400 Albanian military and police personnel were deployed to assist in the evacuations. In addition to domestic resources, NATO dispatched five helicopters from Greece and Turkey, while Italy delivered 25 tonnes of supplies to the country. According to Albanian interior minister Lulzim Basha, the flooding was the worst "in living memory." In Montenegro, upwards of a thousand soldiers were deployed in response to the flooding.

== See also ==
- 2010 Central European floods
- 2010 Var floods
- 2010 Northern Hemisphere summer heat wave
- Winter of 2010–2011 in Great Britain and Ireland
- Arctic dipole anomaly
- Arctic oscillation
