= Sir John Dillwyn-Llewelyn, 1st Baronet =

British Conservative Member of Parliament (1836 –1927)

John Dillwyn-Llewelyn
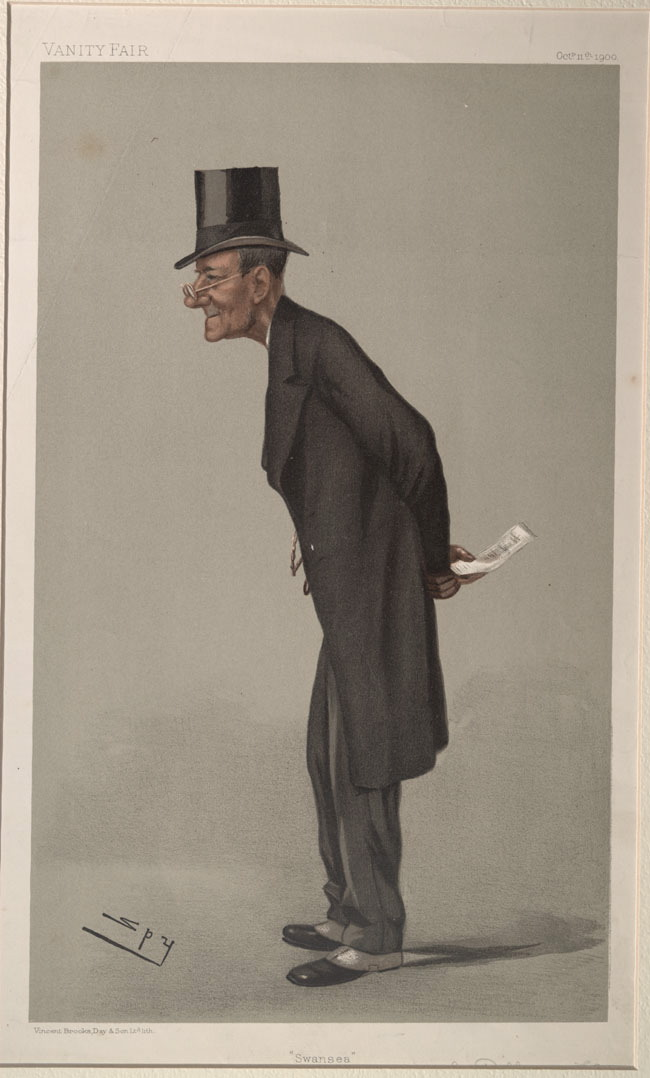
- Caricature by Spy in Vanity Fair, October 1900

President of the Welsh Rugby Union
- In office 1885–1906

Member of Parliament for Swansea Town
- In office 1895–1900

Glamorgan County Council Member
- In office 1889–?

High Sheriff of Glamorgan
- In office 1878–1879

Personal details
- Born: 26 May 1836
- Died: 6 July 1927 (aged 91)
- Political party: Conservative
- Spouse: Caroline Beach (m. 1861)
- Children: 2+, including Willie and Charles
- Parent: John Dillwyn Llewelyn (father)
- Relatives: Thereza Dillwyn Llewelyn (sister); Lewis Llewelyn Dillwyn (uncle)
- Education: Christ Church, Oxford

Sir John Talbot Dillwyn-Llewelyn, 1st Baronet (26 May 1836 – 6 July 1927) was a British Conservative Member of Parliament who was notable for his links to Welsh sports.

== Background and education ==
Llewelyn was the son of photographer and scientist John Dillwyn Llewelyn and Emma Thomasina Talbot, youngest daughter of Thomas Mansel Talbot and Lady Mary (née Fox Strangways) of Penrice, south Wales and a cousin of William Henry Fox Talbot. He was educated at Eton and later Christ Church, Oxford.

== Political career ==
Llewelyn was High Sheriff of Glamorgan in 1878 and Mayor of Swansea in 1891.

In March 1888, Llewelyn contested the Gower by-election as a Conservative candidate. The Liberal ranks had been affected by divisions over the choice of candidate and Llewelyn ran a strong campaign. Unusually for a Conservative candidate he held meetings in nonconformist chapels, including one at Zoar, Ystalyfera which was said to have been well attended by the working men of the district. Llewelyn polled well although narrowly defeated by David Randell.

In 1889 he was elected as one of the first members of Glamorgan County Council and was immediately made an alderman, to which role he was re-elected in 1895. He was created a baronet, 'of Penllergaer in Llangyfelach and of Ynys-y-gerwn in Cadoxton juxta Neath both in the County of Glamorgan', on 20 March 1890.

In 1892, following the death of his uncle, Lewis Llewelyn Dillwyn, Llewelyn was adopted as Conservative candidate for the Swansea Town constituency but was defeated by R.D. Burnie. However he reversed the result three years later when he was elected Conservative MP for Swansea in the 1895 general election, but lost the seat in 1900.

Llewelyn's connections to sport included the position of captain of the South Wales Cricket Club and in 1885 he replaced the Earl of Jersey as the president of the Welsh Rugby Union; a post he would hold until 1906, when he was replaced by Horace Lyne. Lyne himself stated that 'they (WRU) had been singularly fortunate in getting a gentleman like Mr J.T.D. Llewelyn to act in that captaincy'.

== Family ==
Llewelyn married in 1861 Caroline Julia, daughter of Sir Michael Hicks Beach, 8th Baronet. Their younger and only surviving son Charles married the heiress of the Venables family and adopted the additional surname Venables. He became MP for Radnorshire and High Sheriff of that county. His eldest son, the cricketer Willie Llewelyn, committed suicide in August 1893.

== Later life and death ==
Llewelyn died in 1927 aged 91 and was buried with his wife and next to his father in St David's Church in Penllergaer.

== Arms ==
Coat of arms of Sir John Dillwyn-Llewelyn
Crest "Upon the trunk of a tree, fesswise eradicated and sprouting, a lamb passant Proper supporting a staff Or, therefrom flowing a banner Gules charged with three chevronels Argent" (Llewelyn); 2: "In front of a stag's head couped Proper three trefoils slipped Proper" (Dillwyn). Escutcheon "Quarterly 1 & 4: Argent, gutte de poise, three chevronels Gules, in base a lamb passant Proper" (Llewelyn); 2 & 3: "Gules, on a chevron nebuly Argent five trefoils slipped of the First" (Dillwyn); "At the centre point a baronet's badge." Motto Craignez Honte (Dread shame)

== Legacy ==
Dillwyn Llewelyn Community School in Cockett, Swansea, was named for him – this was amalgamated with Dynevor School in 2001 to become Dylan Thomas Community School

== See also ==
- Spy Cartoon in Vanity Fair

== Bibliography ==
- Smith, David; Williams, Gareth (1980). Fields of Praise: The Official History of The Welsh Rugby Union. Cardiff: University of Wales Press. ISBN 0-7083-0766-3.

Parliament of the United Kingdom
Preceded by Robert John Dickson Burnie	Member of Parliament for Swansea Town; 1895 – 1900	Succeeded by Sir George Newnes
Honorary titles
Preceded by	High Sheriff of Glamorgan; 1878–1879	Succeeded by
Baronetage of the United Kingdom
New creation	Baronet (of Penllergaer and Ynis-y-gerwn); 1890–1927	Succeeded by Charles Dillwyn-Venables-Llewelyn
