= Swansea (UK Parliament constituency) =

UK Parliament constituency (1885–1918)

- Former borough constituency for the House of Commons

1885–1918
- Seats: one
- Created from: Swansea District
- Replaced by: Swansea East and Swansea West

Swansea (known officially as Swansea Town, to distinguish it from the Swansea District seat) was a borough constituency. It was represented in the House of Commons of the Parliament of the United Kingdom. It elected one Member of Parliament (MP) by the first-past-the-post system of election.

== Overview ==
In contrast to most of the Glamorgan seats, Swansea Town was not natural Liberal territory although the involvement of its powerful industrialists within the Liberal Association prevented the Conservatives from gaining the seat, apart from the 1895 election. After the turn of the century, labour candidates began to make an impact in municipal elections in Swansea, drawing support from the dockers as well as the miners and tin-platers, but this did not lead to a serious parliamentary challenge to the Liberals until after the First World War.

== Boundaries ==
The constituency was created in 1885 when the previous Swansea District constituency - a combination of the boroughs of Swansea, Neath, Aberavon. Loughor and Kenfig, which had existed since 1832, was split into two. The new Swansea Town constituency consisted of the bulk of the borough of Swansea, while the northern part of the borough, centred on Morriston, together with the four smaller boroughs formed the new Swansea District constituency.

== Members of Parliament ==
Year	Member	Party
1885	Lewis Llewelyn Dillwyn	Liberal
1892	Robert Burnie	Liberal
1895	Sir John Dillwyn-Llewelyn	Conservative
1900	George Newnes	Liberal
1910	Alfred Mond	Liberal
1918	constituency abolished	

== History ==
Swansea was represented by William Foxwist in the Third Protectorate Parliament of 1659. Otherwise it was a contributory borough to Cardiff until 1832 and then until 1885 it was the principal borough of the Swansea district of boroughs.

Swansea Liberal Association was presided over from the outset by industrialists such as Cory Yeo and Morgan Tutton, and their influence contributed to the return of a Liberal candidate at every election down to 1922, save that of 1895. In relation to popular support, the substantial Irish community in Swansea supported the Liberals. However, the most powerful feature in the last years of the nineteenth century was the substantial nonconformist vote, which was strongly influenced by ministers such as Gomer Lewis of Capel Gomer Baptist Church in the centre of the city.

=== Lewis Llewelyn Dillwyn ===
The first member, from 1885, was the veteran radical Lewis Llewelyn Dillwyn. Although Dillwyn was an Anglican, he was considered to have 'advanced' views in relation to the disestablishment of the Anglican Church in Wales and he regularly sought to introduce legislation on this issue in the House of Commons. Dillwyn was opposed in 1885 by the little known 22-year-old Conservative candidate, W.H. Meredyth. Meredyth belonged to a leading Anglo-Irish family and drew much of his support during the campaign from various members of the aristocracy who came to Swansea to support him. At several meetings, he struggled to gain a hearing but polled remarkably well given his youth and inexperience.

In 1892, Dillwyn, now aged 78, had every intention of contesting the General Election. On 1 June a joint meeting of the Swansea Conservative and Liberal Unionist associations resolved to nominate F. Ormesby-Gore as the candidate in the forthcoming election. However, on 18 June, Dillwyn, having attended a meeting at Swansea Liberal Club where David Randell was re-adopted as Liberal candidate for the Gower constituency, Dillwyn was taken ill at a meeting to plan his own campaign and died the following day at the Royal Hotel, Swansea.

=== Robert Burnie ===
Shortly after Dillwyn's death, Ormesby-Gore withdrew and the Conservatives selected his nephew, Sir John Llewelyn as their candidate. Llewelyn was commonly regarded as being the strongest candidate available to the Conservatives but due to the family connection he was unable to contest Swansea Town. The Liberals selected R.D. Burnie, who was well known for his radical views and was, as a result, popular amongst the working class electorate. At his adoption meeting, Burnie declared himself sternly in favour of disestablishment, reflecting the views of his predecessor, but also expressed strong support for Home Rule for Wales as well as Ireland, thus placing himself firmly in the Cymru Fydd camp.

Burnie was another local industrialist whose somewhat advanced views on social questions made him popular with the labour element but somewhat suspect amongst his colleagues. Burnie launched his campaign at a public meeting at the Albert Hall, Swansea, where Sir Hussey Vivian presided and endorsed Burnie's campaign in a speech resonating with references to his own father's time as MP for Swansea. Vivian's intervention may have been calculated to counter the impact of the Conservatives' decision to adopt Sir John Llewelyn, a very popular figure locally and nephew of the late member, Lewis Llewelyn Dillwyn.

=== Sir John Llewelyn ===
Burnie was a casualty of the 1895 election when he was defeated by Sir John Dillwyn-Llewelyn, Bt, a prominent local Conservative and one of the few non-Liberals to be elevated to the aldermanic bench on Glamorgan County Council.

=== George Newnes ===
By 1900 Burnie's opposition to the South African Wr ensured that he was not re-adopted. In his place the Liberals selected Sir George Newnes, a newspaper magnate whose wealth far outweighed his political skills.

=== Alfred Mond ===
Newnes served until 1910 when he was replaced by Alfred Mond. Mond was subjected to anti-semitic attacks by the Conservatives who mocked him as an unsuitable representative for the nonconformist Swansea middle-class. But as a Powerful capitalist who employed much of the Swansea population his position was, for the time being, beyond challenge.

== Election results ==
=== Elections in the 1880s ===
General election 1885: Swansea Town
Party	Candidate	Votes	%	±%
Liberal	Lewis Llewelyn Dillwyn	3,660	59.2	
Conservative	William Herbert Meredyth	2,520	40.8	
Majority		1,140	18.4	
Turnout		6,180	81.3	
Registered electors		7,597		
Liberal win (new seat)				

General election 1886: Swansea Town
Party	Candidate	Votes	%	±%
Liberal	Lewis Llewelyn Dillwyn	3,040	63.6	+4.4
Liberal Unionist	Albert James Lambert	1,740	36.4	−4.4
Majority		1,300	27.2	+8.8
Turnout		4,780	62.9	−18.4
Registered electors		7,597		
Liberal hold		Swing	+4.4	

=== Elections in the 1890s ===
General election 1892: Swansea Town
Party	Candidate	Votes	%	±%
Liberal	Robert Burnie	3,733	55.4	−8.2
Conservative	John Dillwyn-Llewelyn	3,011	44.6	+8.2
Majority		722	10.8	−16.4
Turnout		6,744	79.8	+16.9
Registered electors		8,447		
Liberal hold		Swing	-8.2	

General election 1895: Swansea Town
Party	Candidate	Votes	%	±%
Conservative	John Dillwyn-Llewelyn	3,977	52.8	+8.2
Liberal	Robert Burnie	3,556	47.2	−8.2
Majority		421	5.6	N/A
Turnout		7,533	82.9	+3.1
Registered electors		9,091		
Conservative gain from Liberal		Swing	+8.2	

=== Elections in the 1900s ===
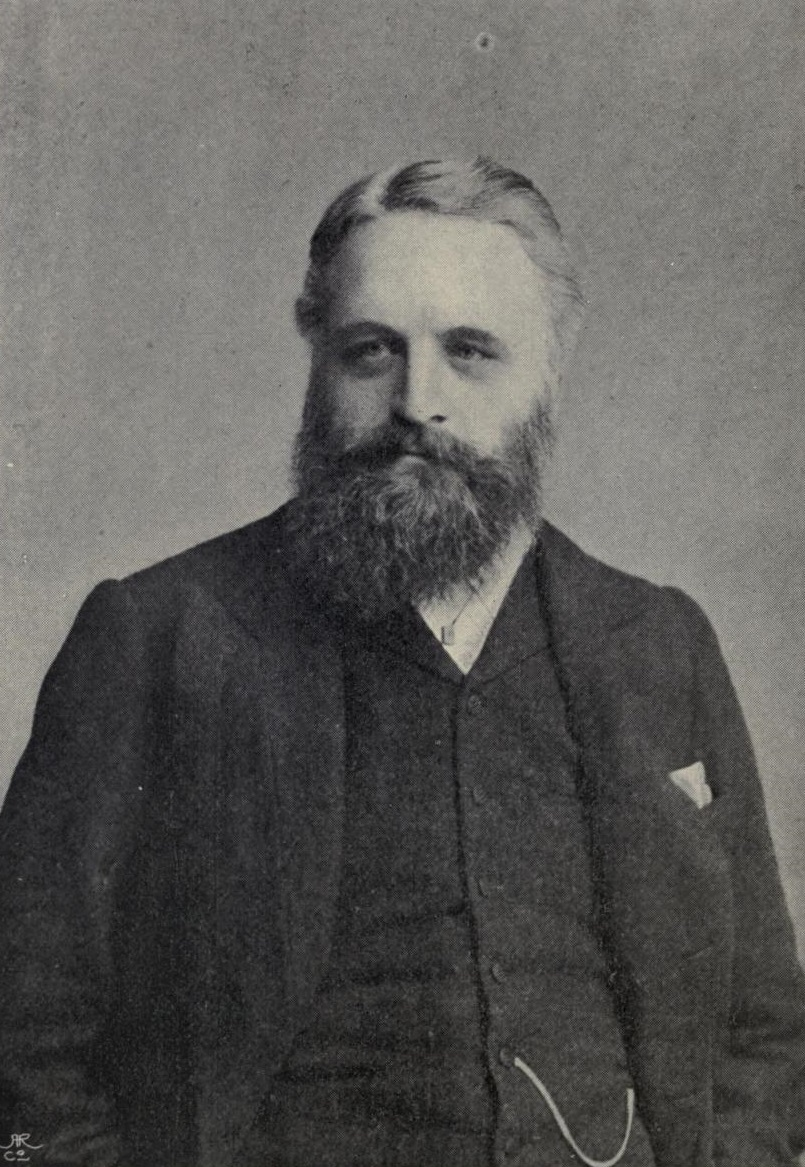
Newnes

General election 1900: Swansea Town
Party	Candidate	Votes	%	±%
Liberal	George Newnes	4,318	57.4	+10.2
Conservative	John Dillwyn-Llewelyn	3,203	42.6	−10.2
Majority		1,115	14.8	N/A
Turnout		7,521	82.8	−0.1
Registered electors		9,079		
Liberal gain from Conservative		Swing	+10.2	

General election January 1906: Swansea Town
Party	Candidate	Votes	%	±%
Liberal	George Newnes	5,535	57.6	+0.2
Conservative	John Wright	4,081	42.4	−0.2
Majority		1,454	15.2	+0.4
Turnout		9,616	87.2	+4.4
Registered electors		11,030		
Liberal hold		Swing	+0.2	

=== Elections in the 1910s ===
Alfred Mond

General election January 1910: Swansea Town
Party	Candidate	Votes	%	±%
Liberal	Alfred Mond	6,020	50.8	−6.8
Conservative	John Wright	4,379	37.0	−5.4
Independent Labour	Ben Tillett	1,451	12.2	New
Majority		1,641	13.8	−1.4
Turnout		11,850	91.6	+4.4
Liberal hold		Swing	-1.4	

General election December 1910: Swansea Town
Party	Candidate	Votes	%	±%
Liberal	Alfred Mond	6,503	60.4	+9.6
Conservative	David Villiers Meager	4,257	39.6	+2.6
Majority		2,246	20.8	+7.0
Turnout		10,760	83.2	−8.4
Liberal hold		Swing	+3.5	

General Election 1914–15:

Another General Election was required to take place before the end of 1915. The political parties had been making preparations for an election to take place and by July 1914, the following candidates had been selected;

- Liberal: Alfred Mond
- Unionist:
- Labour: David Williams

== Sources ==
=== Books and Journals ===
- Morgan, Kenneth O. (1960). "Democratic Politics in Glamorgan, 1884-1914". Morgannwg. 4: 5–27.
- Morgan, Kenneth O (1991). Wales in British Politics 1868–1922 (3rd ed.). Cardiff: University of Wales Press. ISBN 0708311245.
- Rees, Ivor Thomas (Autumn 2004). "Whatever happened to young William?". Gwent Local History. 97: 58–66.
